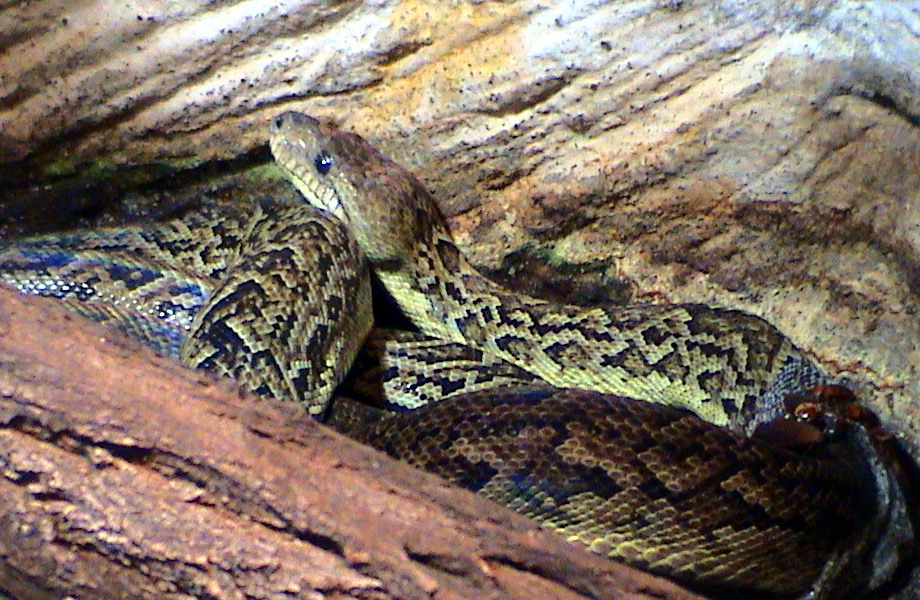
- Cuban boa, C. angulifer

Scientific classification
- Kingdom: Animalia
- Phylum: Chordata
- Class: Reptilia
- Order: Squamata
- Suborder: Serpentes
- Family: Boidae
- Subfamily: Boinae
- Genus: Chilabothrus; Duméril & Bibron, 1844

= Chilabothrus =

Genus of snakes

Chilabothrus, commonly known as the Greater Antillean boas or West Indian boas, is a genus of nonvenomous snakes the family Boidae. The genus is endemic to the West Indies. 12 or 14 species are recognized as being valid.

== Distribution ==
Species of Chilabothrus are found throughout the West Indies, from the Lucayan Archipelago to the Virgin Islands and all four of the Greater Antilles.

== Species ==
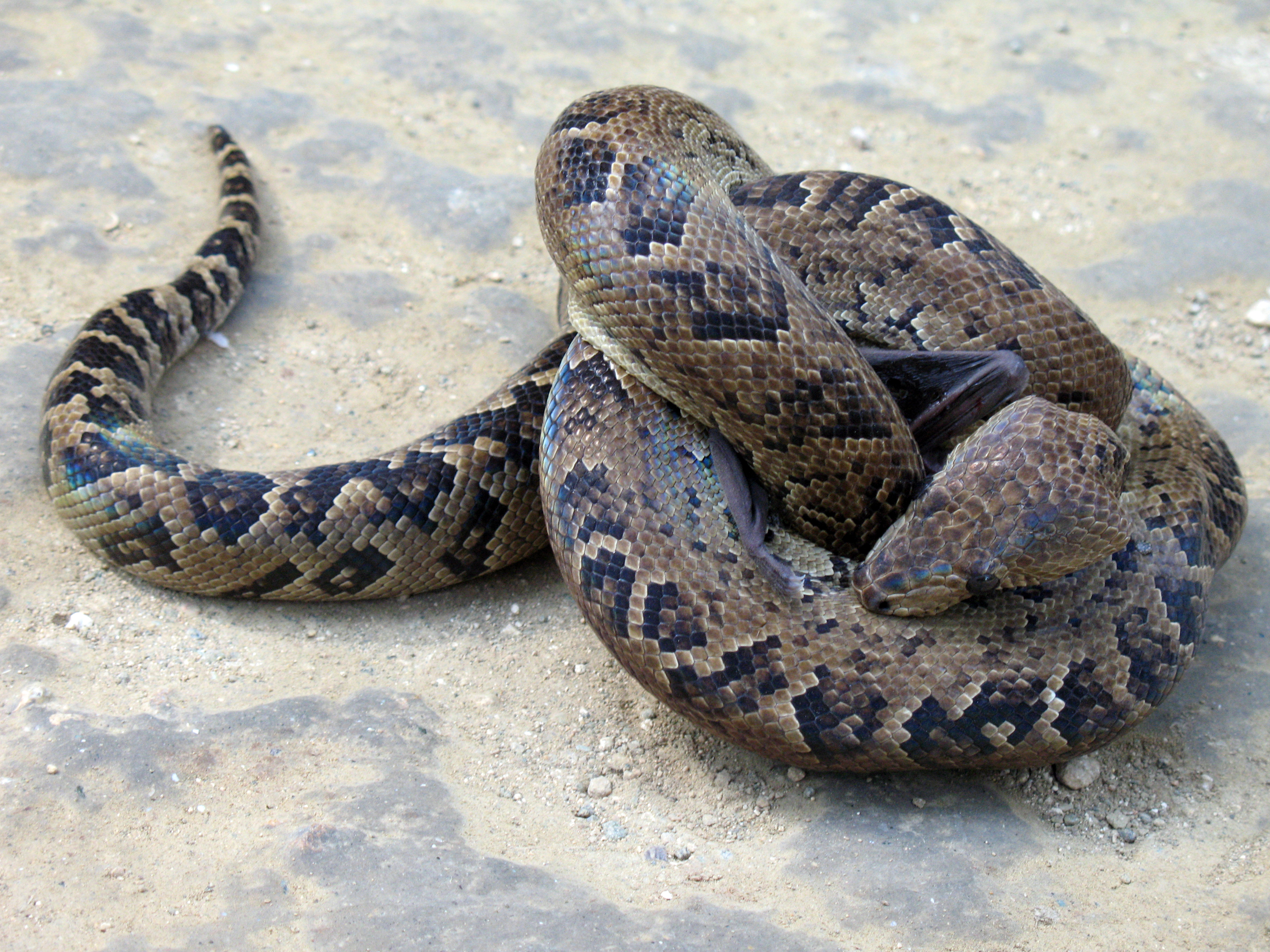
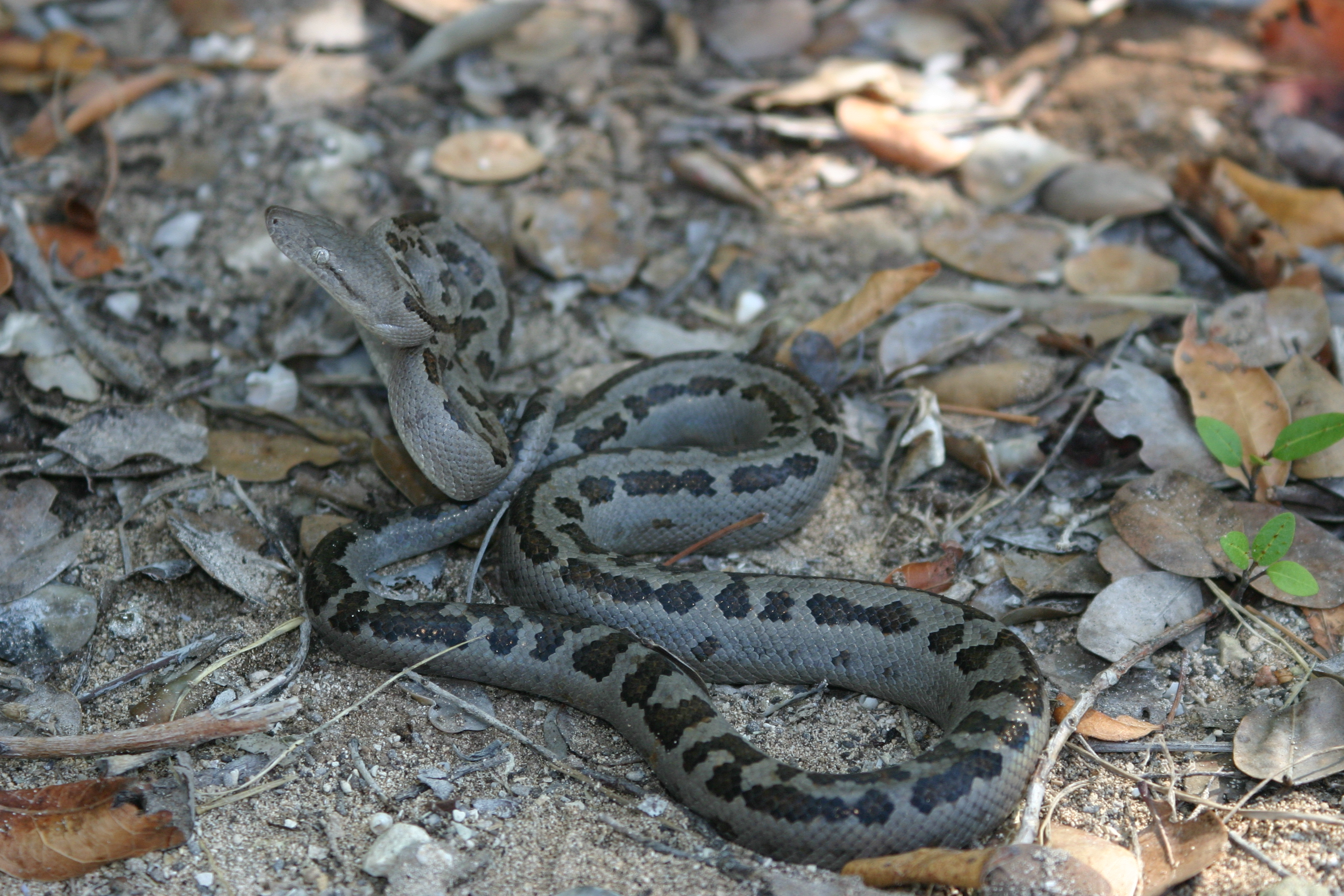
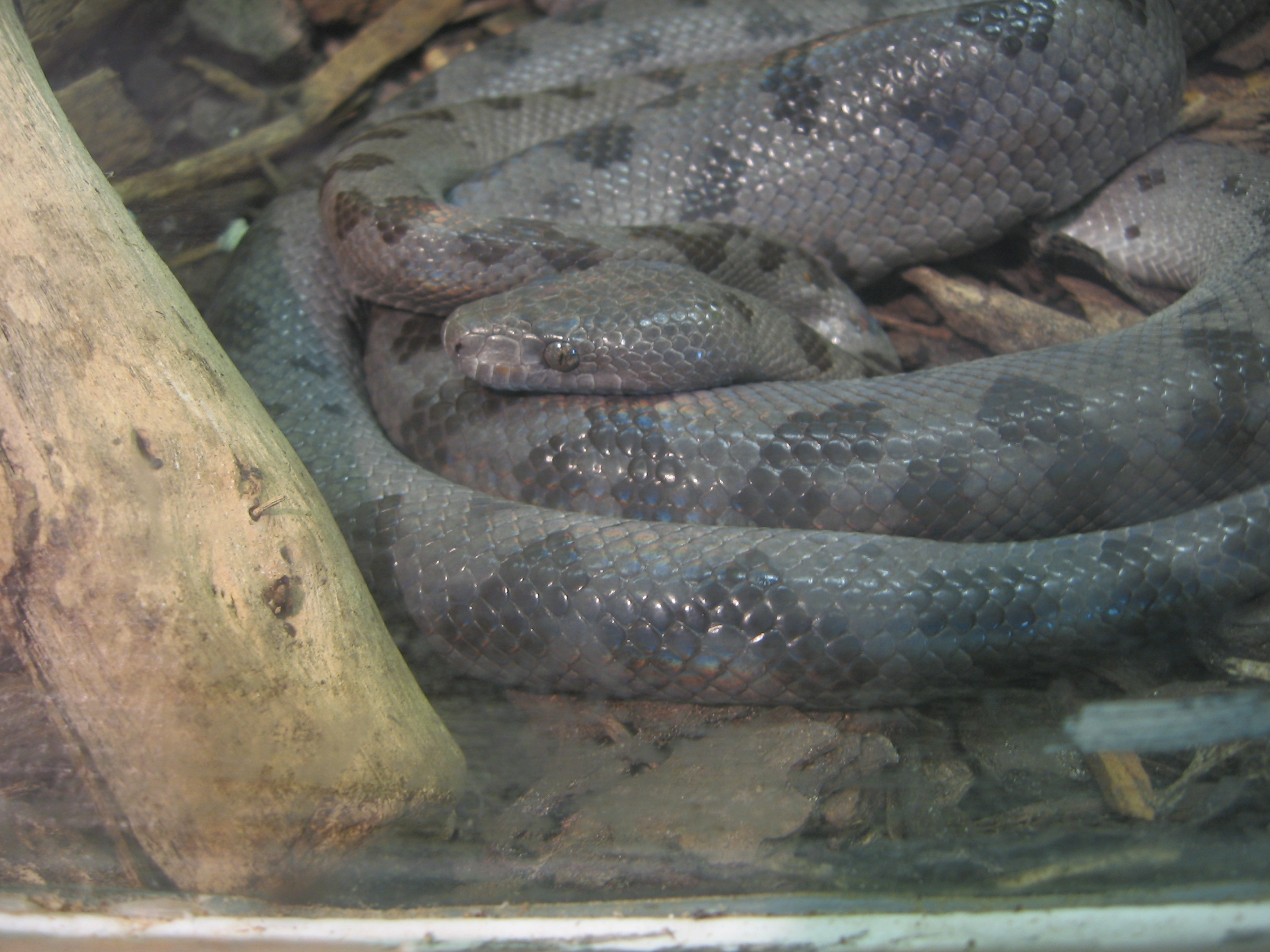
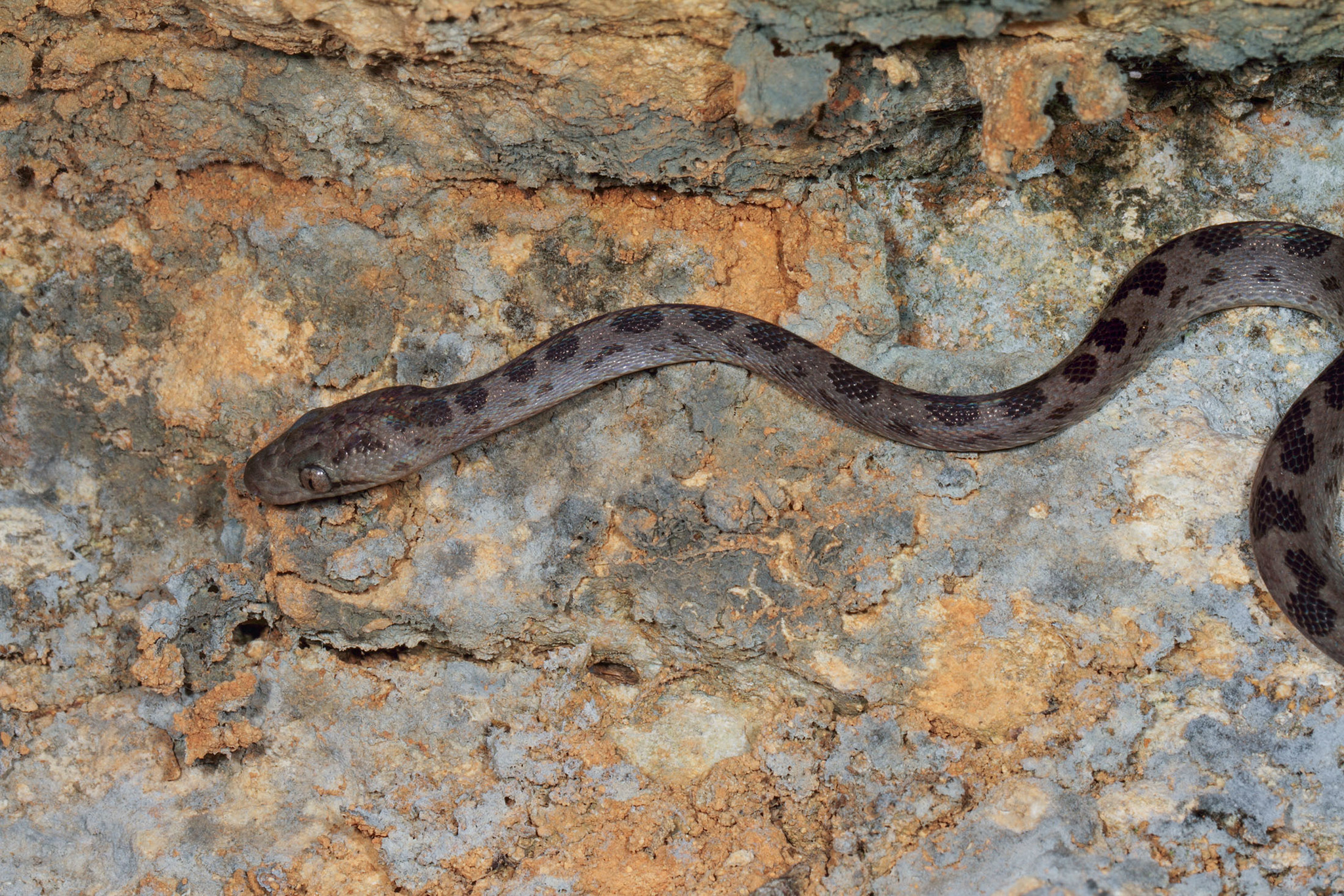
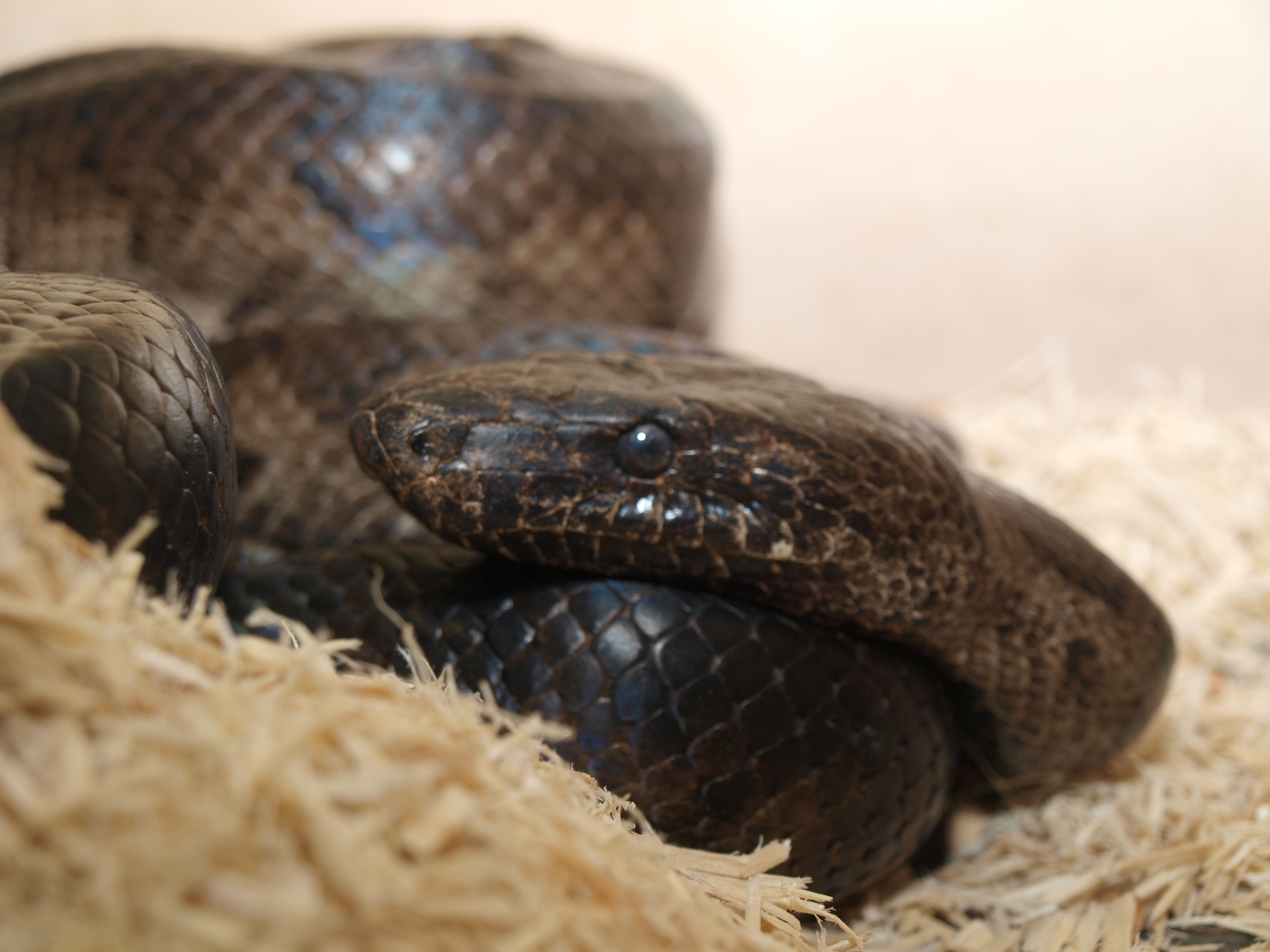
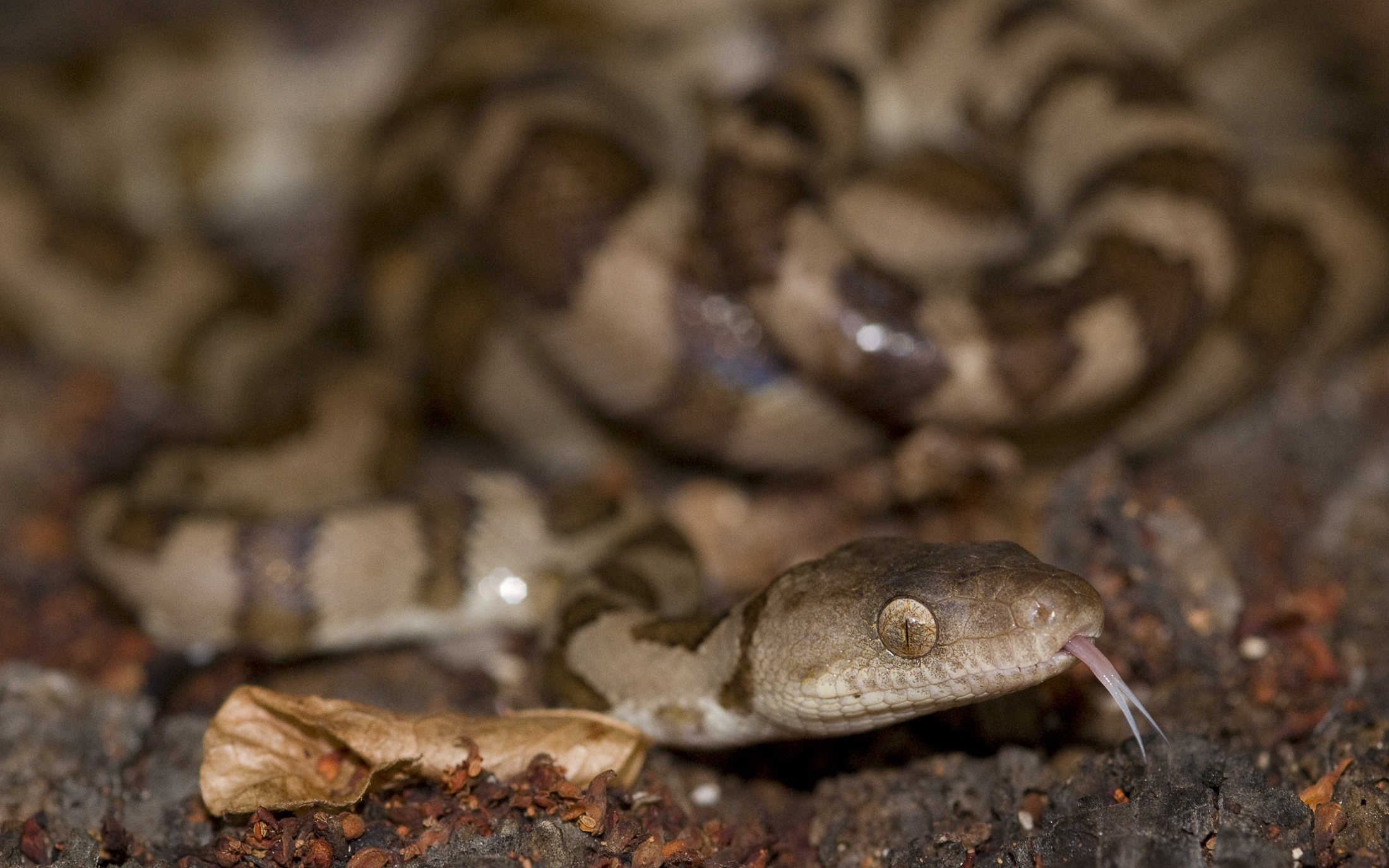
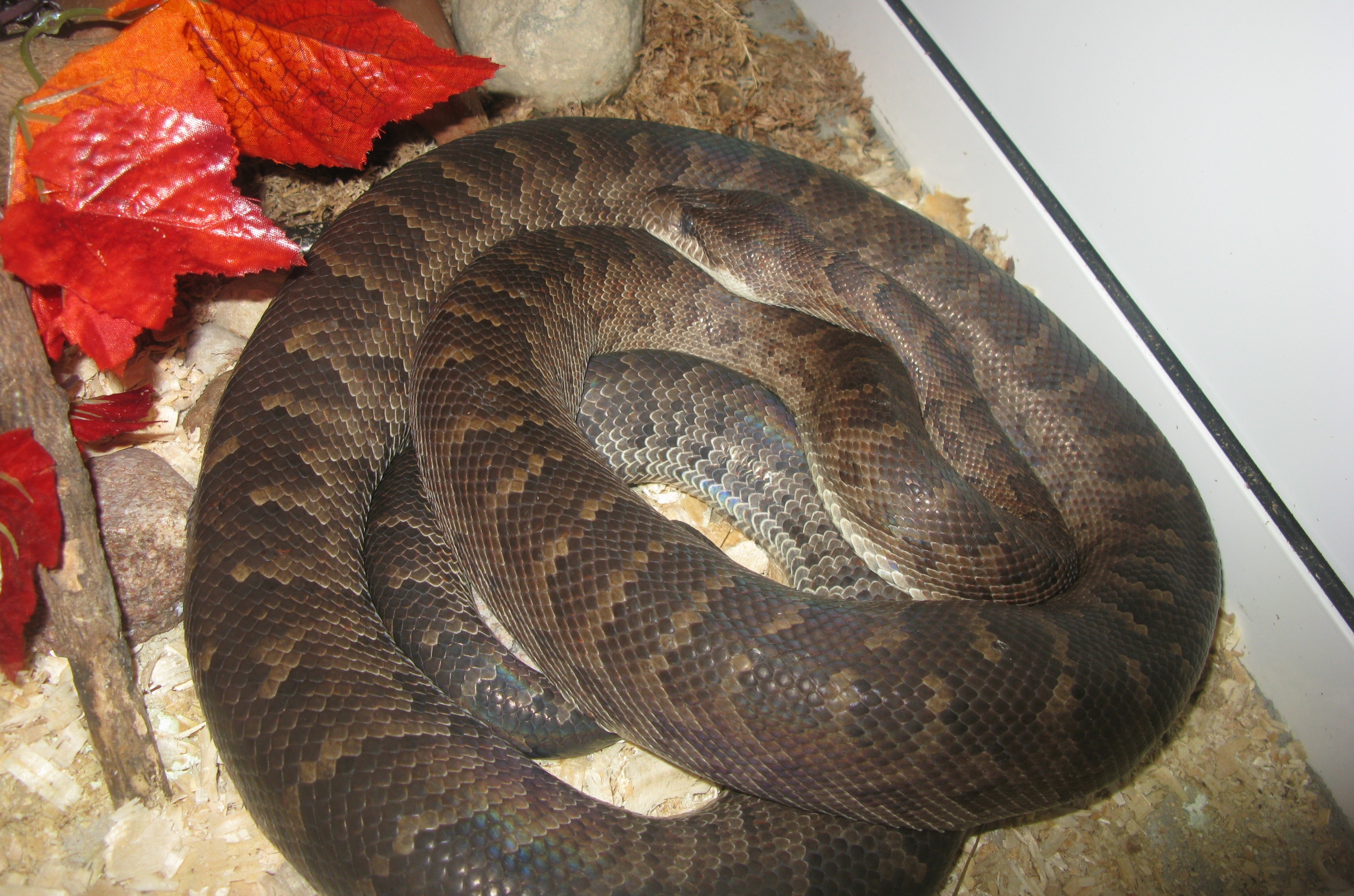
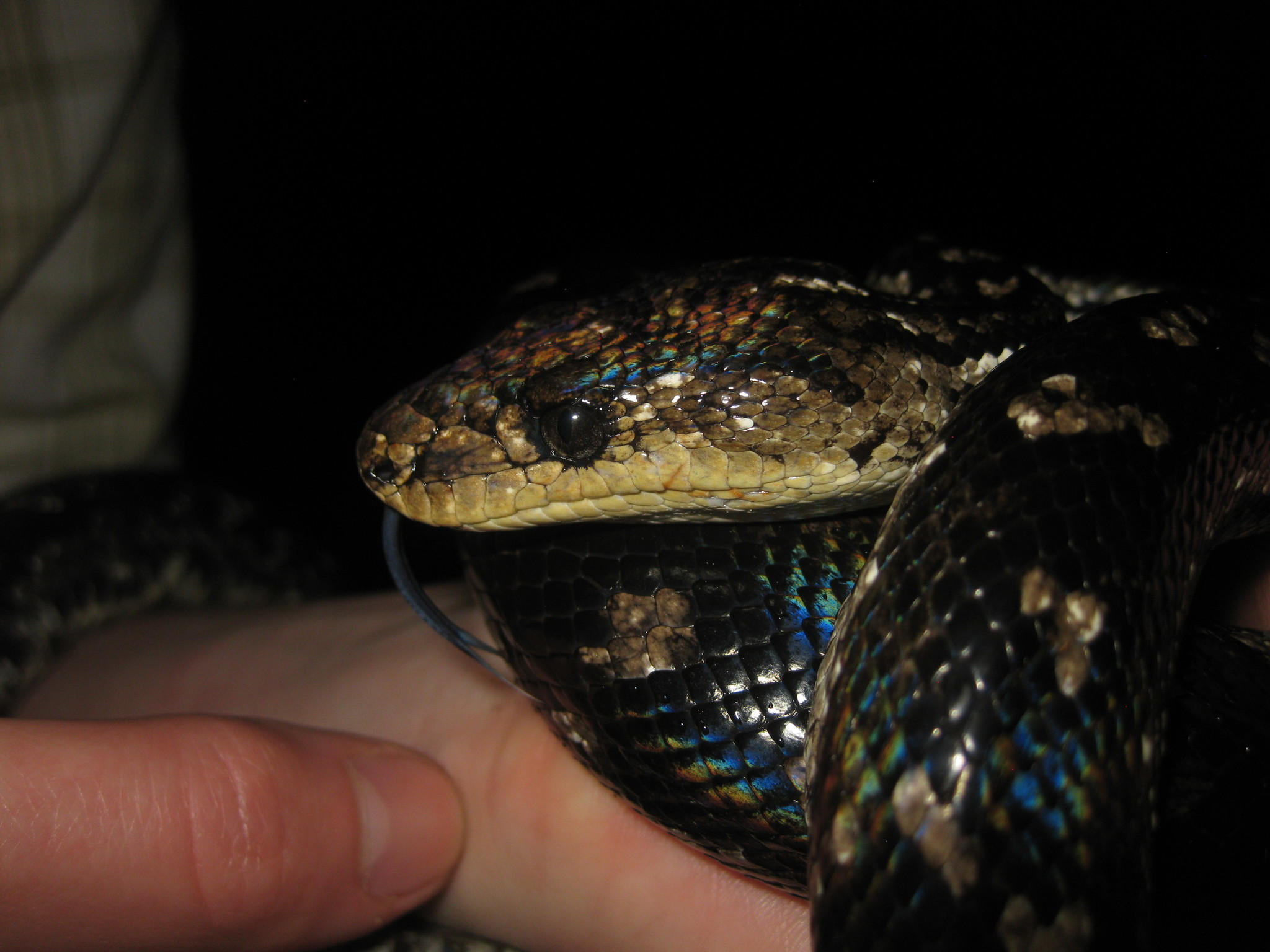
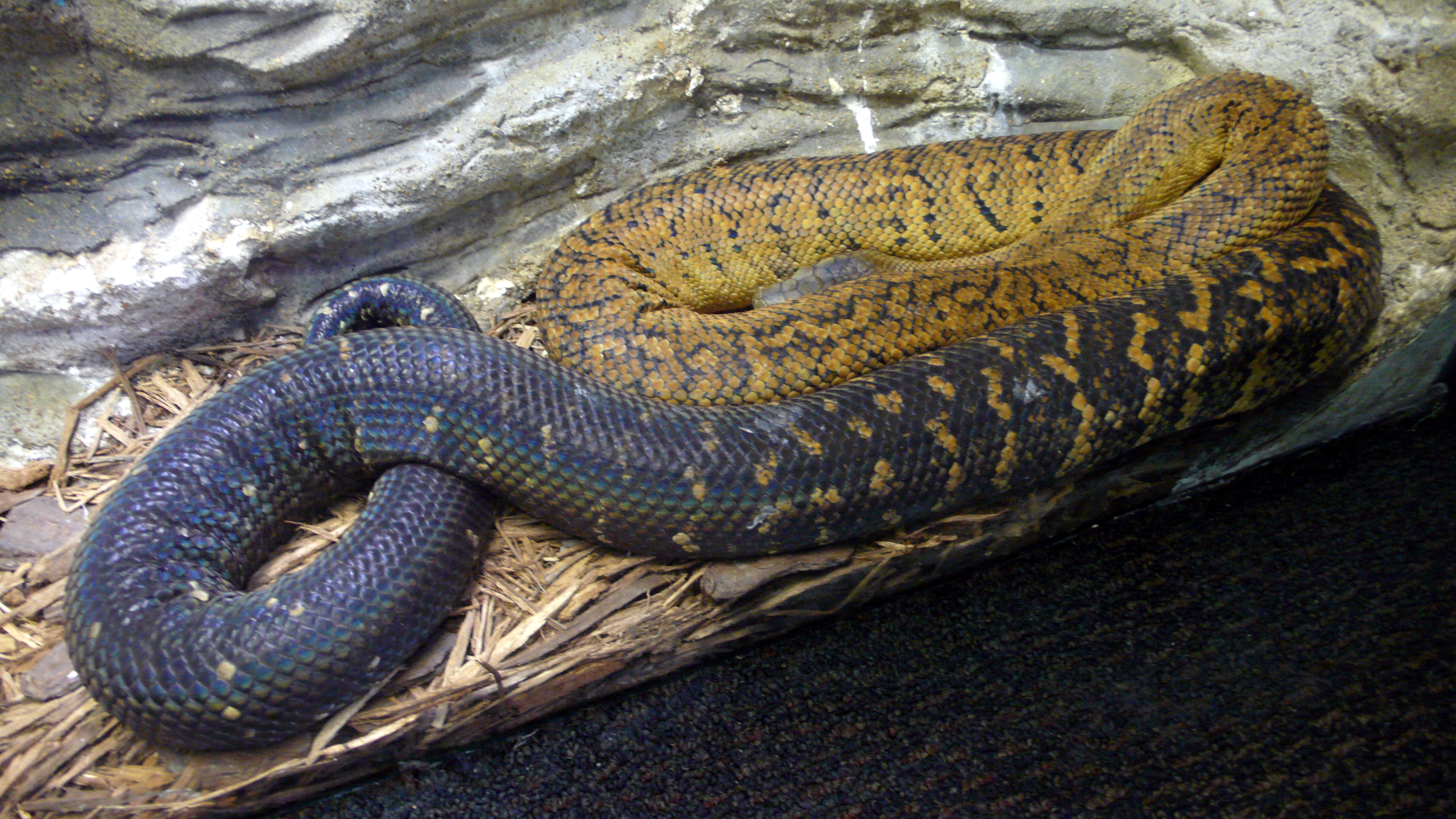
Species	Taxon author	Subsp.*	Common name(s)	Geographic range	Image
C. ampelophis	Landestoy, Reynolds & Henderson, 2021	0	n/a	Hispaniola (the Dominican Republic)
C. angulifer	(Cocteau & Bibron, 1840)	0	Cuban boa	Cuba and the adjacent islands (including Isla de la Juventud, the Archipiélago de los Canarreos in Cayo Cantiles, the Archipiélago de los Colorados off the northern coast of Pinar del Río, and the Archipiélago de Sabana-Camagüey on Cayo Guajaba and Cayo Sant María), as well as the Bahamas.
C. argentum	Reynolds, Puente-Rolón, Geneva, Aviles-Rodriguez & Herrmann, 2016	0	Conception Bank silver boa	Conception Bank, the Bahamas
C. chrysogaster	(Cope, 1871)	1	Turks and Caicos Islands boa	the Lucayan Archipelago, including the Turks and Caicos Islands (on Grand Turk Island, Middle Caicos, North Caicos, Big Ambergris Cay, Little Ambergris Cay and Long Cay) and the Bahamas (on Great Inagua and Sheep Cay)
C. exsul	(Netting & Goin, 1944)	0	Abaco Islands boa	Grand Bahama Island, Great Abaco Island, Elbow Cay and Little Abaco Island, the Bahamas
C. fordii	(Günther, 1861)	2	Ford's boa, Hispaniolan desert boa	Hispaniola (in both Haiti and the Dominican Republic) and the adjacent islands (Île de la Gonâve, Isla Saona and Isla Cabritos on Lake Enriquillo)
C. gracilis	Fischer, 1888	1	Hispaniolan vine boa	Hispaniola (in both Haiti and the Dominican Republic) north of the Plain of the Cul-de-Sac
C. granti	(Stull, 1933)	0	Virgin Islands boa	the British Virgin Islands (on Great Camanoe, Necker, Tortola and Virgin Gorda), Puerto Rico (on Culebra and Cayo Diablo) and the United States Virgin Islands (on Saint Thomas)
C. inornatus	(Reinhardt, 1843)	0	Puerto Rican boa	Puerto Rico
C. monensis	(Zenneck, 1898)	1	Mona Island boa	Mona Island and Cayo Diablo, Puerto Rico, as well as the United States Virgin Islands (on St. Thomas) and the British Virgin Islands (on Tortola, Great Camanoe, Necker and Virgin Gorda)
C. schwartzi	(Buden, 1975)		Crooked-Acklins boa	Crooked Island and Acklins in the Bahamas
C. striatus	(Fischer, 1856)	3	Hispaniolan boa	Hispaniola (in both Haiti and the Dominican Republic) and the adjacent islands (Île de la Tortue, Île à Vache, Saona)
C. strigilatus	(Cope, 1863)	4	Bahamian boa	the Bahamas
C. subflavus	(Stejneger, 1901)	0	Jamaican boa	Jamaica (including Goat Island)

- ) Not including the nominate subspecies.

^{T}) Type species.

Nota bene: A taxon author in parentheses indicates that the species was originally described in a genus other than Chilabothrus.
