= Oklahoma City Zoo and Botanical Garden =

Zoo and botanical garden in Oklahoma City, Oklahoma

- Oklahoma City Zoo and Botanical Garden
- Interactive map of Oklahoma City Zoo and Botanical Garden
- 35.5212°N 97.4724°W
- Date opened: 1902 (Wheeler Park Zoo); 1920 (as Lincoln Park Zoo)
- Location: Oklahoma City, Oklahoma, United States
- Land area: 130 acres (53 ha)
- No. of animals: 2,000+
- No. of species: 500+
- Annual visitors: 1.108 million (2024)
- Memberships: AZA, AAM
- Major exhibits: Cat Forest, Children's Zoo, Expedition Africa, Great EscApe, Herpetarium, Lion Overlook, Oklahoma Trails, Sanctuary Asia, Wetlands Walkway
- Website: www.okczoo.org

The Oklahoma City Zoo and Botanical Garden is a zoo and botanical garden located in Oklahoma City's Adventure District in northeast Oklahoma City, Oklahoma.

The zoo covers 130 acres (53 ha) and is home to more than 2,000 animals of more than 500 species. It is open every day except Thanksgiving and Christmas. The Oklahoma City Zoo is an accredited member of the Association of Zoos and Aquariums and the American Alliance of Museums. The zoo receives more than 1 million visitors a year.

== Exhibits ==
- Expedition Africa (12 acres or 4.8 hectares): the newest addition to the zoo, Expedition Africa is the largest-ever habitat expansion since opening. The area officially opened in 2024 and includes a state-of-the-art giraffe barn, a savanna area where multiple species mingle, and the renovated Love's Pachyderm Building, which includes animal habitats and a large event space.
- Sanctuary Asia (9.5 acres or 3.8 hectares): an Asian-themed section; which, right now, is home to the zoo's herd of Asian elephants. The elephant habitat is located in the southeast area of the zoo by Great EscApe, the state-of-the-art exhibit includes three spacious outdoor yards, pools, a waterfall, shade structures and barn with amenities including views into the barn from a raised boardwalk.
- The Children's Zoo: a place where children can explore and play, while connecting with nature and animals. Featuring Galápagos tortoises, flamingos, goats, monkeys, a play stream, and lorikeets.
- Great EscAPE (6 acres or 2.4 hectares): includes two troops of gorillas and a community of chimpanzees, in tropical rainforest plantings.
- Cat Forest/Lion Overlook (4.2 acres or 1.7 hectares): contains species of big and small cats including African lions, and tigers, with more than 4,000 plants replicating native environments.
- Oklahoma Trails: The total area of this exhibit is 7.7 acres or 3.1 hectares featuring animals native to Oklahoma, including black bears, alligators, bison, and over two dozen snakes. The exhibit includes a walk-in bird exhibit and a barn, which houses bats, skunks, and owls.
- Herpetarium: the herpetarium includes over 80 exhibits.

Other attractions within the zoo include the giraffe feeding platform, the Elephant Express tram, the Endangered Species Carousel, Stingray Bay, Wild Encounters, elephant presentations, Monarch Flyway Zipline, and the Jungle Gym Playground.

Surrounding the zoo are the Zoo Amphitheater, Lincoln Park, Northeast Lake and the Lincoln Park Golf Course. The zoo is located Oklahoma City's Adventure District at the crossroads of I-35 and I-44. Other attractions in the Adventure District are the National Cowboy and Western Heritage Museum, Science Museum Oklahoma (formerly called the Omniplex), the ASA National Softball Hall of Fame, and Remington Park Racing/Casino.

=== List of animals ===
Reptiles/amphibians

- Abaco Island boa
- Alligator snapping turtle
- Amazon Basin emerald tree boa
- Amazon tree boa
- American alligator
- Argentine horned frog
- Barred tiger salamander
- Bicolor poison dart frog
- Black-tailed rattlesnake
- Black rat snake
- Black tree monitor
- Boa constrictor
- Common snake-necked turtle
- Crocodile monitor
- Diamond python
- Eastern copperhead
- Eastern diamondback rattlesnake
- Eyelash palm pitviper
- Fijian banded iguana
- Gila monster
- Green anaconda
- Green and black poison dart frog
- Green tree python
- King cobra
- Lake Titicaca frog
- Madagascar tree boa
- Massasauga
- Prairie rattlesnake
- Red spitting cobra
- Red-eared slider
- Reticulated python
- Rock rattlesnake
- Shield-nosed cobra
- Sidewinder
- Speckled rattlesnake
- Suriname toad
- Timber rattlesnake
- Volcán Alcedo giant tortoise
- Western cottonmouth
- Western diamondback rattlesnake
- Western green mamba
- Western pygmy rattlesnake
- White's tree frog
- Woma python
- Woodhouse's toad

Mammals

- Addra gazelle
- African lion
- African wild dog
- American beaver
- American bison
- American black bear
- Asian elephant
- Bat-eared fox
- Black-footed cat
- Black-handed spider monkey
- Black-tailed prairie dog
- Bobcat
- Caracal
- Cheetah
- Chimpanzee
- Clouded leopard
- Common raccoon dog
- Cougar
- Coyote
- Crested porcupine
- Donkey
- Elk
- Fishing cat
- François' langur
- Goat (petting zoo)
- Goeldi's monkey
- Golden-headed lion tamarin
- Grevy's zebra
- Grizzly bear
- Indian rhinoceros
- Jaguar
- Meerkat
- North American river otter
- Ocelot
- Okapi
- Opossum
- Pig (petting zoo)
- Red panda
- Red river hog
- Red-rumped agouti
- Reticulated giraffe
- Ringtail cat
- Serval
- Sheep (petting zoo)
- Southern three-banded armadillo
- Spotted hyena
- Squirrel monkey
- Striped skunk
- Sumatran orangutan
- Sumatran tiger
- Swift fox
- Western lowland gorilla
- White-tailed deer
- Yellow-backed duiker

Birds

- African pygmy falcon
- American crow
- American flamingo
- American white ibis
- Andean condor
- Argentine ruddy duck
- Australian magpie
- Bald eagle
- Bali mynah
- Bare-faced ground dove
- Barn owl
- Black-bellied whistling duck
- Black-capped lory
- Black-naped fruit dove
- Black-necked stilt
- Blue-and-yellow macaw
- Blue-crowned motmot
- Bufflehead
- Burrowing owl
- Chicken (petting zoo)
- Chilean flamingo
- Cinnamon teal
- Cinereous vulture
- Coconut lorikeet
- Collared finch-billed bulbul
- Crested wood partridge
- East African crowned crane
- Eastern screech owl
- Edwards's pheasant
- Egyptian goose
- Eurasian eagle owl
- Great horned owl
- Greater roadrunner
- Killdeer
- Lark sparrow
- Laughing kookaburra
- Laysan teal
- Lesser white-fronted goose
- Madagascar buttonquail
- Mallard duck
- Mandarin duck
- Marbled teal
- Mourning dove
- Nene goose
- Northern bobwhite
- Northern cardinal (in the Trail's aviary and in the wild)
- Northern flicker
- Northern mockingbird
- Northern pintail
- Ostrich
- Pheasant pigeon
- Philippine duck
- Rainbow lorikeet
- Red-and-green macaw
- Red-billed blue magpie
- Red-billed hornbill
- Red-crested pochard
- Red-throated bee-eater
- Ringed teal
- Ring-necked pheasant
- Ruddy shelduck
- Sandhill crane
- Scissor-tailed flycatcher
- Southern cassowary
- Southern screamer
- Sun conure
- Superb starling
- Swainson's lorikeet
- Swan goose
- Tawny frogmouth
- Turkey vulture
- Von der Decken's hornbill
- Western meadowlark
- Wild turkey
- White-crested laughingthrush
- White-crowned robin-chat
- White-faced whistling duck
- White-necked raven
- White-vented bulbul
- Wrinkled hornbill
- Wood duck
- Yellow-breasted ground dove

Invertebrates

- Arizona blond tarantula
- Chaco golden knee tarantula
- Madagascar hissing cockroach
- Monarch butterfly (at the butterfly gardens)

Fish

- Blue catfish
- Bluegill
- Channel catfish
- Freshwater drum
- Largemouth bass
- Smallmouth bass
- Spotted gar
- Striped bass
- White bass
- White crappie

== Former exhibits ==
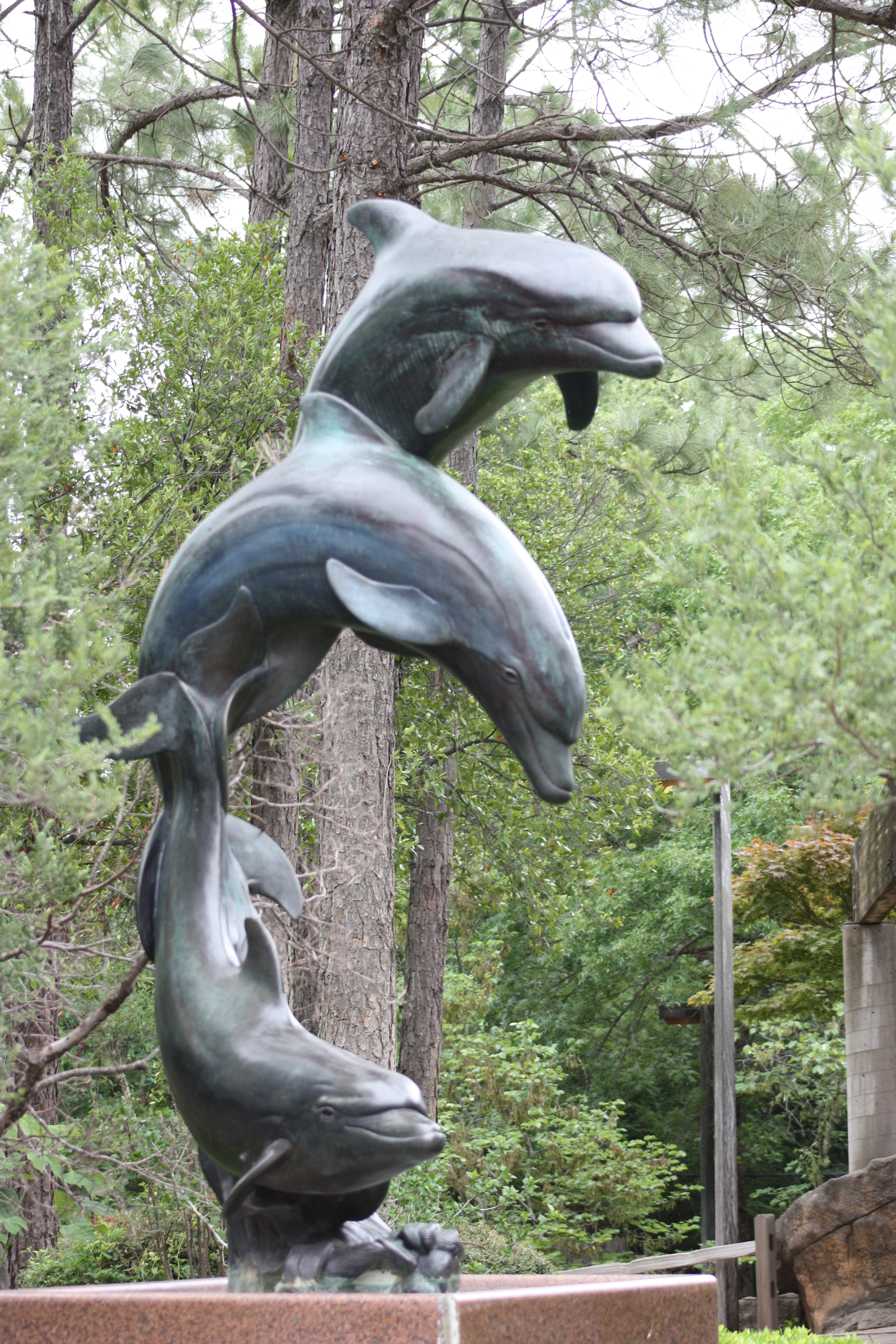
Dolphin sculpture.

- Dolphinarium: The zoo kept bottlenose dolphins from 1986 until 2001. To prevent further dolphin deaths, the dolphins were returned to Mississippi, and the exhibit now hosts sea lions.
- Monkey Island: Located at the entrance, monkeys would play, eat, and even sleep on a specially made island that was dug down into the ground. Opened in 1935 and dismantled in 1998. The decision was made to get rid of it because zoo visitors would either drop or throw hazardous materials on to the island, and the monkeys would choke. The island was closed and filled in. Today, there is a plaza at the entrance, with a gift shop, a restaurant, and the ZooFriends' office surround a floor where monkey island once was. From 1935 to 1985, there was a ship on the island.
- Primate House: Built in the 1950s. The apes were kept there until 1993. In 1993, the apes were given a more natural habitat. The building was torn down and the Canopy Food Court was built in its place.

== Famous animals ==
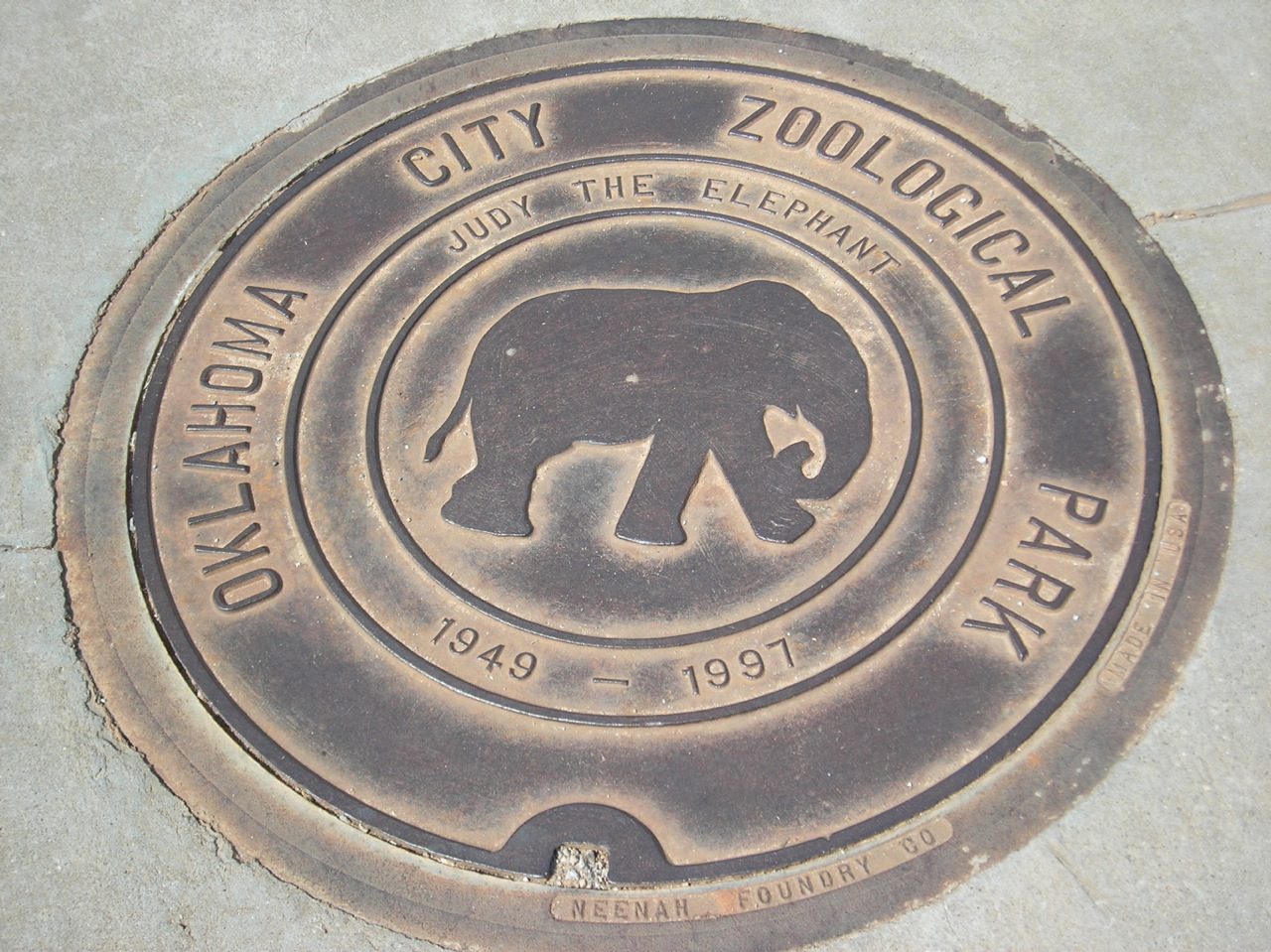
Commemorative manhole cover for Judy the elephant.

Judy was a famous elephant of the zoo having been a part of the zoo for almost 50 years.

Malee was an Asian elephant born April 15, 2011, weighing 300 pounds, the child of one of the Oklahoma City Zoo's elephants, Asha, and a male elephant named Sneezy who lives at the Tulsa Zoo. The Zoo held birthday parties for her every year. On September 30, 2015, zookeepers noticed discoloration of her trunk. After two failed treatments, she died at 4 AM CST on October 1, 2015. The cause of death was determined to be elephant endotheliotropic herpesvirus, which the other elephants at the zoo aside from her sister Achara also had.

Tusko was a male Indian elephant who was subject to a controversial drug experiment at the zoo, when it was then known as the Lincoln Park Zoo. On August 3, 1962, researchers from the University of Oklahoma injected him with 297 mg of LSD (lysergic acid diethylamide), which is nearly three thousand times the human recreational dose (for an animal weighing roughly one hundred times as much as a human). Within five minutes he collapsed to the ground and one hour and forty minutes later he died. It is believed that the LSD was the cause of his death, although some speculate that the drugs the researchers used in an attempt to revive him may have contributed to his death.

== Gallery ==
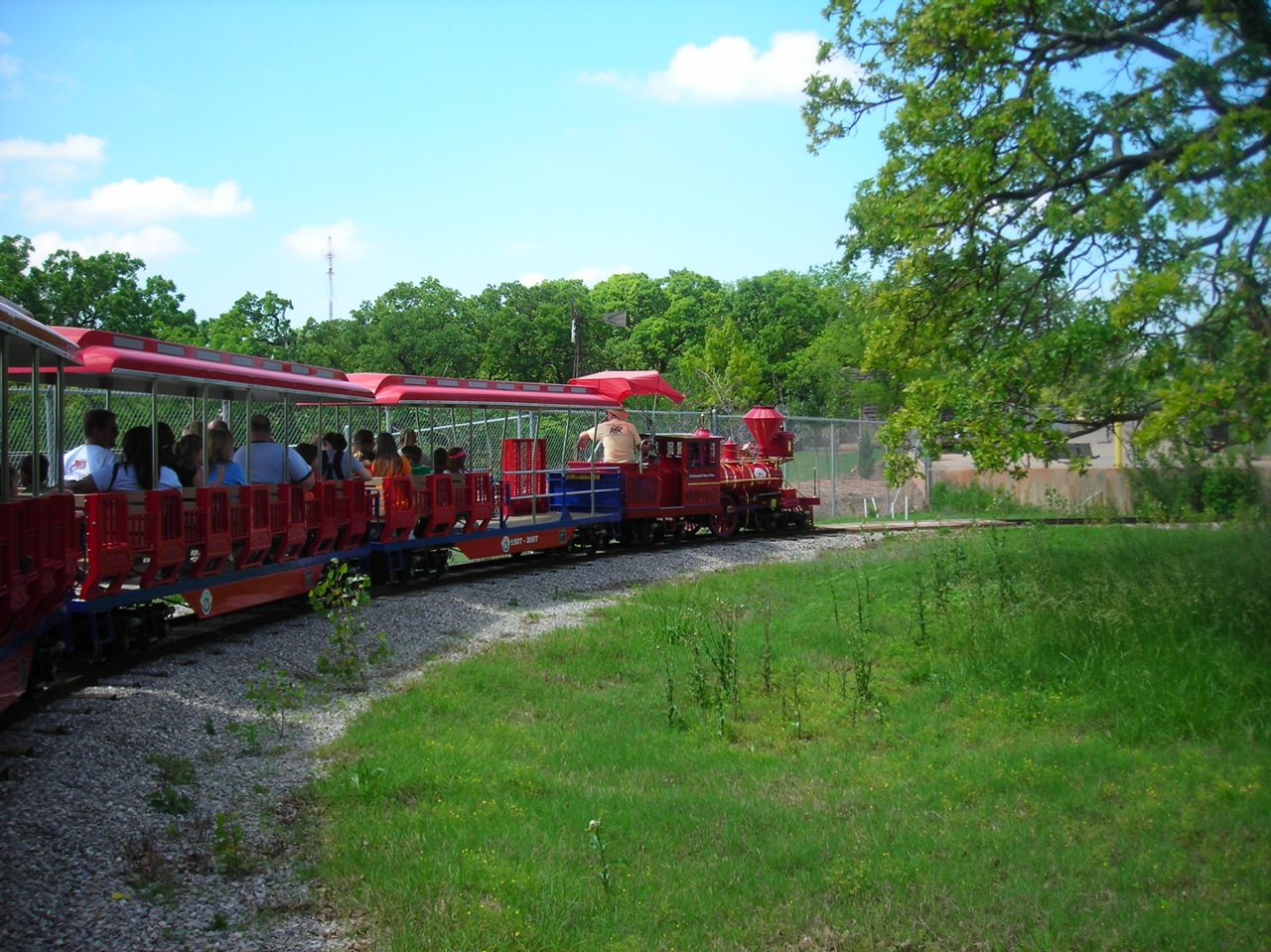
Zoo train.

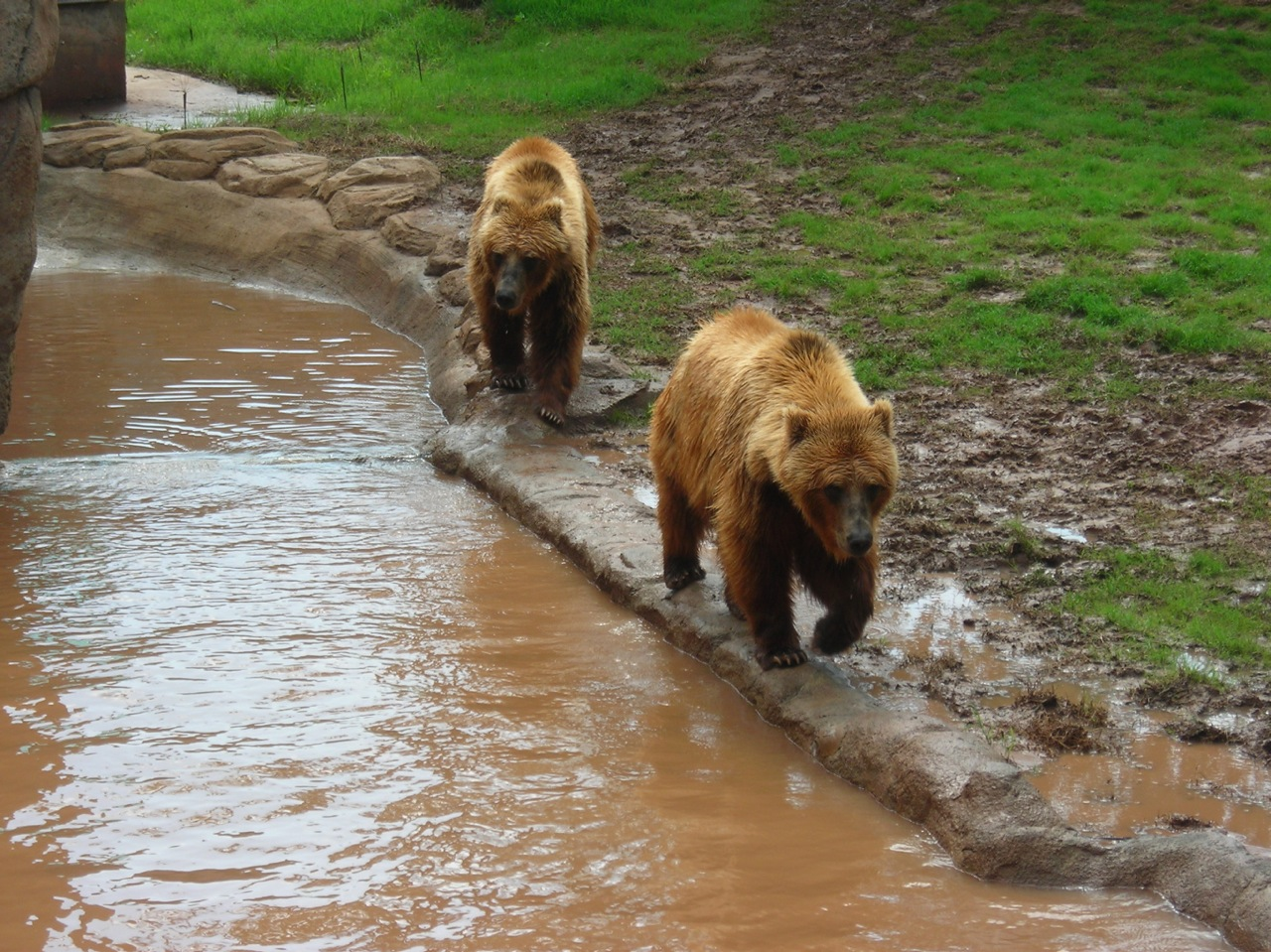
Bear habitat.

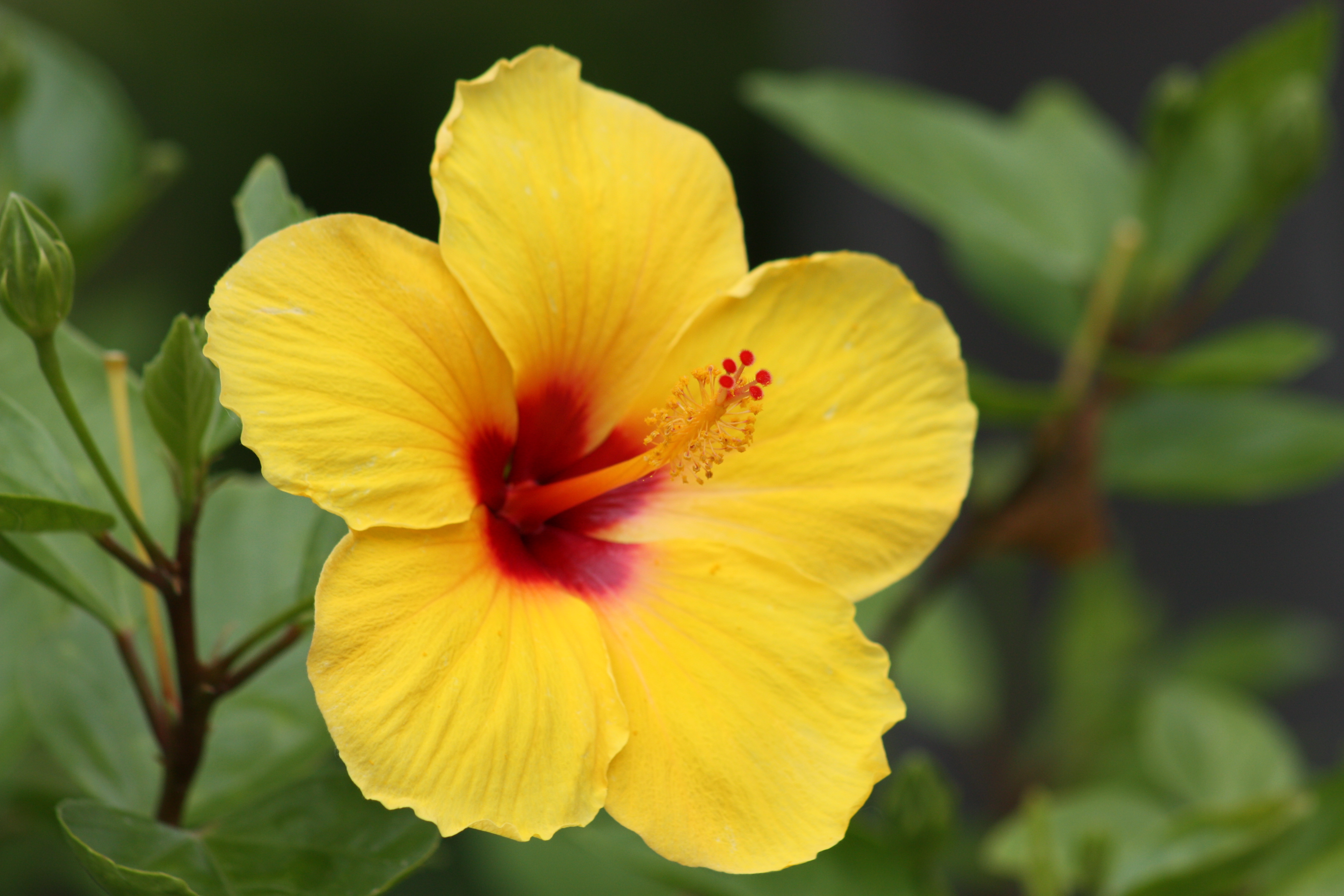
Many flowering plants at the Botanical Gardens.

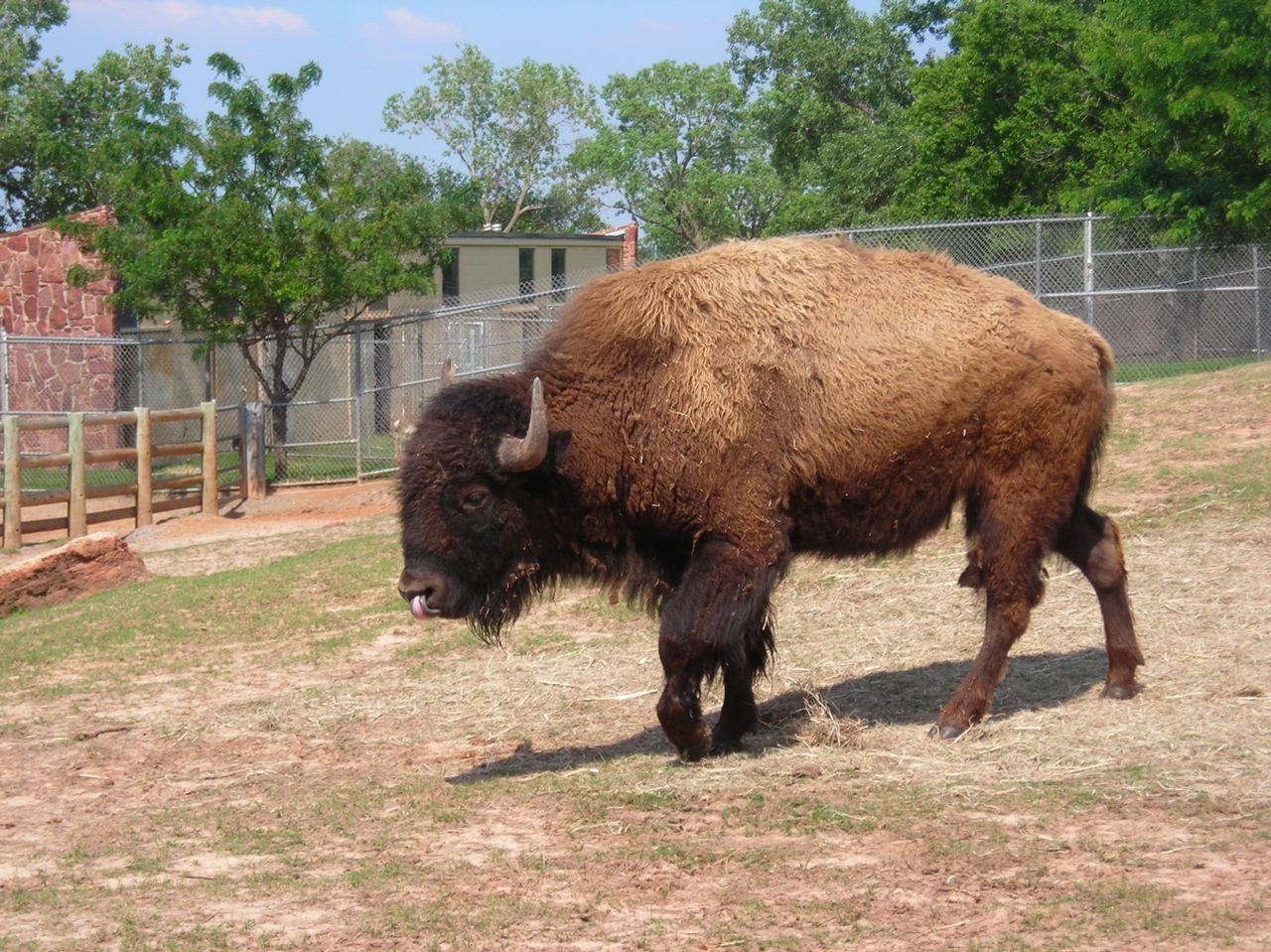
American bison (Bison bison).

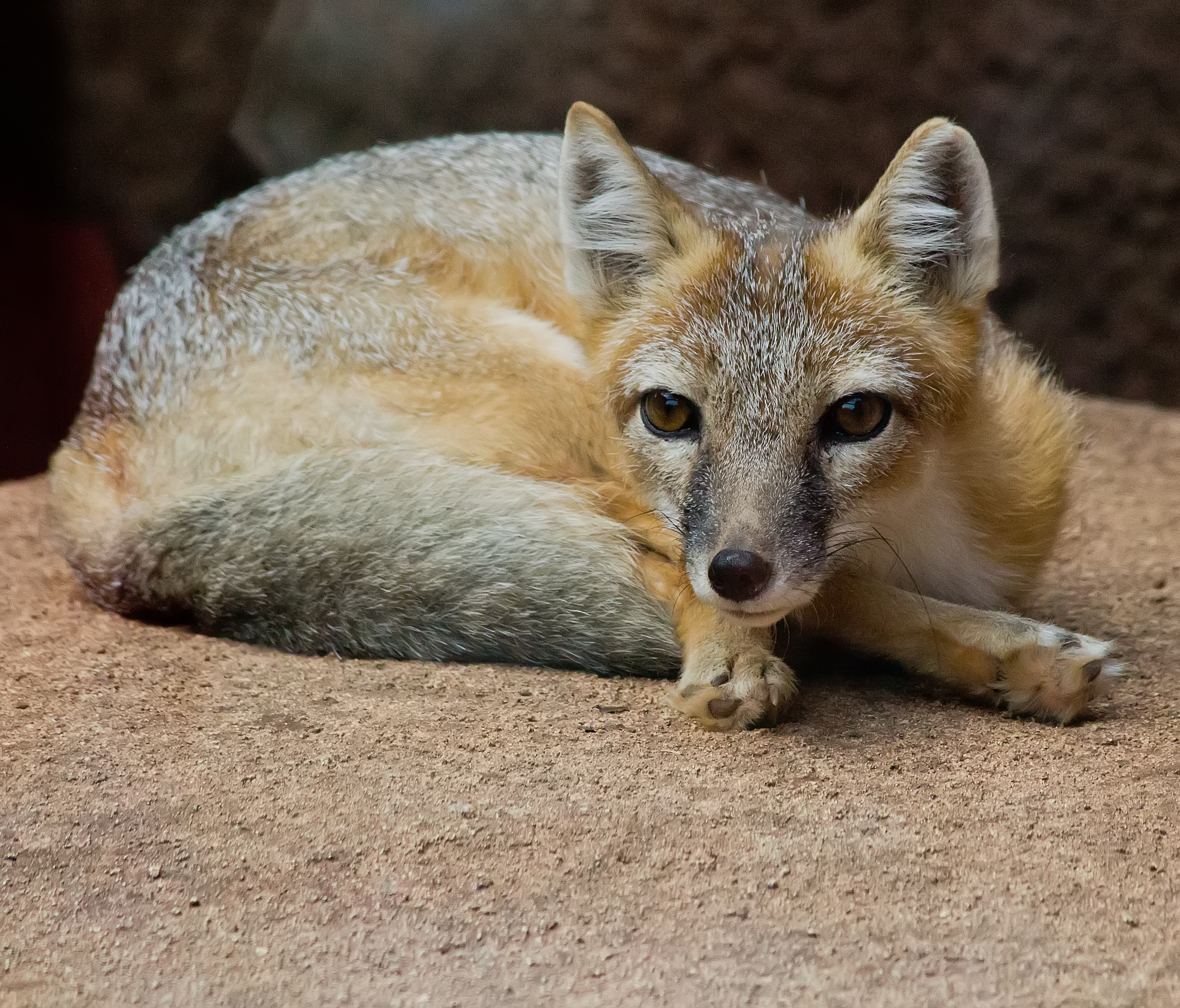
Swift fox (Vulpes velox).

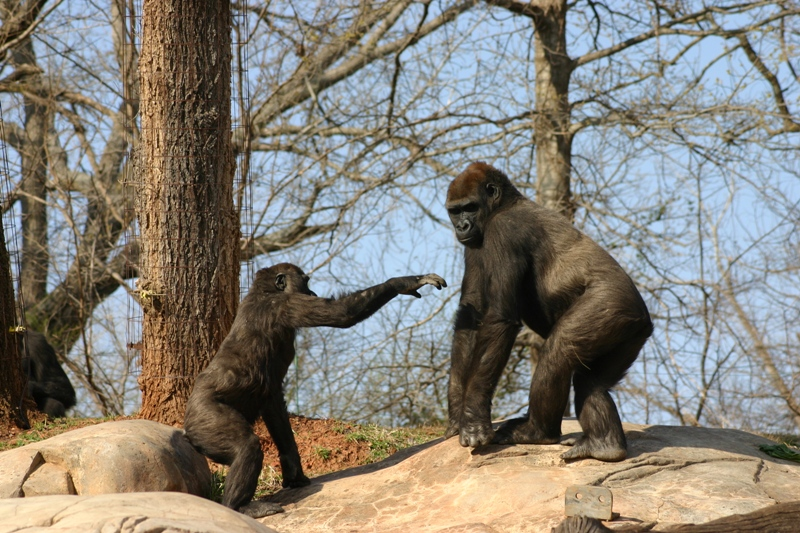
Gorillas.

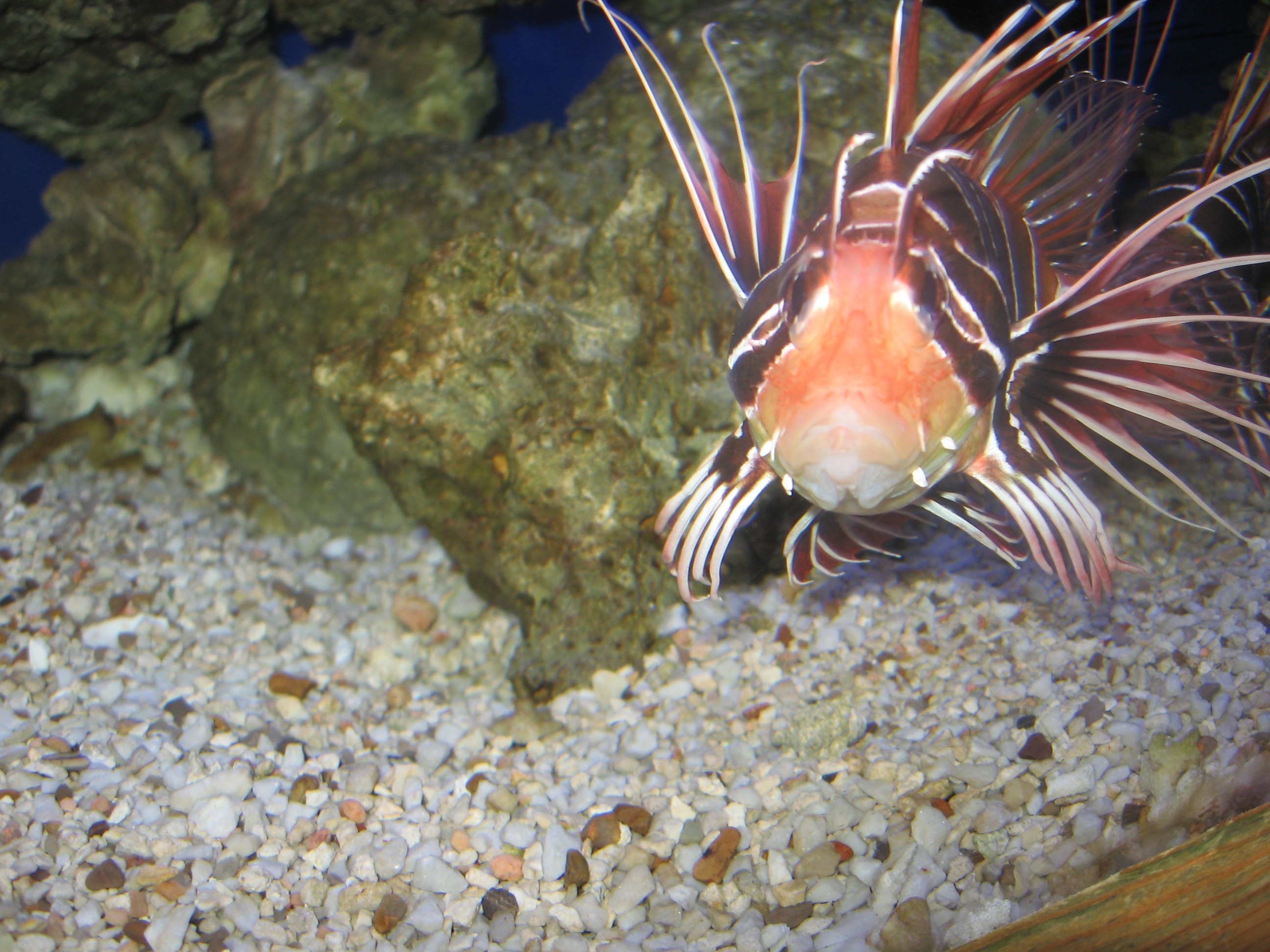
Clearfin lionfish (Pterois radiata) at the aquarium.

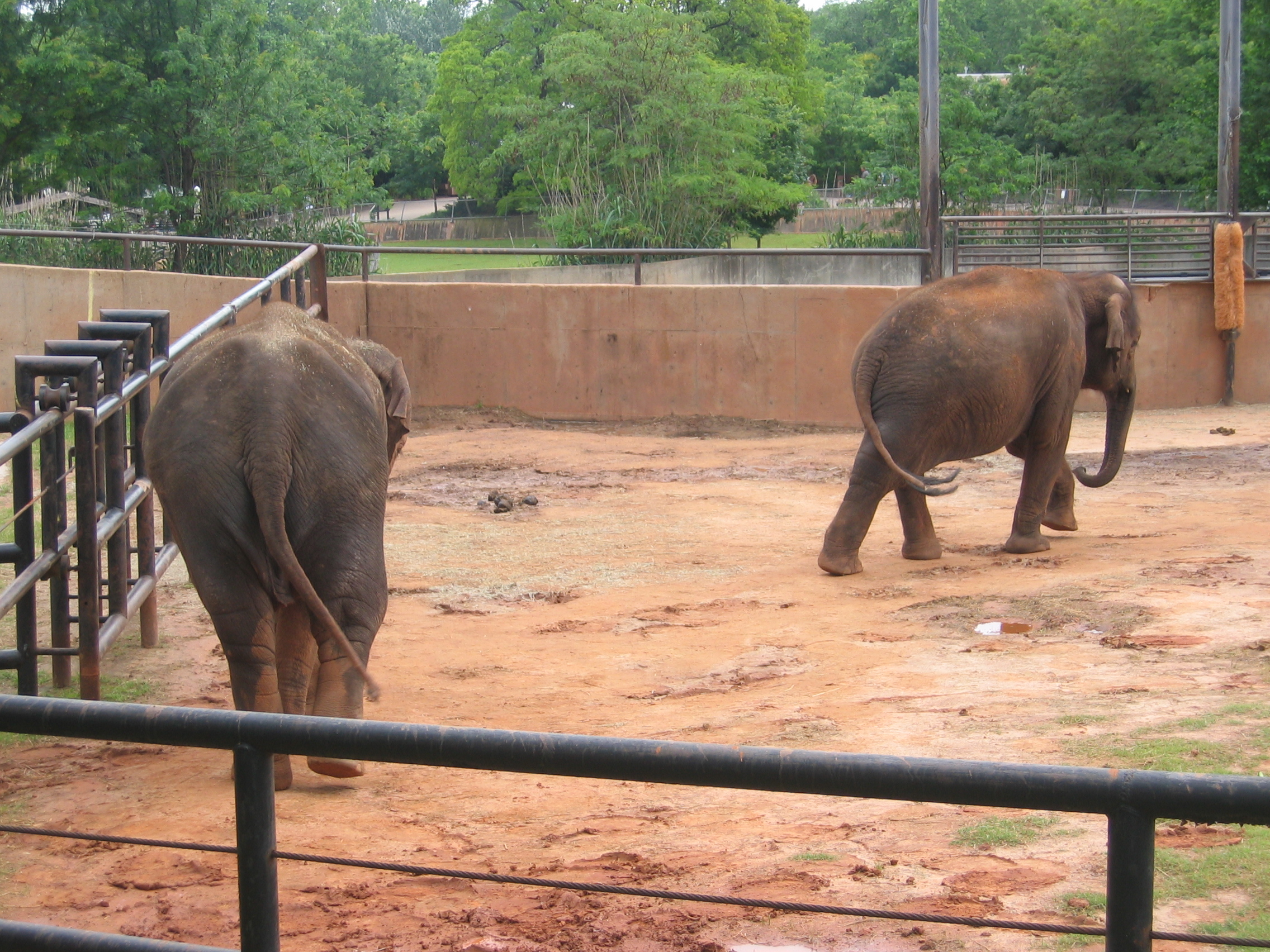
Elephants.

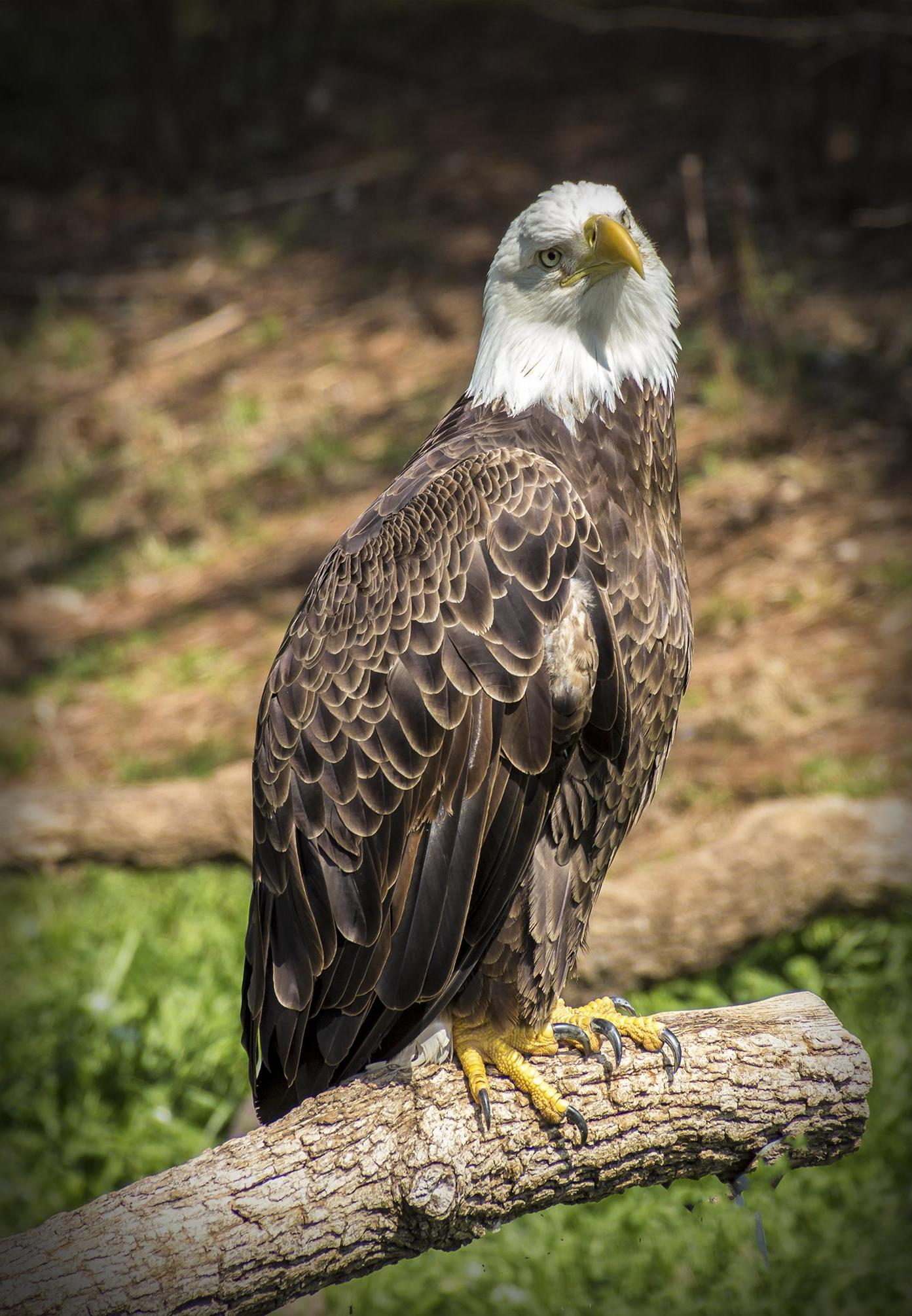
Bald eagle (Haliaeetus leucocephalus).

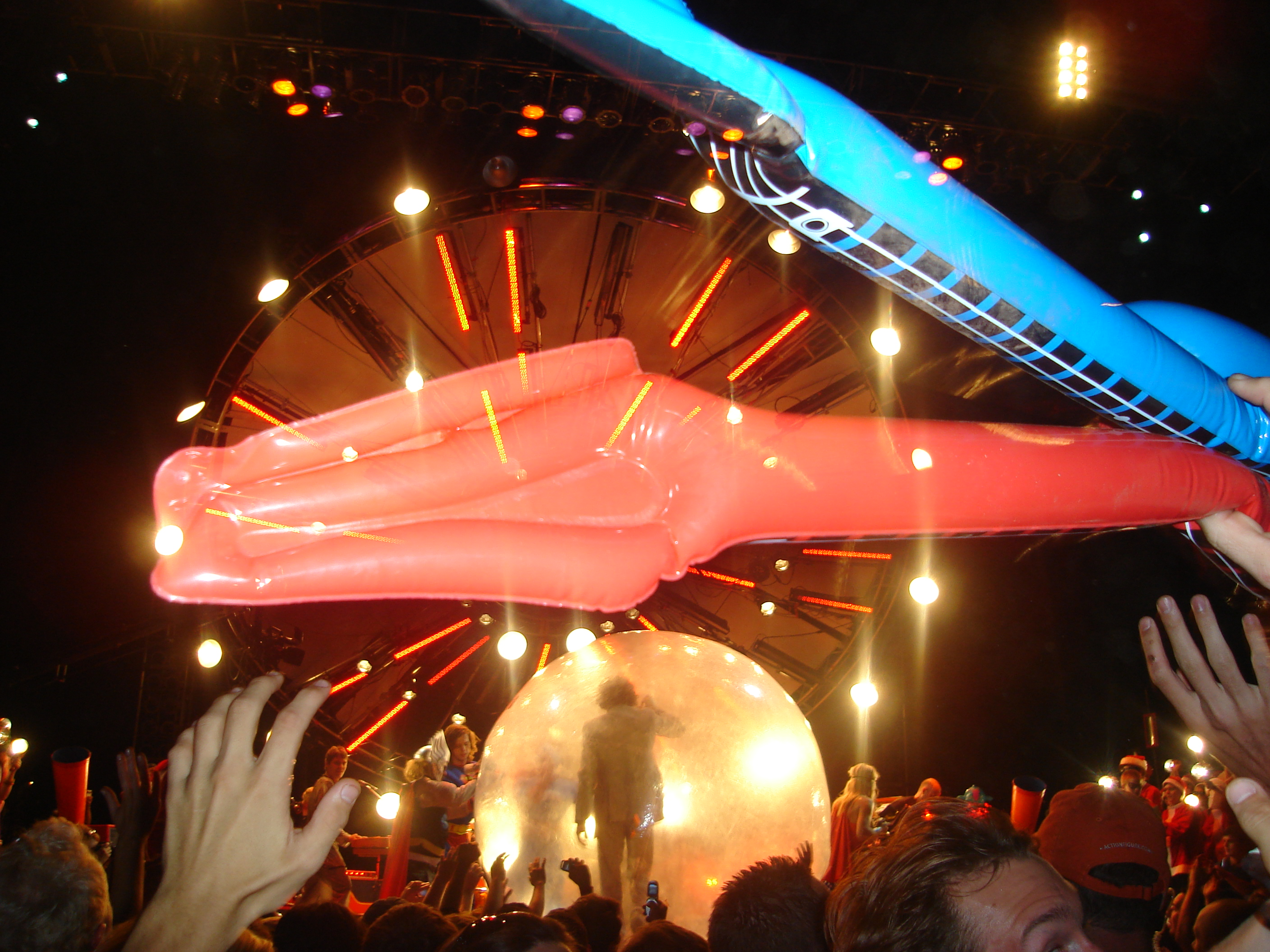
Many performances are held at the Zoo Amphitheater.

== See also ==
- List of botanical gardens and arboretums in the United States
