= Chilabothrus schwartzi =

Conservation status
- Endangered (IUCN 3.1)

Scientific classification
- Kingdom: Animalia
- Phylum: Chordata
- Class: Reptilia
- Order: Squamata
- Suborder: Serpentes
- Family: Boidae
- Genus: Chilabothrus
- Species: C. schwartzi

Binomial name
- Chilabothrus schwartzi (Buden, 1975)

Synonyms
- Epicrates chrysogaster schwartzi Buden, 1975

Species of snake

Chilabothrus schwartzi, also known as the Crooked-Acklins boa or Crooked Aklins boa, is a species of snake. It is endemic to the southern Bahamas, specifically to Crooked Island and Acklins. It was originally described as a subspecies of Epicrates chrysogaster (now Chilabothrus chrysogaster), but it was elevated to full species status in 2018. In fact, molecular data suggest a closer relationship with Chilabothrus argentum than with Chilabothrus chrysogaster.

== Etymology ==
The specific name, schwartzi, is in honor of American herpetologist Albert Schwartz.

== Description ==
Chilabothrus schwartzi can reach at least 785 mm (30.9 in) in snout–vent length. There are 1–2 loreal scales (most often one), 8–10 circumorbital scales, and 13 supralabial scales. Ventral scales are immaculate cream-colored. Dorsal coloration is grayish-silver in adults and reddish-orange in juveniles. There are frequently (but not always) elongated saddle blotches of slightly darker color than the dorsal ground color, extending nearly to the ventral scales. Postorbital stripe is absent.

== Habitat and conservation ==
Specimens have been found actively foraging low (about 1.5 m (5 ft) high) in trees and bushes, and on the ground.

As of 2020, Chilabothrus schwartzi has not been included in the IUCN Red List of Threatened Species. Its range likely covers two relatively large islands, but it appears to be rare, or at least restricted to specific habitats. Threats to it are unknown, but likely include persecution, roadkills, and introduced vertebrate predators.
