= Conception Island National Park =

National Park on Conception Bank, Bahamas

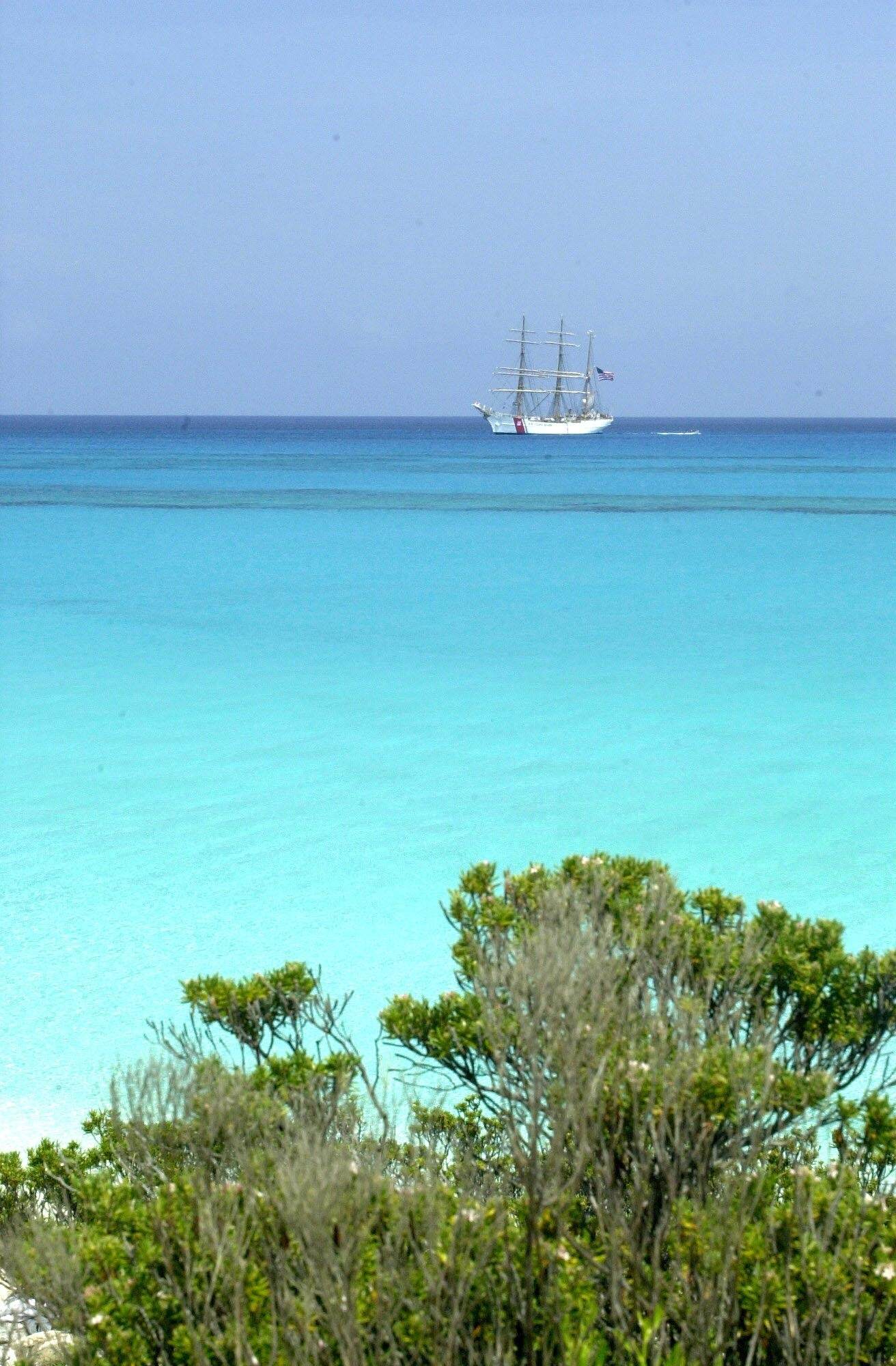
- Conception Island, Bahamas

- Location within Bahamas
- Location: Conception Island, The Bahamas
- Coordinates: 23.835350°N 75.113858°W
- Area: 30,000 acres (12,141 ha)
- Established: 1964
- Governing body: Bahamas National Trust
- Website: bnt.bs/conception-island-national-park/

The Conception Island National Park is a protected area in The Bahamas. The park, which covers Conception Bank, lies between Cat Island to the north and Rum Cay to the south. The vegetation consists of mangrove communities, with typical strand vegetation, and the island is an important hatching sites for green turtles, an Important Bird Area, with many species of bird known to visit. It is also home to the endemic Conception Bank silver boa, discovered in 2015.

== The park ==
The park has a land area of 810 hectares (2,000 acres) and a maximum altitude of 20 m (66 ft). It is administered by the Bahamas National Trust. It covers Conception Bank, which consists of Conception Island, Booby Cay, the South Rocks and various other scattered islets.

Washington Irving identified Conception Island as the site of one of Christopher Columbus' landfalls during his 1492 voyage, but this early theory was not supported by other historians and writers (either at the time or subsequently), who identified different claimant islands as the site of Columbus's landfall.

== Flora and fauna ==
The island has an extensive area of mangrove-dominated habitat and typical strandline vegetation. It is one of the most important hatching sites for the green sea turtle in The Bahamas, with its mangroves and Conception Creek, a salty bay of Conception Island, being hotspots of green turtle activity. Exploitation of the island's green turtle population is prohibited by law, but enforcing this protection is difficult, and turtles are occasionally removed from their habitat by visitors to the island.

In 2015, a previously unknown species of boa was discovered on the island, and subsequently given the name Conception Bank silver boa (Chilabothrus argentum), the name being a reference to the fact it was first found in a silver palm. The boa is endemic to the park.

The park is considered an Important Bird Area, with at least 68 species of bird being known to visit the park, and out of those Antillean nighthawks, Audubon's shearwaters, brown noddies, bridled terns, royal terns, sooty terns and white-tailed tropicbirds are known to nest in the area.

== Sources ==
- Bjorndal, Ka; Bolten, Ab; Chaloupka, My (2003). "Survival probability estimates for immature green turtles Chelonia mydas in the Bahamas". Marine Ecology Progress Series. 252: 273–281. doi:10.3354/meps252273. ISSN 0171-8630.
- R. Graham Reynolds; Sandra D. Buckner (6 February 2023). "Characterization of the bird diversity of Conception Island National Park, The Bahamas". Journal of Caribbean Ornithology. 36: 17–25. doi:10.55431/jco.2023.36.17-25. ISSN 1544-4953.
