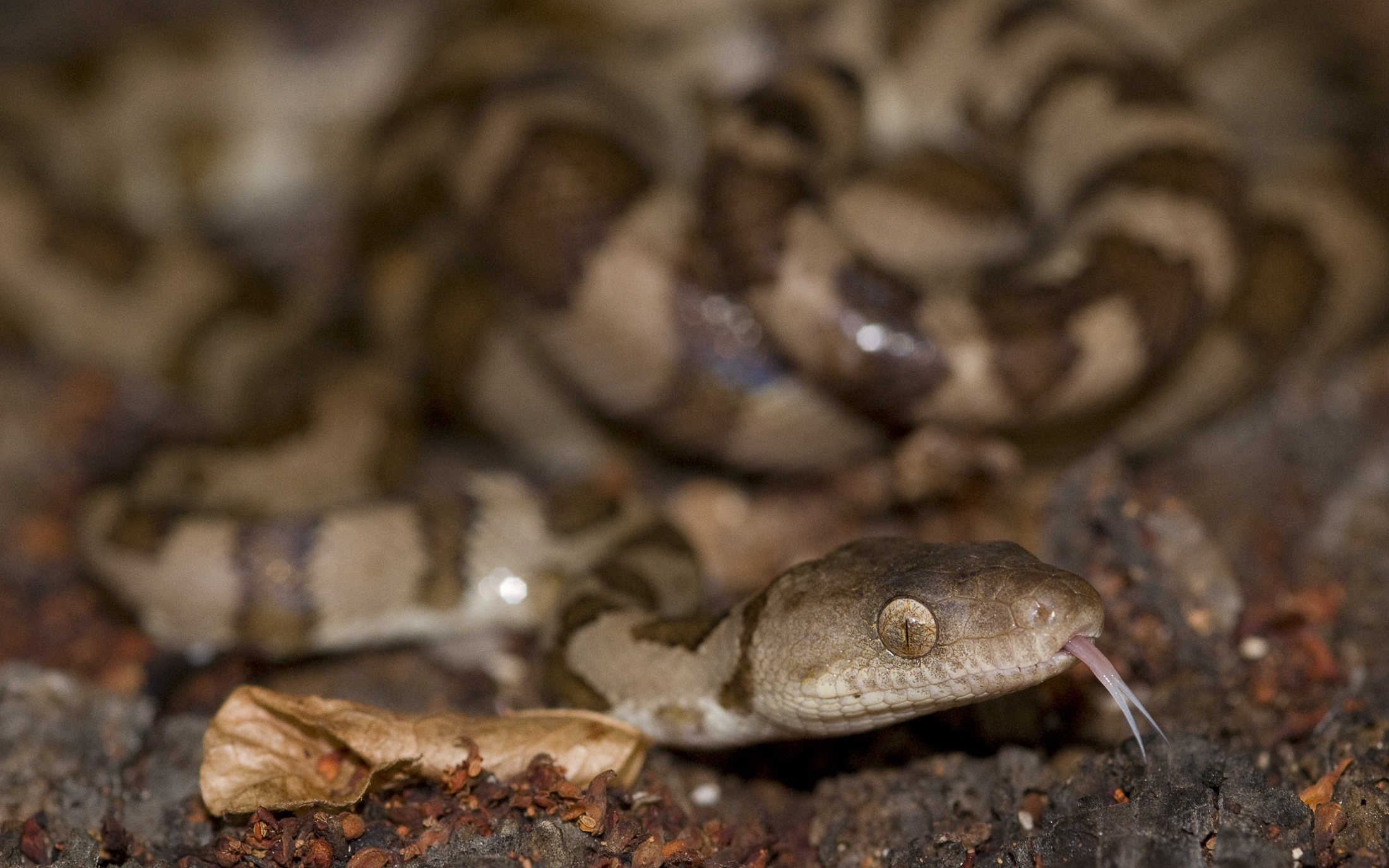

Conservation status
- Near Threatened (IUCN 3.1)
- CITES Appendix I

Scientific classification
- Kingdom: Animalia
- Phylum: Chordata
- Class: Reptilia
- Order: Squamata
- Suborder: Serpentes
- Family: Boidae
- Genus: Chilabothrus
- Species: C. monensis

Binomial name
- Chilabothrus monensis (Zenneck, 1898)

Synonyms
- Epicrates monensis Zenneck, 1898; Epicrates gracilis monensis — Stimson, 1969; Epicrates monensis — Schwartz & Henderson, 1991; Chilabothrus monensis — Reynolds et al., 2013; Epicrates monensis — Wallach et al., 2014

= Mona Island boa =

Species of snake

Chilabothrus monensis, also called commonly the Virgin Islands boa in the Virgin Islands, and the Mona Island boa elsewhere, is a species of snake in the family Boidae. The species is native to the West Indies. There are no subspecies.

== Distribution and habitat ==
C. monensis is found in the Puerto Rican archipelago, around Mona Island and Cayo Diablo near Puerto Rico, in the U.S. Virgin Islands, and in the British Virgin Islands: Tortola, Great Camanoe, Necker and Virgin Gorda.

== Predation ==
In Puerto Rico, Mona Island boas may be eaten by some growth stage of invasive boa constrictors.
