= Chilabothrus ampelophis =

Scientific classification
- Kingdom: Animalia
- Phylum: Chordata
- Class: Reptilia
- Order: Squamata
- Suborder: Serpentes
- Family: Boidae
- Genus: Chilabothrus
- Species: C. ampelophis

Binomial name
- Chilabothrus ampelophis Landestoy, Reynolds, & Henderson, 2021

Species of snake

Chilabothrus ampelophis is a species of snake in the family Boidae. The species is endemic to the Dominican Republic.
