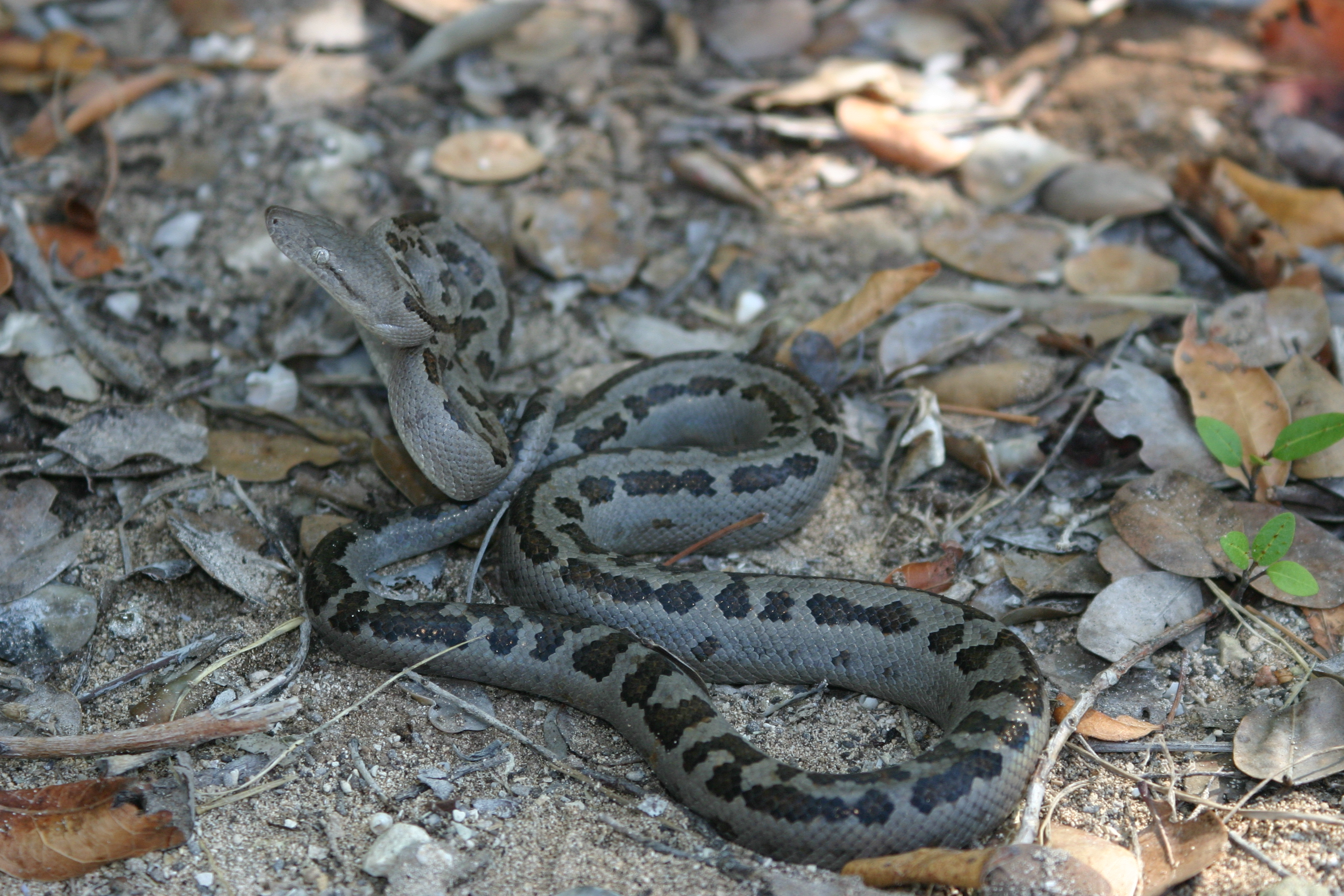

Conservation status
- Near Threatened (IUCN 3.1)

Scientific classification
- Kingdom: Animalia
- Phylum: Chordata
- Class: Reptilia
- Order: Squamata
- Suborder: Serpentes
- Family: Boidae
- Genus: Chilabothrus
- Species: C. chrysogaster

Binomial name
- Chilabothrus chrysogaster (Cope, 1871)

Synonyms
- Homalochilus chrysogaster Cope, 1871; Epicrates chrysogaster Stejneger, 1904; Chilabothrus chrysogaster Reynolds et al., 2013

= Chilabothrus chrysogaster =

Species of snake

Chilabothrus chrysogaster, commonly known as the Turks and Caicos Islands boa or the Southern Bahamas boa, is a species of snake found in the Southern Bahamas (Great Inagua, Sheep Cay) and the Turks and Caicos Islands. Local names include the rainbow boa (not to be confused with Epicrates cenchria, the "real" rainbow boa), the Bahamas cat boa, the rainbow snake, and the fowl snake. Like all boids, it is not a venomous species.

== Subspecies ==
Two subspecies are recognized:

- Chilabothrus chrysogaster chrysogaster (Cope, 1871) – Turks and Caicos Islands boa – the Turks and Caicos Islands
- Chilabothrus chrysogaster relicquus (Barbour & Shreve, 1935) – Great Inagua boa – the Bahamas (Great Inagua and Sheep Cay)

A third subspecies, Chilabothrus chrysogaster schwartzi (Buden, 1975) from the Bahamas (Crooked Island and Acklins), was formerly recognized, but is now elevated to full species status (i.e., Chilabothrus schwartzi).

Nota bene: A trinomial authority in parentheses indicates that the subspecies was originally described in a genus other than Chilabothrus.

== Description ==
Turks and Caicos Islands boas are nocturnal, and actively forage for lizards, birds, and rodents. They prefer either tropical dry forest habitat or scrub vegetation with plenty of large, flat rocks. Adults reach a maximum size of over 70 inches (180 cm) or more, but more often they are around 32 inches (81 cm) long.

There are three color morphs of this species: spotted, striped, and no-pattern. The spotted version seems to be the most common, followed by striped and finally the very uncommon no-pattern snakes, which are mostly solid gray with a few dark markings. Juveniles are orange or red and long and thin. Rarely, some adults will retain the juvenile coloration.

== Threats ==
There are three primary threats to this species:

1. Introduced predators: Turks and Caicos Islands boas are extremely vulnerable to predation by cats and rats. Cats can likely decimate or exterminate populations of boas on small islands.
2. Human persecution: People are often afraid of snakes and will kill them on site, mistakenly believing that they are venomous, harmful, or demonic entities.
3. Habitat loss: The Turks and Caicos Islands are being rapidly developed. Boas must compete with people for habitat and suitable places to live. Because they are very slow moving, snakes are easily killed when trying to cross the roads that run through their habitat. They cannot dodge passing cars, and a road through their habitat can drastically reduce reproductive adults in a population.

== Distribution and habitat ==
In the Bahamas, the Turks and Caicos Islands boa is found on Great Inagua and Sheep Cay. In the Turks and Caicos Islands, it is found on 10 islands, nine of which are on the Caicos Bank. Boas are occasionally still found on Providenciales, though this population has likely been decimated in the last 30 years and is in danger of extirpation. Though originally reported from Grand Turk, the Turks and Caicos Islands boa now appears to be only found on islands on the Caicos Bank and a few of the Turks Cays.
