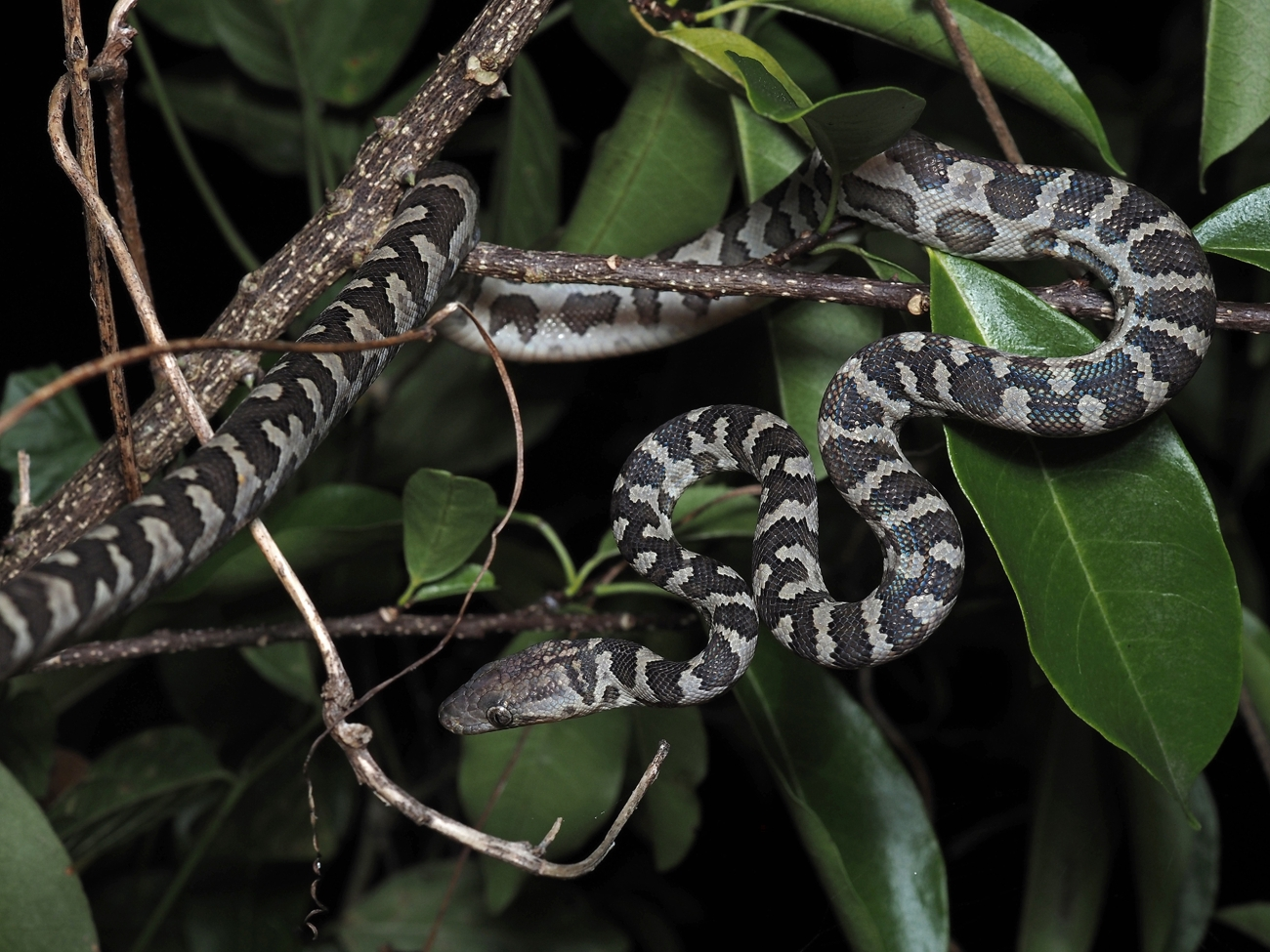

Conservation status
- Endangered (IUCN 3.1)

- Endangered (ESA)

Scientific classification
- Kingdom: Animalia
- Phylum: Chordata
- Class: Reptilia
- Order: Squamata
- Suborder: Serpentes
- Family: Boidae
- Genus: Chilabothrus
- Species: C. granti

Binomial name
- Chilabothrus granti (Stull, 1933)

Synonyms
- Epicrates inornatus granti Stull, 1933; Epicrates monensis granti Sheplan & Schwartz, 1974; Epicrates granti Platenberg & D.S. Harvey, 2010; Chilabothros granti Rodríguez-Robles et al., 2015

= Chilabothrus granti =

Species of snake

Chilabothrus granti, also known commonly as the Virgin Islands boa, is a species of snake in the family Boidae. The species is native to the Caribbean.

== Etymology ==
The specific name, granti, is in honor of American herpetologist Chapman Grant.

== Geographic range ==
C. granti is found in Puerto Rico, the British Virgin Islands, and the U.S. Virgin Islands.

== Habitat ==
The preferred natural habitats of C. granti are forest and shrubland at altitudes from sea level to 100 m (330 ft), but it has also been found in gardens.

== Diet ==
C. granti preys upon frogs (including Cuban tree frogs), lizards (Anolis and Iguana), and other snakes.

== Predation ==
In Puerto Rico, Virgin Islands boas may be eaten by some growth stage of invasive boa constrictors.

== Reproduction ==
C. granti is viviparous.
