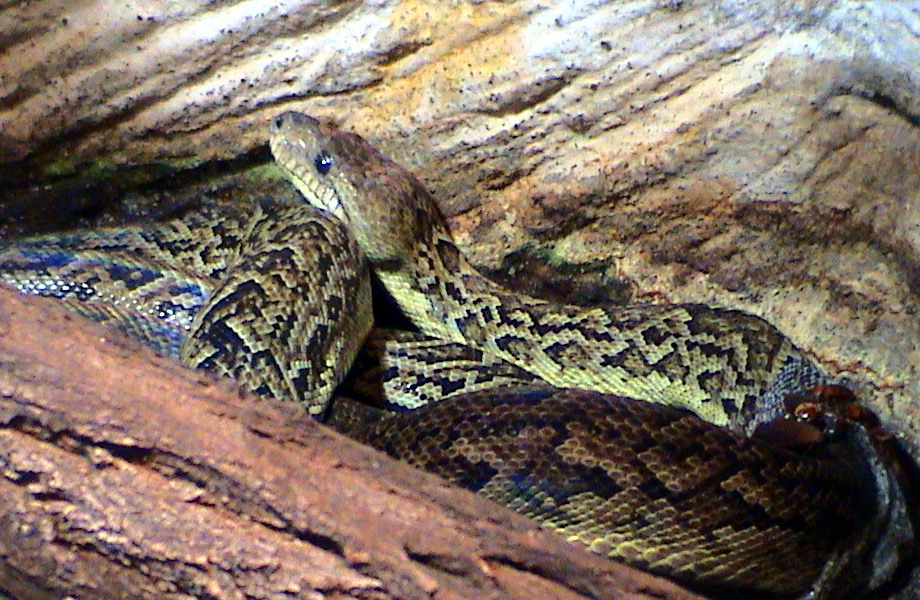

Conservation status
- Least Concern (IUCN 3.1)

Scientific classification
- Kingdom: Animalia
- Phylum: Chordata
- Class: Reptilia
- Order: Squamata
- Suborder: Serpentes
- Family: Boidae
- Genus: Chilabothrus
- Species: C. angulifer

Binomial name
- Chilabothrus angulifer (Cocteau & Bibron, 1840)

Synonyms
- Epicrates angulifer Cocteau & Bibron, 1840; Epicrates angulifer — Boulenger, 1893; Chilabothrus angulifer — Reynolds et al., 2013

= Cuban boa =

Species of snake

The Cuban boa (Chilabothrus angulifer), also known as the Cuban tree boa and by locals as Majá de Santa María, is a very large species of snake in the family Boidae. With lengths exceeding 5 m (16 ft) and a relatively heavy build, the Cuban boa is one of the largest snakes in North America. The species is native to Cuba and some nearby islands. No subspecies are currently recognized.

== Etymology ==
The genus name Chilabothrus is from the Greek cheilos, meaning "lip", á "without" and bothros "pits". The specific name originates from the Latin word angirlus, meaning "angle", probably in reference to the angular shapes of the main elements of the dorsal pattern.

== Geographic range ==
Chilabothrus angulifer is found in Cuba and on adjacent islands, including Isla de la Juventud (formerly called the Isle of Pines), the Canarreos Archipelago (the Cayo Cantiles), the Colorados Archipelago off the northern coast of Pinar del Río, the Sabana-Camagüey Archipelago (Cayo Guajaba and Cayo Sant María). The type locality given is "Cuba".

== Habitat ==
The preferred natural habitat of Chilabothrus angulifer is forest of several varieties (rainforest, cloud forest, evergreen forest, semi-deciduous forest, thorn forest, coastal scrub forest), at altitudes from sea level to 1,214 m (3,983 ft). It has also been found in sugar cane plantations.

== Description ==
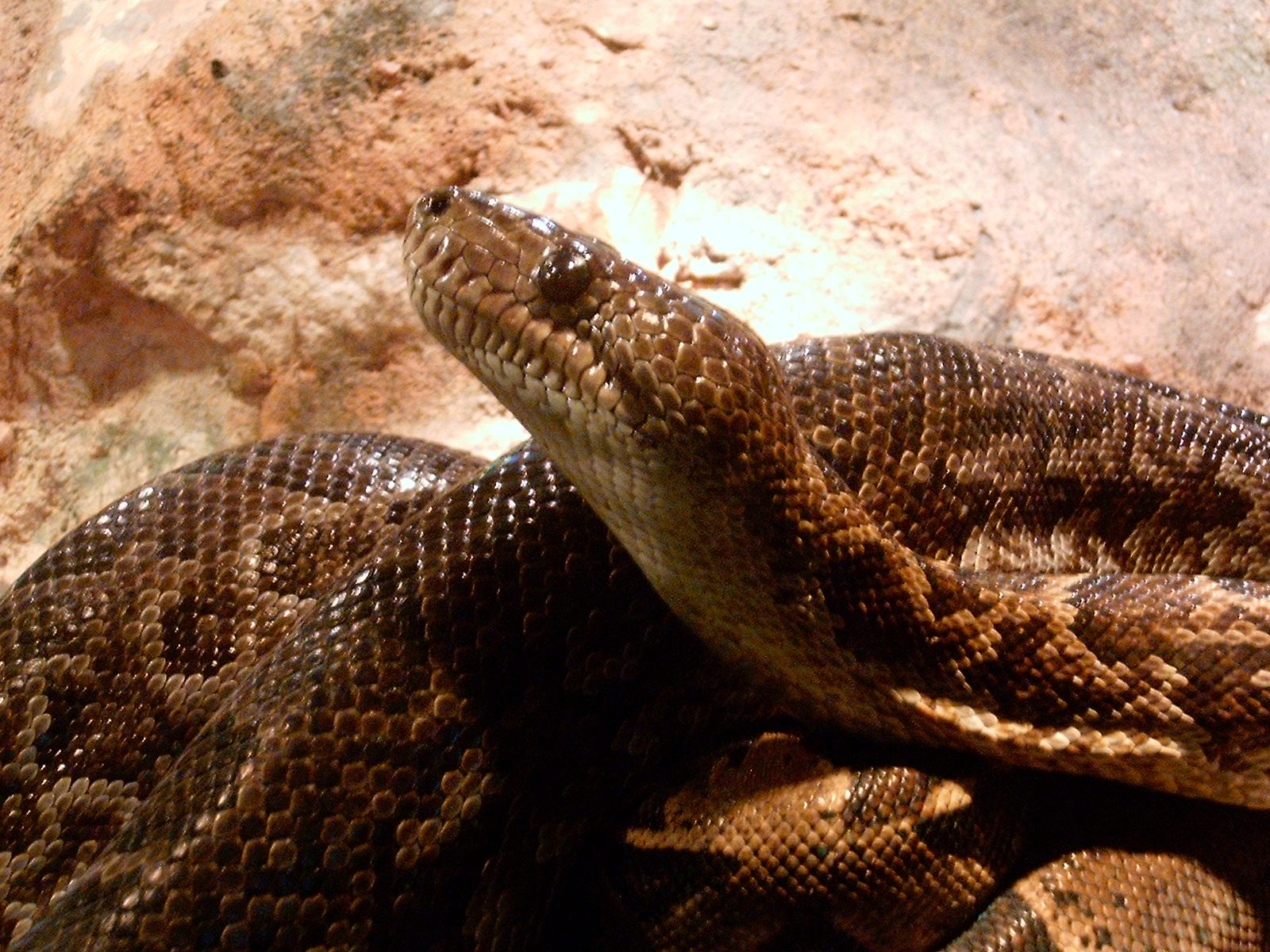
Cuban boa at Budapest Zoo

The presence of labial pits, the shortest tail of the entire genus and supralabials separated from the eye result in the Cuban boa being the least derived species of the genus Chilabothrus. It is also the largest member of Chilabothrus. The Cuban boa has a quite massive body, of a size typical for a boa or python of far greater length.

=== Size ===
C. angulifer is the largest snake in Cuba and the West Indies, with specimens exceeding 5 m (16 ft) in total length (tail included) and 30 kg (66 lb) in weight. The largest individual measured 5.65 m (18.5 ft) long and was estimated at more than 40 kg (88 lb) in mass. Gundlach (1875, 1880) stated that he had seen individuals of about 6.4 m (21 ft) in total length. He also mentioned one large individual kept in captivity by him that had a length of 4.57 m (15.0 ft) and was collected at the Zapata Swamp, Matanzas Province. Rodríguez (1876) commented that the largest specimens are able grow up to 5.49 m (18.0 ft) long and 25–28 cm (9.8–11.0 in) in diameter. However, on average C. angulifer reaches 3.66 m (12.0 ft) in total length.

=== Coloring ===
Coloration brown with a pattern of staggered dark brown rhombic spots. Dorsal pattern of 42–65 appressed, angulate, dark brown to black markings on a yellowish to yellow-tan ground, but often (western Cuba) without any dark colors in dorsal pattern, and pattern composed of indeterminate number of medium brown to pale tan, much-fused markings; tail patternless above, or with up to 12 darker dorsal markings.

=== Scalation ===
C. angulifer possesses 53–69 dorsal scale rows at midbody; 272–292 ventral scales in males, 268–290 in females; 45–55 subcaudal scales in males, 46–54 in females; 321–347 ventrals + subcaudals in males, 316–339 in females; supralabial scales separated from eye. C. angulifer is different from most other species of the genus in that the eye is usually completely separated from the supralabials by a row of lorilabials, and the subcaudals are few.

== Behavior ==
Despite its large size, the Cuban boa is semi-arboreal and climbs fairly well. It is usually solitary, sometimes intersecting during the mating season.

=== Diet ===
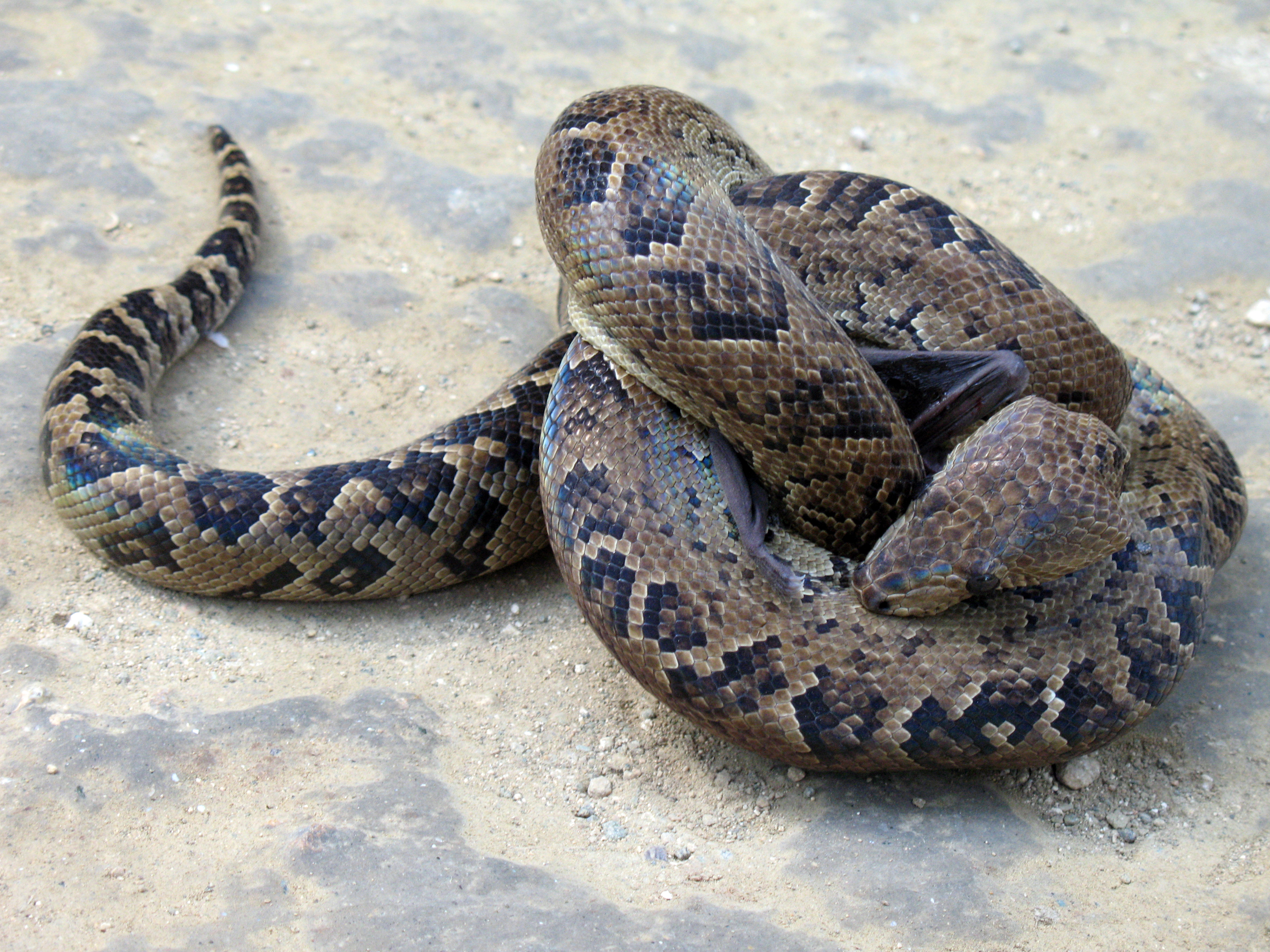
Cuban boa swallowing a bat

Chilabothrus angulifer is a terrestrial apex predator in Cuba along with the Cuban crocodile and carnivorous birds. Depending on age, size and health, prey can range from anurans, lizards, giant tropes, Cuban sliders, aquatic birds (purple gallinules), free-ranging raptors (red-tailed hawks, turkey vultures), forest birds (Columbiformes, Cuculiformes, Passeriformes), caged birds (Columbiformes, Galliformes, crested caracaras, Passeriformes, Psittaciformes), free-ranging poultry (Muscovy ducks, Galliformes), bats, goats, sheep, pigs, dogs, cats, European rabbits, hutias and rats. As a result of data from the literature and field studies, 351 prey items were recorded in 49 different taxa obtained from 218 snakes. Warm-blooded (mammals and birds) made up 96%, while cold-blooded (reptiles and amphibians) only 4%. Mammals made up 54.7% of the total prey items consumed, followed by birds (41.3%), while amphibians (2%) and reptiles (2%) made up only a small part of the diet. The prey species most frequently consumed were domestic fowl (Gallus domesticus) (24.8%), Desmarest's hutias (Capromys pilorides) (14.5%), two bat species (Jamaican fruit-eating bat, Artibeus jamaicensis: 8.8%; Cuban flower bat, Phyllonycteris poeyi: 6.0%), and black rats (Rattus rattus) (7.7%).

=== Reproduction ===
Chilabothrus angulifer is viviparous. Females are biennial breeders and take five or more years to mature. Mating season is normally April through June. Males will mate every year and engage in ritualized combat. Size, not age, determines the female's ability to reproduce. Gestation in the wild is typically 150–180 days. Gestation length appears to reflect the temperatures the females are exposed to while gravid. Parturition normally takes place in September and October. Litter sizes range from 2–22 young in the wild. There appears to be a correlation between the size of the female and litter/neonate size: the larger the female, the larger the litters and babies. Neonatal C. angulifer are among the largest within the family (505–646 mm SVL, 80–237 g). Only neonatal Boa constrictor and Eunectes murinus are of comparable sizes.

=== Maturation ===
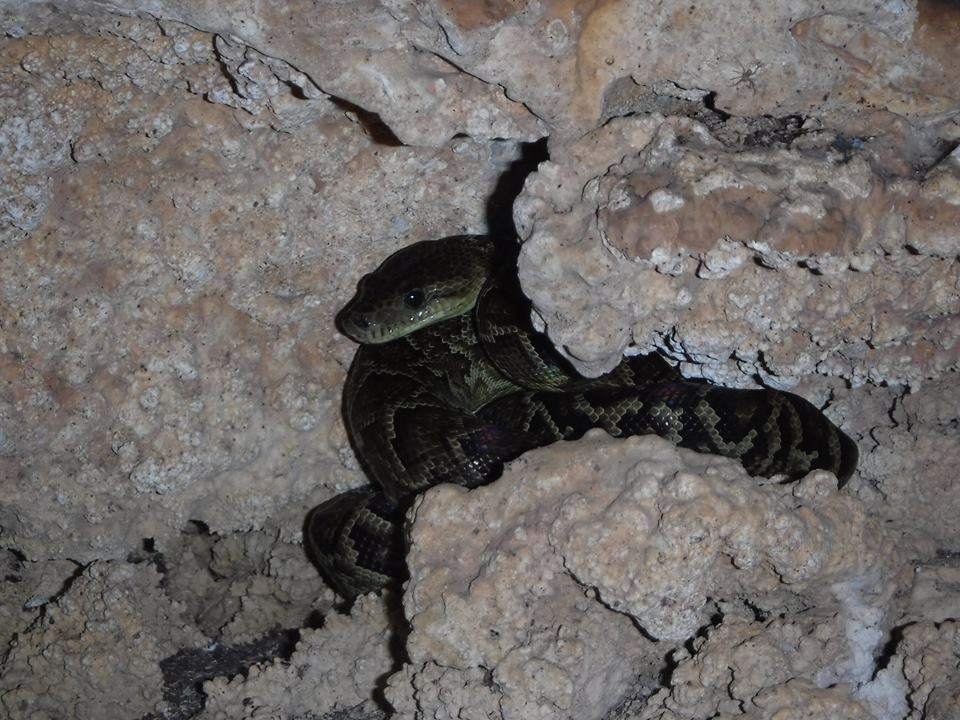
Young Cuban boa

Chilabothrus angulifer reaches maturation for breeding at three years old for males, and five years old for females. Captive snakes reach breeding maturity at larger sizes than non-captive snakes.

=== Longevity ===
In the wild, Cuban boas can live in excess of 30 years. Although the reproductive potential is still poorly understood, long term studies are quantifying the missing or inconclusive data. In captivity, specimens continuously reproduced at the age of 30 plus years.

== Conservation status ==
Chilabothrus angulifer was classified as "Least Concern" (LC) in 2021.

== See also ==
- List of largest snakes
