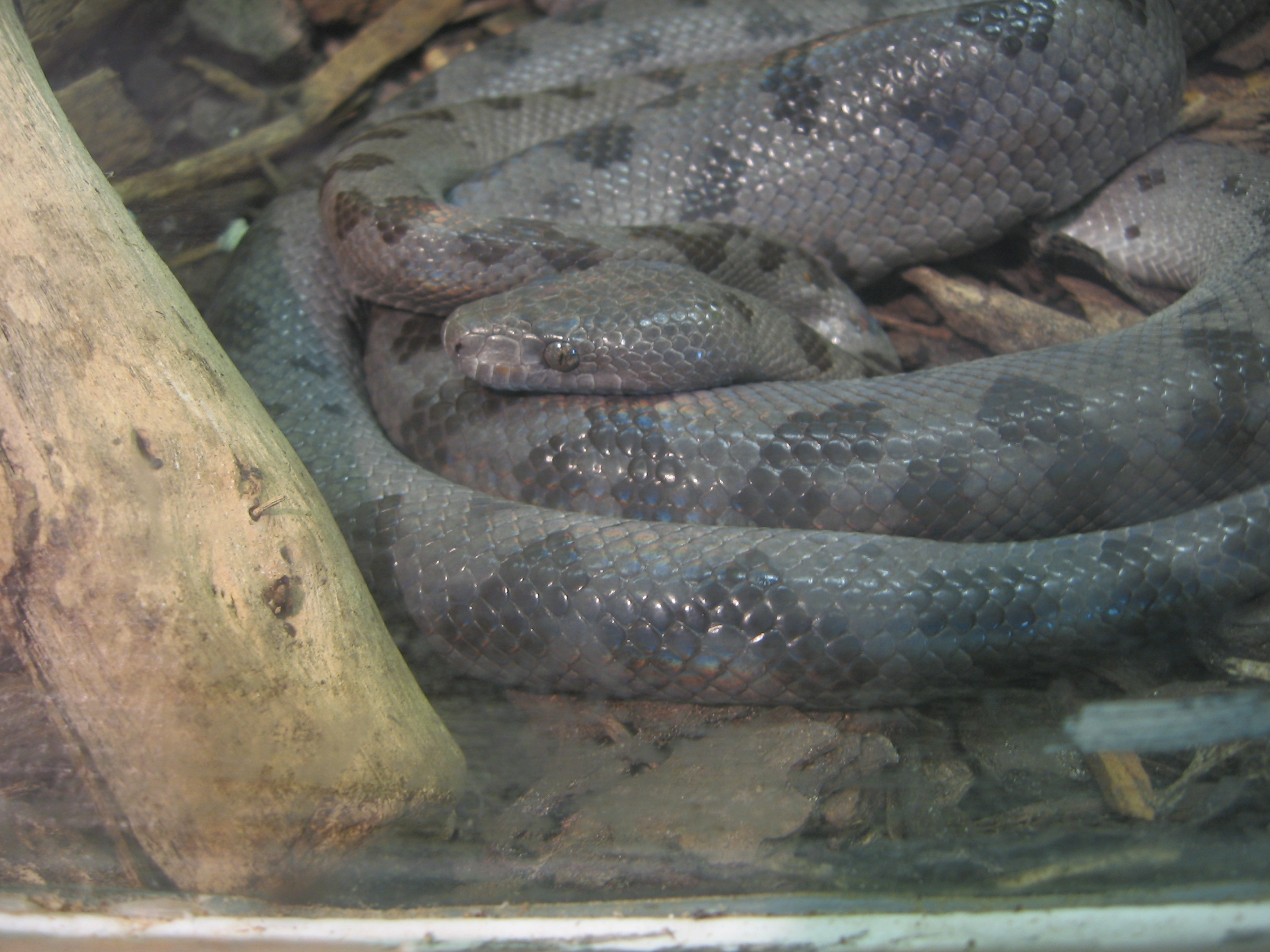

Conservation status
- Vulnerable (IUCN 3.1)

Scientific classification
- Kingdom: Animalia
- Phylum: Chordata
- Order: Squamata
- Suborder: Serpentes
- Family: Boidae
- Genus: Chilabothrus
- Species: C. exsul

Binomial name
- Chilabothrus exsul Netting & Goin, 1944

= Chilabothrus exsul =

Species of snake

Chilabothrus exsul, the Abaco Island boa or Northern Bahamas boa, is a boa species found in the Bahamas. No subspecies are currently recognized. Like all other boas, it is not venomous.

== Description ==
Slender and terrestrial with an iridescent reddish sheen. It grows to a maximum of 80 cm (31 in) in length and feeds on small mammals, birds and lizards.

== Distribution and habitat ==
Found in the Bahamas on Grand Bahama Island and Great Abaco Island, including Elbow Cay and Little Abaco Island. The type locality given is "Near Blackrock (approximately 26°49'N. lat. and 77°25'30"W. long.) on the east coast of Great Abaco in the Bahamas."
