= White-vented bulbul =

White-vented bulbul may refer to various species in the bulbul family of passerine birds:

- Common bulbul (Pycnonotus barbatus), found in Africa
- Light-vented bulbul (Pycnonotus sinensis), found in South-east Asia
