= Conception Island, Bahamas =

Island in the Bahamas

Conception Island
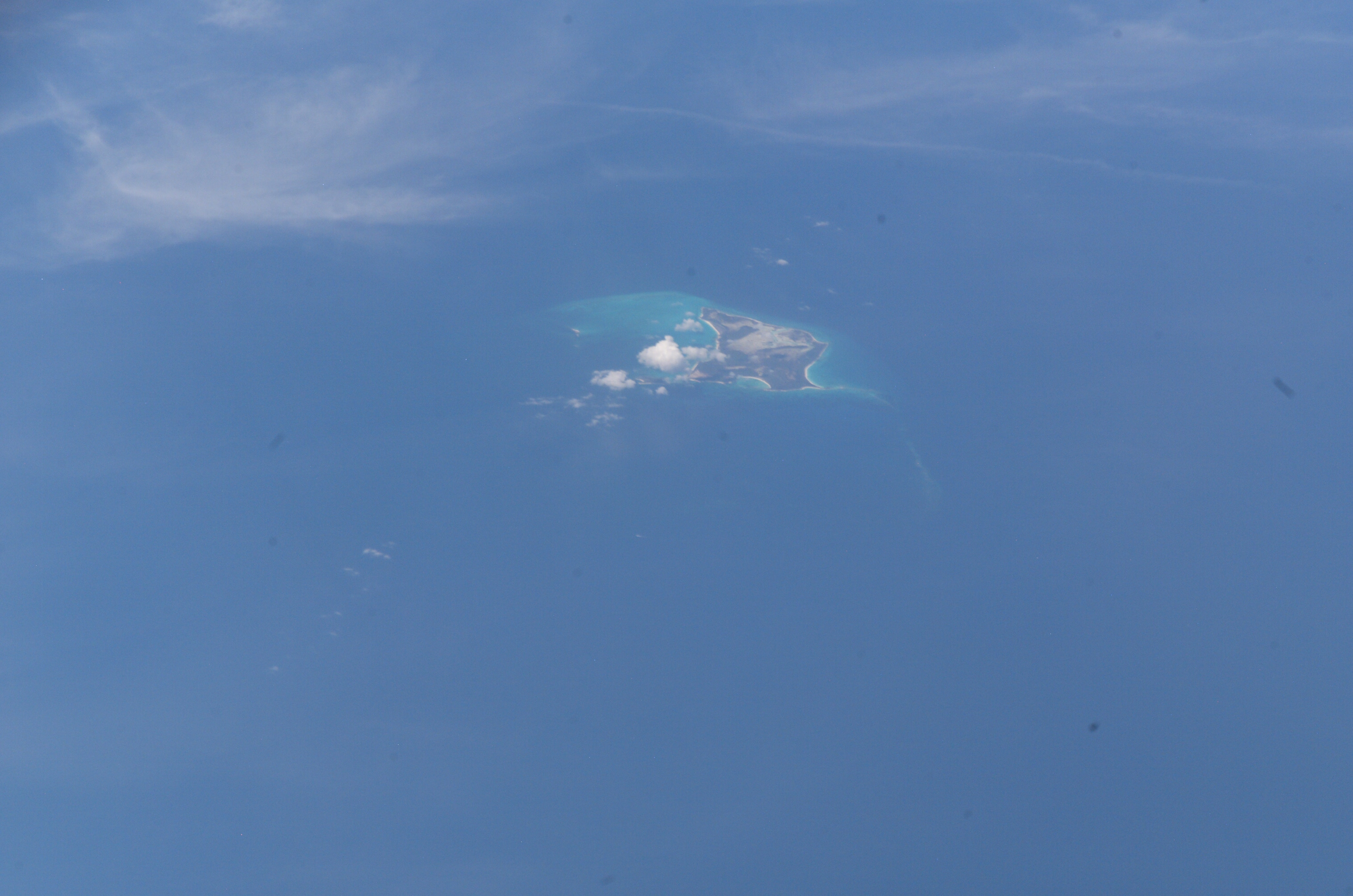
- Conception Island

- Location within Bahamas

Geography
- Location: Atlantic Ocean
- Coordinates: 23.833°N 75.113°W
- Archipelago: Lucayan Archipelago

Administration
- Bahamas

Additional information
- Time zone: EST (UTC-5)
  - Summer (DST): EDT (UTC-4)
- ISO code: BS-RC

Conception Island is an islet located in the Bahamas. It is 7–9 km^{2} (2.7–3.5 sq mi) and reaches 25 m (82 ft) above sea level. It is an important rookery for nesting seabirds and hatching site for green turtles, and is home to the Conception Bank silver boa. It is uninhabited and protected as part of the Conception Island National Park.

== Geography ==
Conception Island is the largest island of Conception Bank, located between Cat Island and Rum Cay. The island is flanked to the northeast by Booby Cay, to the southeast by the South Rocks and is surrounded by various smaller islets that are dotted across the bank.

The island has a salty central bay known as Conception Creek, (Note: Bahamian usage of the word creek differs from the sense in which the word is used to describe a freshwater stream.) and multiple brackish ponds on the northern part of the island.

== Ecology ==
In 2015, a previously unknown species of boa was discovered on the island, and subsequently given the name Conception Bank silver boa (Chilabothrus argentum), the name being a reference to the fact it was first found in a silver palm. The boa is endemic to Conception Bank.

The island, in particular its mangroves and Conception Creek, is a hatching site for green turtles. Exploitation of the island's green turtle population is prohibited by law, but enforcing this protection is difficult, and turtles are occasionally removed from their habitat by visitors to the island.

The island is considered an Important Bird Area, with at least 68 species of bird being known to visit the island and its satellite islets, and out of those Antillean nighthawks, Audubon's shearwaters, brown noddies, bridled terns, royal terns, sooty terns and white-tailed tropicbirds are known to nest in the area.

== History ==
Writers such as Rupert Gould and Steven Mitchell have proposed the theory that Conception might be Guanahani, the island where Christopher Columbus made his first landfall in the Americas on October 12, 1492.

== See also ==
- Geography of the Bahamas

== Sources ==
- Bjorndal, Ka; Bolten, Ab; Chaloupka, My (2003). "Survival probability estimates for immature green turtles Chelonia mydas in the Bahamas". Marine Ecology Progress Series. 252: 273–281. doi:10.3354/meps252273. ISSN 0171-8630.
- R. Graham Reynolds; Sandra D. Buckner (6 February 2023). "Characterization of the bird diversity of Conception Island National Park, The Bahamas". Journal of Caribbean Ornithology. 36: 17–25. doi:10.55431/jco.2023.36.17-25. ISSN 1544-4953.
