= Conception Bank silver boa =

Conservation status
- Critically Endangered (IUCN 3.1)

Scientific classification
- Kingdom: Animalia
- Phylum: Chordata
- Class: Reptilia
- Order: Squamata
- Suborder: Serpentes
- Family: Boidae
- Genus: Chilabothrus
- Species: C. argentum

Binomial name
- Chilabothrus argentum Reynolds et al., 2016

Species of snake

The Conception Bank silver boa (Chilabothrus argentum), also known as the Conception Bank boa or silver boa, is a species of boa described in May 2016 by a team of researchers from Harvard University led by Dr. R. Graham Reynolds. It is only known from the Conception Island Bank in the Bahamas. It is the first known discovery of a West Indian boa species in 73 years. It is named for its unique silver color and the fact that the first specimen was found in a silver palm. It is the most endangered boa in the world, with fewer than 150 individuals in just 5 hectares of habitat. The species is known from six individuals encountered in July 2015 by a research team from Harvard University, and from the type series of two individuals collected in October 2015. A total of 49 individuals have been observed by researchers between 2015 and 2017.

== Description ==
Conception Bank silver boas have silver to tan dorsal background coloration, with or without scattered dark brown scales. Ventral scales are pure cream-white. Juveniles undergo ontogenetic color change, from a light brownish-orange coloration with heavy patterning as neonates to the adult coloration around 400-500 mm snout-vent length. They measure 88–103 cm (35–41 in) in snout–vent length and weigh 182–258 g (6.4–9.1 oz). Tail length varies between 18 and 21 cm (7.1 and 8.3 in). There is one loreal scale, 275–282 ventral scales, 82–91 subcaudal scales,11–12 supralabial scales, and ten circumorbital scales. Males and females do not differ in the shape of their heads, although males might have slightly larger eyes relative to body size.

== Habitat and biology ==
The Conception Bank silver boa is largely arboreal and has been found in silver palm Coccothrinax argentata and gumbo-limbo Bursera simaruba. It is thought that the species mostly feeds on birds, with juveniles possibly feeding on Anolis sagrei lizards.The species is known from six individuals encountered in July 2015 by a research team from Harvard University, and from the type series of two individuals collected in October 2015. A total of 49 individuals have been observed by researchers between 2015 and 2017.

== Conservation ==
The Conception Bank Silver Boa is the world's most endangered boa species, with fewer than 150 adults remaining in an area of less than 5 hectares. It has been assessed by the International Union for Conservation of Nature (IUCN) and is considered "Critically Endangered" in view of its small area of occurrence as well as potential threats posed by introduced species, habitat loss, and (illegal) pet trade. Some level of protection is offered by the Conception Island Bank being designated as a national park, and by the relative remoteness of the islands. However, a daily satellite imagery study between 2016 and 2021 found that several hundred vessels visit Conception Island Bank yearly.

== In popular culture ==
The Conception Bank silver boa is a featured part of the story in T.C. Boyle's novel Blue Skies. The discovery of the Silver Boa and researcher R. Graham Reynolds are featured in the book Bill Nye's Great Big World of Science.

== Media ==
The discovery of the Conception Bank silver boa was featured in global news media outlets, including National Geographic, The Independent, El Mundo, BBC Science Focus, Newsweek, Scientific American, and Atlas Obscura.
