= Great Camanoe =

Island in the British Virgin Islands

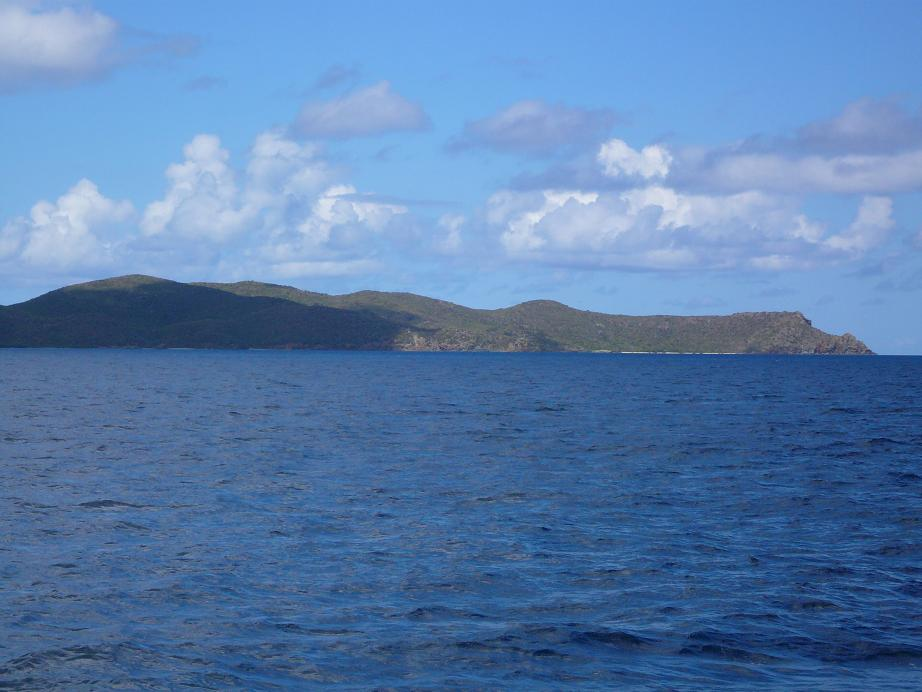
- View of the eastern (uninhabited) side of Great Camanoe, from the east

- The location of Great Camanoe within the British Virgin Islands

- Location within British Virgin Islands Location within the Caribbean

Geography
- Location: Caribbean Sea
- Coordinates: 18°28′30″N 64°31′55″W
- Archipelago: Virgin Islands

Administration
- United Kingdom
- British Overseas Territory: British Virgin Islands

Demographics
- Population: 6 (2010)

Additional information
- Time zone: AST (UTC-4)
- ISO code: VG

Great Camanoe /ˈkɑːmənoʊ/ is a small island just north of Beef Island and northeast of Tortola in the British Virgin Islands, a group of islands that forms part of the archipelago of the Virgin Islands, in the Atlantic Ocean and Caribbean Sea.

Great Camanoe is primarily a residential island, divided into two communities, Indigo Plantation and The Privateers, on the southern half of the island. Access to the island is by boat only. Visitors often anchor at Lee Bay or Cam Bay, a national park and good snorkeling site.

== History and name ==
A 1793 Spanish map of the Virgin Islands refers to Great Camanoe island as Cayman Grande and Little Camanoe island as Caiman Chico. These names are obvious references to American crocodiles (cayman or caiman) which inhabited the area when the islands were first explored by Christopher Columbus and to this day are still found on Cuba, Hispaniola and other Caribbean locations. In Columbus' native tongue, Italian, the word cayman is spelled caimano.
