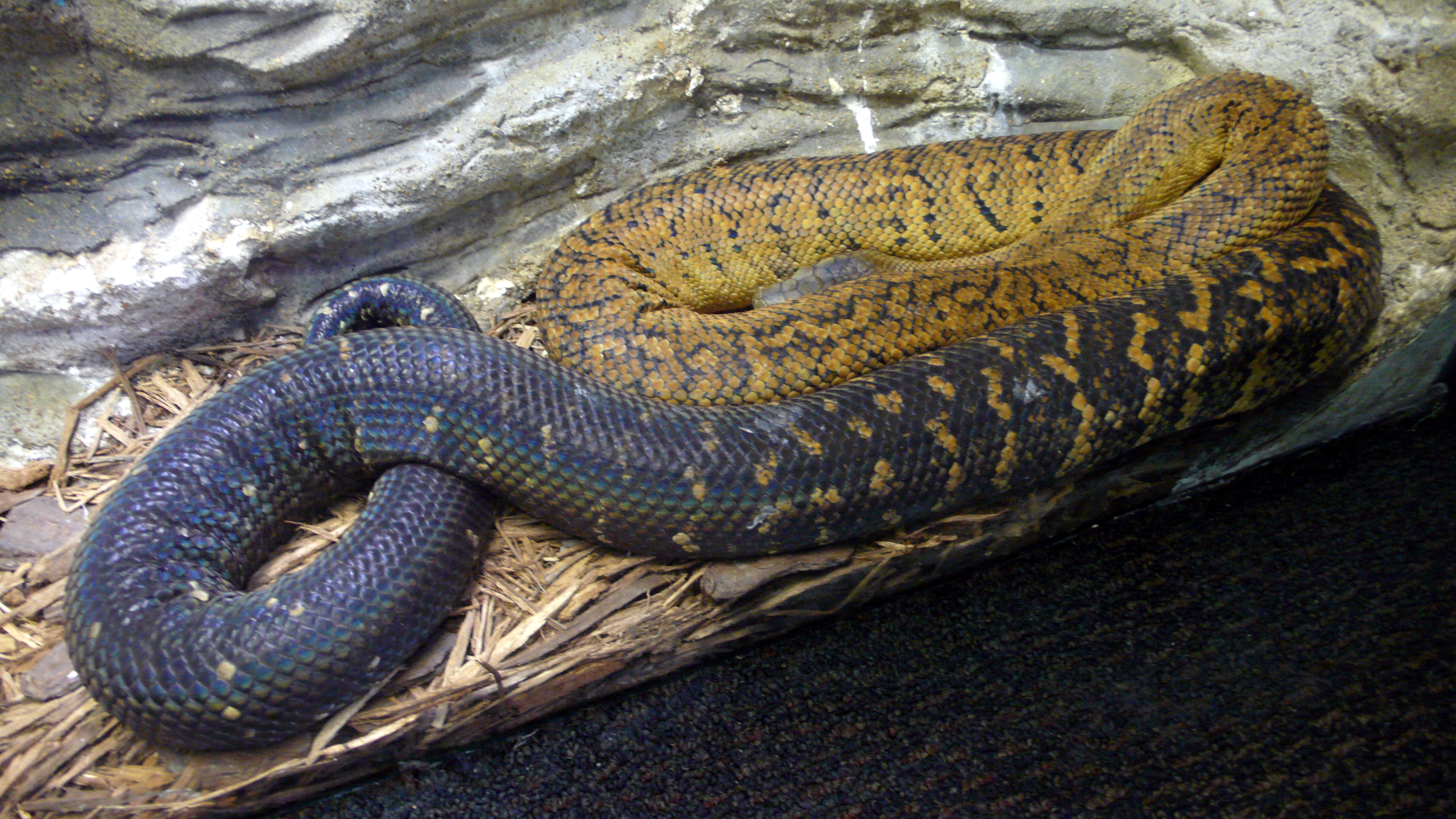
- Chilabothrus subflavus

Conservation status
- Vulnerable (IUCN 3.1)

Scientific classification
- Kingdom: Animalia
- Phylum: Chordata
- Class: Reptilia
- Order: Squamata
- Suborder: Serpentes
- Family: Boidae
- Genus: Chilabothrus
- Species: C. subflavus

Binomial name
- Chilabothrus subflavus Stejneger, 1901
- The range of the Jamaican Boa

= Jamaican boa =

Species of snake

The Jamaican boa, Jamaican yellow boa, yellow snake or Jamaican green snake (Chilabothrus subflavus); in Jamaican Patois: nanka) is a boa species endemic to Jamaica. No subspecies are recognized. Like all other boas, it is not venomous.

== Description ==
The Jamaican boa is golden-green around the head and along the anterior section of the body, with black zigzag crossbars, becoming black toward the posterior end of its body. The snake's body is quite long, up to 2 metres (6 feet 7 inches) in total length.

== Behavior ==
The Jamaican boa is primarily nocturnal and arboreal. The species may also display crepuscular activity, influenced by factors such as environmental conditions, prey availability, and seasonal activities. During daytime, this species seeks shelter in various locations such as epiphytes, trees, rock crevices, termite nests, or caves. It has been observed at the far end of Portland Cave. This species is also known to bask on rocks following heavy rains and to rest on roads and trails during the evening, suggesting crepuscular behavior under certain conditions.

== Distribution and habitat ==
Found in Jamaica in the Cockpit Country, historically once prevalent throughout much of Jamaica, notably in rural areas, as well as some smaller adjacent islands, such as Goat Islands. However, after the introduction of the small Indian mongoose (Herpestes auropunctatus) in 1872, sightings of the snake on the mainland dropped. The snake is known to be elusive, which further complicates its detection.

Recent surveys have failed to confirm the snake's presence on Great Goat Island, an area dominated by dry limestone forest. Comprehensive island-wide surveys have been conducted, indicating the snake's presence in various parishes such as Trelawny, St. Anne, Westmoreland, and Hanover.

The Jamaican boa is now confined to approximately 1,000.6 km^{2}, about 9% of Jamaica's land area. Habitat fragmentation and human activities have localized and severely fragmented the population. Major strongholds for the boa now appear to be Cockpit Country, Blue Mountains, Yallah Mountains, Hellshire Hills, and Portland Bight, which together account for 93% of the known habitat of the species.

== Foraging and diet ==
The foraging behavior of the Jamaican boa is not extensively studied, but the species is known to be an ecological generalist. It employs constriction to subdue and consume a diverse range of prey. The snake utilizes both active and ambush foraging strategies, which vary depending on the habitat structure, available food resources, and its life stage. For instance, it has been observed hanging from branches and vines to prey on emerging bats in the evening.

Birds, particularly black-billed parrots (Amazona agilis) and yellow-billed parrots (Amazona collaria), are significant prey items for the Jamaican boa. This species is also a leading cause of nest failure for these endemic bird species, particularly in forest edge habitats. Invasive cane toads (Rhinella marina) are also preyed upon, although their toxins can be fatal to the snake. This species will occasionally enter human dwellings and agricultural areas to hunt for rats and chickens. In captivity, the diet often consists of rats for juveniles and adults, while neonates are typically fed chicks or pre-killed, frozen house mice. These mice are often treated with scents from chicks, lizards, or frogs to stimulate consumption.

== Ecological niche ==
The Jamaican boa is considered a top predator in its ecosystem. It engages in both active and ambush predation, often using vines and tank bromeliads (Aechmea paniculigera) for mobility and camouflage. Observations indicate that the species actively preys on flycatcher nests (Tyrannidae). It has also been identified as a predator of Black-billed amazons (Amazona agilis) and Yellow-billed amazons (A. collaria) in Cockpit Country, Jamaica.

While there is no published data on the species' relative abundance in Jamaica, research suggests that Black-Billed Parrots experience higher rates of nest predation in ecotones compared to forest habitats. This may indicate a correlation between the foraging ecology of the Jamaican boa and edge habitats in Cockpit Country.

Limited information is available on the foraging behavior of the Jamaican boa inside cave systems. Aggressive interactions between male individuals of this species have only been documented in captivity. Additionally, increased levels of aggression from females toward conspecifics have been observed under specific conditions.

== Conservation status ==
The Jamaican boa's natural populations greatly and constantly declined since the late 19th century, mainly because of predation by introduced species (such as mongooses), human persecution, and habitat destruction. In-situ conservation of the Jamaican boa is seriously hindered by the lack of information on demographic and ecological parameters as well as by a poor understanding of the population structure and species distribution in the wild. This species is classified as Vulnerable (VU) on the IUCN Red List of Threatened Species with the following criteria: A2ce (v2.3, 1994). A species is listed as such when the best available evidence indicates that a population decline of 20% is expected within the next ten years or three generations, whichever is the longer, due to a decline in the quality and area of occupancy. It is therefore considered to be facing a high risk of extinction in the wild. Year assessed: 1996.

Their natural habitat is being destroyed, which is forcing them into inhabited areas, where they are captured and killed. Some measures have been taken to afford these animals some protection:

- Listed as a Protected Species under the Wild Life Protection Act (1945).
- Listed on Appendix I of CITES.
- Hunting in forest reserves is also prohibited under the Forest Act (1996).
