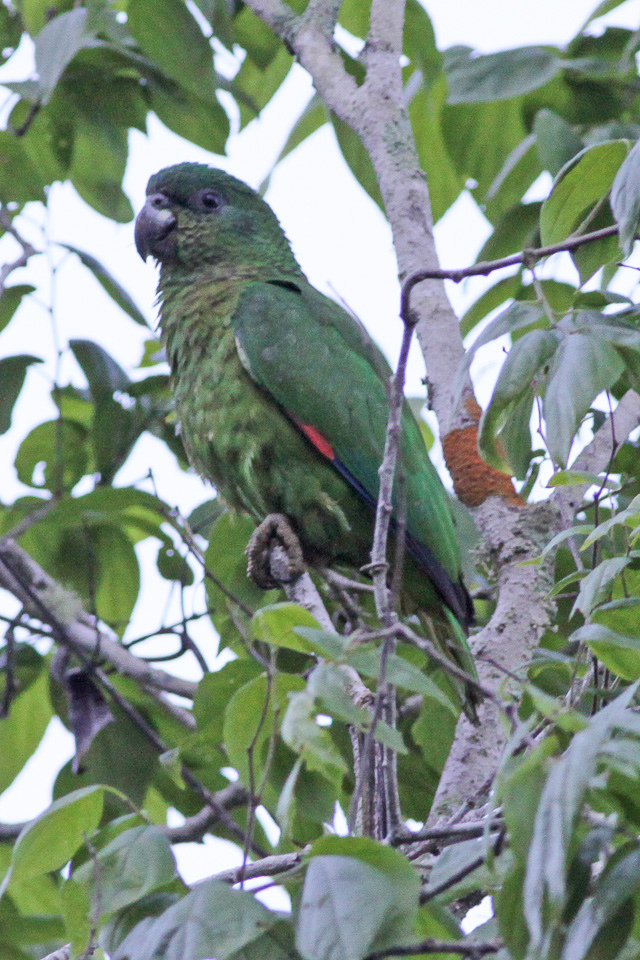
- In Cockpit Country, Jamaica

Conservation status
- Endangered (IUCN 3.1)

Scientific classification
- Kingdom: Animalia
- Phylum: Chordata
- Class: Aves
- Order: Psittaciformes
- Family: Psittacidae
- Genus: Amazona
- Species: A. agilis

Binomial name
- Amazona agilis (Linnaeus, 1758)

Synonyms
- Psittacus agilis Linnaeus, 1758

= Black-billed amazon =

Species of bird

The black-billed amazon (Amazona agilis) is a parrot endemic to Jamaica. Sometimes called the black-billed parrot, this amazon parrot is mostly green with small patches of red on the wing and sometimes flecked on the head. Its bill makes it easy to separate from most other amazons, including the yellow-billed amazon, which also lives in Jamaica. It is the smallest Amazona parrot at 25 cm (10 in).

== Taxonomy ==
In 1751 the English naturalist George Edwards included an illustration and a description of the black-billed amazon in the fourth volume of his A Natural History of Uncommon Birds. He used the English name "The little green parrot". Edwards based his hand-coloured etching on a live bird that he had bought from a dealer in London. He was uncertain of the origin but assumed that it had come from the West Indies. When in 1758 the Swedish naturalist Carl Linnaeus updated his Systema Naturae for the tenth edition, he placed the black-billed amazon with the other parrots in the genus Psittacus. Linnaeus included a brief description, coined the binomial name Psittacus agilis and cited Edwards' work. The black-billed amazon is now one of 33 parrots placed in the genus Amazona that was introduced by the French naturalist René Lesson in 1830. The genus name is a Latinized version of the name Amazone given to them in the 18th century by the Comte de Buffon, who believed they were native to Amazonian jungles. The specific epithet agilis is Latin meaning "nimble" or "active". The species is monotypic: no subspecies are recognised.

== Description ==
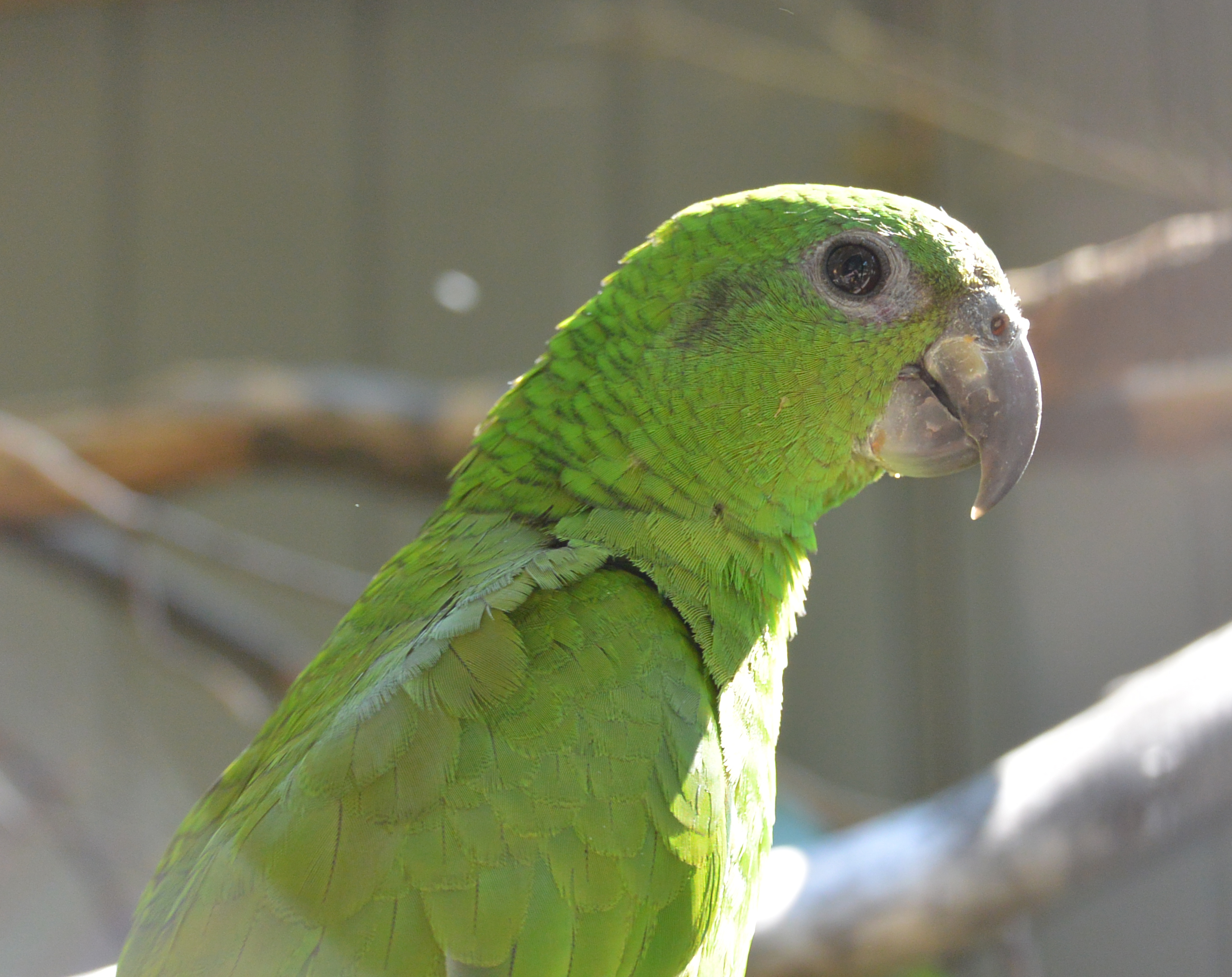
At Vienna Zoo, Austria

This parrot is smaller than the yellow-billed amazon and measures between 10.5 and 11.5 inches (27 and 29 centimetres). In males, the bill is very dark grey, almost black, becoming paler towards the base. The cere is very dark grey, as is the skin around the eyes, and the iris is dark brown. This bird's plumage is predominantly green, paler and more yellowish on the underparts. The feathers of the neck are edged with dusky black. Ear-coverts are blackish and primary coverts are red. Primaries are violet-blue and black, secondaries are blue at the tips, becoming green towards the base. The tail is mostly green and lateral feathers are marked with red, while outer feathers are margined with blue. The feet are greyish-green. Females are similar to males but with some primary coverts green instead of red.

The black-billed amazon's call is bugling while in flight however, while perched it growls and rumbles. Often its calls tend to be sharp and screechy.

== Distribution and habitat ==
The black-billed amazon is endemic to Jamaica. They live in mountainous rainforest, usually limestone rainforest, feeding on fruit, seeds, and nuts, and will take cultivated fruit like mangos, papayas and cucumbers as well as wild fruits.

== Threats ==
The black-billed amazon was once as common as the yellow-billed amazon, but has become much rarer due to deforestation and hurricane damage fragmenting its forest, poaching for food and the pet trade in wild parrots.
