= Turbit =

Breed of pigeon

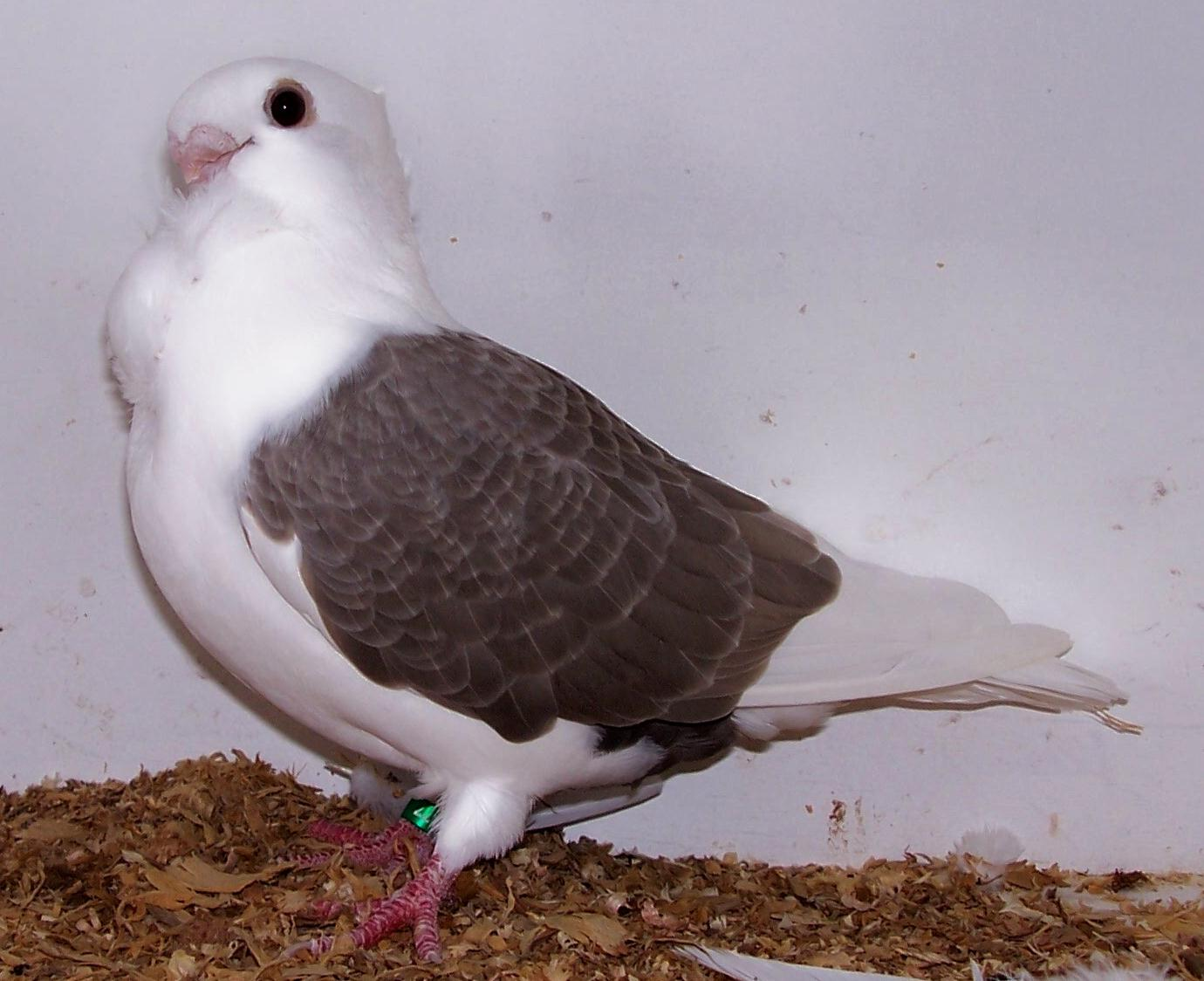
- black
- Conservation status: Common
- Standard: yes
- Type: Show
- Use: Show

Traits
- Crest type: peak
- Feather ornamentation: Jabot
- Color: black, blue, yellow, red, brown
- Lifespan: 12 years
- head: elongated
- marking: shield
- eye color: bull

Classification
- Australian: Owls Group 3
- European: Owls
- US: Owls and Frills

The Turbit is a breed of fancy pigeon developed over many years of selective breeding. Turbits, along with other varieties of domesticated pigeons, are all descendants from the rock pigeon (Columba livia). The breed is known for its peaked crest, short beak and frill of feathers on its breast.

== Gallery ==
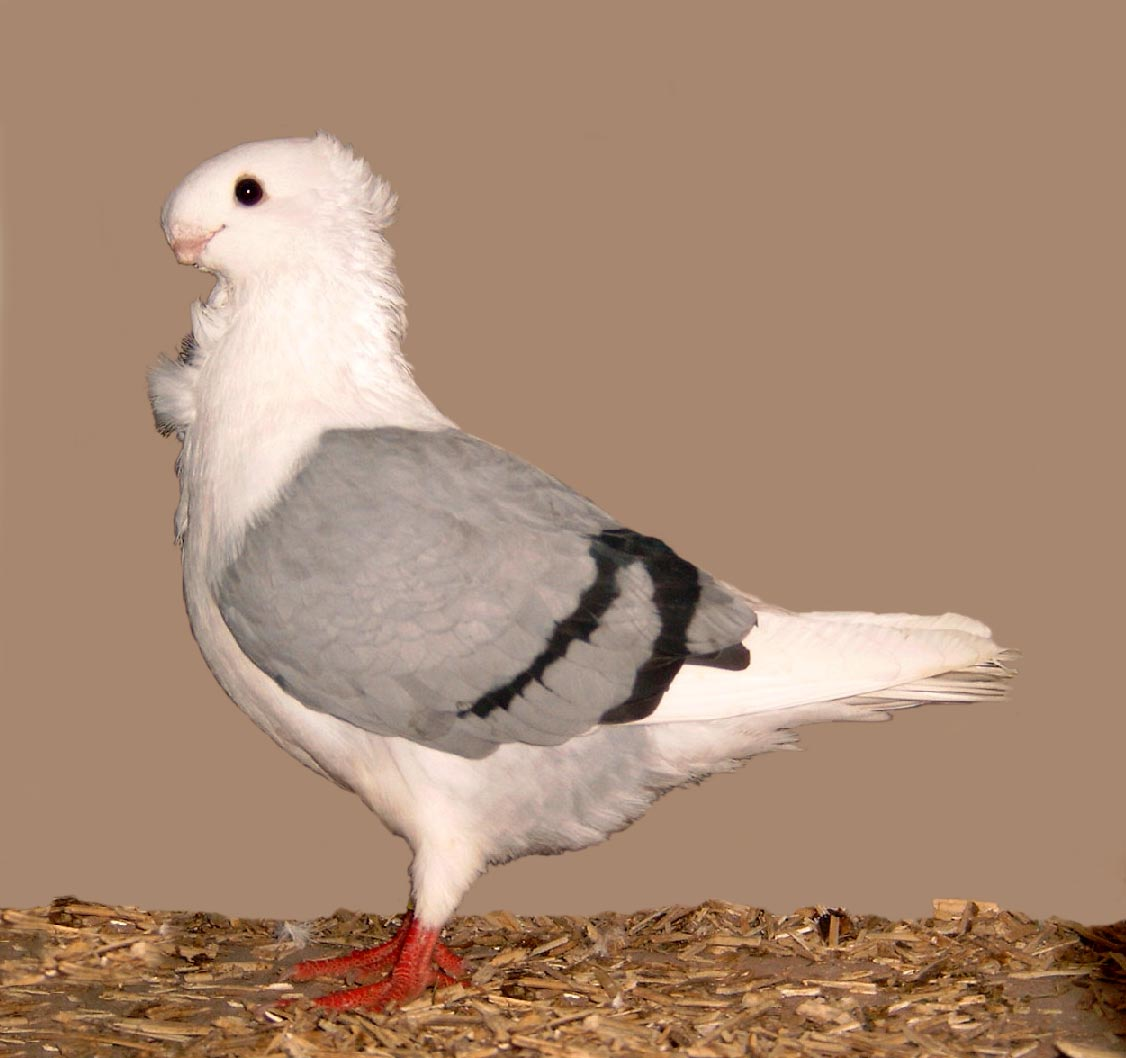
Blue bar

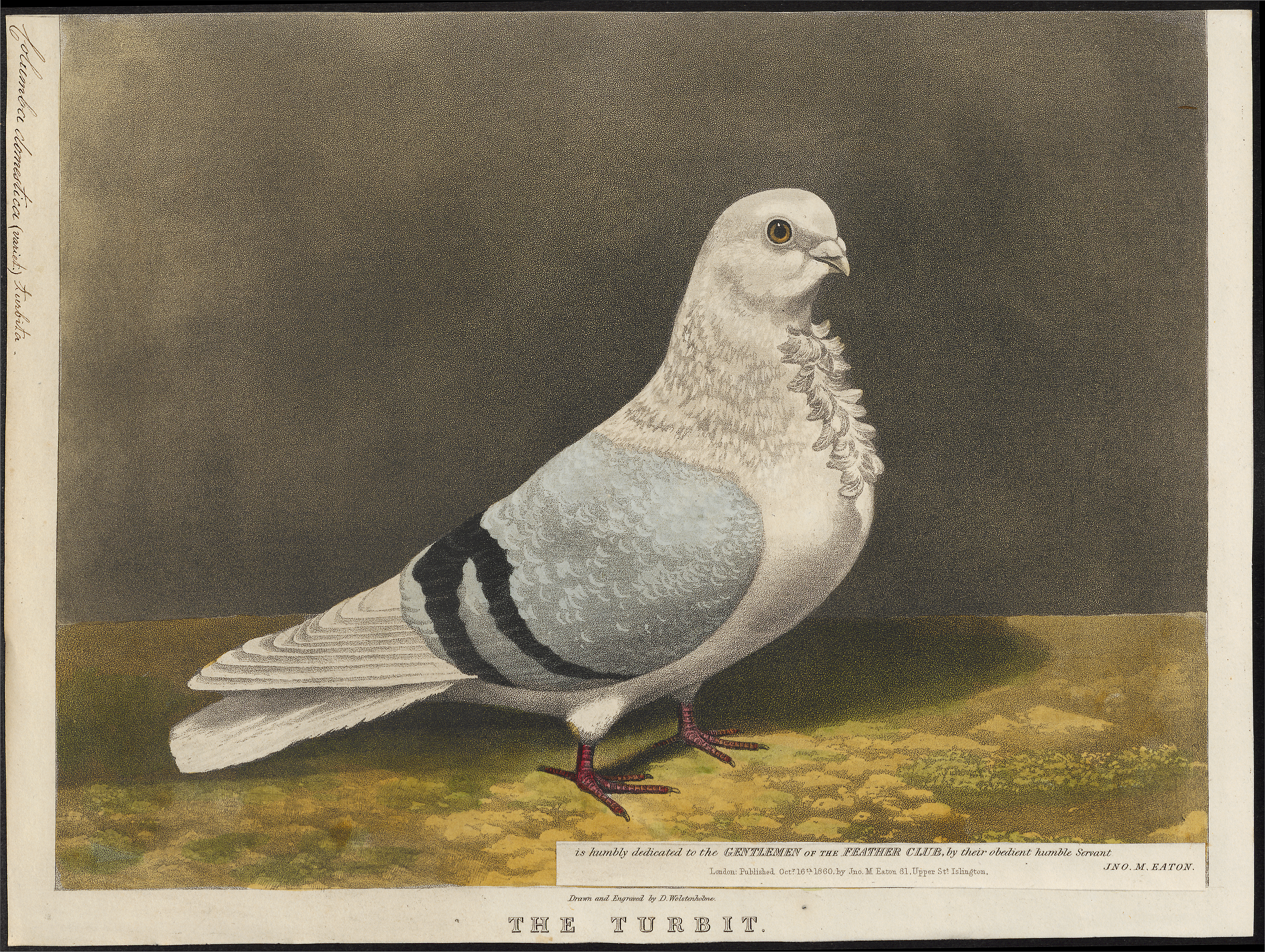
Columba domestica var. turbita 1860

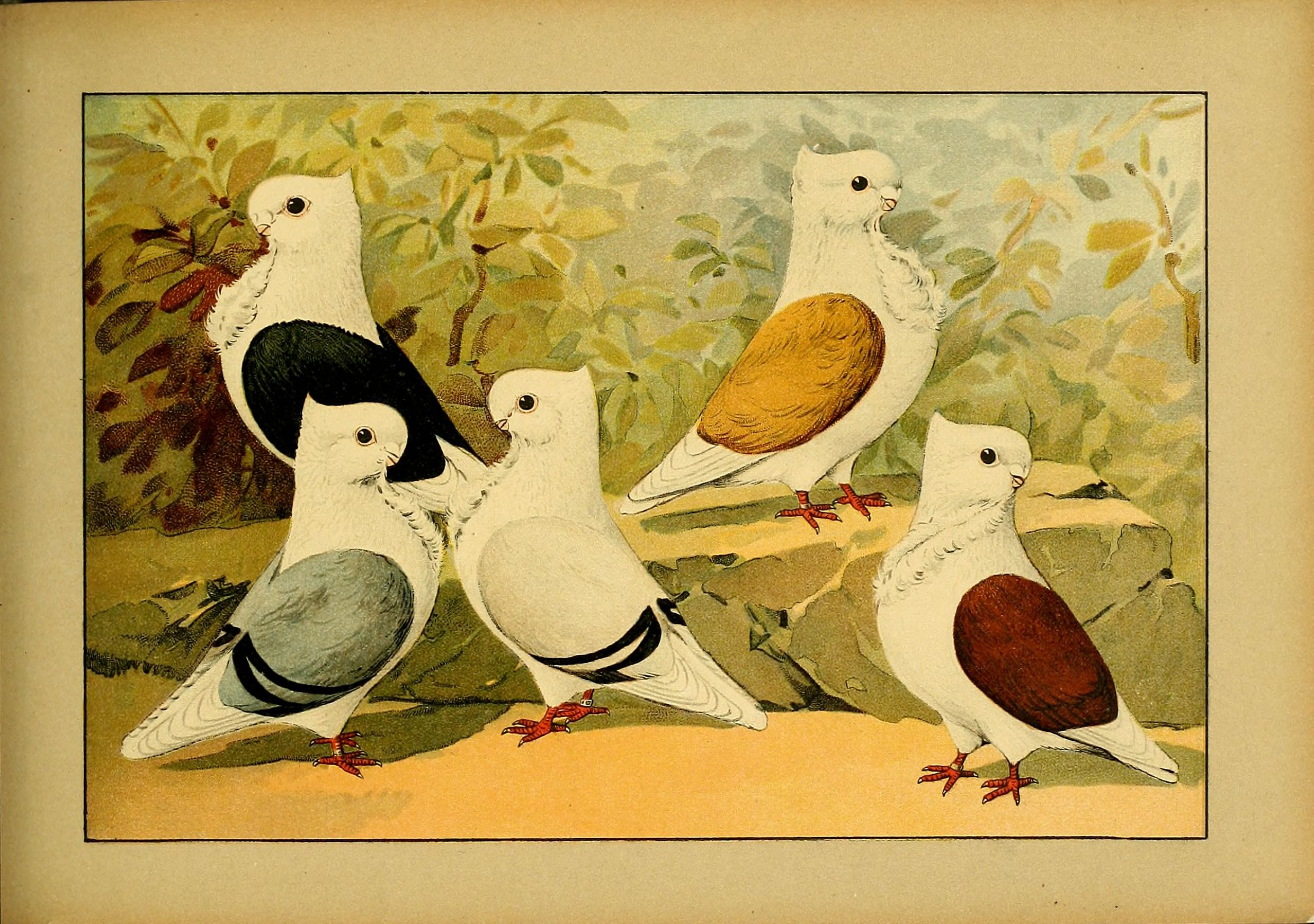
Schachtzabel 1906 Tafel 70

== See also ==
- Pigeon Diet
- Pigeon Housing
- List of pigeon breeds
