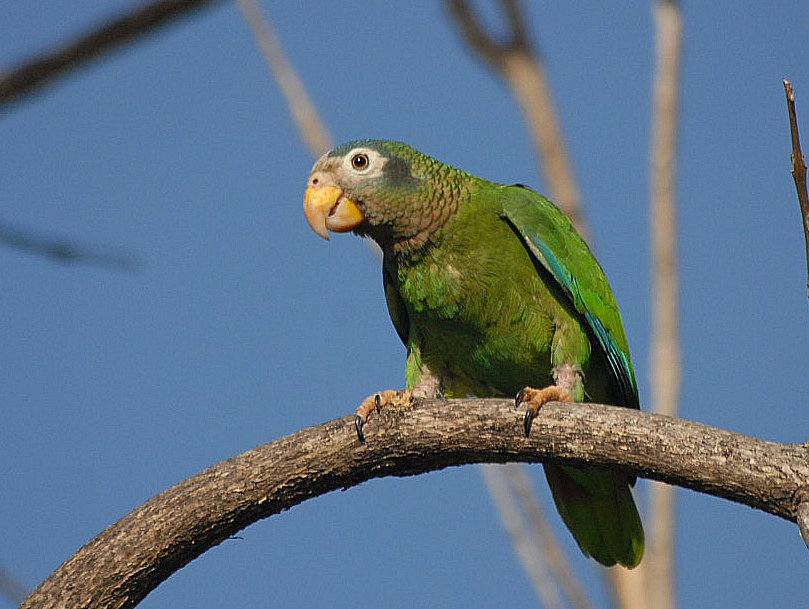
- At St. Andrew, Jamaica

Conservation status
- Vulnerable (IUCN 3.1)

Scientific classification
- Kingdom: Animalia
- Phylum: Chordata
- Class: Aves
- Order: Psittaciformes
- Family: Psittacidae
- Genus: Amazona
- Species: A. collaria

Binomial name
- Amazona collaria (Linnaeus, 1758)

Synonyms
- Psittacus collarius Linnaeus, 1758

= Yellow-billed amazon =

Species of bird

The yellow-billed amazon (Amazona collaria), also called the yellow-billed parrot or Jamaican amazon, is a species of parrot in the family Psittacidae. It is a predominantly green parrot with a short tail and pink throat and neck. It is endemic to Jamaica, where its natural habitats are subtropical or tropical moist lowland forests, subtropical or tropical mangrove forests, subtropical or tropical moist montane forests, plantations, and rural gardens. It is threatened by habitat loss and illegal trapping of wild birds for the pet trade.

The yellow-billed amazon was one of the many species originally described by Carl Linnaeus in his landmark 1758 10th edition of Systema Naturae.

== Taxonomy ==
The yellow-billed was formally described in 1758 by the Swedish naturalist Carl Linnaeus in the tenth edition of his Systema Naturae. He placed it with all the other parrots in the genus Psittacus and coined the binomial name Psittacus collarius. Linnaeus based his description on an account by the Irish naturalist and collector Hans Sloane that was published in 1725 in his The Natural History of Jamaica. Sloan reported that the parrots "are eaten bak'd in pyes and taste as pigeons." Linnaeus mistaken specified the type location as "America" instead of Jamaica. The yellow-billed amazon is now one of around thirty species placed in the genus Amazona that was introduced by the French naturalist René Lesson in 1830. The genus name is a Latinized version of the name Amazone used in the 18th century by the Comte de Buffon. The specific epithet collaria, collarius is from Latin collare and means collar or neck-chain. The species is monotypic: no subspecies are recognised.

== Description ==
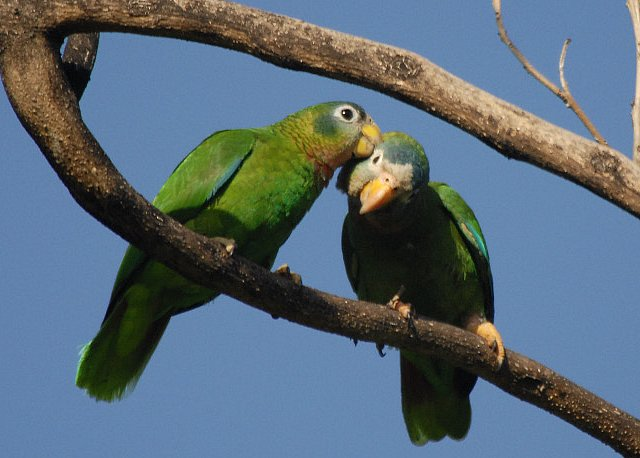
Two at St Andrew, Jamaica

The yellow-billed amazon is 28 cm (11 in) long. Its plumage is mostly green with pink over the throat, upper breast and sides of neck, and blue in the larger wing feathers. Feathers over the ears are dark blue-green. The bare white eye-rings are surrounded by a narrow rim of white plumage, which continues as a narrow band of white over the forehead. Plumage over the lores is pale blue and the fore-crown is blue. A barred appearance over the back and sides of neck arises from the green feathers having black tips and edges. The tail feathers are green with red bases. Its beak is yellow, its irises are brown, and its legs are pink. The adult male and female are identical in external appearance. Juveniles have grey on the upper mandible and are otherwise similar to adults.

== Distribution and habitat ==
The yellow-billed amazon is found up to 1200m on the island of Jamaica where it is more abundant in the John Crow Mountains, on Mount Diablo and in the Cockpit Country. In the breeding season it stays within rainforest.

== Status ==
The yellow-billed amazon is classified as vulnerable by the International Union for Conservation of Nature (IUCN). They are a protected species being listed on appendix II of CITES, which makes trade and export of trapped wild birds illegal. Its populations are fragmented and it has a small range. It is threatened by habitat loss, illegal trapping for the pet trade, and felling of trees with suitable nesting cavities. They are also threatened by potential hybridization with non-endemic pet amazon parrots, which occasionally escape particularly during the hurricane season.

== Cited texts ==
- Forshaw, Joseph M. (2006). Parrots of the World; an Identification Guide. Illustrated by Frank Knight. Princeton University Press. ISBN 0-691-09251-6.
- Linnaeus, Carl (1758). Systema naturae per regna tria naturae:secundum classes, ordines, genera, species, cum characteribus, differentiis, synonymis, locis (in Latin) (10th ed.). Holmiae (Laurentii Salvii).
