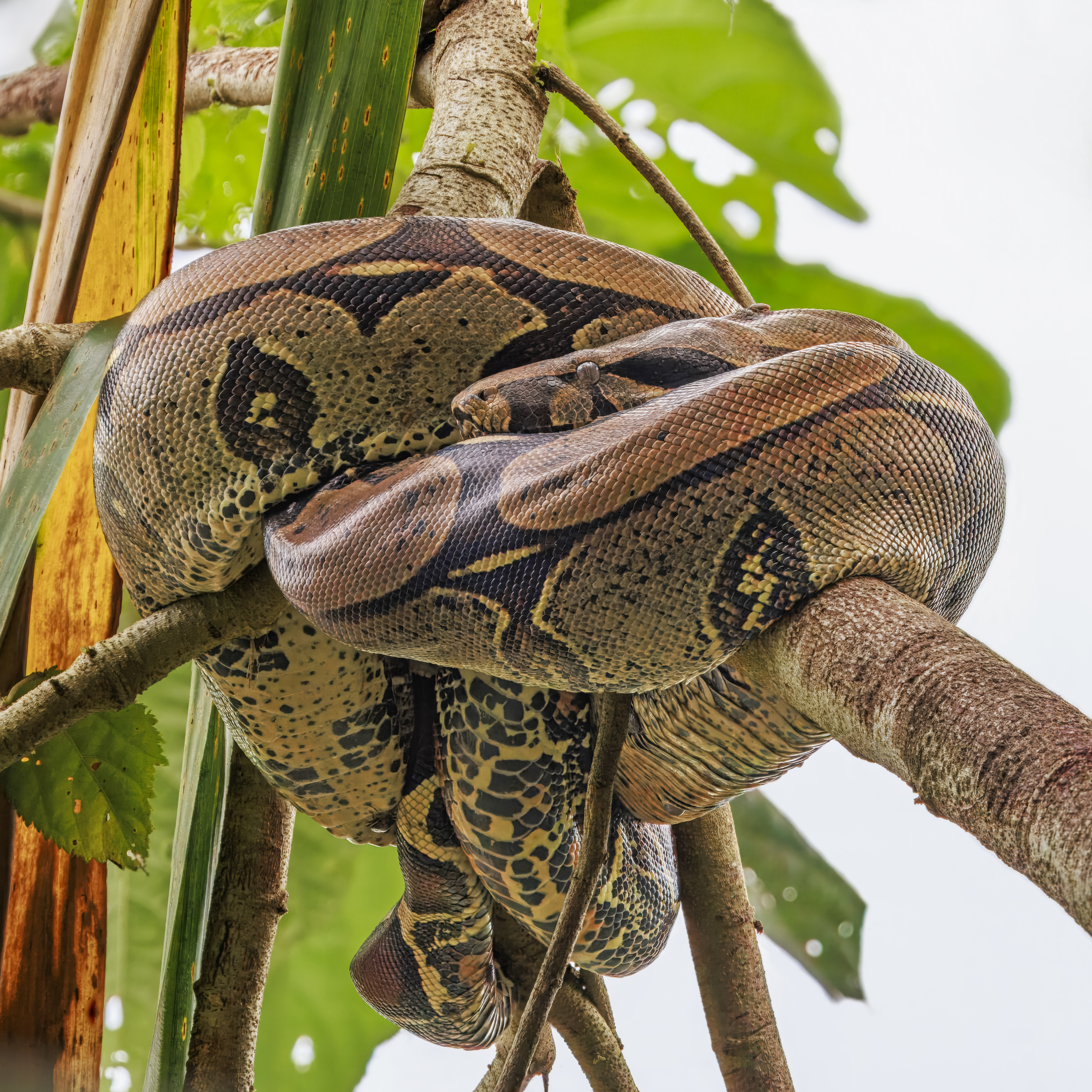
- Boa constrictor (Boa constrictor)

Scientific classification
- Kingdom: Animalia
- Phylum: Chordata
- Class: Reptilia
- Order: Squamata
- Suborder: Serpentes
- Family: Boidae
- Subfamily: Boinae; Gray, 1825
- Boinae distribution

Synonyms
- Boina - Gray, 1825; Aproterodontes - A.M.C. Duméril & Bibron, 1844; Boaeides - A.M.C. Duméril & Bibron, 1844; Boinae - Boulenger, 1890

= Boinae =

Boinae Temporal range: Paleocene to recent

Subfamily of snakes

The Boinae are a purported subfamily of boas found in Central and South America, as well as the West Indies. In the Integrated Taxonomic Information System (ITIS), Boinae is considered an invalid synonym of Boidae.

== Genera ==
Subfamily Boinae -- 5 genera
| Genus | Taxon author | Species | Subsp.* | Common name | Geographic range |
| †Bavarioboa | Szyndlar and Schleich, 1993 | 1 | 0 | Asian boas | Europe and Asia, no specific date is known for the formation, biocorelation L.Oligcente to E. Miocene |
| Boa^{T} | Linnaeus, 1758 | 5 | 4 | red-tailed boas | Mexico, Central America and South America |
| Chilabothrus | Duméril & Bibron, 1844 | 14 | 4 | West Indian boas or Greater Antillean boas | the West Indies |
| Corallus | Daudin, 1803 | 9 | 1 | neotropical tree boas | Central America, South America and the West Indies: in Central America, they occur in Honduras, eastern Guatemala through Nicaragua, Costa Rica, and Panama. Their range in South America includes Pacific Colombia and Ecuador, as well as the Amazon Basin from Colombia, Ecuador, Peru and northern Bolivia through Brazil to Venezuela, Isla Margarita, Trinidad and Tobago, Guyana, Suriname, and French Guiana. In the West Indies, they are found on St. Vincent, the Grenadines (Bequia Island, Ile Quatre, Baliceaux, Mustique, Canouan, Maryeau, Union Island, Petit Martinique and Carriacou), Grenada, and the Windward Islands (the Lesser Antilles). |
| Epicrates | Wagler, 1830 | 5 | 4 | rainbow boas | Lower Central America through South America as far south as Argentina |
| Eunectes | Wagler, 1830 | 4 | 0 | anacondas | tropical South America from Colombia and Venezuela south to Argentina |
| †Titanoboa | Head et al., 2009 | 1 | 0 | n/a | Fossils of 28 individuals were found in the Cerrejón Formation in Colombia, dating back to the Paleocene Epoch of the Paleogene Period, 60-58 mya. |

- ) Not including the nominate subspecies.

^{T}) Type genus.

== Taxonomy ==
The genera Acrantophis and Sanzinia were erroneously synonymized with the genus Boa by Kluge in 1991. These have now been transferred to the resurrected subfamily Sanziniinae. The genus Candoia has similarly been transferred to its own subfamily, Candoiinae.

== See also ==
- List of boine species and subspecies
