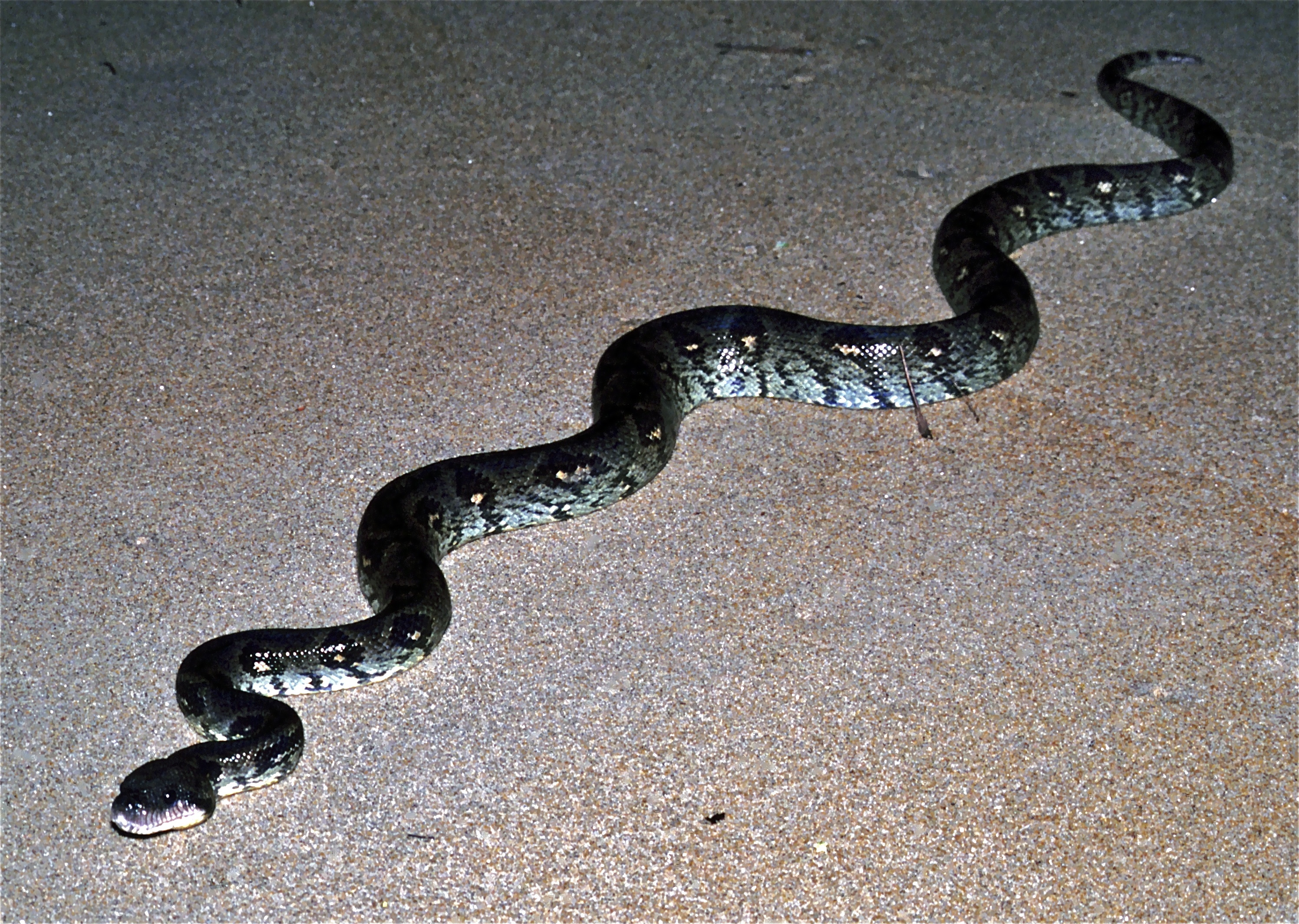
- Madagascar ground boa (Acrantophis madagascariensis)

Scientific classification
- Kingdom: Animalia
- Phylum: Chordata
- Class: Reptilia
- Order: Squamata
- Suborder: Serpentes
- Family: Boidae
- Subfamily: Sanziniinae; Romer, 1956

Genera
- Two genera, see text

= Sanziniinae =

Subfamily of snakes

The Sanziniinae are a subfamily of boid snakes containing four species endemic to the island of Madagascar. Common names include Madagascar boas and Malagasy boas.

== Taxonomy ==
This subfamily contains two genera, each one with two species:

- Acrantophis - Jan, 1860

Acrantophis dumerili, Duméril's boa
Acrantophis madagascariensis, Madagascar ground boa or Malagasy ground boa

- Sanzinia - Gray, 1849

Sanzinia madagascariensis, Madagascar tree boa or Malagasy tree boa
Sanzinia volontany, Nosy Komba ground boa
