= Lemur Street =

- Logo for Lemur Street
- Also known as: Lemur Wars (Australia); Lemur Kingdom (US)
- Genre: Nature, documentary, drama
- Narrated by: Martin Shaw (UK); Franklin O'Smith (US)
- Countries of origin: United Kingdom; United States
- Original language: English
- No. of series: 1
- No. of episodes: 20

Production
- Producer: Joanne Lunt
- Production location: Madagascar
- Cinematography: Robin Smith
- Running time: 30 minutes

Original release
- Network: Animal Planet International
- Release: 20 November 2007 – 4 February 2008

Lemur Street is a television show produced by Oxford Scientific Films for Animal Planet International which is based on the successful format of Meerkat Manor. The series premièred in the United Kingdom on 20 November 2007 on the UK Animal Planet network with Martin Shaw narrating.

On 8 February 2008, it aired in the United States under the name Lemur Kingdom, with fourteen episodes airing until 9 May 2008. It was removed from the air with the return of the channel's top series, Meerkat Manor.

Lemur Street was released in a three disc DVD set in the United Kingdom in September 2008 by Eureka Entertainment.

== Production ==
The twenty-episode series focusses on two competing matriarchal ring-tailed lemur troops in the Berenty Reserve on the island of Madagascar. Along with following the lemurs' battles for dominance, against their natural enemies and against each other, the series is reported to include the first professionally recorded footage of a ring-tailed lemur giving birth.

Robin Smith, who filmed several series of Meerkat Manor, is the cinematographer for Lemur Street.

=== International variations ===
The content of the UK and US versions of the programme are the same for most episodes, however Animal Planet US renamed the show Lemur Kingdom, added names for the episodes - which were referred to by number in the UK - and renamed the lemur troops and some individual lemurs. The troop called The Tornadoes in Lemur Street have been renamed "The Furies". Furies was chosen by Animal Planet US because of the constant infighting between the three families which make up the troop. Crystal, the dominant female of the Graveyards, has been renamed Juno and her mate Blake was renamed Marcus.

== Episode listing ==
No.	Title	Original release date	U.S. air date
1	"Episode 1" "Little Lost Lemur"	20 November 2007	8 February 2008
The Tornadoes invade the Graveyards' territory to steal some of their cactus. After a short battle, the Graveyards manage to chase them off. Exhausted after the raid, Crystal leads the group to the forest to find food. The elderly Peg Leg can't keep up and returns to the troop's favourite tree. They are able to enjoy some underground flowers after chasing off more aggressive brown lemurs. Meanwhile, the Tornadoes go to the tourist camp to steal food from the houses and cars. The arrival of a thunderstorm traps the Graveyards where they found the flowers, while the Tornadoes are forced to spend the night in the tourist camp and Peg Leg must spend the cold night alone. In the morning, Crystal leads the Graveyards back to their home base, enjoying a banquet of fruit which fell from the trees during the storm. The Tornadoes use grooming to dry off, but first time mother Amazon doesn't groom her five-month-old son Gizmo.
2	"Episode 2" "Unfortunate Son"	20 November 2007	8 February 2008
Peg Leg tracks down the Graveyards and joins in the feast. In the afternoon, Gizmo is attacked by Chelsea, the daughter of former queen Stella. During the attack, Gizmo falls from a tree and injures his leg. When the group moves on, his mother refuses to carry him and, unable to keep up, he is left behind. As he rests his leg, a Madagascar ground boa comes after him, but a group of sifaka lemurs comes to his aid by distracting the snake. Gizmo hobbles home and painfully makes his way up the Tornadoes' sleeping tree. In the morning, he continues struggling as he forces himself to climb down to follow the troop, then has to climb another tree in order to eat. Exhausted from his efforts, he is abandoned as the rest of the troop goes home. The Graveyards enter the Tornadoes' territory and steal some cactus. On the way back to their home territory, they run into the Tornadoes at a watering hole and must fight to get past them. Outnumbered, the Tornadoes are forced to retreat. As they detour around the Graveyards to get home, they pass the lone Gizmo who has rested and he rejoins the group. As they make their way home, a group of feral dogs attacks the group. The troop takes to the high branches, but Gizmo is stranded on lower branches and unable to go higher. The dogs lay down and wait.
3	"Episode 3" "Gizmo's Fate"	27 November 2007	15 February 2008
The dogs leave and the Tornadoes are able to get out of the trees, but Gizmo is left behind again and later killed by a predator. The rest of the Tornadoes casually make their way down the road, but the dogs return and tree them again until something draws them off. The rest of the troop starts to leave, but Amazon is too scared to come out of the trees. Unlike with Gizmo, the troop returns for her. The Graveyards go to enjoy the fruits left behind in a harvest field, while Titus - a five-year-old drifter - and two of his followers from the Nomads, enter Graveyard territory. Titus scents out Luna, who is in heat, but then Blake, the dominant male of the troop, pounces on him from a tree branch 30 feet up and chases him off. Impressed, Luna allows Blake to mate with her. Titus returns three times while Blake is mating with her, but finally accepts defeat and leads his Nomads out of the territory. In the commotion, young Hogarth wanders off from the troop and ends up a mile from the troop and inside the Tornadoes territory.
4	"Episode 4" "Fire and Battle"	27 November 2007	22 February 2008
Six-month-old Hogarth safely makes his way back to the Graveyards' sleeping tree, only to find that the rest of the troop is not there. The farmers have started a fire in their fields to clear them of sisal and the flames are blocking the Graveyards from returning. In the morning, the flames die down and the troop is able to regroup and make its way back to the graveyard. Hogarth is finally reunited with his mother. Titus and his two nomad followers return to the Graveyards' territory, leaving scent markings to challenge the dominant male. Following the scent of Liberty, who is now in heat, Titus makes his move but Blake quickly spots him, attacks and easily chases him off. Once again, Blake earns the mating rights that Titus sought and mates with Liberty. Meanwhile, Titus leads his followers into the Tornadoes' territory, where Snowflake is also in heat. Flash, dominant male of the Tornadoes, attacks and sends him running again. However, Snowflake follows Titus and allows him to mate with her.
5	"Episode 5" "An Unlikely Suitor"	4 December 2007	29 February 2008
Mating season is in full swing at the Graveyard troop. Female lemurs only come into heat once a year and only one female at a time, with today's female being Josephine. The Graveyards males are all chasing after them, starting with Josephine. Blake, the dominant male, easily chases off all of them, though Milton, the second-highest ranking male, is slow to run. After making him chase off the males a few more times, she accepts Blake as her mate. Meanwhile, the Tornadoes enter the Graveyards' territory. Flash, the dominant male of the Tornadoes, attempts to mate with Josephine, but Blake launches a furious attack, joined by the other Graveyard males. Flash retreats, but he returns again. Though Blake is able to chase him off again, in the process his right front paw is badly slashed. When Flash returns one more time, Milton takes the lead in beating Flash and chasing off the rest of the Tornadoes. The next day, queen Crystal comes into heat. Milton takes advantage of Blake's injury to attempt to seduce Crystal, but she ignores him. In an unexpected turn of events, she mates instead with Peg Leg, one of the lowest ranking males.
6	"Episode 6" "A New Generation"	4 December 2007	7 March 2008
The dry season arrives. Amazon, with aid from her mother Flame, has viciously dethroned the pregnant Electra, making her the lowest ranking member of the Tornadoes. Amazon has a week-old baby, Orinoco and is being a more attentive mother than she was with her first son, Gizmo. Electra goes into premature labour, giving birth to her son, named Prince. Electra, weary from giving birth, calls out to the group for help. Amazon, Flame and Amazon's sister Snowflake answer Electra's calls and go to her. They attack Electra, evicting both her and Prince from the troop, then lead the group to their watering hole. Alone and without the protection of the troop, Electra carries Prince to the same watering hole and warily approaches her former group. They don't attack her, but instead ignore her and leave to return to their sleeping trees.
7	"Episode 7" "The Cycle of Life"	11 December 2007	14 March 2008
Prince, Electra's day-old baby, was too weak to maintain his hold on his mother during the night and died. Electra clings to her baby's body and gives calls for help and mourning. The females of the Tornadoes instinctively return her calls, but do not go to her and eventually stop answering. Flash, the dominant male of the Tornadoes, approaches her and attempts to seduce her to mate, but she attacks him and continues guarding Prince's body for hours, before finally leaving for her own safety. The dry season makes it difficult for the lemurs to find food and the Graveyards are becoming divided over food. Liberty and her family are showing signs of malnutrition and she is self-medicating by eating clay to compensate for the lack of good food, while Crystal and her immediate family remain well fed. Crystal leads them to a tamarind tree outside their territory, which requires them passing through a large field that offers little cover, enabling all members of the troop to eat well. Crystal unexpectedly calls the Graveyards to follow her back to their territory after a short feeding session. However the reason for this becomes clear in the morning. Overnight, Crystal has given birth to her first baby, Jasmine. In desperation for food, Liberty quietly leads her family away from the main troop, splitting the Graveyards.
8	"Episode 8" "Family Ties"	11 December 2007	21 March 2008
Liberty, driven by pregnancy, leads her troop of Graveyards deserters to the tourist camp, where food is abundant. Meanwhile, Crystal struggles to find food for the remaining Graveyards troop members. With her group also struggling, Amazon leads the Tornadoes into the Graveyards' territory to steal food. They do not find any food but, as they leave to return to their territory, the Graveyards find them. The males of both groups handle the fighting, but it ends in a draw, with the Tornadoes returning home and the Graveyards going to the watering hole. As they drink, Liberty and the others return. Though Crystal doesn't attack her, she leaves Liberty and her group to drink while she moves on. Electra, former queen of the Tornadoes, watches the Graveyards from a distance, but waits until they leave to go to drink. Though Liberty and her group are back with the Graveyards, they sleep apart from Crystal and the others. Crystal's mother, Josephine, gave birth overnight, but was attacked during the night while giving birth, most likely by Liberty. After months of drought, a downpour falls, replenishing the plant life. Crystal and Liberty feed side-by-side, their tensions gone. The members of the troops are all looking scruffy and ragged. Peg Leg, in particular, has lost a lot of fur possibly from illness.
9	"Episode 9" "More Mouths to Feed"	18 December 2007	28 March 2008
The lemurs are suffering from hair loss from malnutrition, but Peg Leg and his sidekick Nimbus are both showing signs of excessive loss. They have been eating lucina plants, a toxic plant that causes hair loss in lemurs. As the lowest ranking members, the males are left eating the lucina while the females eat higher quality food. Liberty leaves the foraging party to return to the troop's sleeping tree. There, she gives birth to a daughter named Lily. At the end of the day, Crystal leads the Graveyards back home, however Peg Leg and Nimbus break off from the group. They spend the night away from the group. In the morning, a fatigued Liberty joins the Graveyards as they eat from a cactus, but Lily is weak from lack of milk and struggles to hang on to her mother. The next day, Crystal leads the group to the watering hole, but when Liberty tries to drink Crystal chases her away. Liberty's four-year-old daughter Emily gives birth to her first baby, Pixie. Desperate to feed her daughter and the rest of the Graveyards, Crystal leads the group on a raid into the Tornadoes' territory.
10	"Episode 10" "The Royal Family"	18 December 2007	11 April 2008
Crystal leads the Graveyards on a rush for the trees in Tornadoes territory, but they are quickly chased off by their rivals. She leads them instead to the tourist camp, where four other lemur troops are also looking for food. They are able to eat their first good meal in days. A newborn baby from another troop is abandoned by its mother. One of the Graveyards females, Emily who has a newborn of her own, finds the baby and picks it up. However, the baby is too weak to hold on to her fur. The Graveyards return to their sleeping tree, but Emily stays behind for a short while. For the sake of her own newborn, she leaves the strange baby and follows her troop home. Peg Leg and Nimbus, unable to find another troop, return to the Graveyards. The troop finds some trees with fresh shoots, but must first chase off some sifakas. Crystal's sister Sophie, who is seven years old and has never had a baby of her own, begins showing an obsessive interest in her niece Jasmine. In the afternoon, while the troop eats at a group of cacti, Josephine bullies her daughter Crystal away from the choicest bits. Sophie uses the distraction to steal Jasmine.
11	"Episode 11" "Desperate Measures"	8 January 2008	TBA
Crystal hears Jasmine's calls and quickly comes to take her back from Sophie. Amazon leads the Tornadoes into the Graveyard Gangs seeking water. Electra, who has been on her own for a week, follow the Graveyard Gang as they pass by her on their way to the same place where the Tornadoes have entered their territory. The Graveyard Gangs and Tornadoes clash, until Amazon and the Tornadoes flee. Electra watches from a distance. Crystal leads her gang into an unknown forest where they find a large number of tamarind pods. Though the area carries the scent of another troupe, Crystal and the others defiantly mark the trees. The forest troupe detects the Graveyards and remark the trees. Marcus marks another tree in view of the other troupe. The forest troupe fiercely attacks, forcing the Graveyard Gang to scatter in retreat. Exhausted from the two fights and long travel, the Graveyard Gang spends a night away from home in strange trees. During the night, lightning starts a brush fire near where the lemurs are sleeping. The troupe flees, but during their flight, Peg Leg loses sight of his sidekick Nimbus.
12	"Episode 12" "Lost But Not Forgotten"	8 January 2008	25 April 2008
After regrouping the morning after the fire, the exhausted Graveyard Gang begins the long journey home. As they move along the path, they encounter a radiated tortoise and a troupe of brown lemurs. While they watch the fast moving tortoise in confusion and curiosity, Peg Leg leaves the group to search for the missing friend. After hours of searching and calling, he finds Nimbus unharmed and sitting on one of the forest paths. In his panic from the fire, Nimbus had run in the opposite direction from the others. They greet each other with a mutual grooming session before heading home. Hogarth also breaks from the group, climbing a tree to investigate something. He is attacked by flycatchers who chase him back to his mother Liberty. The rest of the Graveyards return to find the Tornado gang covering their favorite cactus. The Graveyards are eventually able to chase the Tornadoes off. Peg Leg and Nimbus safely return to their home territory later that evening.
13	"Episode 13" "Lost Souls"	15 January 2008	2 May 2008
Humans visit the Graveyard Gangs home to perform a religious ceremony. Crystal is unable to take to the troop to their watering hole due to the number of people. Electra continues to live alone between the borders of the Tornado and the Graveyard Gang territories, eating termites to survive. In the afternoon, the Tornadoes invades the Graveyard territory. When the groups meet, another battle ensues. The Graveyards lose, and are forced to leave their graveyard and sleeping tree. The Tornadoes take over the Graveyard's former ground. During the battle, Amazon loses track of Orinoco and he becomes separated from the group. She doesn't notice his absence, but remains distracted. Electra uses the opportunity to rejoin the Tornadoes, which yield to her out of memory of her former leadership.
14	"Episode 14"	15 January 2008	9 May 2008
The Graveyards return home to find that humans have ransacked it, digging up various bodies to rebury them with their other relatives. Three hours later, Amazon does not appear to have realized Orinoco is gone, concentrating instead of eliminating the scent of the Graveyards from the area. Amazon's mother Flame, however, hears Orinoco's cries from nearby and goes to retrieve him while carrying her own son Apollo. Reunited with his mother, Orinoco rides Amazon's back as she leads her troupe to their sleeping tree. After the human destruction of the cemetery, Crystal makes the decision to permanently move the group away from their former home in search of a new one. Amazon is more attentive towards Orinoco, while not noticing that Electra is back. While in the forest, Electra gives a warning cry after spotting a Madagascar ground boa nearby, enabling the group to get the babies safely away from it. Amazon moves the Tornadoes into the cemetery that the Graveyards abandoned a few hours earlier. The long running drought finally ends with the start of the rainy season, catching the homeless Graveyards huddled together in a tree.
15	"Episode 15"	22 January 2008	TBA
16	"Episode 16"	22 January 2008	TBA
17	"Episode 17"	29 January 2008	TBA
18	"Episode 18"	29 January 2008	TBA
19	"Episode 19"	4 February 2008	TBA
20	"Episode 20"	4 February 2008	TBA

== Media ==
The complete series was scheduled for release on Region 2 DVD in Europe as a 3 disc box set by Eureka Entertainment on 22 September 2008.
