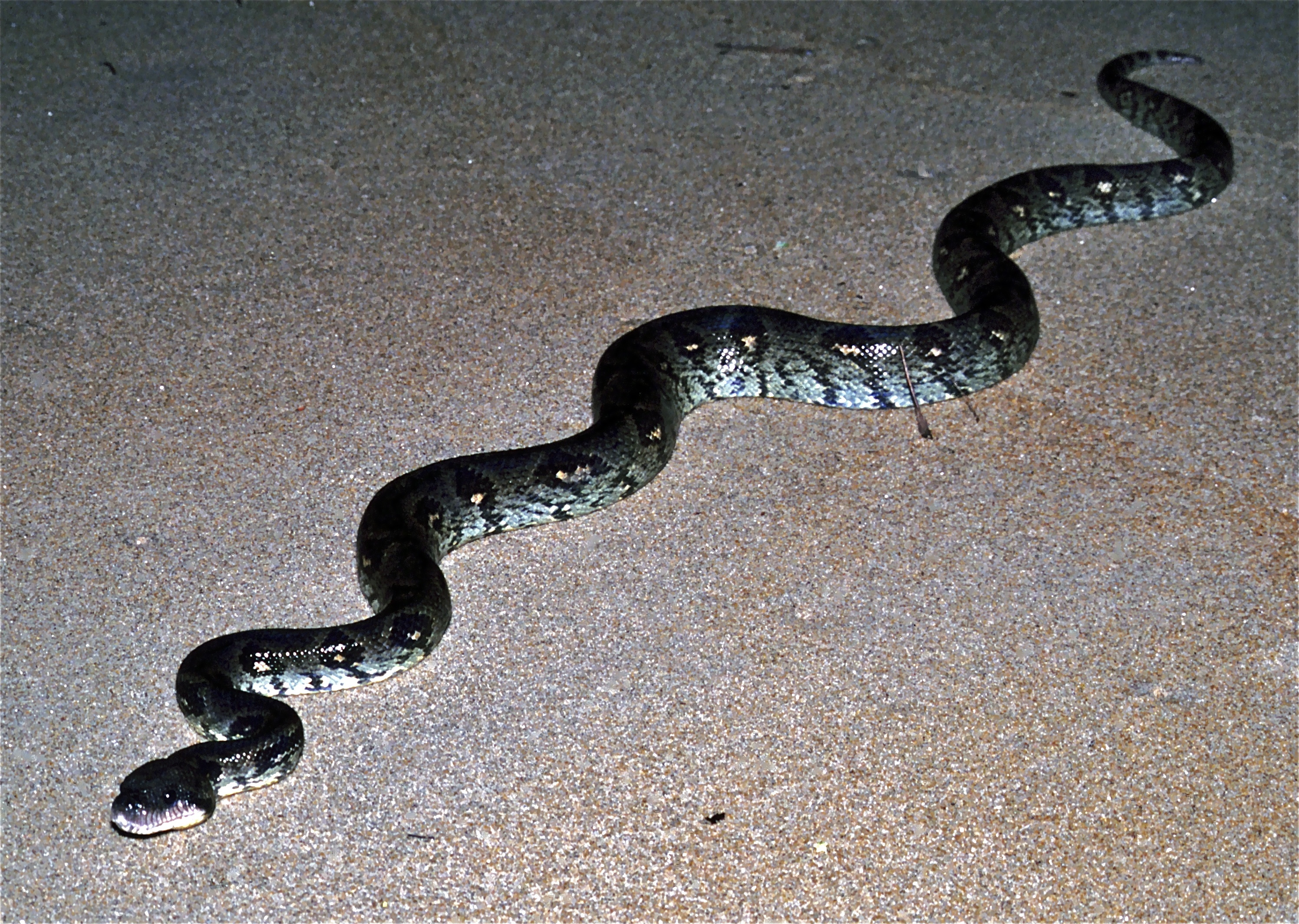

Conservation status
- Least Concern (IUCN 3.1)
- CITES Appendix I

Scientific classification
- Kingdom: Animalia
- Phylum: Chordata
- Class: Reptilia
- Order: Squamata
- Suborder: Serpentes
- Family: Boidae
- Genus: Sanzinia
- Species: S. madagascariensis

Binomial name
- Sanzinia madagascariensis (A.M.C. Duméril & Bibron, 1844)

Synonyms
- Xiphosoma madagascariense A.M.C. Duméril & Bibron, 1844; Sanzinia madagascariensis — Gray, 1849; Corallus madagascariensis — Boulenger, 1893; Boa mandrita Kluge, 1991 (replacement name); Sanzinia madagascariensis — Glaw & Vences, 1994; Boa mandrita — McDiarmid, Campbell & Touré, 1999; Sanzinia madagascariensis — Andreone et al., 2000; Sanzinia madagascariensis — Vences et al., 2001

= Sanzinia madagascariensis =

Species of snake

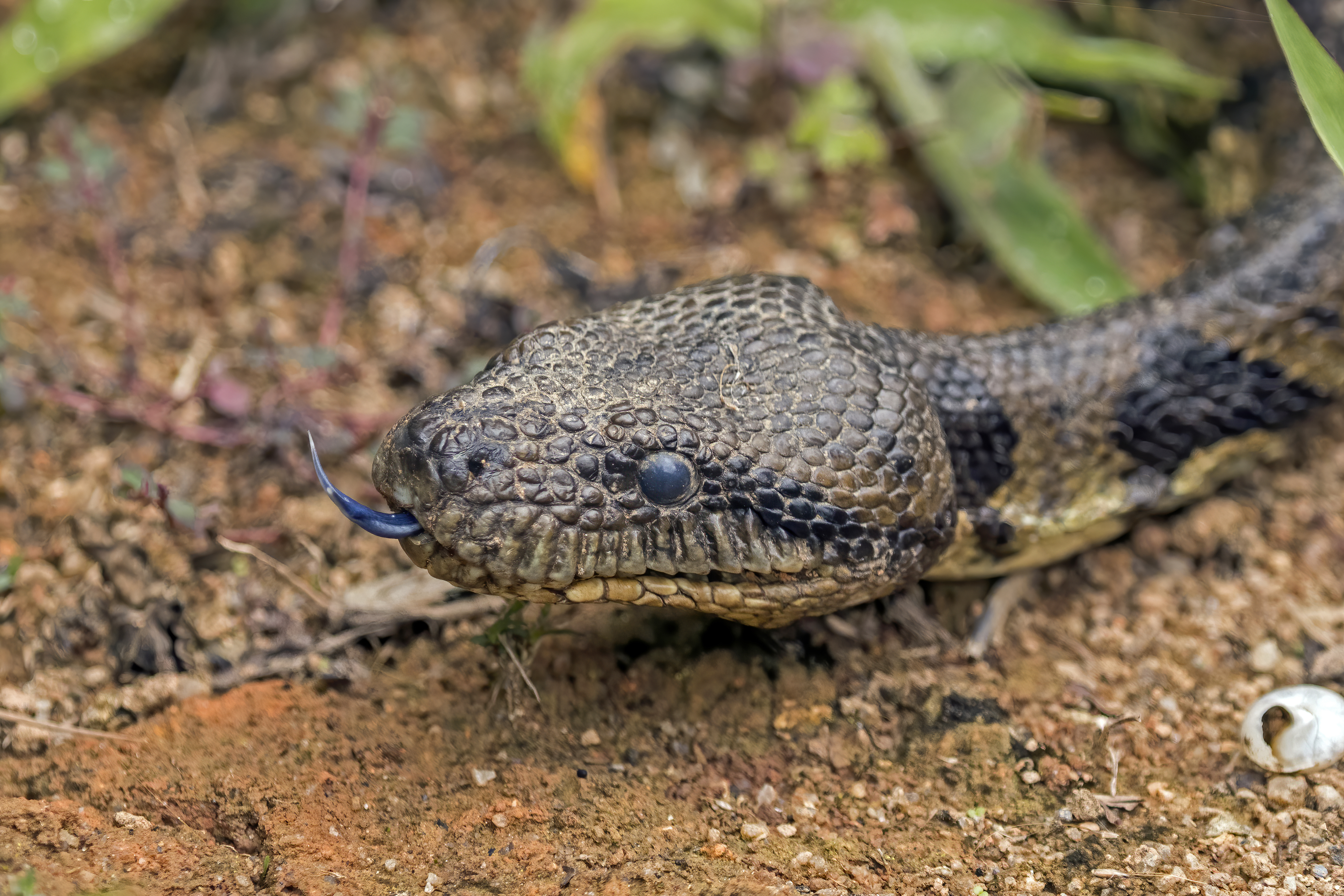
Peyrieras Reptile Reserve, Madagascar

Sanzinia madagascariensis, also known as the Madagascar tree boa or Malagasy tree boa, is a boa species endemic to the island of Madagascar. It was once considered conspecific with the Nosy Komba ground boa (Sanzinia volontany). Like all other boas, it is non-venomous.

== Description ==
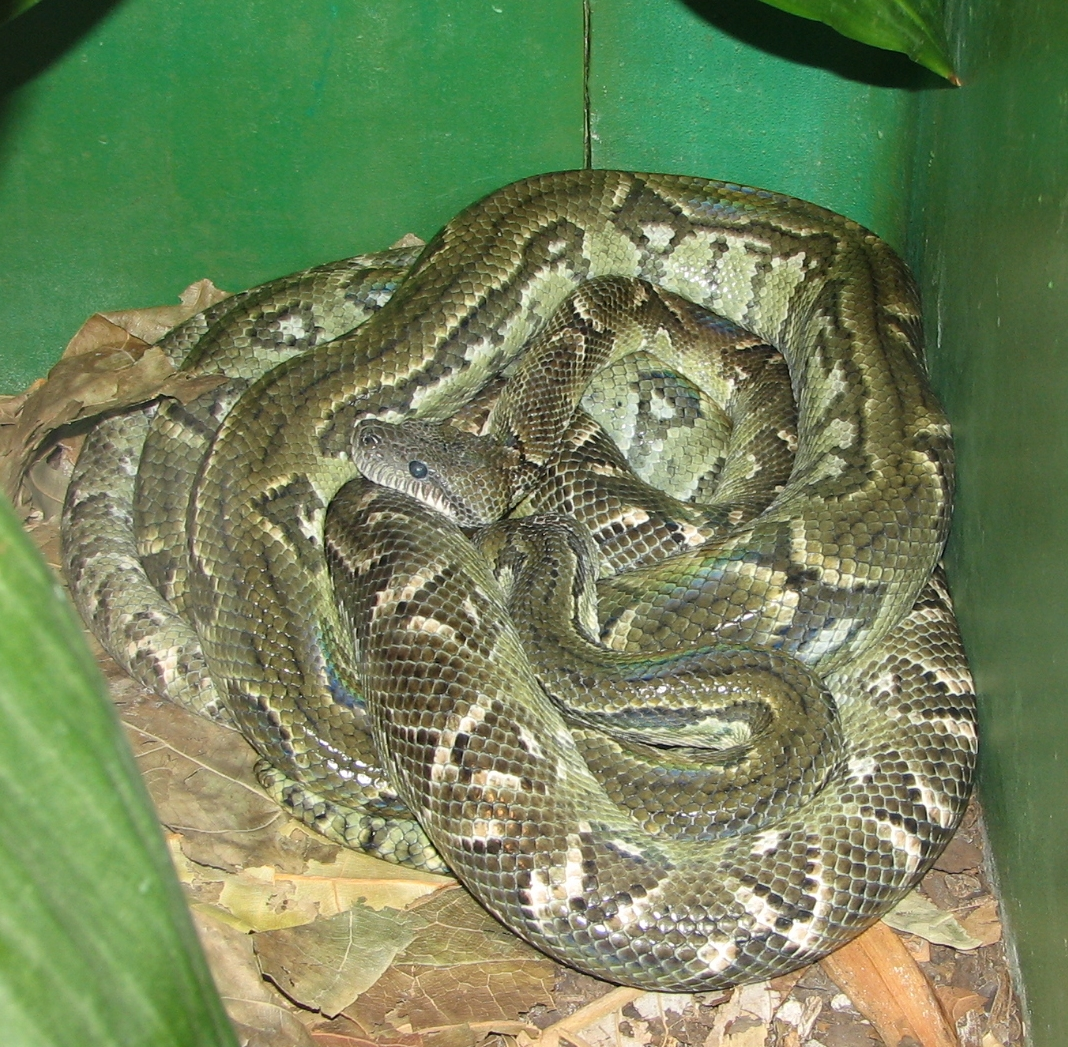
Sanzinia madagascariensis

Adults average 4–5 feet (122–152 cm) in length, although 6–7 foot (183–213 cm) specimens are not uncommon. Thermoreceptive pits are located between the labial scales. Females are larger than males.

It is greenish in colour and is found on the eastern side of Madagascar.

== Distribution and habitat ==
Endemic to Madagascar. The type locality given is "Madagascar". Favors trees and shrubs near streams, rivers, ponds and swamps.

== Conservation status ==
This species was classified as Vulnerable (VU) on the IUCN Red List of Threatened Species in 2006 with the following criteria: A1cd (v2.3, 1994). This means that a population reduction of at least 20% has been observed, estimated, inferred or suspected over the last 10 years or three generations, whichever is the longer, based on a decline in area of occupancy, extent of occurrence and/or quality of habitat, and based on actual or potential levels of exploitation. It is now listed as Least Concern (LC) as it is widespread, present in heavily degraded habitats and it is not subject to any known or suspected threats.

Also listed as CITES Appendix I, which means that it is threatened with extinction and CITES prohibits international trade except when the purpose of the import is not commercial, for example for scientific research.

== Feeding ==
Arboreal and generally nocturnal, S. madagascariensis feeds on bats, birds and other small mammals. Its thermoreceptive pits help it to locate its prey. It will also leave the trees to actively hunt for small mammals on the ground.

== Reproduction ==
Ovoviviparous, females give birth to up to 12 young at a time, each about 15 inches (38 cm) in length.

When females become gravid, their skin color darkens. This adaptation provides increased heat absorption for the developing young. After giving birth, the color returns to normal as soon as the female next sheds her skin. Neonates are a bright red that may warn predators to "stay away", while simultaneously providing camouflage among brightly colored treetop flowers.

== Taxonomy ==
When Kluge (1991) moved Sanzinia madagascariensis (A.M.C. Duméril & Bibron, 1844) to Boa together with Acrantophis madagascariensis (A.M.C. Duméril & Bibron, 1844), it resulted in homonymy. To fix this nomenclatural problem, he proposed the specific name mandrita as a replacement for S. madagascariensis.

It has since been shown that the Madagascar boids and the ones of the genus Boa do not form a monophyletic group, so that the lumping of Sanzinia, Acrantophis and Boa was incorrect, and the name Sanzinia madagascariensis is therefore the correct name for this species.
