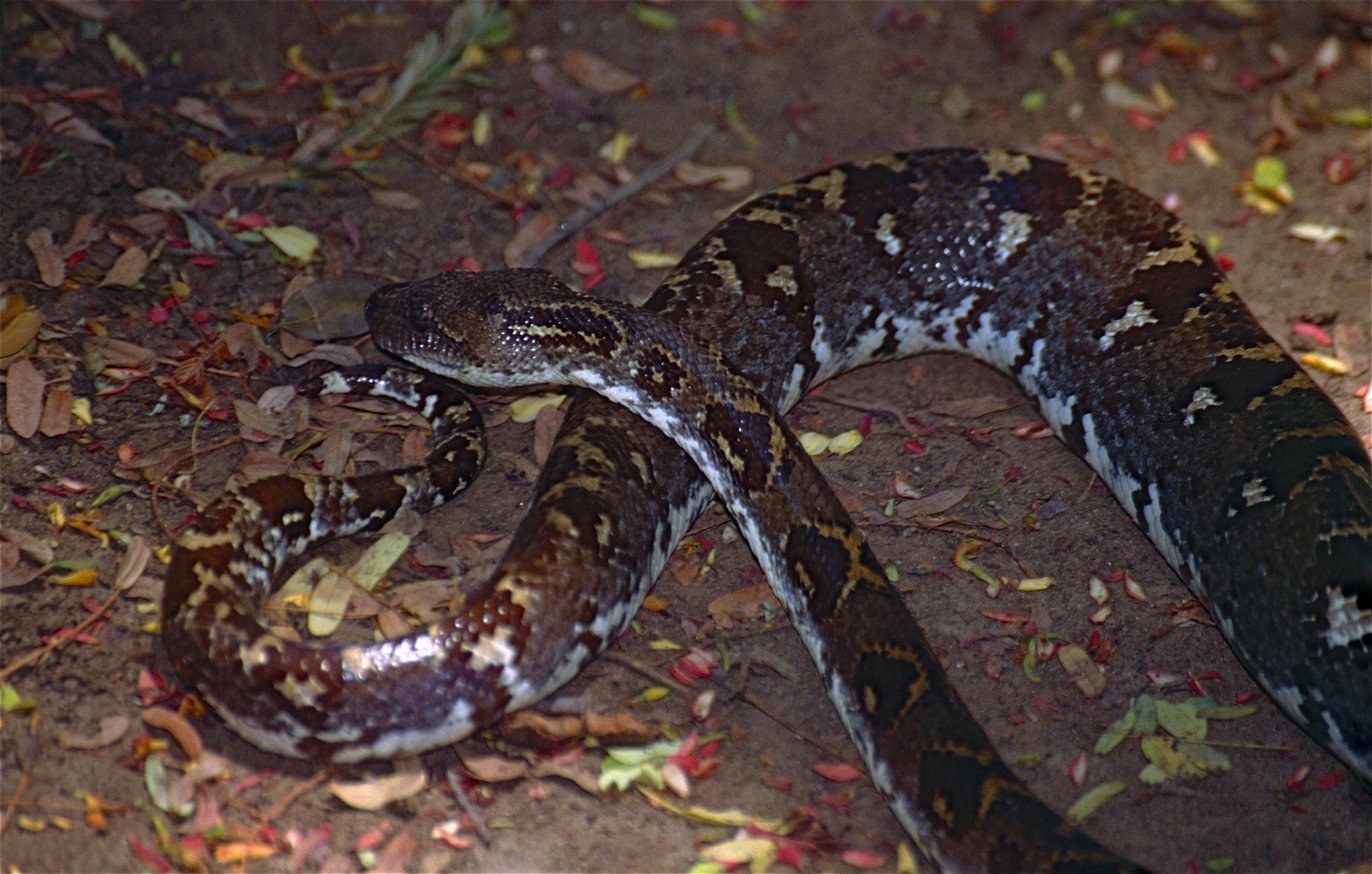

Scientific classification
- Kingdom: Animalia
- Phylum: Chordata
- Class: Reptilia
- Order: Squamata
- Suborder: Serpentes
- Family: Boidae
- Genus: Sanzinia
- Species: S. volontany

Binomial name
- Sanzinia volontany Vences & Glaw, 2004

Synonyms
- Sanzinia madagascariensis volontany

= Nosy Komba ground boa =

Species of snake

The Nosy Komba ground boa (Sanzinia volontany) is a boa species endemic to the island of Madagascar. It is brownish in colour and is found on the western side of the island. It was once considered conspecific with the Madagascar tree boa. Like all other boas, it is not venomous.

== Distribution and habitat ==
Endemic to Madagascar. The type locality given is "Madagascar".

== Feeding ==
Arboreal and generally nocturnal, it feeds on mammals and birds. Its thermoreceptive pits help it to locate its prey. It will also leave the trees to actively hunt for small mammals on the ground. It favors trees and shrubs near streams, rivers, ponds and swamps.
