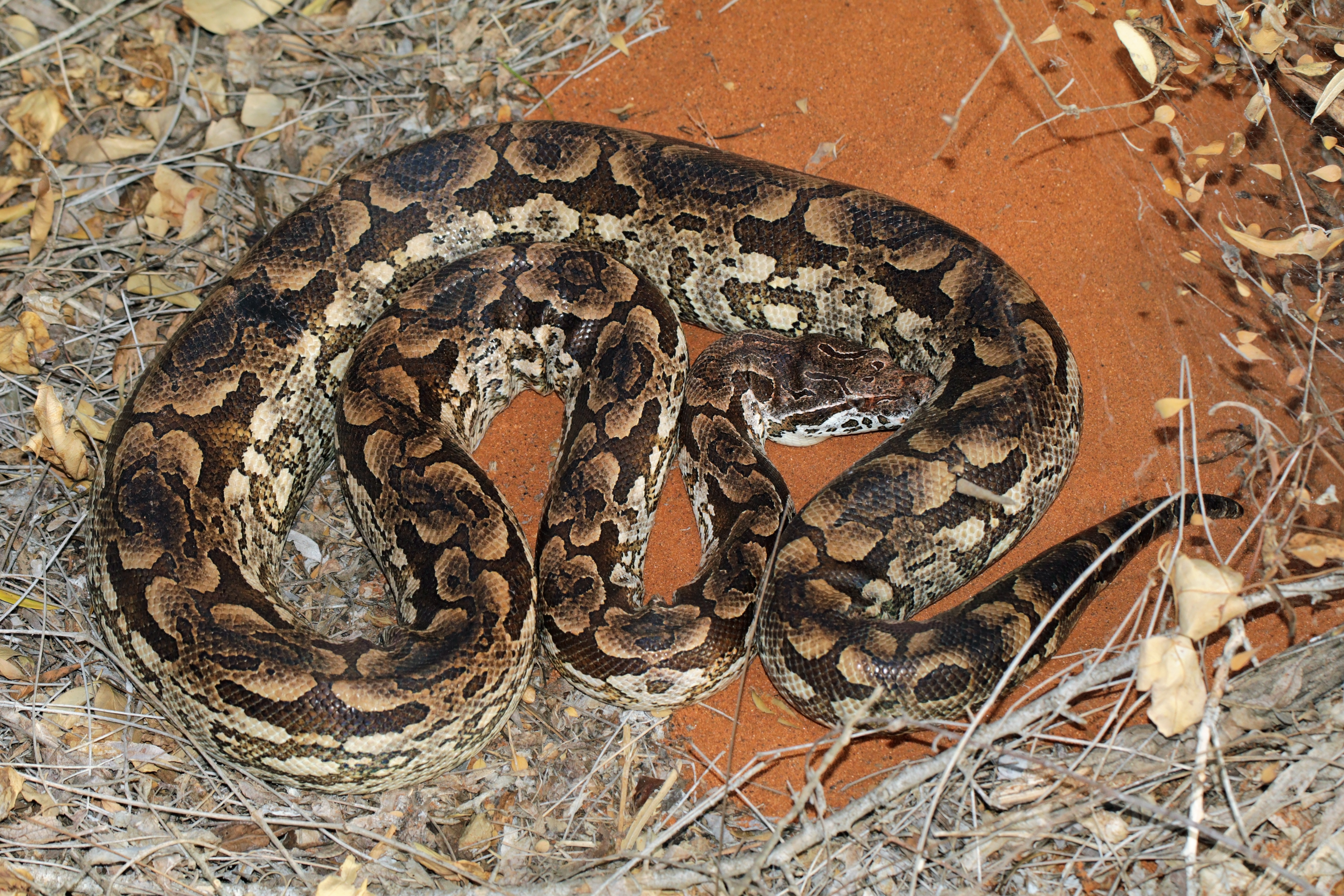
- male in Reserve Reniala, Madagascar

Conservation status
- Least Concern (IUCN 3.1)
- CITES Appendix I

Scientific classification
- Kingdom: Animalia
- Phylum: Chordata
- Class: Reptilia
- Order: Squamata
- Suborder: Serpentes
- Family: Boidae
- Genus: Acrantophis
- Species: A. dumerili

Binomial name
- Acrantophis dumerili Jan In Jan & Sordelli, 1860

Synonyms
- Acrantophis dumerili Jan In Jan & Sordelli, 1860; Acrantophis dumerilii — Jan, 1863; Boa dumerilii — Boulenger, 1893; Acrantophis madagascariensis dumerili — Stull, 1935; Acrantophis dumerili — Guibé, 1949; Boa dumerili — Kluge, 1991

= Acrantophis dumerili =

Species of snake

Acrantophis dumerili, commonly known as Dumeril's boa, is a species of non-venomous snake in the family Boidae. The species is endemic to Madagascar. No subspecies are currently recognized.

== Etymology ==
The specific name, dumerili, is in honor of French herpetologist André Marie Constant Duméril.

== Description ==
Adults of A. dumerili usually grow to 6.5 feet (2 m) in total length (including tail) with the maximum reported to be 8 feet, 6 inches (259 cm). Males usually have longer skinnier tails, while females tend to be larger overall.

The color pattern consists of a gray-brown ground color with darker patches, forming an effective camouflage against the leaf litter of the forest floor of their native habitat.

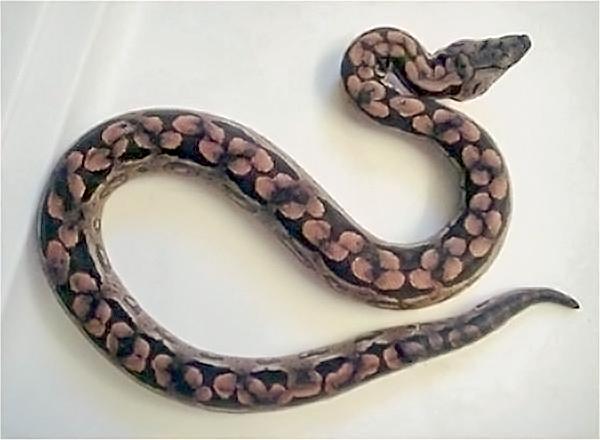

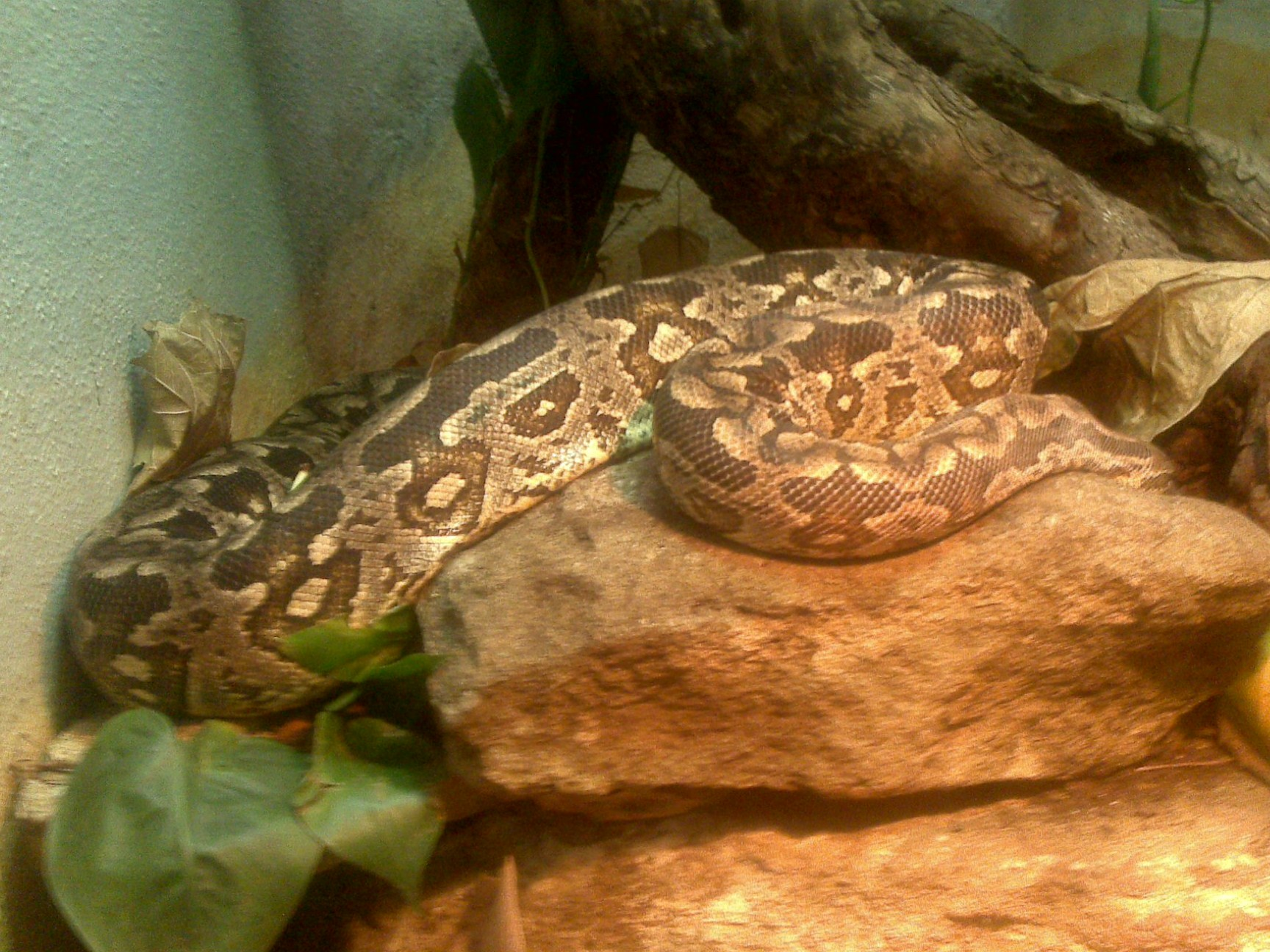
in London Zoo

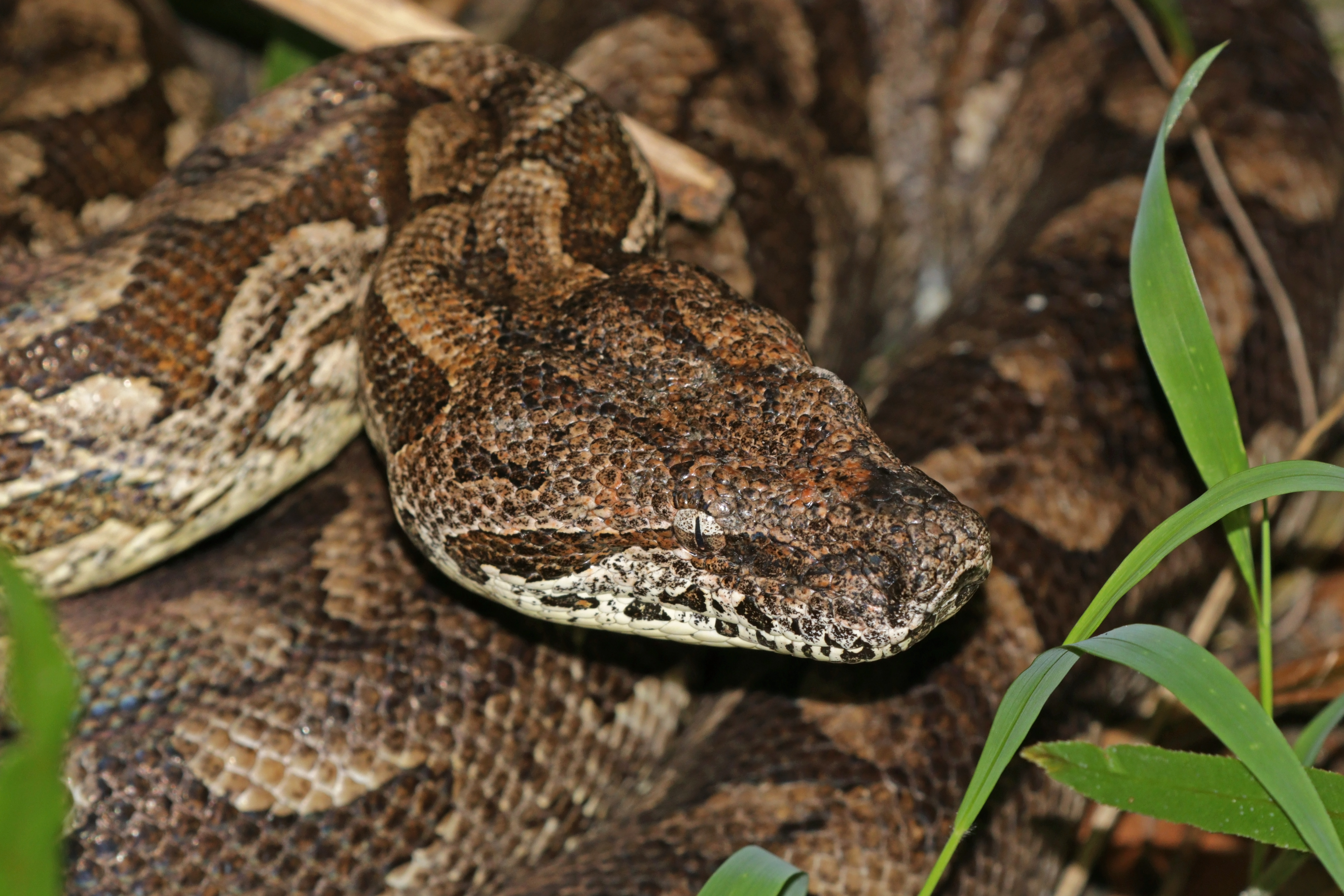
in Isalo National Park, Madagascar

== Distribution and habitat ==
A. dumerili is found on Madagascar. The type locality given in the original description is "Amérique mérid. ?", which is later given as "?" by Jan (1863).

Along the western coast and southwestern regions of Madagascar, it is found in a semi-arid habitat that gets fairly low amounts of precipitation.

Durmeril Ground Boa's live in semi-arid forest along the western to southwestern parts of Madagascar. Their habitats consist of leaf litter, loose dirt, and rocky terrain for camouflage. When needed, these snakes will use burrows made by other animals as a shelter.

== Feeding ==
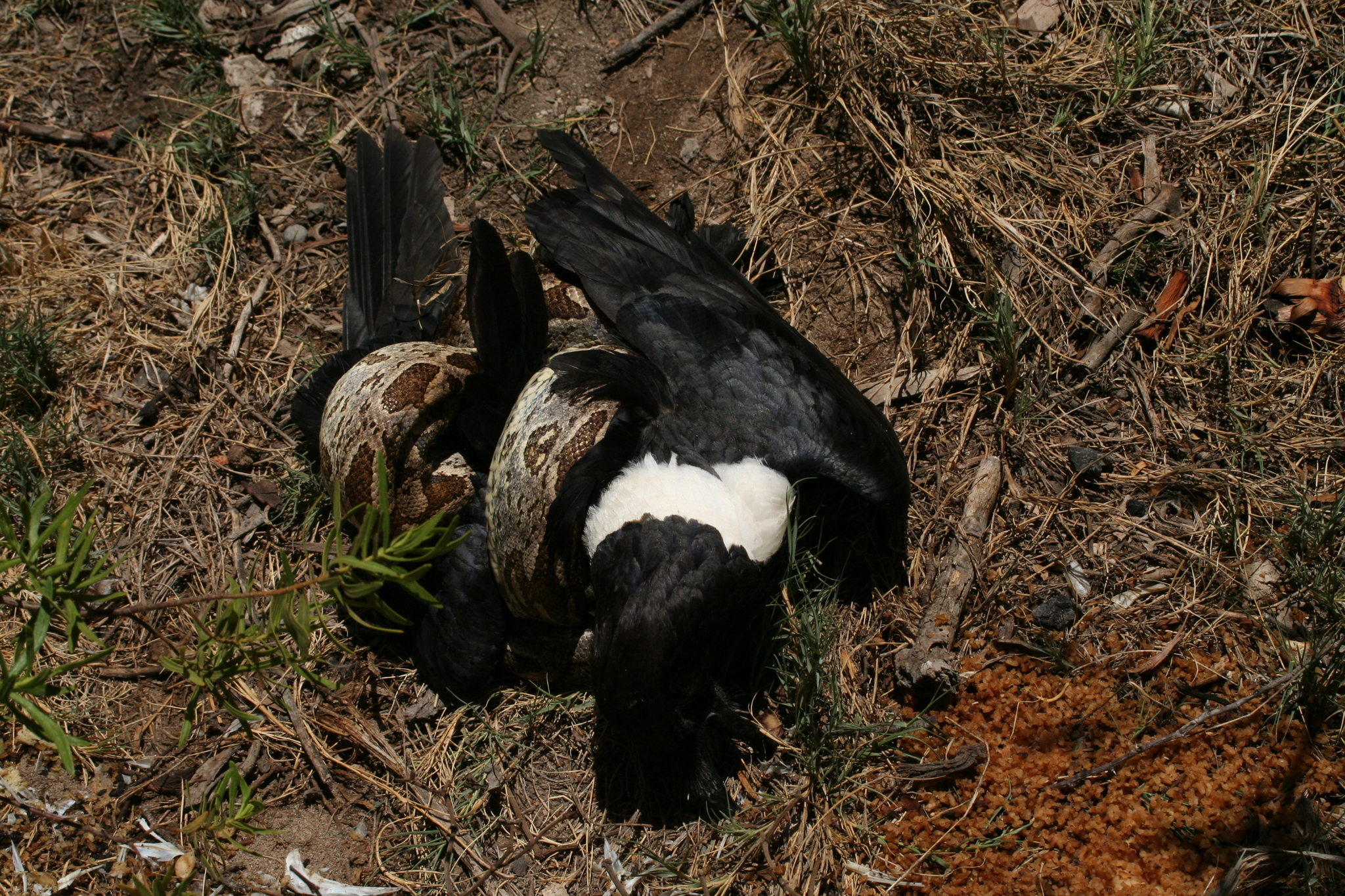
Eating a pied crow

The diet of A. dumerili consists of small animals, such as birds, lizards, and small mammals, including juvenile lemurs. It is also known to prey on other snakes. These snakes are opportunistic feeders that may hunt during the day or at night. They can also be found on the ground floor or in trees when hunting (Raxworthy 2003; Vences and Glaw 2003; Gardner et al. 2017). They have been found to have toads, insects, and indigestible plants, as well as detritus in their stomach. These were all either eaten in the process of hunting another animal or were in the stomach of the animal that they consumed (Pendlebury 1974). They will use their muscular body type to constrict their prey prior to consumption. Although they can reach up to 6-8 feet in length, they typically are more docile creatures and will continue to eat smaller animals and amphibians.

== Reproduction ==
In A. dumerili sexual maturity is reached within 3 to 5 years of age. Males have anal spurs, which are used in courtship. The mating season is March through May, and the young are born some 6 to 8 months later. Ovoviviparous, females give birth to a litters of 6-28. Neonates are 12-18 inches (30–46 cm) long.

== Conservation status ==
The species A. dumerili is classified as Least Concern (LC) on the IUCN Red List for the following criteria: A1cd (v2.3, 1994). This means that a population reduction of at least 20% has been observed, estimated, inferred or suspected over the last 10 years or three generations, whichever is the longer, based on a decline in area of occupancy, extent of occurrence and/or quality of habitat, and based on actual or potential levels of exploitation. The species was last assessed in 2011.

A. dumerili is also listed as CITES Appendix I, which means that it is threatened with extinction and CITES prohibits international trade except when the purpose of the import is not commercial, for example for scientific research.

It is threatened by deforestation and human persecution. In some areas it is feared and often killed on sight. Although some native lore would relate stories of the souls of the tribes ancestors being in the snake skins, because patterns of faces on the sides of the snakes are interpreted, making them religiously sacred and therefore not dangerous to some cultures.

=== Captivity ===
Once exported from Madagascar in great numbers, trade in A. dumerili has since been heavily restricted. The species is, however, quite prolific in captivity, and captive bred individuals are easy to find in the exotic pet trade. Though its size makes it more suited to someone experienced with large constrictors, it has a typically docile nature, and readily feeds on rats. The main concern is that it is prone to stress, which can sometimes cause it to stop eating or can contribute to other health issues.
