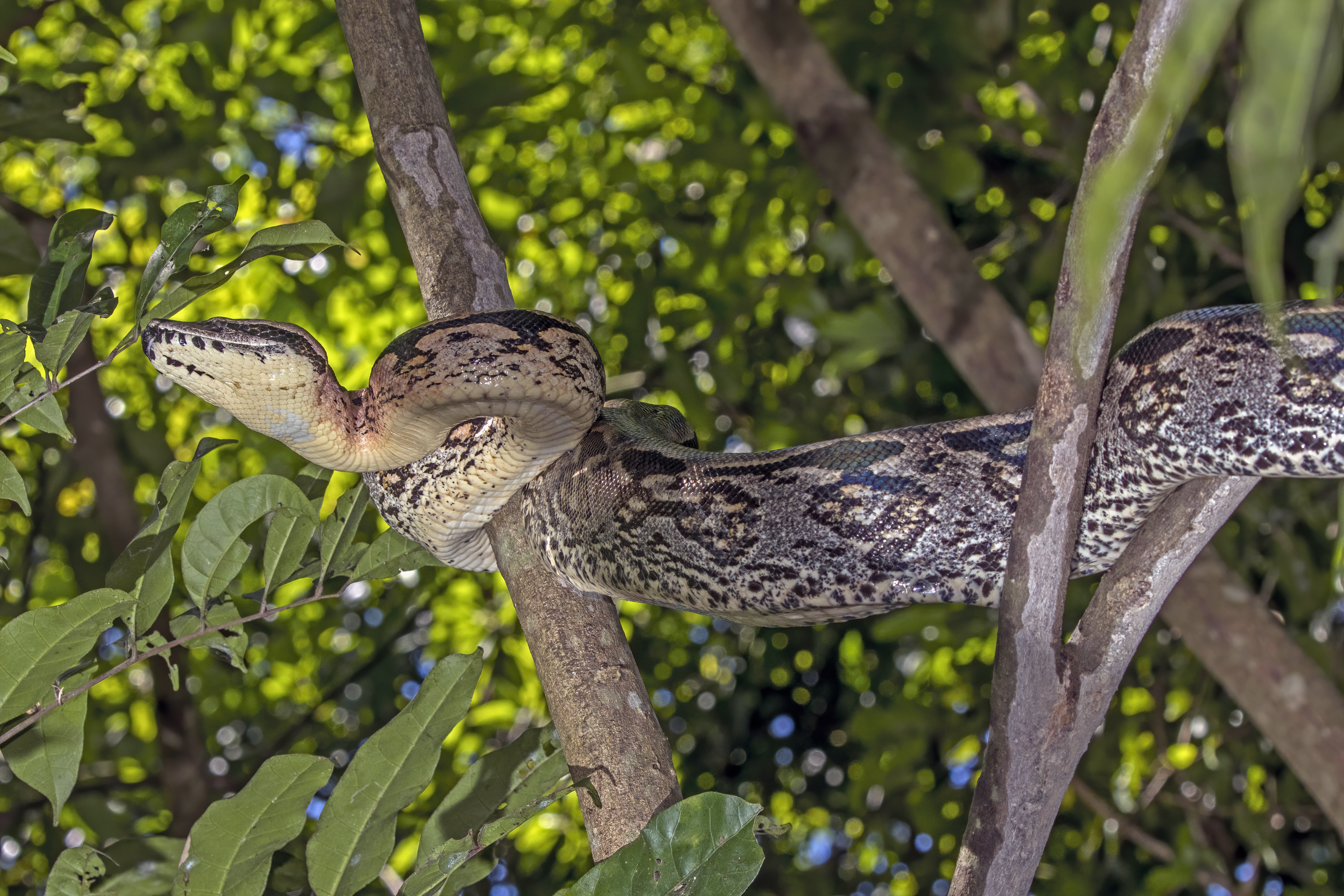
- in Lokobe Strict Reserve, Madagascar

Conservation status
- Least Concern (IUCN 3.1)
- CITES Appendix I

Scientific classification
- Kingdom: Animalia
- Phylum: Chordata
- Class: Reptilia
- Order: Squamata
- Suborder: Serpentes
- Family: Boidae
- Genus: Acrantophis
- Species: A. madagascariensis

Binomial name
- Acrantophis madagascariensis (A.M.C. Duméril & Bibron, 1844)

Synonyms
- Pelophilus Madagascariense A.M.C. Duméril & Bibron, 1844; Boa madagascariensis — Boulenger, 1893; Acrantophis madagascariensis madagascariensis — Stull, 1935; Acrantophis madagascariensis — Guibé, 1949; Boa madagascariensis — Kluge, 1991; Acrantophis madagascariensis — Glaw & Vences, 1994; Boa madagascariensis — McDiarmid, Campbell & Touré, 1999; Acrantophis madagascariensis — Vences et al., 2001

= Acrantophis madagascariensis =

Species of snake

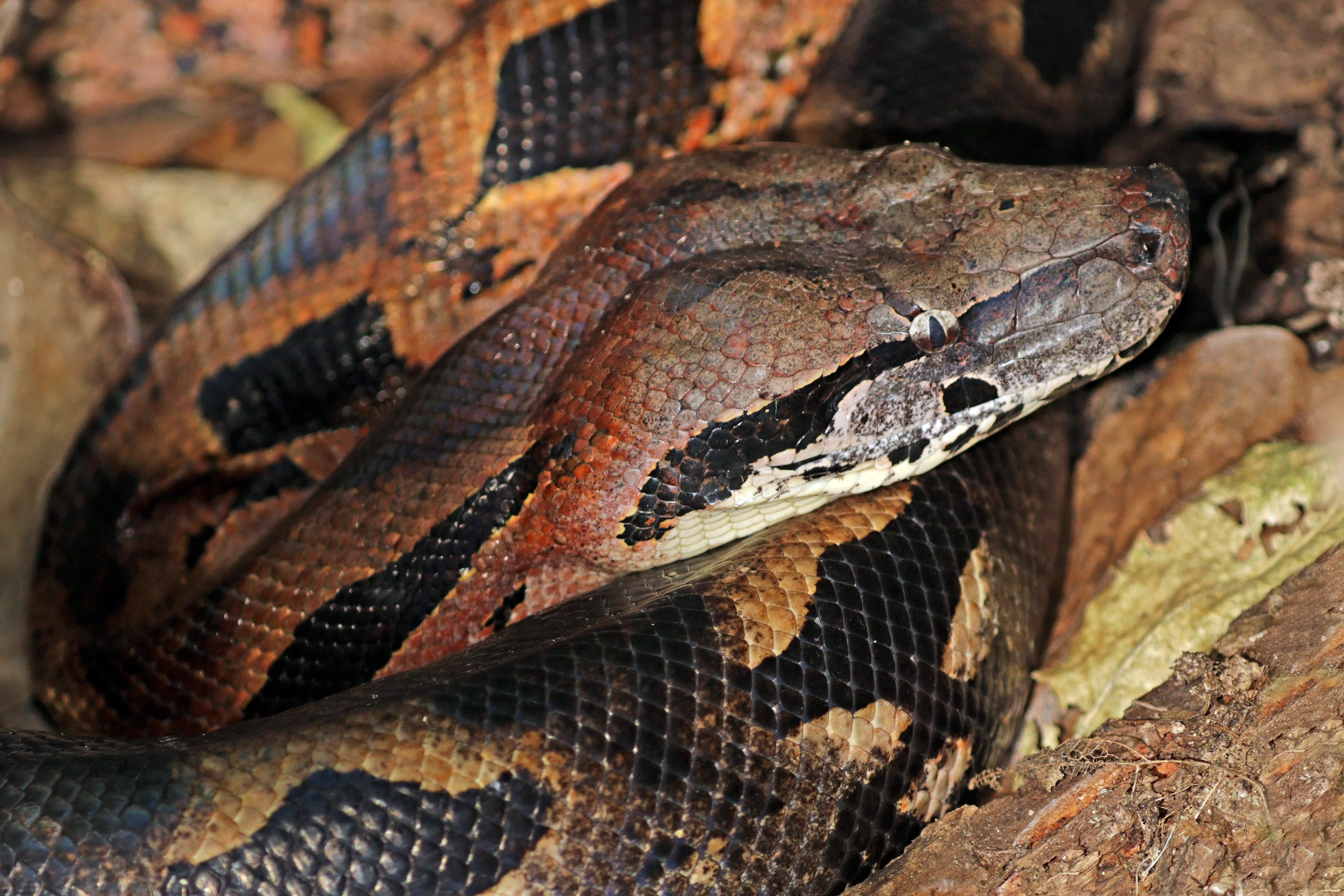
in Lokobe Strict Reserve, Madagascar

Acrantophis madagascariensis is a species of boid snake in the subfamily Sanziniinae that is endemic to the island of Madagascar. Its common names include the Madagascar ground boa and Malagasy ground boa.

== Description ==
This species is included in the Boidae family of snakes, subfamily Sanziniinae. No subspecies are currently recognized.

Adult females can be up to 3 m (10 ft), males are typically smaller, the average size of the population is 2.4 m (8 ft) in length. This is the largest snake species found on the island of Madagascar. Acrantophis madagascariensis, like others in the family, dispatch their prey by constriction.

The color pattern consists of a pale reddish-brown ground color mixed with gray, overlaid with a pattern of dorsal rhombs outlined with black or brown. Sometimes, this creates a vague zigzag impression. The sides are patterned with a series of black ovoid markings with reddish blotches, often bordered or centered with white.

== Distribution and habitat ==
A. madagascariensis is endemic to Madagascar, occurring in the central, northern and western parts of the island.

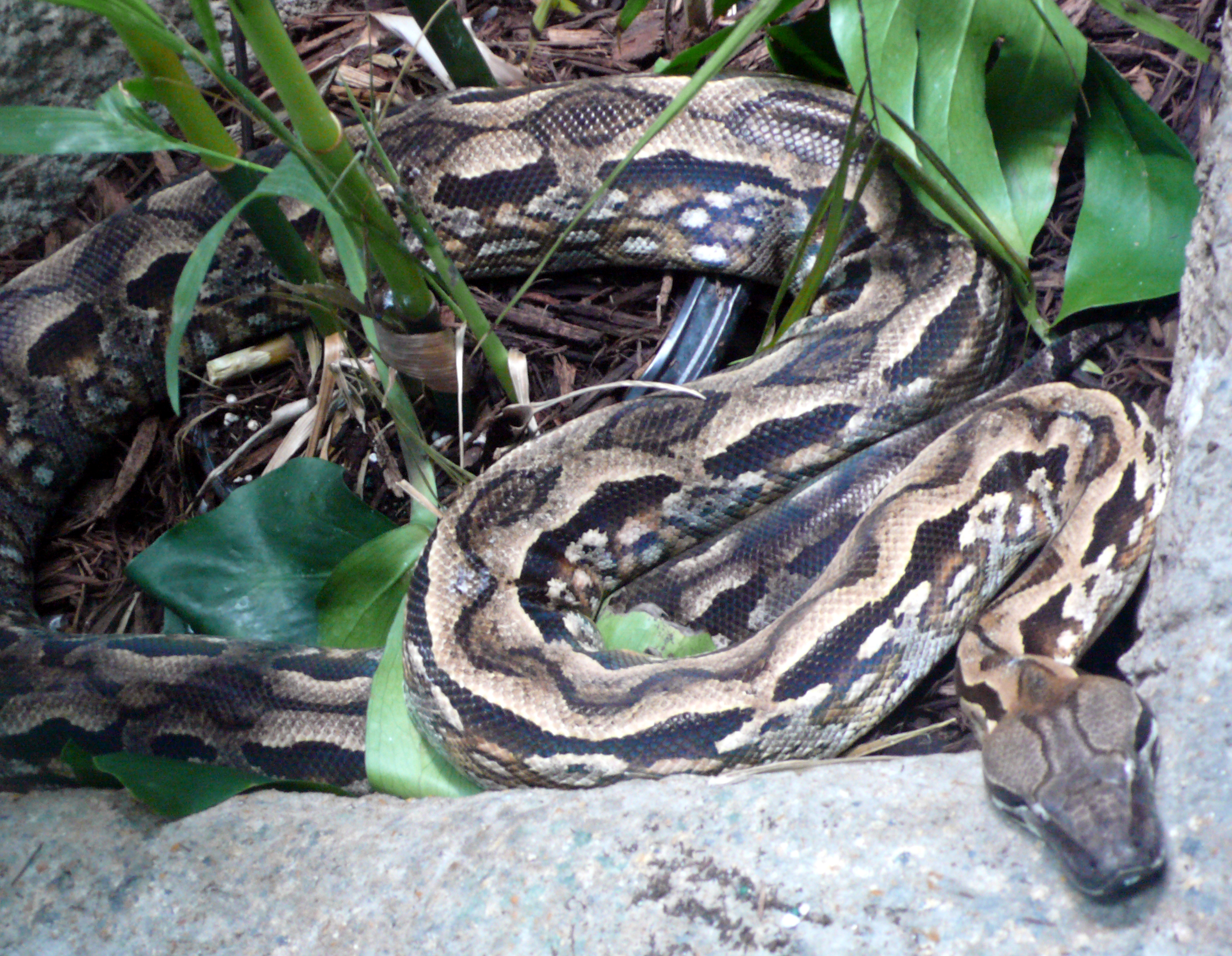

The species usually occurs in sparse, open woodland, such as the Madagascar dry deciduous forests.

== Conservation status ==
Acrantophis madagascariensis is classified as Least Concern on the IUCN Red List of Threatened Species since 2011. Previously it was classified as Vulnerable (VU) with the following criteria: A1cd (v2.3, 1994). This means that a population reduction of at least 20% has been observed, estimated, inferred or suspected over the last 10 years or three generations, whichever is the longer, based on a decline in area of occupancy, extent of occurrence and/or quality of habitat, and based on actual or potential levels of exploitation. The species was last assessed in 2011.

It is also listed as CITES Appendix I, which means commercial international trade is prohibited and non-commercial trade is regulated.

== Threats ==
Current threats include deforestation, human population growth, agricultural and industrial development, and collection for the illegal pet trade. For the time being, it is only threatened locally, and this species is not in any danger as a whole.

== Behavior ==
The species shelters in mammal burrows, fallen trees, debris piles and similar sites that offer some protection. Brumation takes place during the cool and dry winter months, usually May though July.

== Feeding ==
The diet consists of small mammals and birds, including rodents, bats, tenrecs, lemurs, and ducks.

== Reproduction ==
Mating takes place after emerging from brumation. Females may be courted by and copulate with more than one male. Ovoviviparous, females give birth to 2–4 large young after a long gestation period of 4–6 months. Neonates are 19–24 inches (48–61 centimetres) in length and are already capable of feeding on small rodents and birds.
