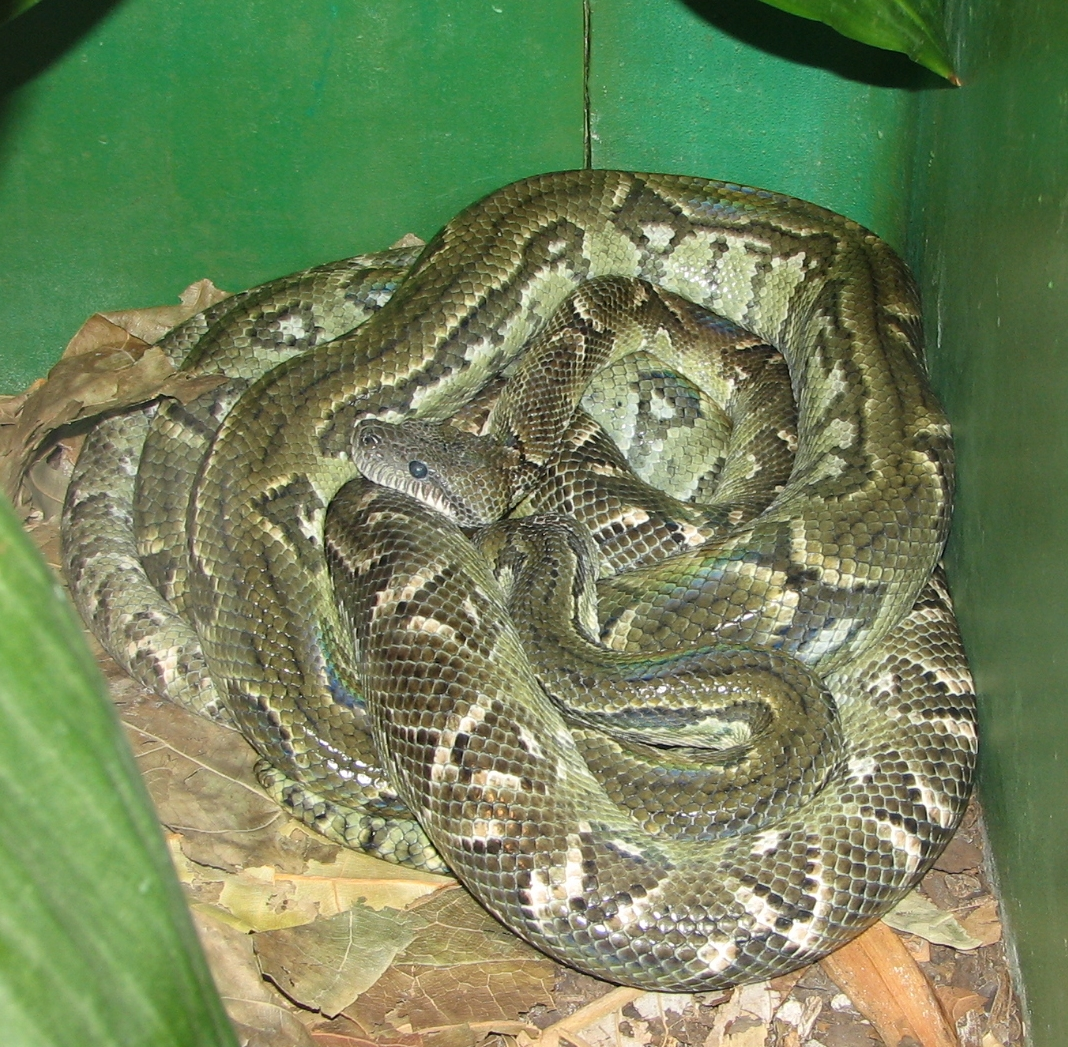
- Madagascar tree boa (Sanzinia madagascariensis)

Scientific classification
- Domain: Eukaryota
- Kingdom: Animalia
- Phylum: Chordata
- Class: Reptilia
- Order: Squamata
- Suborder: Serpentes
- Family: Boidae
- Subfamily: Sanziniinae
- Genus: Sanzinia; Gray, 1849

= Sanzinia =

Genus of snakes

Sanzinia is a genus of snakes in the family Boidae.

The genus contains the following species:

- Sanzinia madagascariensis, Madagascar tree boa or Malagasy tree boa
- Sanzinia volontany, Nosy Komba ground boa

Sanzinia madagascariensis is a rare boa that is highly attractive for the pet trade because they are large and gentle, as well as easy to keep (Ross and Marzec, 1990). It is the eastern species of the genus Sanzinia. They are greenish in color and their newborns are red with white stripes on saddles. The western species, Sanzinia volontany, on the other hand, is a brownish color while their newborns are orange with yellow stripes on saddles and black dots on both sides. They reach maturity in four years and can have anywhere from four to 16 neonates after a gestation period of six to eight months in low temperatures at nighttime (Ross and Marzec, 1990; Radovanovic, 2011, Valeev and Antonov, 2013).
