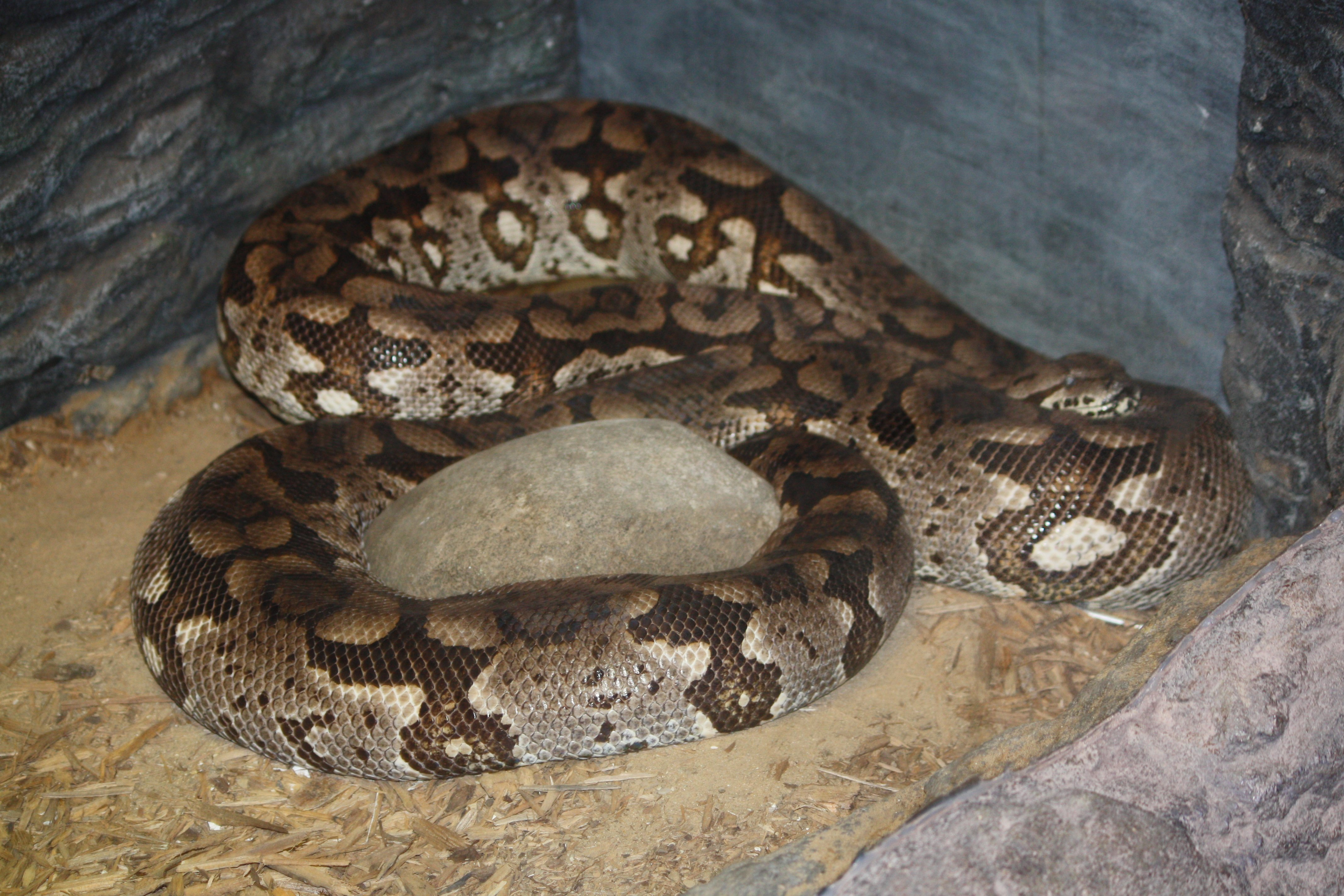

Scientific classification
- Kingdom: Animalia
- Phylum: Chordata
- Class: Reptilia
- Order: Squamata
- Suborder: Serpentes
- Family: Boidae
- Subfamily: Sanziniinae
- Genus: Acrantophis; Jan, 1860

Species
- Two recognized species, see article.

= Acrantophis =

Genus of snakes

Acrantophis is a genus of terrestrial boid snakes endemic to the island of Madagascar.

== Species ==
Two species are currently recognized.

- Acrantophis madagascariensis - (Duméril & Bibron, 1844)- Madagascar ground boa
- Acrantophis dumerili Duméril's boa
