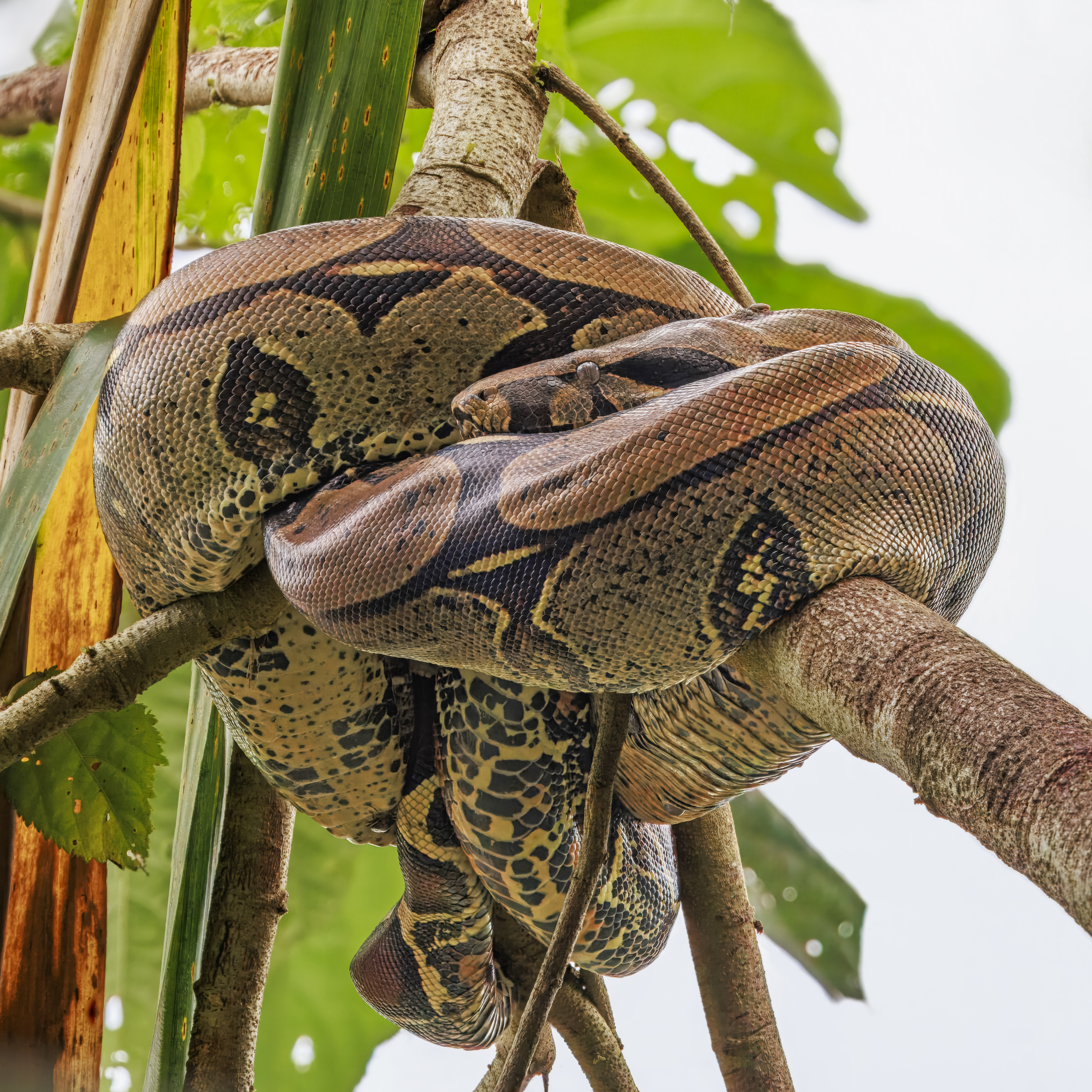
- Boa constrictor (B. c. constrictor)

Scientific classification
- Kingdom: Animalia
- Phylum: Chordata
- Class: Reptilia
- Order: Squamata
- Suborder: Serpentes
- Superfamily: Booidea
- Family: Boidae; Gray, 1825

Subfamilies
- Boinae; Calabariinae (Note: Traditionally placed in Erycinae); Candoiinae (Note: Traditionally placed in Boinae); Erycinae; Sanziniinae; Ungaliophiinae

= Boidae =

Boidae Temporal range: 70.6–0 Ma Late Cretaceous to Present

Family of snakes

The Boidae, commonly known as boas or boids, are a family of nonvenomous snakes primarily found in the Americas, as well as Africa, Europe, Asia, and some Pacific islands. Boas include some of the world's largest snakes, with the green anaconda of South America being the heaviest and second-longest snake known; in general, adults are medium to large in size, with females usually larger than the males. Six subfamilies comprising 14-15 genera and 54-67 species are currently recognized.

== Description ==
Like the pythons, boas have elongated supratemporal bones. The quadrate bones are also elongated, but not as much, while both are capable of moving freely so when they swing sideways to their maximum extent, the distance between the hinges of the lower jaw is greatly increased.

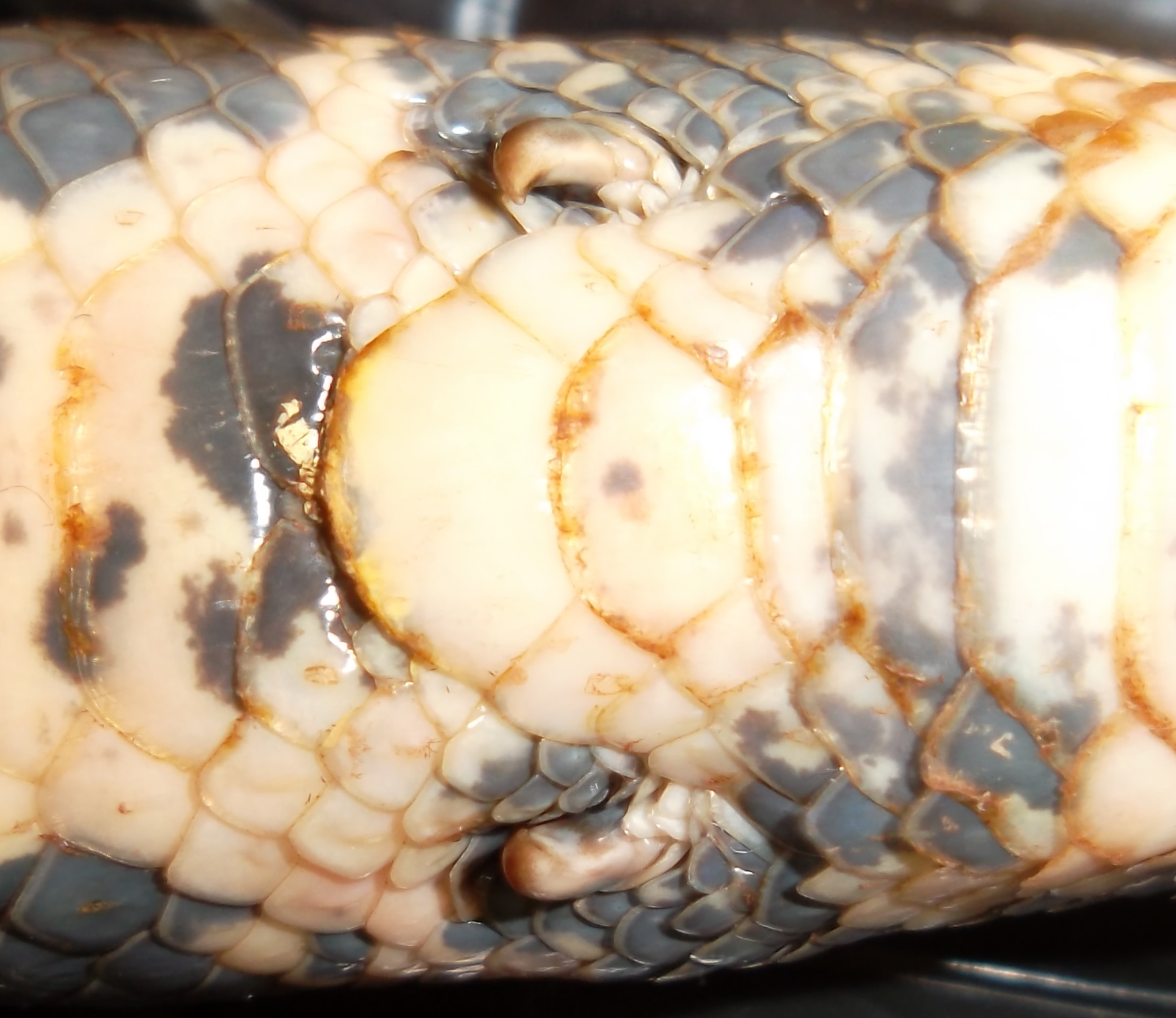
Cloaca region of a Boa constrictor with spurs (rudimentary hindlegs)

Both families share a number of primitive characteristics. Nearly all have a relatively rigid lower jaw with a coronoid element, as well as a vestigial pelvic girdle with hind limbs that are partially visible as a pair of spurs, one on either side of the vent. In males, these anal spurs are larger and more conspicuous than in females. A long row of palatal teeth is present, and most species have a functional left lung that can be up to 75% as large as the right lung.

Boids are, however, distinguished from the pythons in that none has postfrontal bones or premaxillary teeth, and that they give birth to live young. When labial pits are present, these are located between the scales as opposed to on them. Also, their geographical distributions are almost entirely mutually exclusive. In the few areas where they do coexist, the tendency is for them to occupy different habitats.

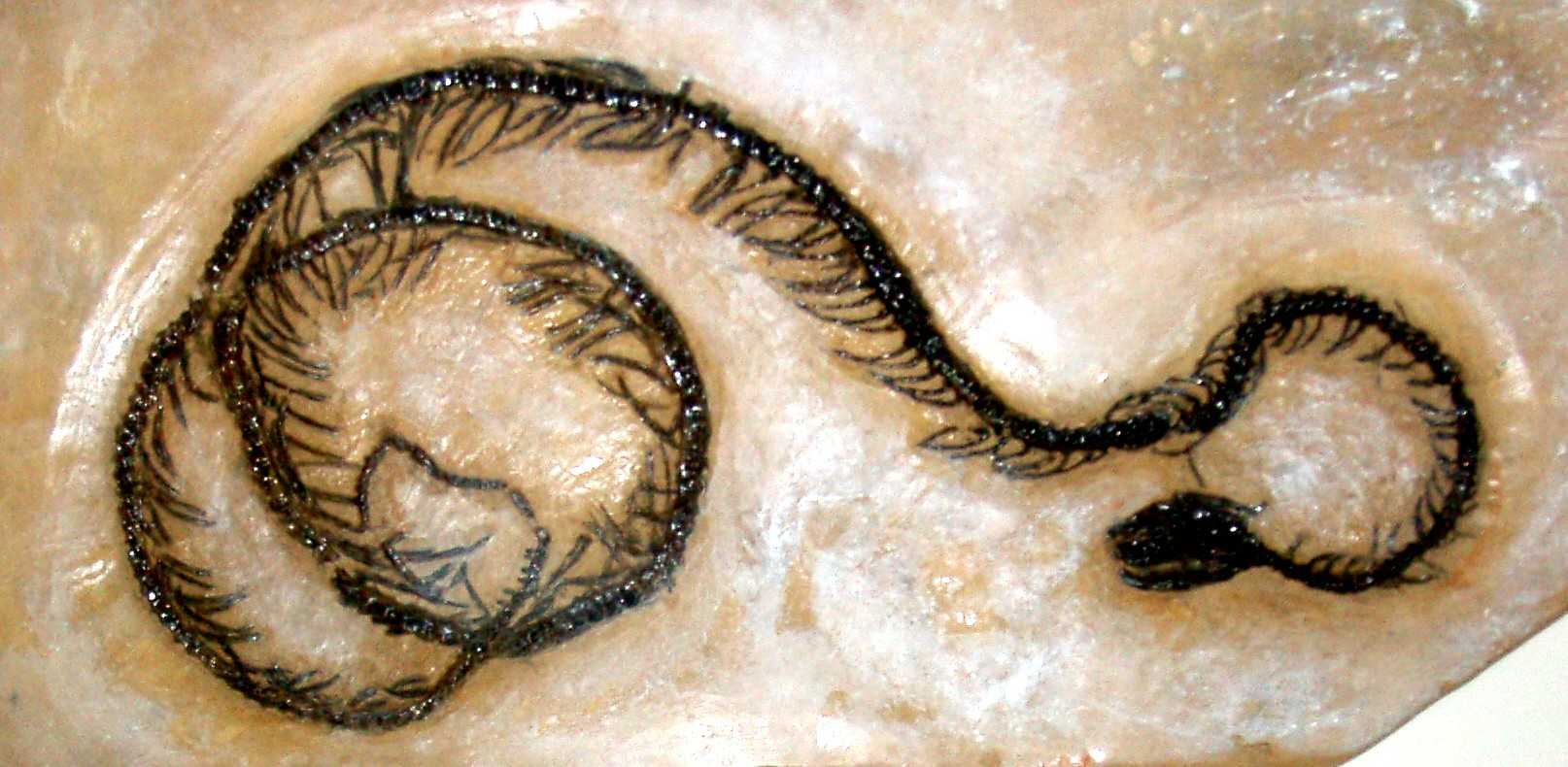
A fossil of Boavus idelmani, an extinct species of boa

Formerly, boas were said to be found in the New World and pythons in the Old World. While this is true of boine boas, other boid species are present in Africa, much of southern Eurasia, Madagascar, New Guinea, and the Solomon Islands, so this is not accurate. However, they seem more abundant in evolutionarily isolated areas. South America was isolated until a few million years ago, with a fauna that included marsupials and other distinctive mammals. With the formation of the Panamanian land bridge to North America about three million years ago, boines have migrated north as colubrids (and various Nearctic mammals) have migrated south, as part of the Great American Interchange.

== Distribution and habitat ==
Most species are found in North, Central, and South America, as well as the Caribbean, while a few are found in southeastern Europe and Asia Minor, North, Central and East Africa, Madagascar, the Arabian Peninsula, Central and Southwestern Asia, India and Sri Lanka, Indonesian islands (Moluccas, West Papua, Talaud, Sulawesi) and Papua New Guinea through Melanesia and Samoa.

== Feeding ==
Prey is killed by constriction; after an animal has been grasped to restrain it, a number of coils are hastily wrapped around it. Then, by applying and maintaining sufficient pressure, the snake prevents its prey from inhaling, so that it eventually succumbs to asphyxiation. Recently, the pressures produced during constriction have been suggested as the cause of cardiac arrest by interfering with blood flow, but this hypothesis has not yet been confirmed.

Larger specimens usually eat animals about the size of a domestic cat, but larger food items are not unknown: the diet of the green anaconda (Eunectes murinus) is known to include subadult tapirs. Prey is swallowed whole, and may take several days or even weeks to fully digest. Despite their intimidating size and muscular power, they are generally not dangerous to humans.

Contrary to popular belief, even the larger species do not crush their prey to death; in fact, prey is not even noticeably deformed before it is swallowed. The speed with which the coils are applied is impressive and the force they exert may be significant, but death is caused by suffocation, with the victim not being able to move its ribs to breathe while it is being constricted.

== Reproduction ==
Most species of boa are ovoviviparous, with females giving birth to live young. This is in contrast to the pythons, which lay eggs (oviparous).

== Subfamilies ==
Subfamily	Taxon author	Genera	Species	Common name	Geographic range
Boinae	Gray, 1825	5	34	true boas	Central and South America and the West Indies
Calabariinae	Gray, 1858	1	1	Calabar python	tropical West and Central Africa
Candoiinae	Pyron, Burbink & Wiens, 2013	1	5	bevel-nosed boas or keel-scaled boas	from Sulawesi through the Maluku Islands, New Guinea and Melanesia to Samoa and Tokelau
Erycinae	Bonaparte, 1831	3	18	Old World sand boas	Southern and Southeastern Europe, Asia Minor, North, Central, West and East Africa, Arabia, Central and Southwest Asia, India, Sri Lanka, western Canada, the western United States, and northwestern Mexico
Sanziniinae	Romer, 1956	2	4	Madagascan boas or Malagasy boas	Madagascar
Ungaliophiinae	McDowell, 1987	2	3	neotropical dwarf boas	Central and South America from southern Mexico to Colombia

Type genus = Boa – Gray, 1825

== Taxonomy ==
Pythons were historically classified as a subfamily of Boidae (called Pythoninae), but it was later determined that they are not closely related to boas despite having superficial similarities.

Almost all of the non-boine boids are frequently elevated to their own full families: Calabariidae/inae, Candoiidae/inae, Charinidae/inae, Erycidae/inae, Sanziniidae/inae, and Ungaliophiidae/inae. The taxonomy of boid snakes has been long debated, and ultimately the decision whether to assign a particular clade to a particular Linnaean rank (such as a superfamily, family, or subfamily) is arbitrary.

The subfamily Ungaliophiinae was formerly made up of four genera. Two of them (Tropidophis and Trachyboa) are actually more closely related to the American pipe snake (Anilius scytale) than to the boas, and are now placed in the family Tropidophiidae within the superfamily Amerophidia. The other two genera (Ungaliophis and Exiliboa) are the sister group of the Charina/Lichanura clade within Boidae.

== Gallery ==
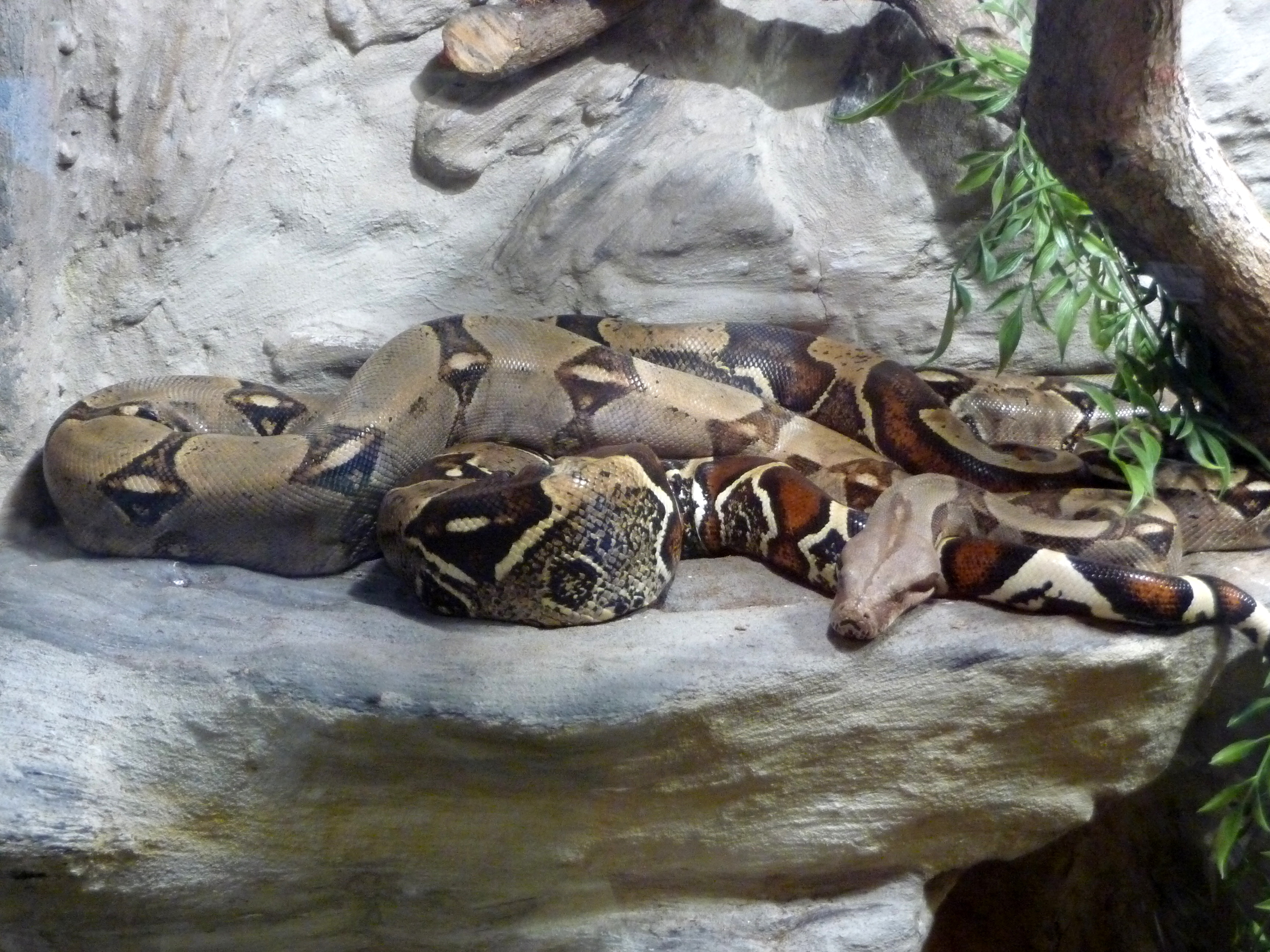
Boa type species; the boa constrictor (B. constrictor)

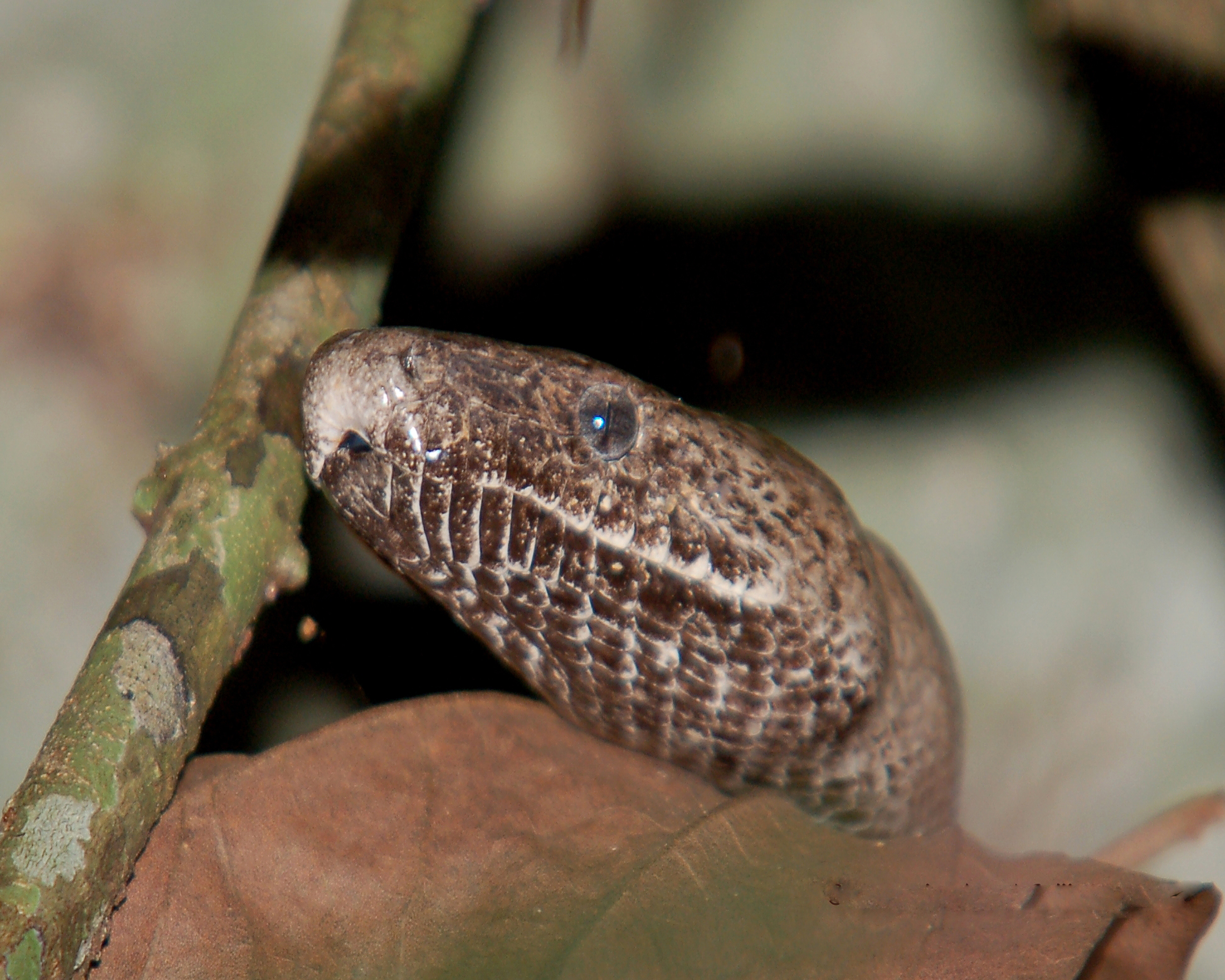
Chilabothrus type species; the Puerto Rican boa (C. inornatus)

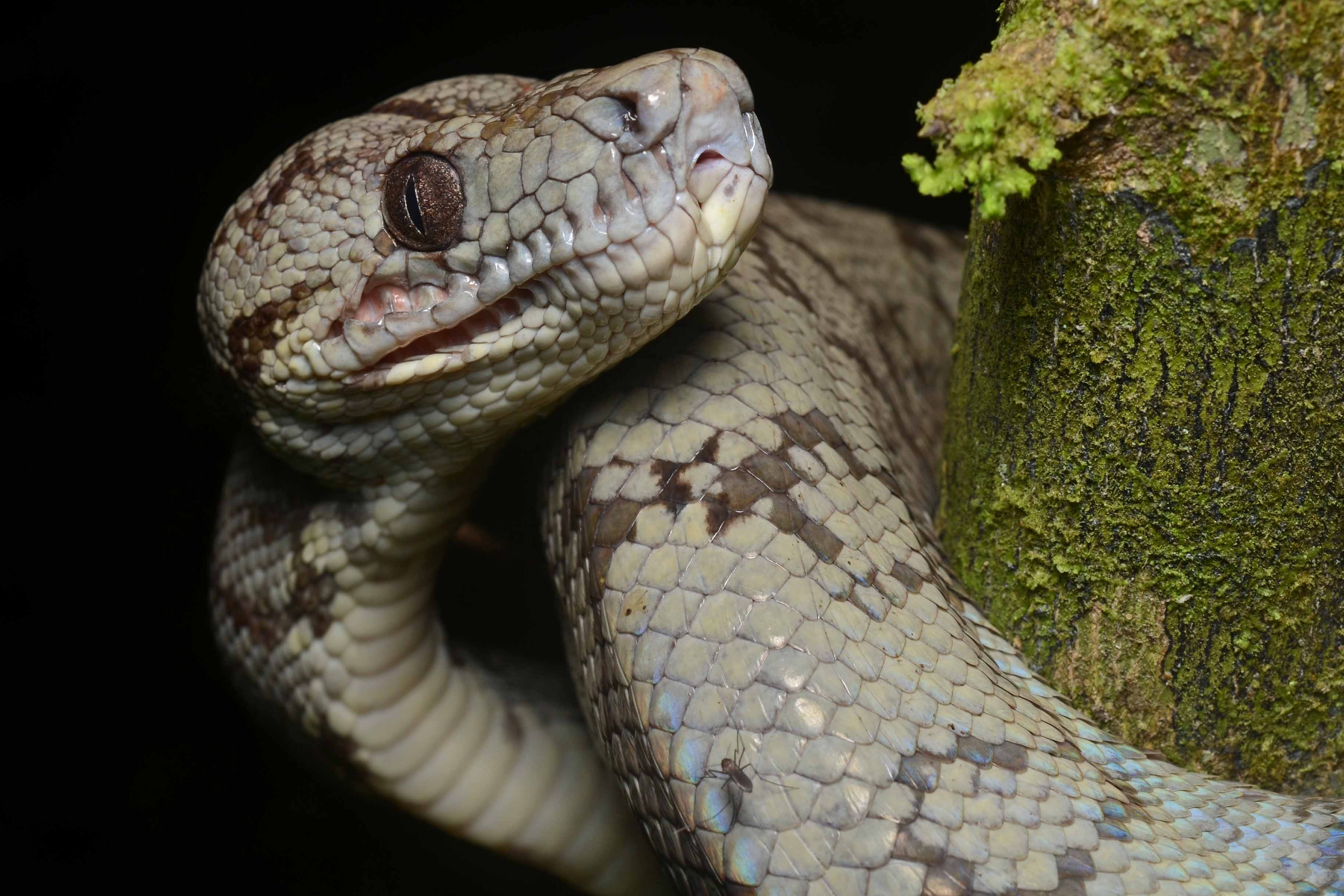
Corallus type species; the Amazon tree boa (C. hortulana)

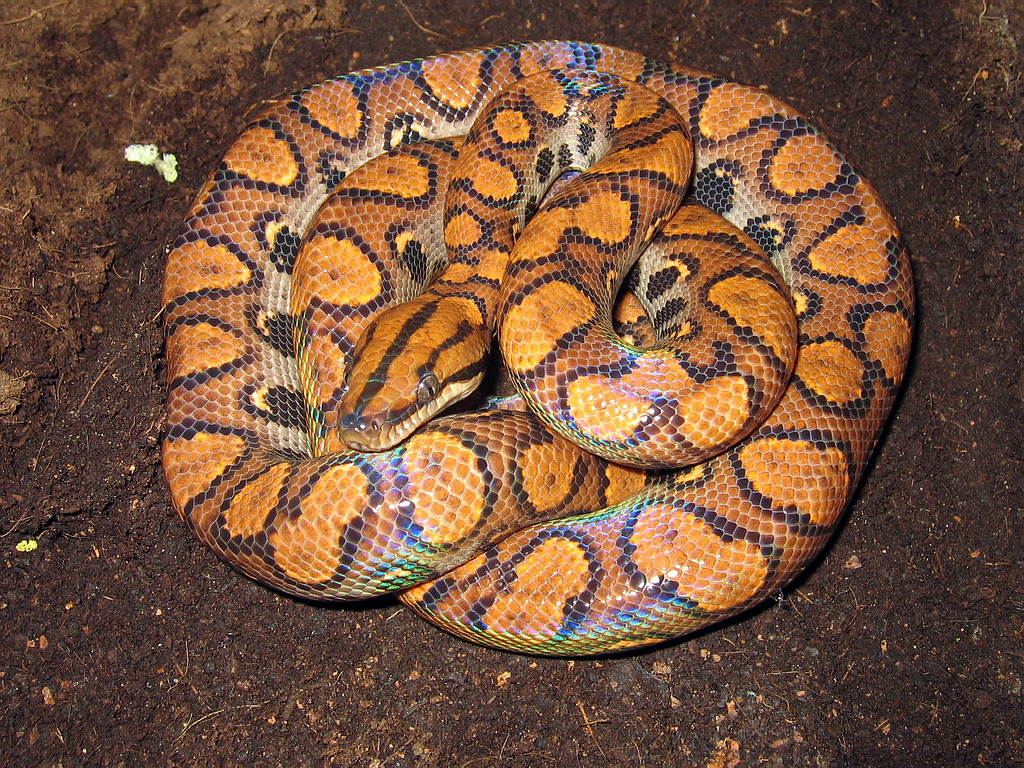
Epicrates type species; the rainbow boa (E. cenchria)

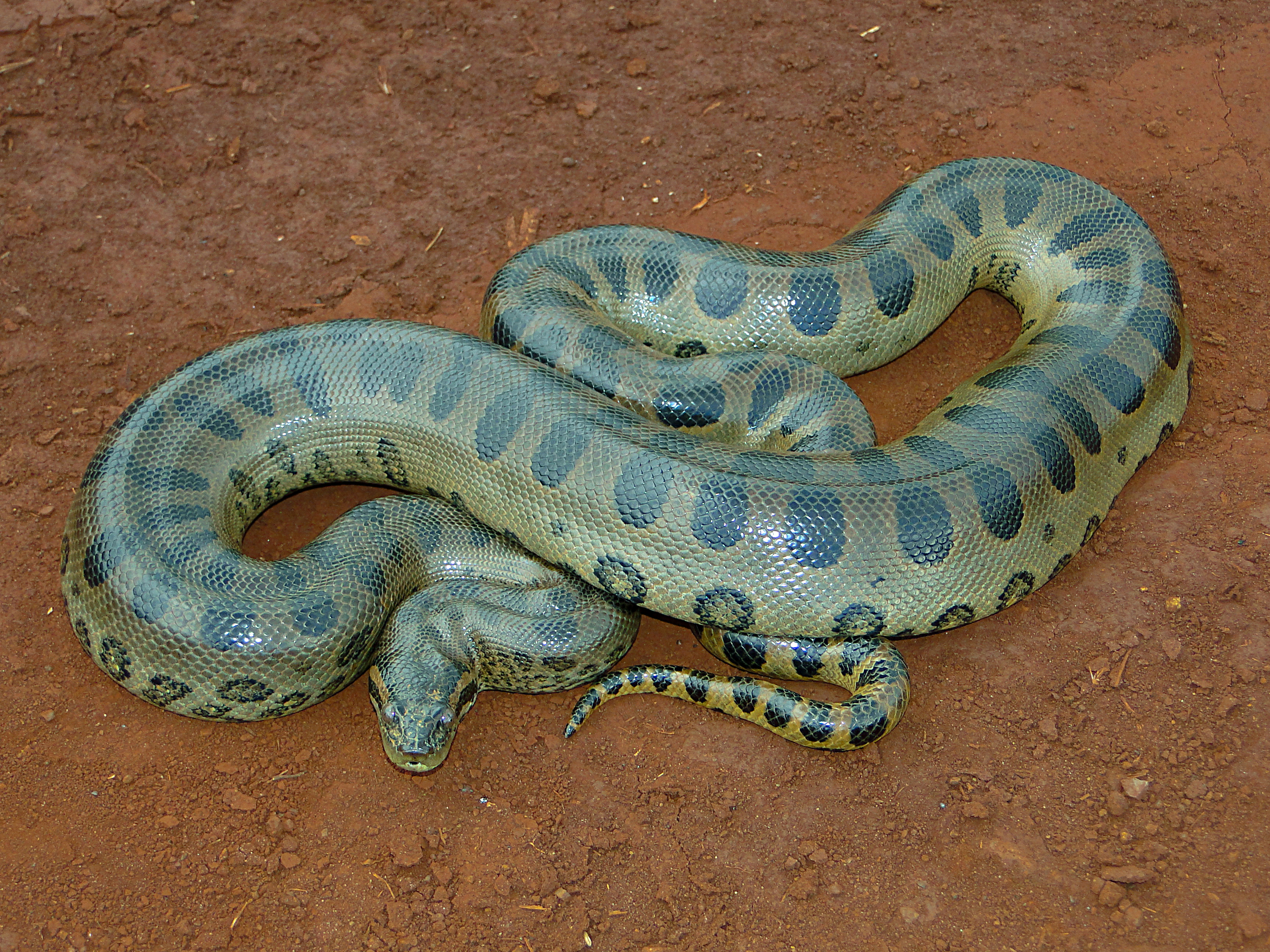
Eunectes type species; the green anaconda (E. murinus)

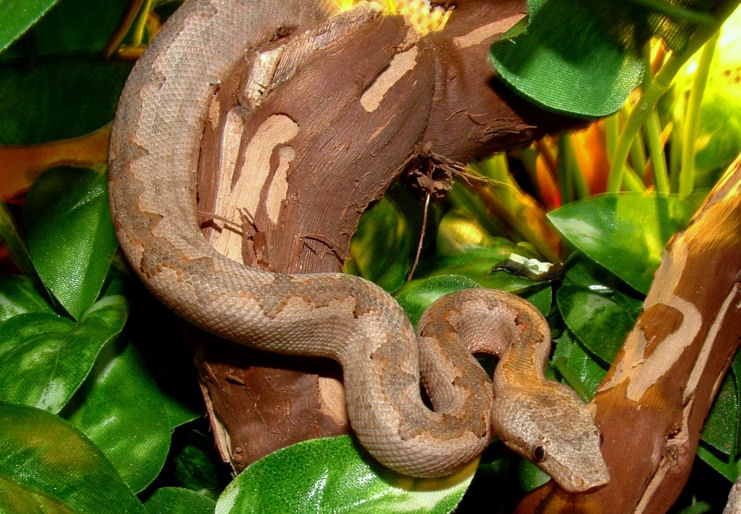
Candoia type species; the Pacific ground boa (C. carinata)

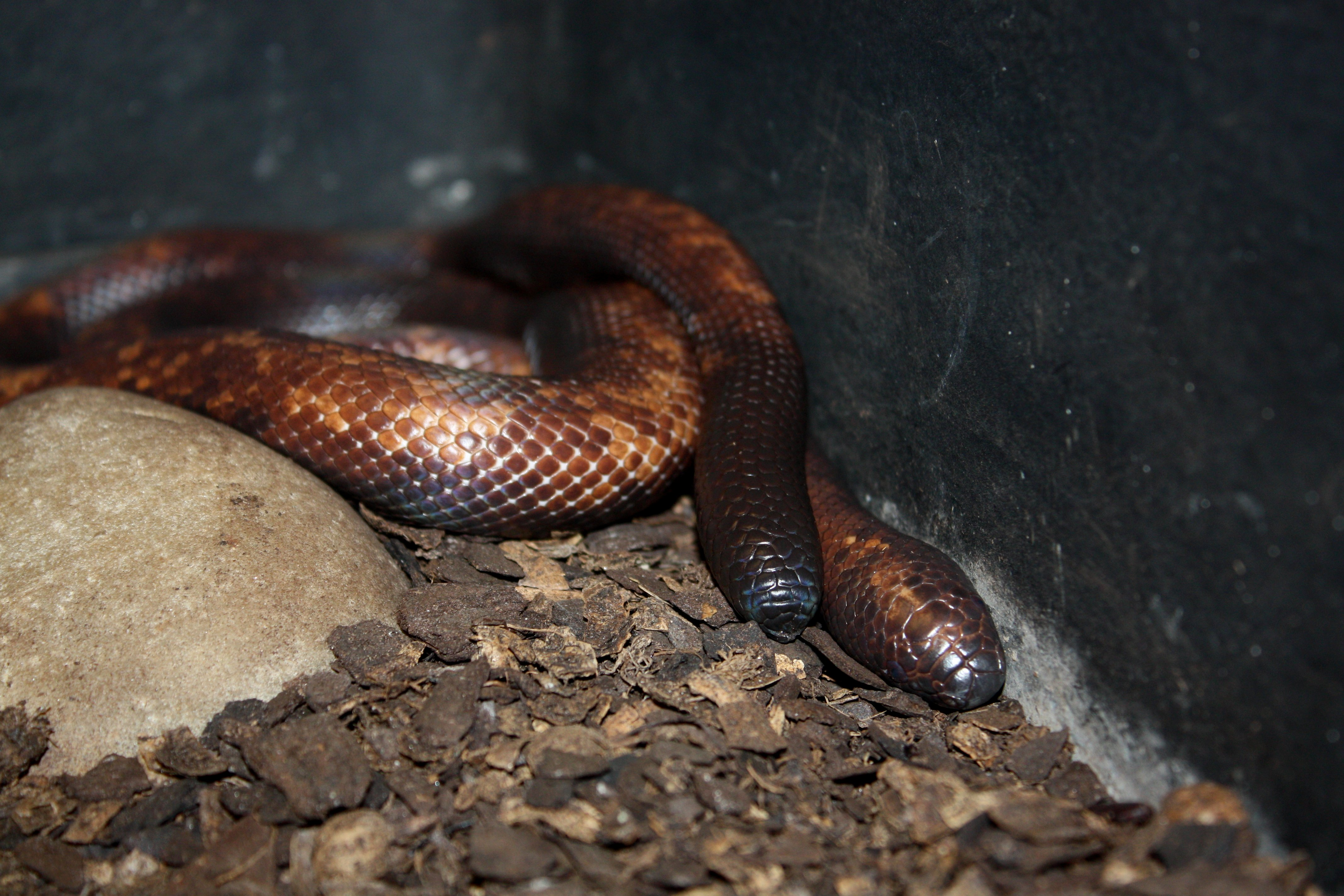
Calabaria type species; the Calabar python (C. reinhardtii)

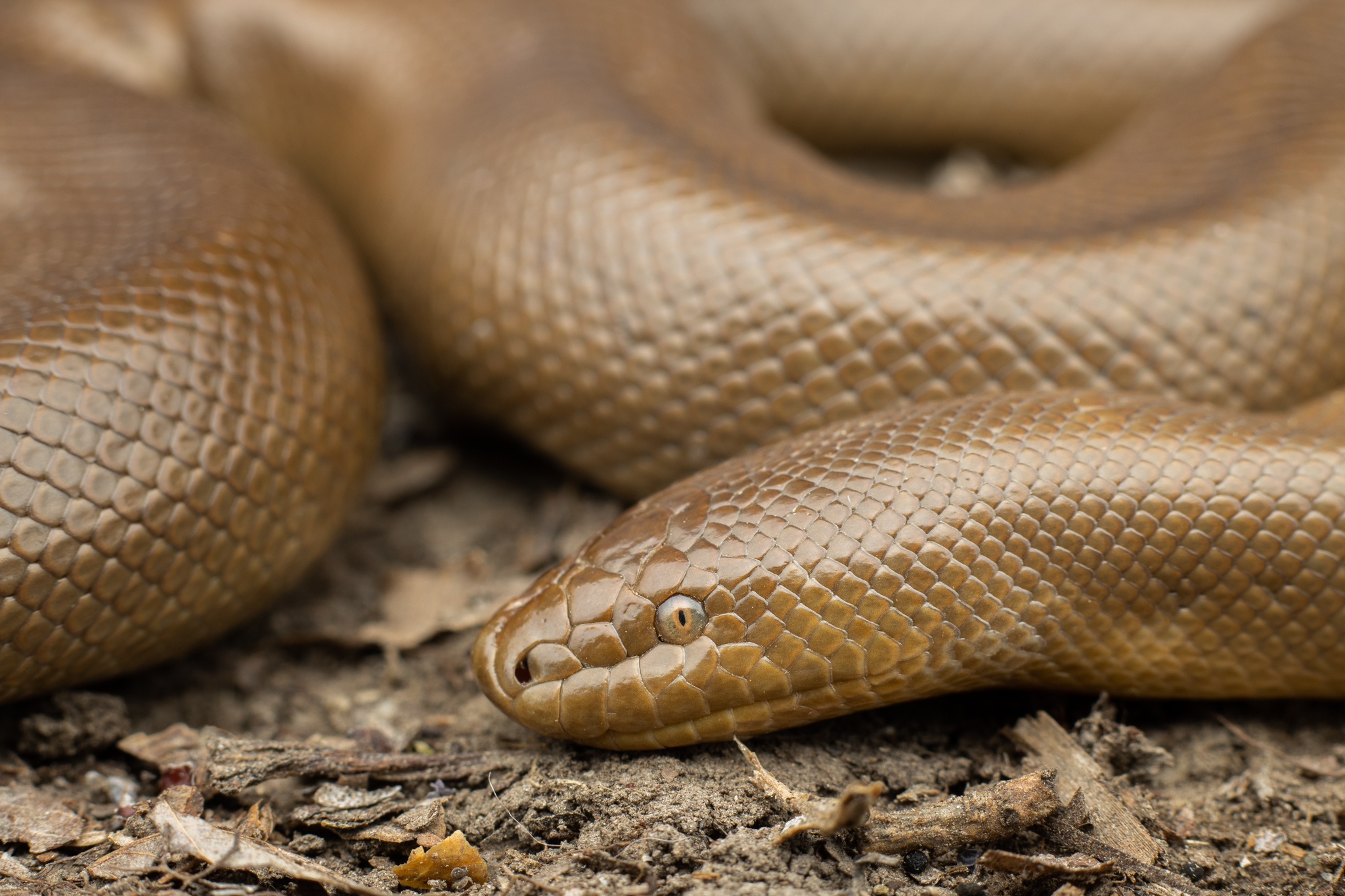
Charina type species; the northern rubber boa (C. bottae)

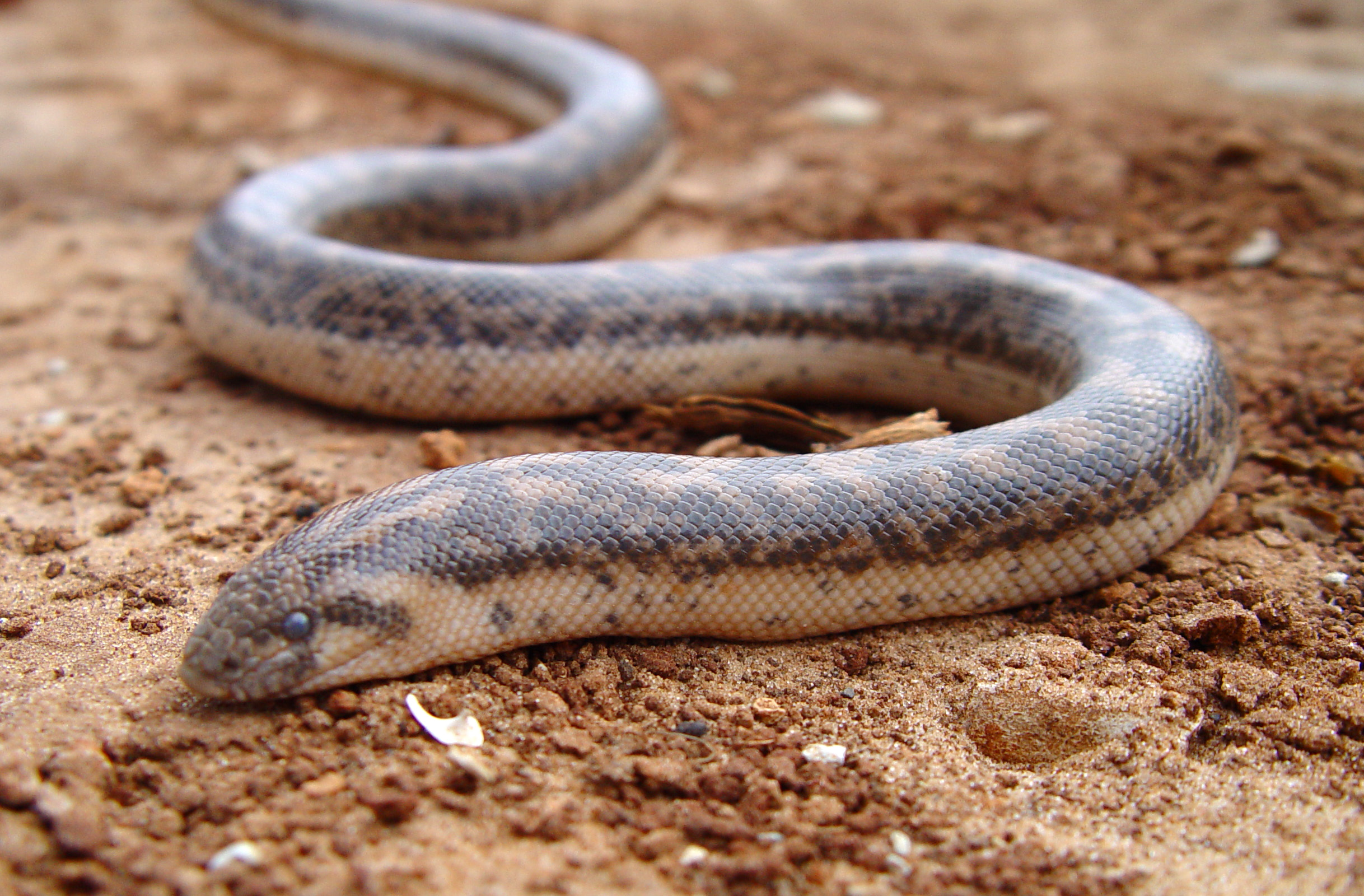
Eryx type species; the javelin sand boa (E. jaculus)

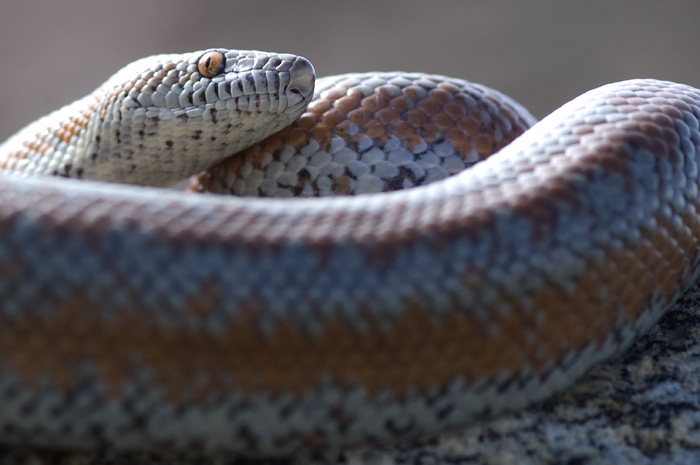
Lichanura type species; the desert rosy boa (L. trivirgata)

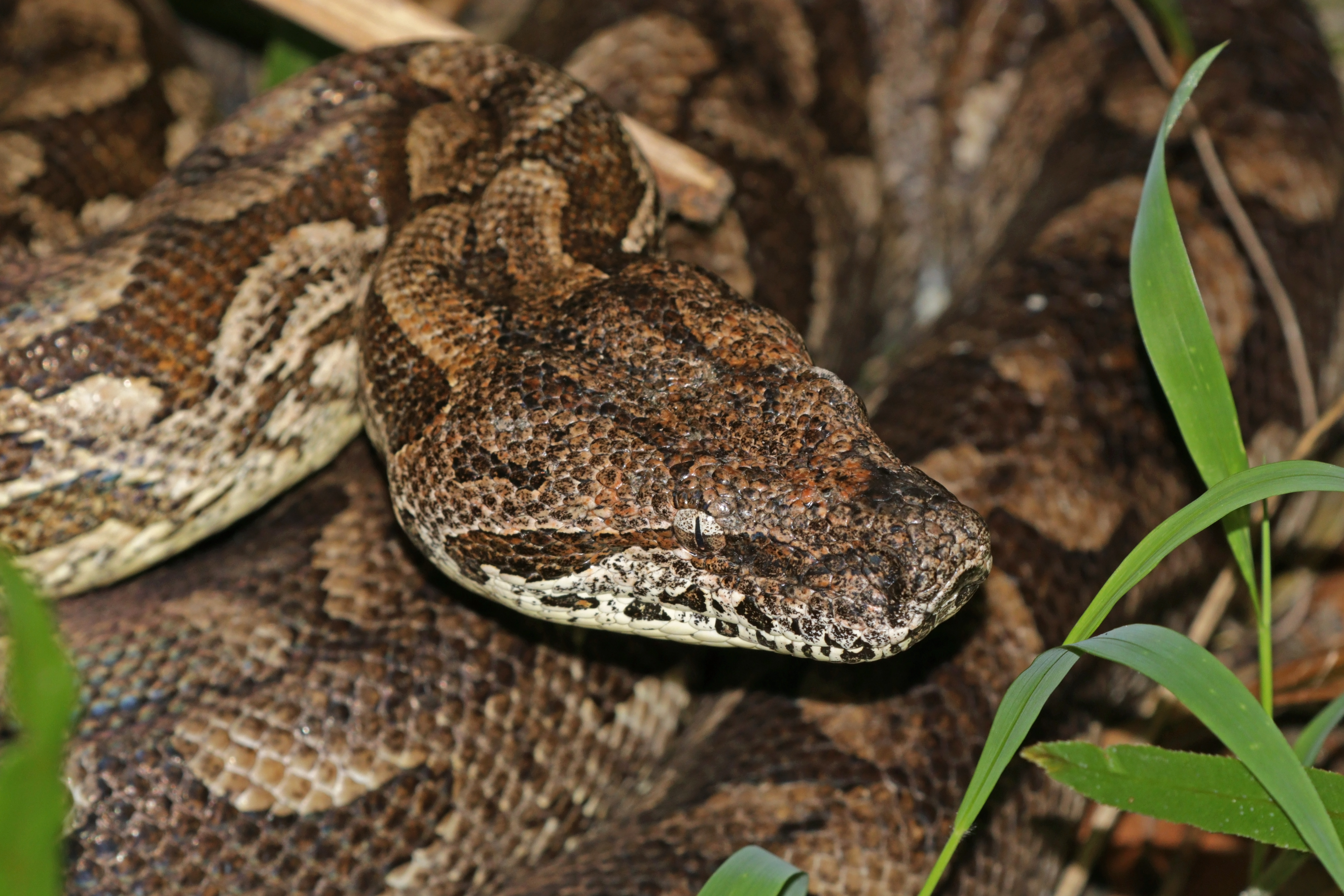
Acrantophis type species; Dumeril's boa (A. dumerili)

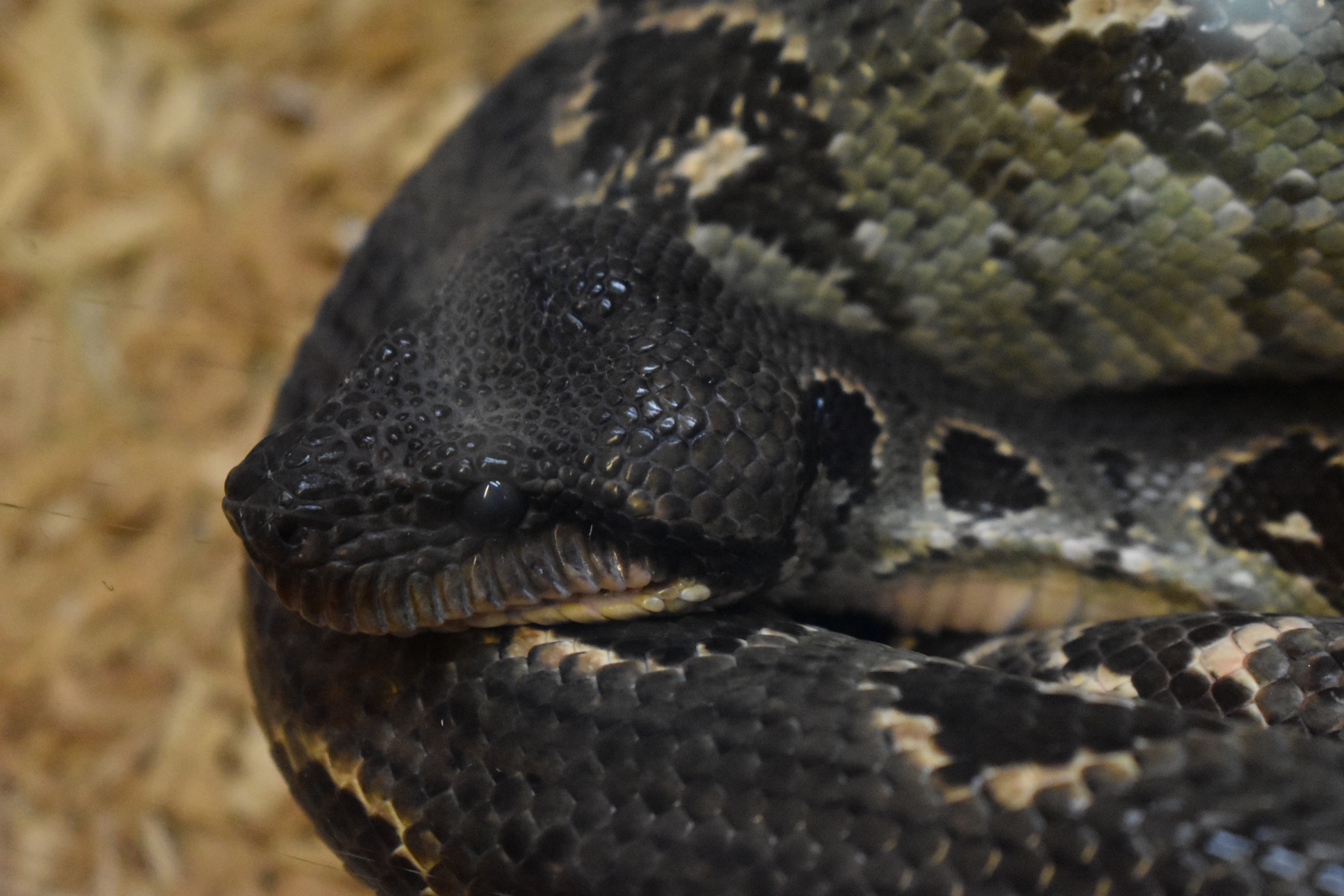
Sanzinia type species; the Madagascar tree boa (S. madagascariensis)

== See also ==
- List of boine species and subspecies
- List of erycine species and subspecies
- List of largest snakes
