= List of boine species and subspecies =

This is a list of all extant genera, species and subspecies of the snakes of the subfamily Boinae, otherwise referred to as boines or true boas. It follows the taxonomy currently provided by ITIS, which is based on the continuing work of Roy McDiarmid.

- Boa, true boas sensu stricto
  - Boa constrictor, boa constrictor or red-tailed boa
    - Boa constrictor constrictor, red-tailed boa constrictor or red-tailed boa
    - Boa constrictor longicauda, long-tailed boa constrictor or long-tailed boa
    - Boa constrictor occidentalis, Argentine boa constrictor or Argentine boa (also known locally as ampalagua, lampalagua or boa de las vizcacheras)
    - Boa constrictor ortonii, Orton's boa constrictor or Orton's boa
  - Boa imperator, Central American boa, northern boa or Colombian boa
    - Boa imperator imperator, Central American boa, northern boa or Colombian boa
    - Boa imperator sabogae, Pearl Islands boa
  - Boa nebulosa, Dominican boa
  - Boa orophias, Saint Lucia boa
  - Boa sigma, Mexican west coast boa
- Chilabothrus, West Indian boas or Greater Antillean boas
  - Chilabothrus ampelophis
  - Chilabothrus angulifer, Cuban boa or Cuban tree boa
  - Chilabothrus argentum, Conception Bank silver boa, Conception Bank boa or silver boa
  - Chilabothrus chrysogaster, Turks and Caicos Islands boa or Southern Bahamas boa
    - Chilabothrus chrysogaster chrysogaster, Turks and Caicos Islands boa
    - Chliabothrus chrysogaster relicquus, Great Inagua boa
  - Chilabothrus exsul, Abaco Islands boa or Northern Bahamas boa
  - Chilabothrus fordii, Ford's boa or Hispaniolan desert boa
    - Chilabothrus fordii agametus, Môle Saint Nicholas boa
    - Chilabothrus fordii fordii, Ford's boa or Hispaniolan desert boa
    - Chilabothrus fordii manototus, Île à Caprit boa
  - Chilabothrus gracilis, Hispaniolan vine boa
    - Chilabothrus gracilis gracilis, Dominican Republic vine boa
    - Chilabothrus gracilis hapalus, Tiburon Peninsula vine boa
  - Chilabothrus granti, Virgin Islands boa
  - Chilabothrus inornatus, Puerto Rican boa
  - Chilabothrus monensis, Mona Island boa
  - Chilabothrus schwartzi, Crooked-Acklins boa
  - Chilabothrus striatus, Hispaniolan boa or Haitian boa
    - Chilabothrus striatus exagistus, Tiburon Peninsula boa
    - Chilabothrus striatus striatus, Hispaniolan red mountain boa or Dominican red mountain boa
    - Chilabothrus striatus warreni, Île de la Tortue boa
  - Chilabothrus strigilatus, Bahamian boa
    - Chilabothrus strigilatus ailurus, Cat Island boa
    - Chilabothrus strigilatus fosteri, Bimini boa
    - Chilabothrus strigilatus fowleri, Andros boa
    - Chilabothrus strigilatus mccraniei, Ragged Island boa
    - Chilabothrus strigilatus strigilatus, Bahamian boa
  - Chilabothrus subflavus, Jamaican boa, Jamaican yellow boa or yellow snake
- Corallus, neotropical tree boas
  - Corallus annulatus, annulated tree boa or ringed tree boa
    - Corallus annulatus annulatus, northern annulated tree boa or northern ringed tree boa
    - Corallus annulatus colombianus, Colombian annulated tree boa or Colombian ringed tree boa
  - Corallus batesii, Amazon Basin emerald tree boa
  - Corallus blombergi, Ecuadorian annulated tree boa or Blomberg's tree boa
  - Corallus caninus, emerald tree boa
  - Corallus cookii, Cook's tree boa
  - Corallus cropanii, Cropani's tree boa
  - Corallus grenadensis, Grenada tree boa or Grenada Bank tree boa
  - Corallus hortulanus, Amazon tree boa, garden tree boa or macabrel
  - Corallus ruschenbergerii, Central American tree boa or Trinidad tree boa
- Epicrates, rainbow boas
  - Epicrates alvarezi, Argentinian rainbow boa
  - Epicrates assisi, Caatinga rainbow boa
  - Epicrates cenchria, rainbow boa
    - Epicrates cenchria barbouri, Marajo Island rainbow boa
    - Epicrates cenchria cenchria, Brazilian rainbow boa
    - Epicrates cenchria gaigei, Peruvian rainbow boa
    - Epicrates cenchria hygrophilus, Espirito Santo rainbow boa
    - Epicrates cenchria polylepis, Central Highlands rainbow boa
  - Epicrates crassus, Paraguayan rainbow boa
  - Epicrates maurus, brown rainbow boa
- Eunectes, anacondas
  - Eunectes beniensis, Bolivian anaconda or Beni anaconda
  - Eunectes deschauenseei, dark-spotted anaconda or De Schauensee's anaconda
  - Eunectes murinus, green anaconda
  - Eunectes notaeus, yellow anaconda

== See also ==
- List of erycine species and subspecies
