= Metro Richmond Zoo =

Zoo in Chesterfield County, Virginia, US

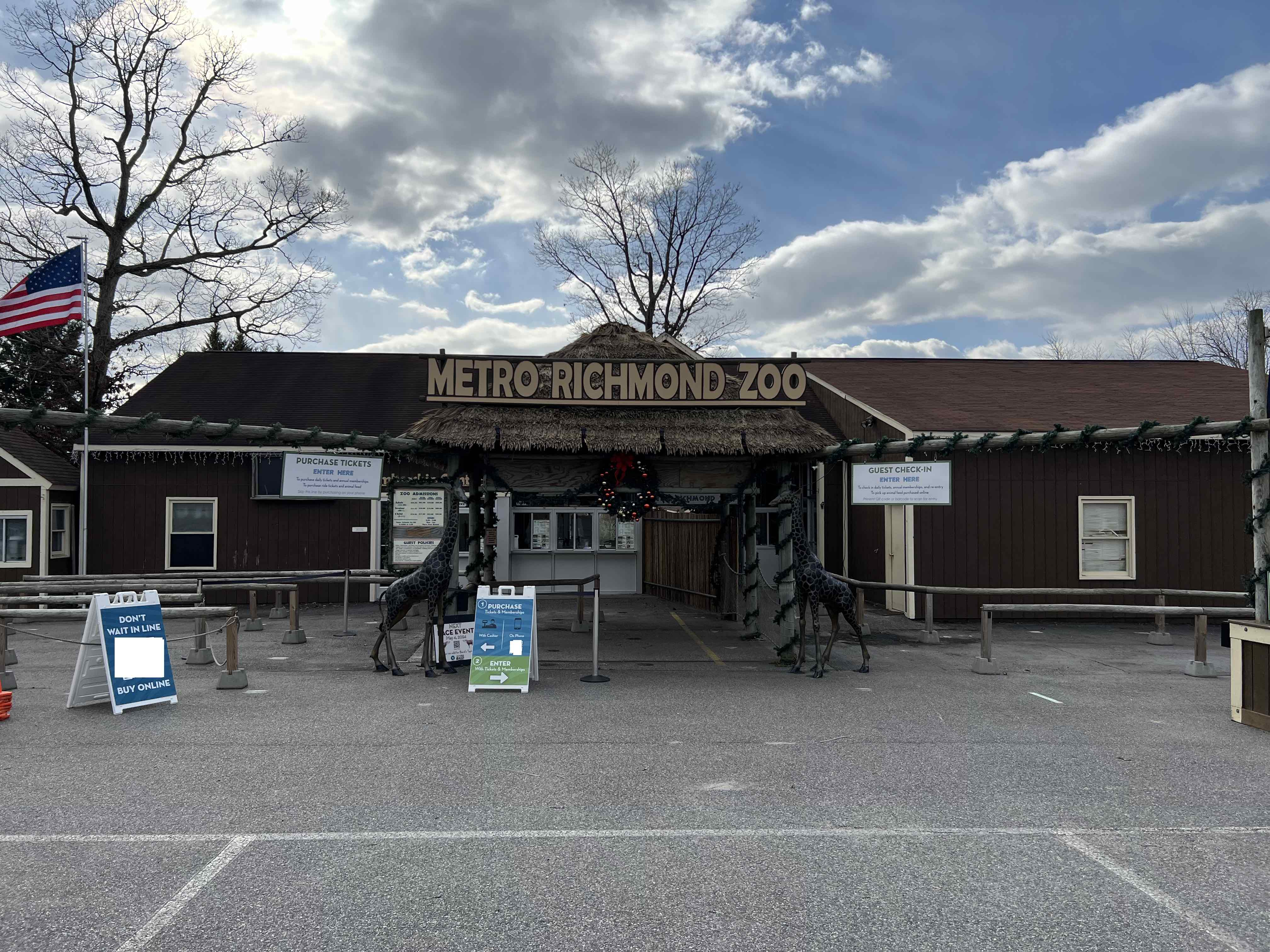
- Front entrance to Metro Richmond Zoo, 2024.
- Interactive map of Metro Richmond Zoo
- 37.3818°N 77.7674°W
- Date opened: April 22, 1995
- Location: Moseley, Chesterfield County, Virginia
- Land area: 70 acres (28 ha)
- No. of animals: 2000
- No. of species: 190+
- Memberships: ZAA
- Director: Jim Andelin
- Website: www.metrorichmondzoo.com

Metro Richmond Zoo is a privately owned, for-profit zoo in Chesterfield County, Virginia. It is located in the central Virginia area, off of U.S. Route 360 (Hull Street Road), about 20 miles southwest of Richmond. Metro Richmond Zoo encompasses about 70 acres (28 ha) and houses around 2,000 animals representing over 190 species, including reticulated giraffe, white rhinoceros, snow leopard, cheetah and Grant's zebra.

The zoo is accredited by the Zoological Association of America (ZAA), and has one of the largest primate collections in the United States.

== History ==
The zoo opened to the public on April 22, 1995, and was home to 167 animals of 15 species at the time.

2003 was the opening year of the zoo's safari sky ride, a fifteen-minute ride that gives visitors a high view of much of the zoo and the year the North American area of the zoo opened. 2006 was the opening year for the Jungle Carousel, and Kiddie Rides. 2008 saw the debut of a $250,000 expansion featuring a safari-like ride through a new 8-acre (32,000 m^{2}) animal enclosure, with visitors in a two-car "train". In fall 2013, the zoo installed treetop Zoofari, a zipline and adventure park located outside of the zoo entrance. In 2019, the zoo introduced a drop tower ride where visitors travel up to 30 ft.

Following the COVID-19 pandemic in 2020, the zoo was closed in March. From May 7 to June 13, 2020, the zoo reopened as a drive thru tour, where visitors can bring in their private vehicles to ride through the pathway. The zoo later reopened to visitors for walking, but the drive-thru tours operated again from December 7, 2020, to February 27, 2021.

== Attractions ==
- Penguin Falls Drop and Twist Tower
- Safari Sky Ride
- Jungle Carousel
- Safari Train Ride
- Kids' Playground Area
- Treetop Zoofari Zipline and Adventure Park

== Animals and exhibits ==
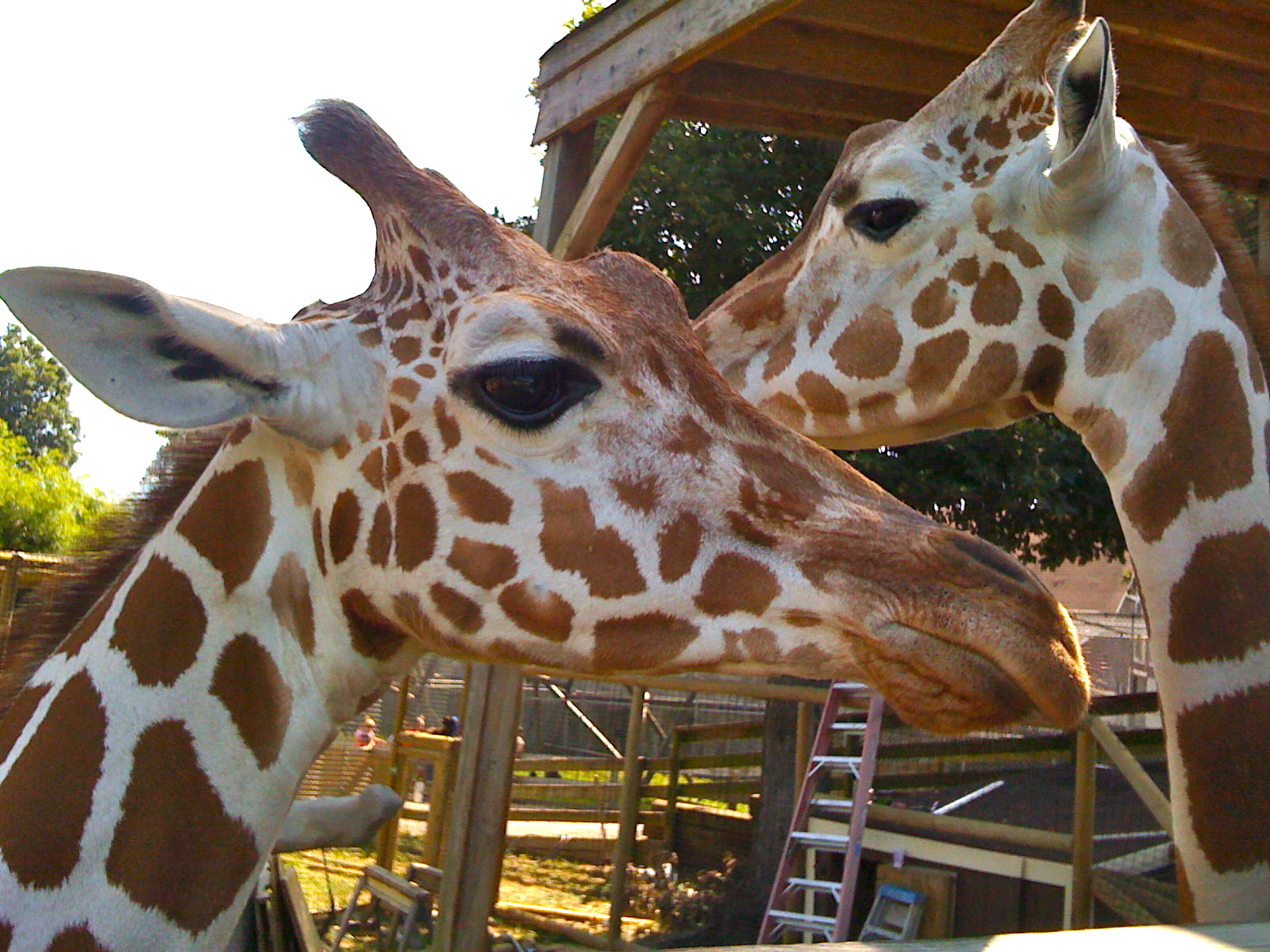
Giraffes in Metro Richmond Zoo

The Metro Richmond Zoo is noted for giraffe-feeding opportunities. Visitors can purchase zoo treats for giraffe feeding. The zoo houses a herd of nine reticulated giraffe and a single Masai giraffe, kept in a yard across from the main giraffe exhibit along with another reticulated giraffe. Animals residing with the giraffes include eastern bongo, kudu, Stanley crane, and crowned crane. Visitors can also purchase zoo treats for deer, goats, sheep, donkeys, and young antelope in the children's farm. Some of the larger animals can be fed zoo treats via tubes that reach to their feeding troughs. Those animals are dromedaries, Bactrian camels, elk, American bison, and warthog.

The North American area of the zoo is home to elk, bison, wolves, Steller's sea eagles, skunks, mouflons, fallow deers, and alligators.

There are enclosures for raccoons, binturongs and Indian crested porcupines as well as an exhibit for red kangaroos, emus, and common wallaroos.

2004 saw the opening of a walk-through aviary near the zoo entrance containing roseate spoonbill, demoiselle crane, sacred ibis, and multiple species of waterfowl such as yellow-billed duck, Mandarin duck, paradise shelduck, ringed teal, common shelduck, rosybill and red-crested pochard. The aviary also houses golden pheasants, Lady Amherst's pheasants and Swinhoe's pheasants. Adjacent to the aviary is a flock of Chilean flamingos. Also near the avairy are enclosures for prairie dogs, and fennec foxes.

The safari ride enclosure includes gemsbok, waterbuck, greater kudu, eland, lowland nyala, Thomson's gazelle, Scimitar oryx, Baird's tapir, and ostrich.

Adjacent to the safari enclosure is a large wooded valley viewable only from the safari train and a small viewing deck. Four species of ungulates native to India and China reside in this exhibit. They are blackbuck, Himalayan tahr, and takin. The Metro Richmond Zoo is one of the few zoos in the United States to have takin on display, as it is considered a national treasure in China and receives the same protection as the giant panda. On June 6, 2017, five markhors were added to the exhibit.

Near the station where the visitors get on the zoo train is an African penguin exhibit where visitors can view an educational penguin feeding program twice daily. The zoo is also the home of the oldest African penguin in the world, ET, who is currently 42 years old. Around the penguin exhibit are enclosures containing the camels, and nearby is a South American exhibit containing specimens such as Brazilian tapir, greater rhea, giant anteater, capybara, llama, alpaca, king vulture, toucans, and new world primates, along with crested fireback and southern white-faced scops owl. A bat house is adjacent to the king vulture enclosure, and contains Indian flying fox, straw-colored fruit bat, two-toed sloth, and prehensile-tailed porcupine. Nearby is an aviary containing blue-and-yellow macaws, salmon-crested cockatoos, red-crowned amazons, crested screamers, Reeves's pheasants, and a grey parrot.

Another aviary contains about 400 Budgerigars. The zoo offers seed-coated Popsicle sticks that visitors can purchase to attract the birds to perch and feed in the aviary.

New arrivals in 2010 and 2011 were golden pheasant, white-faced saki, Kirk's dik-dik, steenbok, great white pelican, marabou stork, Himalayan tahr, yellow-backed duiker, toco toucan, red-billed toucan, black howler monkey, crested screamer, Reeve's pheasant, and Allen's swamp monkey. More exhibits are currently being built, including a large reptile and small mammal building near the zoo entrance, and many small enclosures around the safari paddock.

Early 2013 saw the opening of a new meerkat enclosure alongside the under construction reptile and small mammal building. In late March 2013, a new jungle gym for children to play in was built next door the safari skyride. In mid-April 2013, a Baird's tapir and a Ruppell's griffon vulture were added to the zoo, and can be seen in a safari-ride preserve area. In 2015, phase 1 of the Reptile Building opened to the public to view various reptiles and amphibians, including the Komodo dragon. In August 2016, a new serval exhibit opened adjacent to the bat exhibit. On June 26, the reptile house was expanded with a new hallway containing 13 additional exhibits for 15 new species including rhino iguanas, rhino rat snakes, Madagascar tree boas, prehensile-tailed skinks, Dominican mountain boas, veiled chameleons, and emerald tree boas. Later this year, two new primate islands similar to the existing ones holding chimpanzees and orangutans were made to be viewed from the Safari Train Ride.

In October 2013, five cheetah cubs were born to parents Lana and Kitu. The cubs quickly gained global attention because they were only the third litter born in the U.S. in 2013. They were named after Virginia counties and cities: Richie (Richmond), Rico (Henrico), Chester (Chesterfield), Amelia (Amelia), and Hanna (Hanover).

In 2015, the zoo received attention for Kumbali and Kago, a cheetah cub and rescue puppy that were paired and became friends when Kumbali was removed from his mother who was not producing enough milk.

In summer 2018, the zoo debuted a pair of pygmy hippopotamuses to their collection. In January 2019 the zoo debuted a pair of young Steller's sea eagles to their collection. They temporarily resided in what used to be where the black-and-white ruffed lemurs were, while their bigger exhibit was being constructed.

In June 2020, the new exhibit for Cape clawless otters called "Otter Cove" opened next to the pygmy hippo exhibit. In October 2020, the zoo debuted a pair of gray wolves to their collection. They reside in what used to be where the white-tailed deer were. In fall 2020, the new bigger expanded exhibit for Steller's sea eagles opened nearby the wolf exhibit.

In 2023, a pair of Eurasian eagle owls were moved on exhibit next to the sea eagles, and a year later, new exhibits for red ruffed lemurs, black-and-white ruffed lemurs, and ring-tailed lemurs opened by the blackbuck and tahr exhibit. Inside the former cape clawless otter exhibit are some rock hyraxes.

The zoo allows Indian peafowl, bar-headed geese, barnacle geese, Egyptian geese, and West Indian whistling ducks to roam freely among the visitors. The zoo is also a rest stop for wild Virginia-native waterfowl such as wood duck, mallards and Canada geese.

=== Primates ===
The zoo has one of the largest collections of primates in the United States, with more than 200 individuals representing 30 species, such as Sulawesi macaque, chimpanzee, Diana monkey, orangutan, cotton-top tamarin, red-handed tamarin, black-handed spider monkey, gibbon, lesser spot-nosed monkey, coppery titi monkey, eastern black-and-white colobus, ring-tailed lemur, red ruffed lemur, siamang, and black-and-white ruffed lemur . The zoo has a Diana monkey breeding program.

In late-July 2012, the zoo opened an enclosure that houses Farley and Zoe, two juvenile orangutans. Guests can interact and come face-to-face with Farley and Zoe through glass windows. On March 2, 2021, the pair had a male baby, named Taavi. Another organgutan at Tasha may act as a surrogate mother. Adjacent to the orangutans are a pair of white handed gibbons.

== Miracle of Christmas live at the zoo ==
Every year since 2003, the Metro Richmond Zoo hosts a Christmas pageant on December 21, 22, and 23. The zoo is decorated with thousands of Christmas lights, wreaths, and trees. The fifteen-minute outdoor pageant celebrates the birth of Jesus Christ. The Miracle of Christmas also features live animals from the zoo.

== Research projects and conservation efforts ==
Metro Richmond Zoo participates in several scientific research and wildlife conservation projects. The zoo also plays a key part in addax and eastern bongo conservation. The bongo herd has had several calves born in the past several years and many of the addax born at the zoo have been released to the wild. Other threatened and endangered animals living here include the Asian black bear, Bengal tiger, Galapagos giant tortoise, and black-and-white ruffed lemur.

== See also ==
- List of zoos
