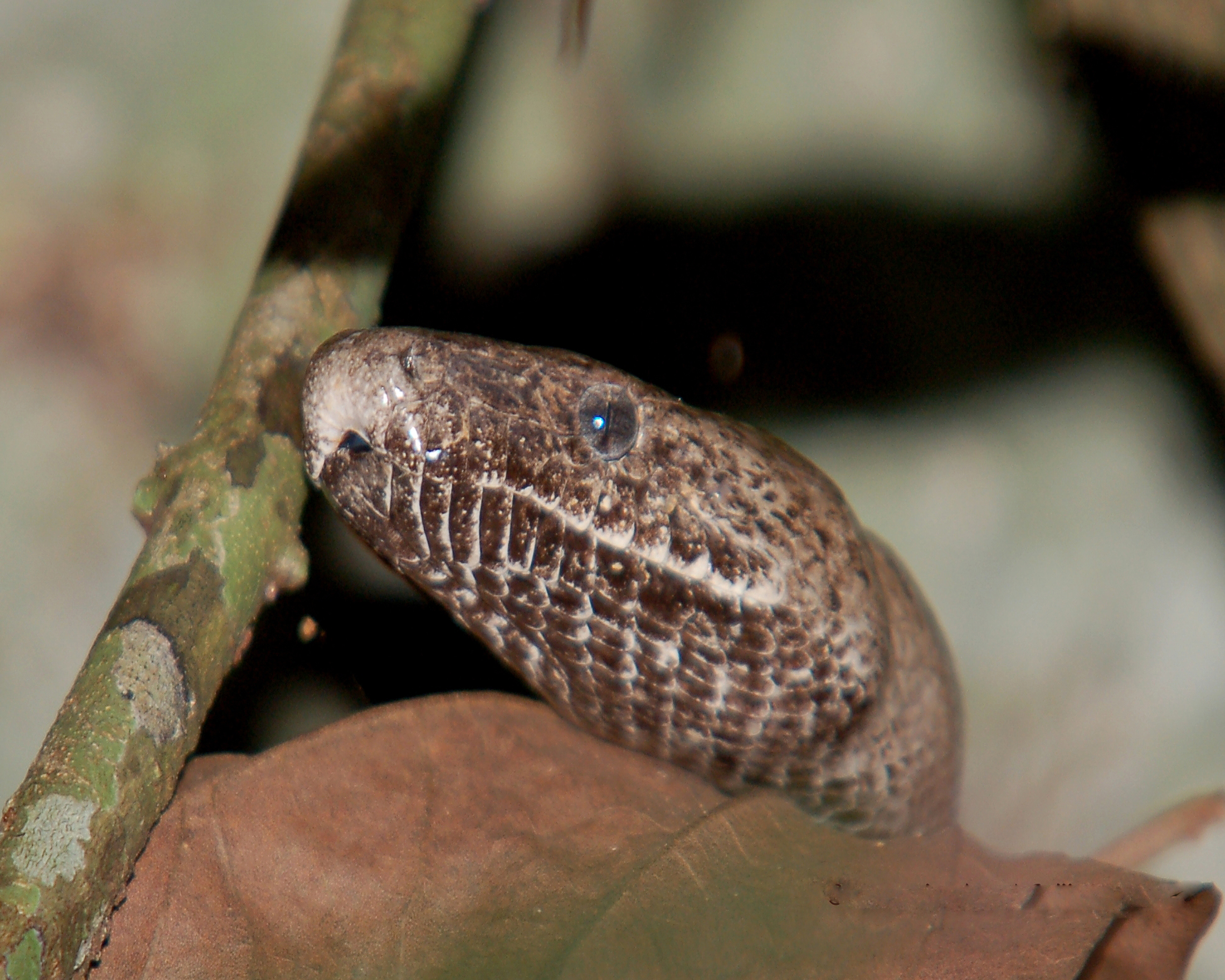
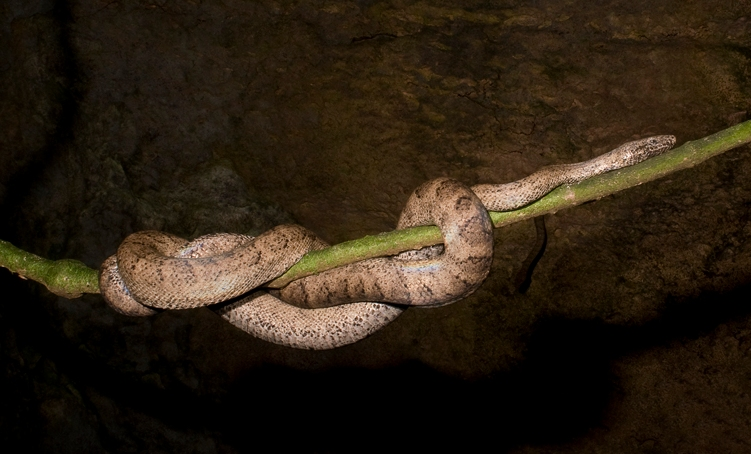
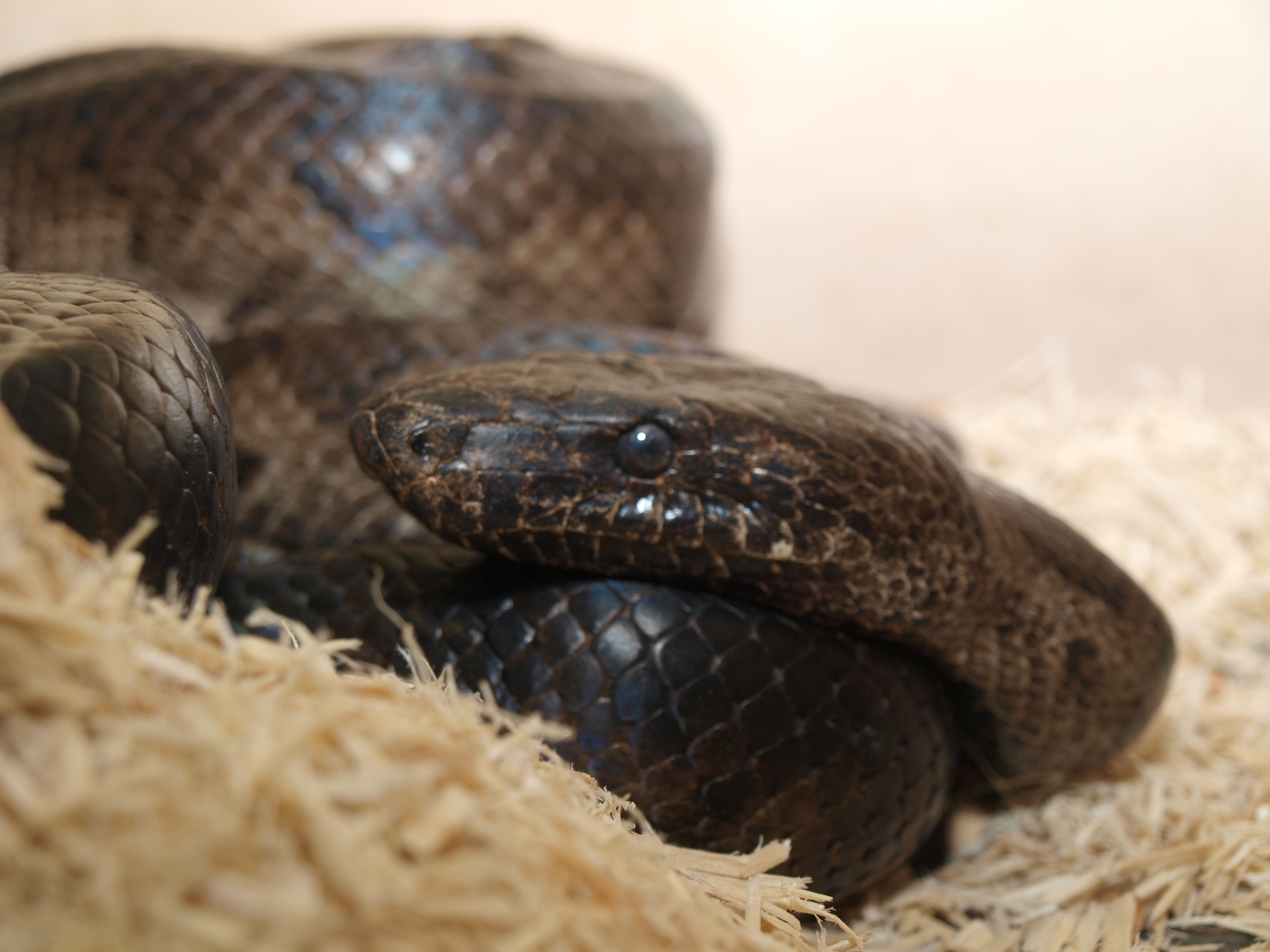
- U.S. Fish and Wild Service, 2011

Conservation status
- Least Concern (IUCN 3.1)
- CITES Appendix I

Scientific classification
- Kingdom: Animalia
- Phylum: Chordata
- Class: Reptilia
- Order: Squamata
- Suborder: Serpentes
- Family: Boidae
- Genus: Chilabothrus
- Species: C. inornatus

Binomial name
- Chilabothrus inornatus (Reinhardt, 1843)

Synonyms
- Boa inornata Reinhardt, 1843; Chilabothrus inornatus Duméril & Bibron, 1844; Piesigaster boettgeri Seoane, 1880; Epicrates inornatus (Reinhardt, 1843) Boulenger, 1893; Boella tenella H.M. Smith & Chiszar, 1992

= Puerto Rican boa =

Species of reptile

The Puerto Rican boa (Chilabothrus inornatus), most commonly known as Culebrón ("big snake"), is a large species of boa endemic to Puerto Rico. It is a terrestrial and arboreal snake with a pale brown to dark brown coloration. It grows to 1.9 m (6.2 ft) in length. It feeds on small mammals such as rodents and bats, birds and sometimes anole lizards. Like most boas, it is viviparous (bearing live young) and kills its prey using constriction.

== Taxonomy ==
It is extremely similar to the Jamaican boa (Chilabothrus subflavus) which was seen as conspecific for some fifty years until they were split in 1901 by Leonhard Hess Stejneger.

The taxon Piesigaster boettgeri was described from Mindanao in the Philippines, by the Spaniard es:Víctor López Seoane in 1881, but was identified as a synonym of this species by Stejneger. Seoane's brother was an officer in the Spanish Navy and thus the localities of the group of specimens Seoane had obtained were confused during their passage to Spain.

Although it has been known under the name E. inornatus for over a century, having been moved to the genus Epicrates (which had been created in 1830 by Johann Georg Wagler) by the Belgian zoologist George Albert Boulenger in 1893 when cataloguing the specimens in the Natural History Museum, London, a number of authors decided to it move to Chilabothrus inornatus in 2013. It had first been moved to Chilabothrus inornatus from the genus Boa in 1844 by either the French herpetologists André Marie Constant Duméril and Gabriel Bibron, or the Italian snake expert Giorgio Jan, only a year after it had been described in that genus by the Dane Johannes Theodor Reinhardt in 1843. Reinhardt had three snakes of this species to study for his description, these are the syntypes and are stored in Copenhagen. They were collected by a certain Dr. Ravn from Puerto Rico. It is often still known as Epicrates inornatus in many publications.

=== Etymology ===
The specific epithet inornatus is from the Latin negation of ornatus, meaning 'adorned', thus the boa is 'unadorned'.

== Description ==
A characteristic of the species is the irregular parietal scales. It can grow to some 1.9 m (6.2 ft), with 261 to 271 ventral scales and 67 to 75 caudal scales, according to Stejneger in 1904, who only knew of at least twelve specimens at the time. The colours of the three live specimens he knew of were variable; two he describes as "bistre" (deep, dark, grayish brown), the other as "chestnut" with a darker colour near the tail, the first had a darker ventral surface, the second he describes as "slate" coloured, and the last had a lighter slate-brown underside with the ventral scales having paler edges. The first was patterned with seventy to eighty indistinct dusky cross bars consisting of a row of spots, these cross bars increasing in width to the end of the snake; in the second these patterns were much more distinct, with the crossbars having pale centres but being outlined in blackish colour, the lateral spots being so aligned as to form a blackish line in the front third of its body, but in the last snake there was little evidence of patterning with only a few scattered and obscure darkish spots on its sides. The iris he describes as "silvery gray clouded with dusky".

It grows to 1.8–2.7 m (5.9–8.9 ft) in total length.

=== Similar species ===
It is the largest snake on the island; other sympatric snake species include Alsophis portoricensis, Arrhyton exiguum and very small blindsnakes of the genus Typhlops. The only other species of Epicrates in the area is Chilabothrus monensis, on Mona Island.

== Distribution ==
The Puerto Rican boa is endemic to Puerto Rico.

== Ecology ==
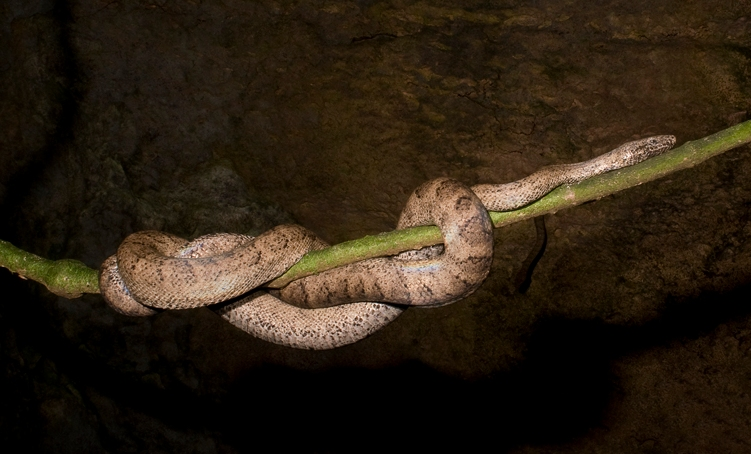
Puerto Rican boa

=== Habitat ===
It is found in wooded and rocky places in the foothills. It is more common in the northwest and in the karst regions which are found along the northern coast of the island.

=== Diet ===
The boa feeds by seizing the prey in its jaws, wrapping several coils around it, and then constricting until the prey has suffocated. The prey is then swallowed headfirst. The feeding habits of the very young are unknown. However, locals claim they eat small lizards, other small vertebrates and some insects.

This species is a sit-and-wait predator as opposed to an active hunter of prey. It is a nocturnal, terrestrial hunter which is not found often in trees. The dissections of 72 snakes from the West Indies show that while young boas of the genus Epicrates feed primarily on anoles, mature boas (with the exception of Epicrates gracilis) feed for some 60% on mammals combined, which distinguishes them ecologically from the other three genera of snakes on the island. Birds constitute some 10% of the diet. The rest of the prey items are composed of Anolis lizards and a very small number of frogs. They also prey on much larger-sized prey than the other snakes. Half of the mammals are non-native species of mice (Mus) and rats (Rattus), it is suspected that the original prey was other small mammals such as Nesophontes, Brotomys and Isolobodon before the introduction of these species. Bats constitute the other half. Newborn snakes may possibly feed on geckos. It is thought that this species in particular feeds less on anoles and more on birds, rodents and bats.

Since the karst region where the Puerto Rican boa lives usually has many caves, the boa has the opportunity to feed on bats -a phenomenon which was previously seen in other Epicrates species. Observations in the 1980s revealed that boas capture the bats in flight by hanging at the opening of the cave, waiting until bats fly out of it. They then grab a bat with their jaws before killing it via constriction.

=== Reproduction ===
Pregnant females give birth to about 23-26 live boas.

== Predation ==
In Puerto Rico, Puerto Rican boas may be eaten by some growth stage of invasive boa constrictors.

== Conservation ==
Historic records, some dating back to the 18th century, indicate that during the first few centuries of Spanish colonization in Puerto Rico the boa was relatively abundant, and oil produced from the snake's fat was utilized extensively as an export (see snake oil). Impacts to the boa resulting from the oil trade were undoubtedly heightened by a concurrent reduction of habitat. Deforestation of the island began during this period and continued until, by the early 20th century, very little natural forest remained. Predation by the mongoose, introduced into Puerto Rico in the 19th century, has been postulated as a further cause for the boa's present status, but there is no direct evidence to support this idea.

In 1904 Stejneger mentions that during his time the snake was rather rare. He himself, as well as a number of other collecting parties in the territory newly acquired by the United States, were unable to see one during their expeditions on the island, although a trail of one was seen. Other collecting parties were able to collect five specimens in 1900 and in those first few years the island became a possession of the United States, and bring these to the mainland, almost doubling the specimens known at the time. In the previous century only six other specimens had been secured, these were all in Europe -one in Milan (used by Jan), one in Paris (studied by Duméril and Bibron from Bayamón, there was also a second specimen from Haiti, but this one is now thought to have been misidentified), two or more somewhere in Spain (those of Seoane supposedly from Mindanao), and the three original syntypes used by Reinhardt in Copenhagen.

After the invasion and annexation of the territory by the United States a few years before Stejneger and numerous other Americans were able to collect on the island, there was a subsequent economic decline due to the loss of traditional agricultural markets for sugar, and much of the forests have regrown on the island. There is an indication that the boa has recovered somewhat in recent years, although not to the degree that protective measures can be dropped. To prevent its extinction, a few conservation efforts have been attempted, including a conservation area for it in San Patricio State Forest in Puerto Rico.

== See also ==
- List of reptiles of Puerto Rico
- Fauna of Puerto Rico
- List of endemic fauna of Puerto Rico
