= George Henry Ford =

South African natural history illustrator

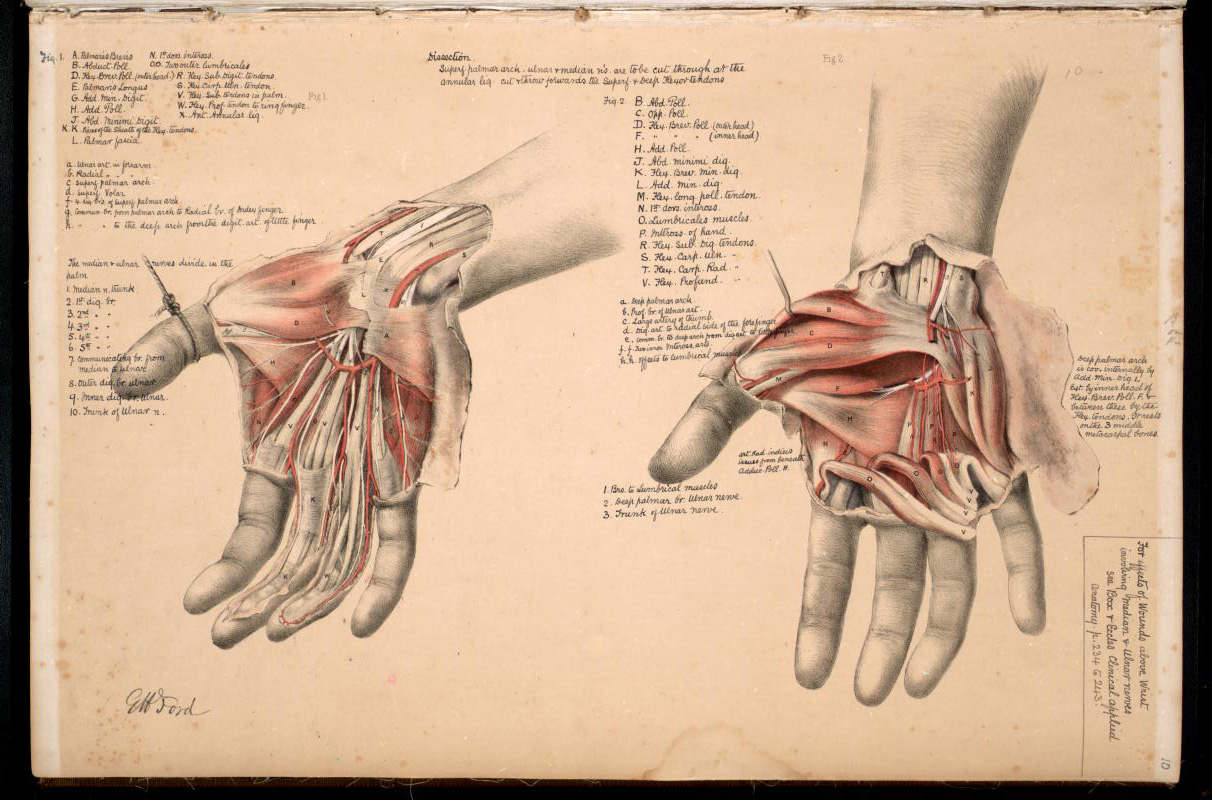
Plate from "Illustrations of dissections" (1867)

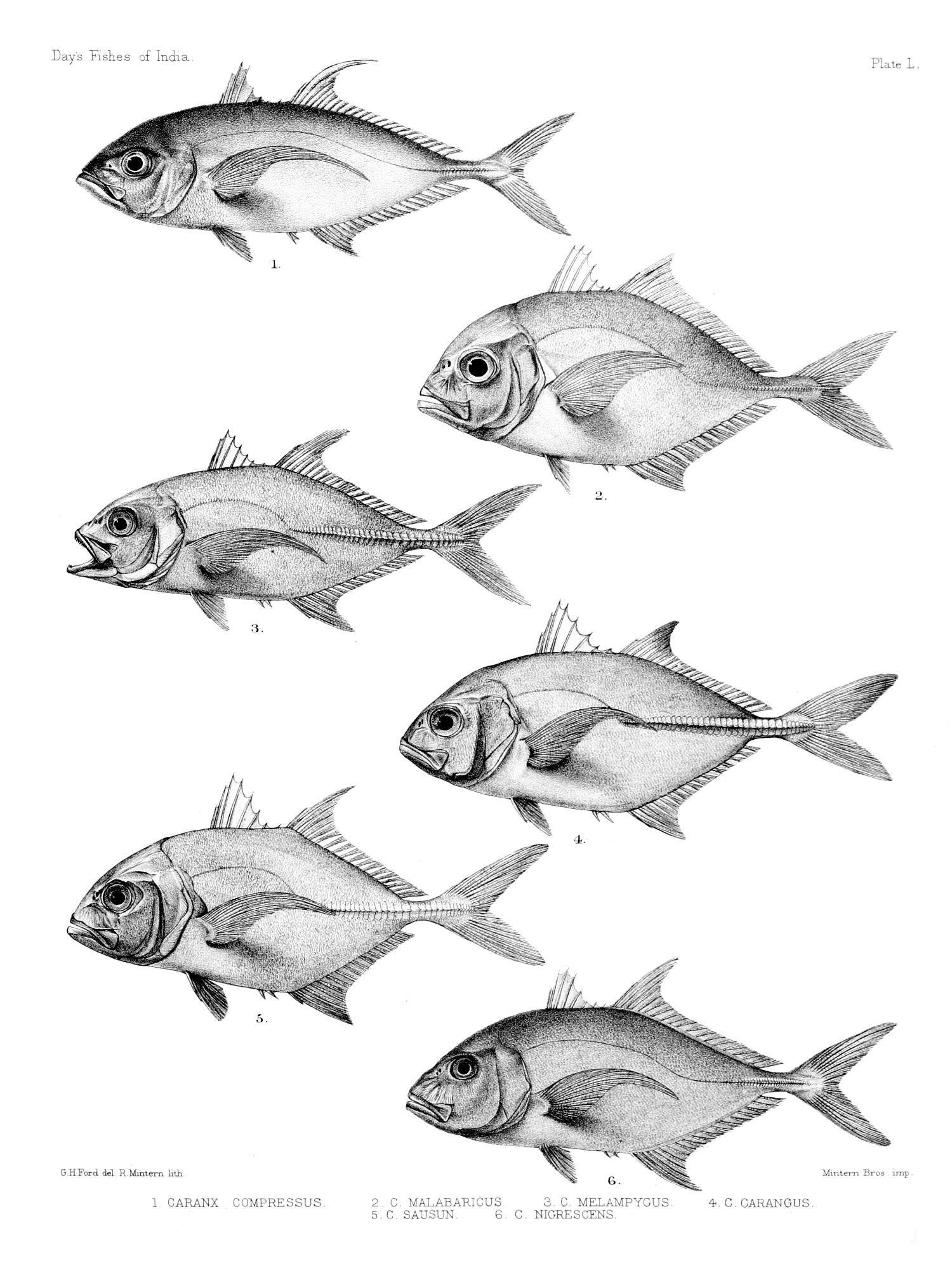
Plate from "The fishes of India" by Francis Day (1878)

George Henry Ford aka G. H. Ford (20 May 1808 in London – July 1876 in London), was a Cape Colony natural history illustrator who joined the British Museum in 1837. He portrayed animals and produced the plates in Sir Andrew Smith's Illustrations of the Zoology of South Africa.

Ford was the son of an English farmer in the Cape, James Edward Ford, who was himself a talented miniaturist. Capt. James Edward Ford, one of the 1820 Settlers, was born in England in 1770, and emigrated to South Africa, landing at Port Elizabeth in April 1820. The area allocated to the party lay midway between Bathurst and the Great Fish River mouth and was named Cuylerville after Col. Jacob Cuyler. Ford, his wife Frances Stransham, and their seven children were amongst 256 Settlers on the ship Chapman. The children were Frances Jane Ford 14, James Samuel Ford 13, George Henry Ford 11, Edward Stransham Ford 9, Adelaide Elizabeth Ford 8, Jane Murray Ford 6, and John Henry Ford 3.

Andrew Smith made the acquaintance of the Ford family in 1821 when he was visiting farmers, urging them to provide him with specimens of interest. Young George Ford was suffering from a broken hip inflicted by a cow, an injury which left him permanently crippled, prompting Smith to take him back to Cape Town. While convalescing there he was encouraged to paint and draw Smith's specimens. He proved to be so proficient that in 1825 Smith recommended him to the newly founded South African Museum in Cape Town, and later seconded him to the 1834–36 "Expedition for Exploring Central Africa". A report on this expedition was Illustrations of the zoology of South Africa, consisting chiefly of figures and descriptions of the objects of natural history collected during an expedition into the interior of South Africa, in the years 1834, 1835, and 1836.

When Smith returned to England in 1837, Ford accompanied him and soon found recognition for the quality of his work. He was employed at the British Museum and worked there with Smith who was finally driven away by the discomfort of the Bloomsbury semi-basement. Ford continued working under John Edward Gray, assistant to the Keeper of Zoology. Because of chronic backache, Ford eventually worked from the Surbiton home of Albert Günther who was to succeed Gray in 1875.

George Viner Ellis (1812-1900) succeeded to the Chair of Anatomy at University College London in 1850, and became one of the foremost anatomists of his time. This institution, in its first thirty-five years of existence, published a large number of anatomical atlases. Ellis and Ford used the relatively new technique of chromolithography for their imperial folio atlas of fifty-eight plates, Illustrations of Dissections in a Series of Original Coloured Plates the Size of Life. The plates were done between 1863 and 1867, with from four to seven completed each year. These plates are considered clear and accurate, with an aesthetic depiction of the cadavers, printed by the Mintern Bros., and published by James Walton.

Ford is commemorated in the scientific name of a species of Hispaniolan snake, Chilabothrus fordii (Ford's boa).
