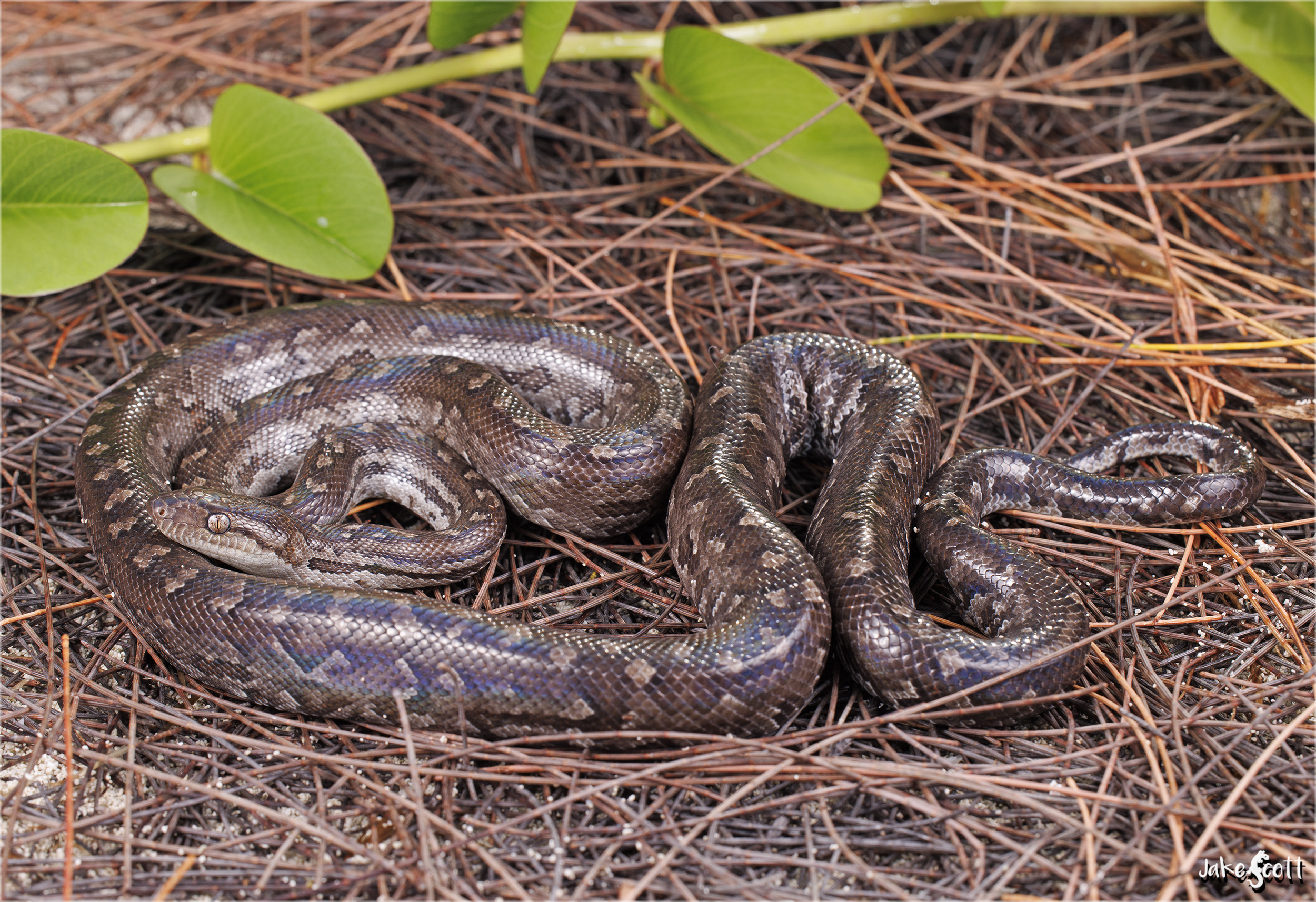

Conservation status
- Least Concern (IUCN 3.1)

Scientific classification
- Kingdom: Animalia
- Phylum: Chordata
- Class: Reptilia
- Order: Squamata
- Suborder: Serpentes
- Family: Boidae
- Genus: Chilabothrus
- Species: C. strigilatus

Binomial name
- Chilabothrus strigilatus (Cope, 1862)

Synonyms
- Homolachilus strigilatus Cope, 1862; Epicrates versicolor Steindachner, 1863; Epicrates strigilatus — Barbour, 1904; Chilabothrus strigilatus — Reynolds et al., 2013

= Chilabothrus strigilatus =

Species of snake

Chilabothrus strigilatus, also known commonly as the Bahamian boa, is a species of snake in the family Boidae. The species is endemic to the Bahamas. There are five recognized subspecies.

== Habitat ==
The preferred natural habitats of C. strigilatus are forest and shrubland, but it has also been found in gardens.

== Diet ==
Large adults of C. strigilatus prey upon both warm-blooded (birds, rodents) and cold-blooded (frogs, lizards) animals. Smaller adults and young prey predominately on lizards of the genus Anolis.

== Reproduction ==
C. strigilatus is viviparous and reproduces every other year.

== Subspecies ==
Five subspecies are recognized as being valid, including the nominate subspecies:

- Chilabothrus strigilatus strigilatus (Cope, 1862) – Bahamian boa – New Providence Island, including Rose Island, Eleuthera Island, Long Island and the Exuma Cays near Andros Island, the Bahamas
- Chilabothrus strigilatus ailurus Sheplan & Schwartz, 1974 – Cat Island boa – Cat Island and Alligator Cay, the Bahamas
- Chliabothrus strigilatus fosteri Barbour, 1941 – Bimini boa – Bimini Island, the Bahamas
- Chilabothrus strigilatus fowleri Sheplan & Schwartz, 1974 – Andros boa – Andros Island and Berry Island, the Bahamas
- Chilabothrus strigilatus mccraniei Sheplan & Schwartz, 1974 – Ragged Island boa – Ragged Island, the Bahamas

== Etymology ==
The subspecific name, fowleri, is in honor of herpetologist Danny C. Fowler.

The subspecific name, mccraniei, is in honor of American herpetologist James R. McCranie.
