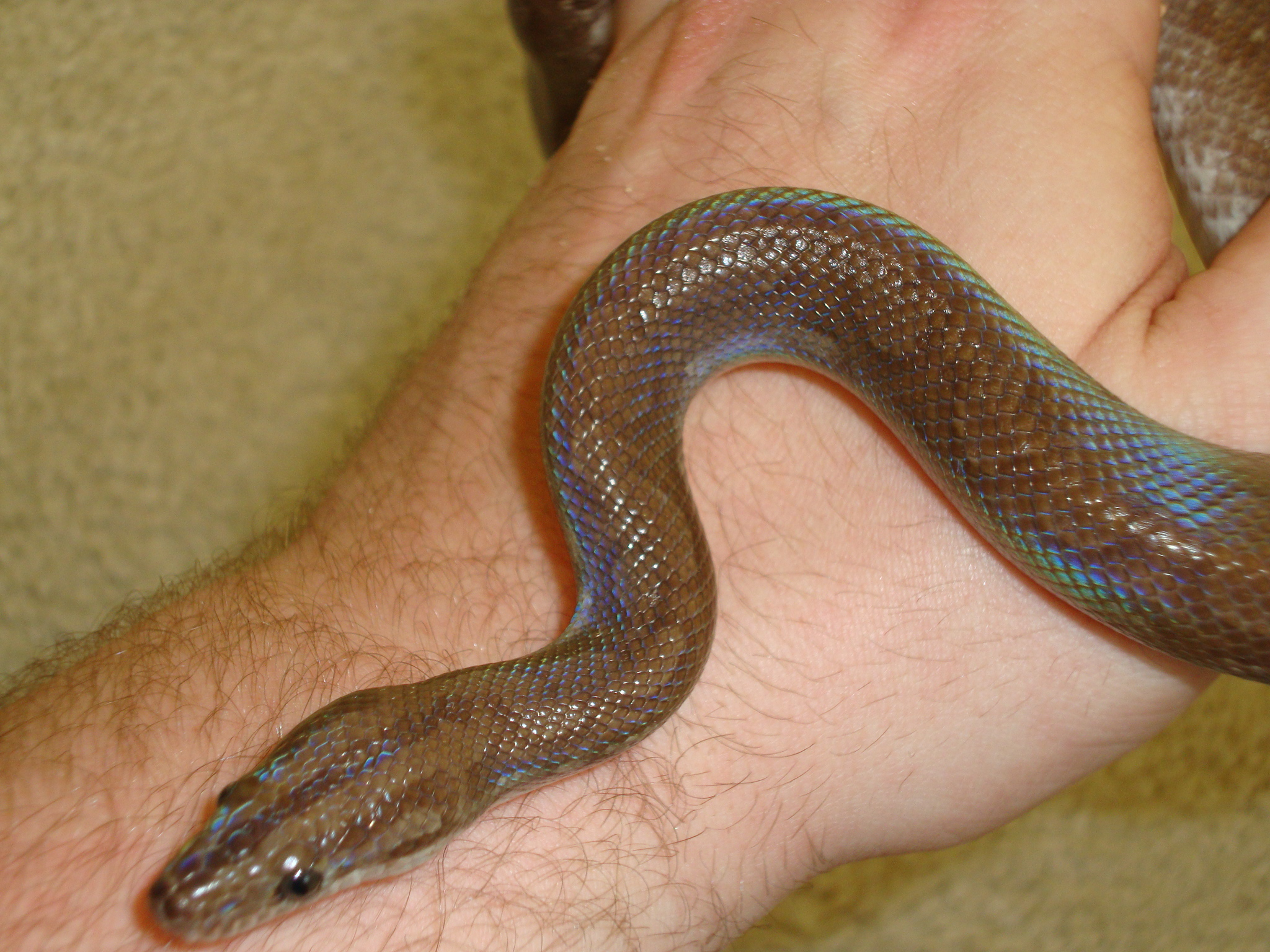
- Colombian rainbow boa

Conservation status
- Least Concern (IUCN 3.1)

Scientific classification
- Kingdom: Animalia
- Phylum: Chordata
- Class: Reptilia
- Order: Squamata
- Suborder: Serpentes
- Family: Boidae
- Genus: Epicrates
- Species: E. maurus

Binomial name
- Epicrates maurus Gray, 1849

Synonyms
- Boa cenchria Linnaeus, 1758; [Boa] Cenchria Linnaeus, 1758; Coluber tamachia Scopoli, 1788; Boa Cenchris Gmelin, 1788; Boa aboma Daudin, 1803; Boa ternatea Daudin, 1803; Boa annulifer Daudin, 1803; [Epicrates] cenchria Wagler, 1830; Epicrates cenchria maurus Gray, 1849

= Epicrates maurus =

Species of snake

Epicrates maurus is a species of non-venomous constrictor in the family Boidae, commonly found in the Amazon region of South America. The common name for this species is the brown rainbow boa. This species is semi-arboreal, spending time both on the ground and climbing trees and shrubs, although they are also known to swim. They are nocturnal and primarily active in the middle of the night. Rainbow boas are known for their attractive iridescent sheen on their scales in the sunlight.

== Description ==
Size and weight:

Epicrates maurus is the smallest of the rainbow boas, reaching lengths of 3 to 5 feet on average, although length varies by subspecies. For example, the most common subspecies in captivity is the Colombian rainbow boa (E. m. colombianus) grows to 5–6 feet long and matures between 4–6 years old. There is a clear sexual dimorphism between male and female, with females being significantly larger in both length and girth.

Coloring:

Generally uniform brown in color with large dark edged vertebral rings and light centers forming saddles, there may also be a slightly off-center 'S' pattern. Through a process called metachrosis, rainbow boas exhibit a day-to-night color change. Primarily noticed in that their pattern will become lighter—almost silver—and have a molted silver sides and bottom. Although individuals of abnormal colors and patterns exist—for example those that exhibit pigmentation disorders such as albinism, they are very rare in the wild and are often found in captivity where these mutations are often bred.

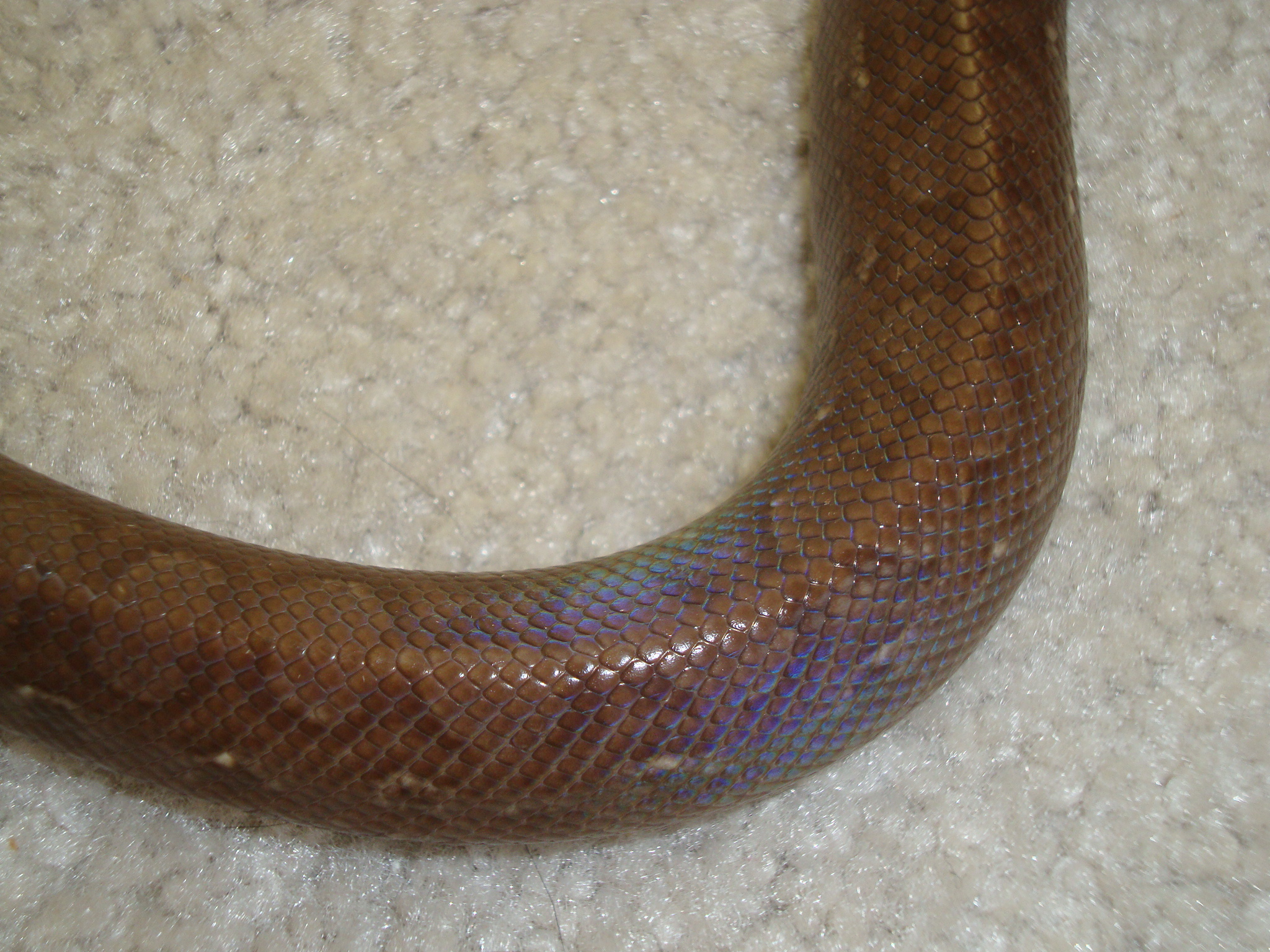
Colombian rainbow boa daytime

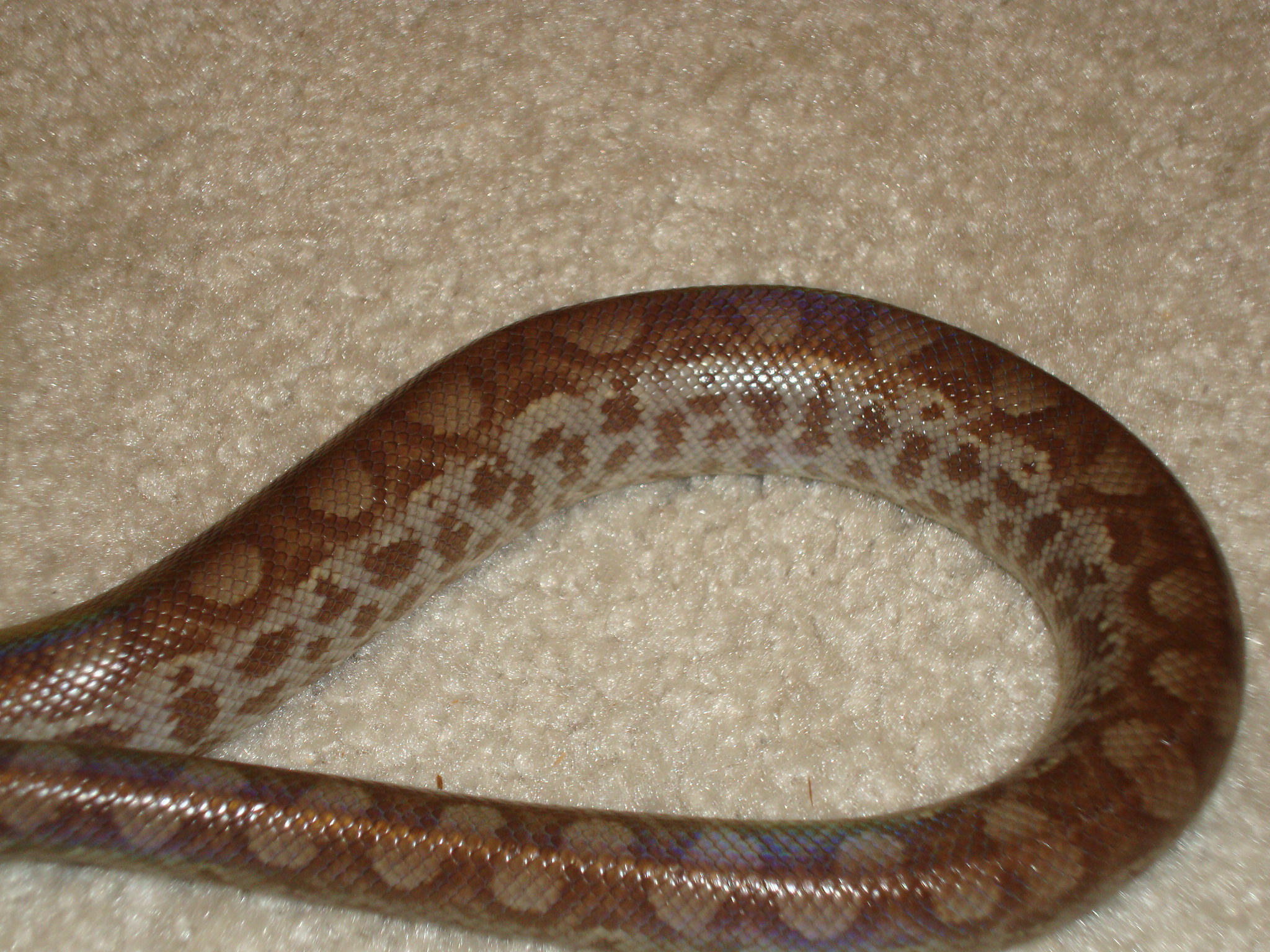
Colombian rainbow boa nighttime

These pictures provide a good example of the day-to-night color change; both pictures are of the same snake. Pictures were taken 3.2 hours apart.

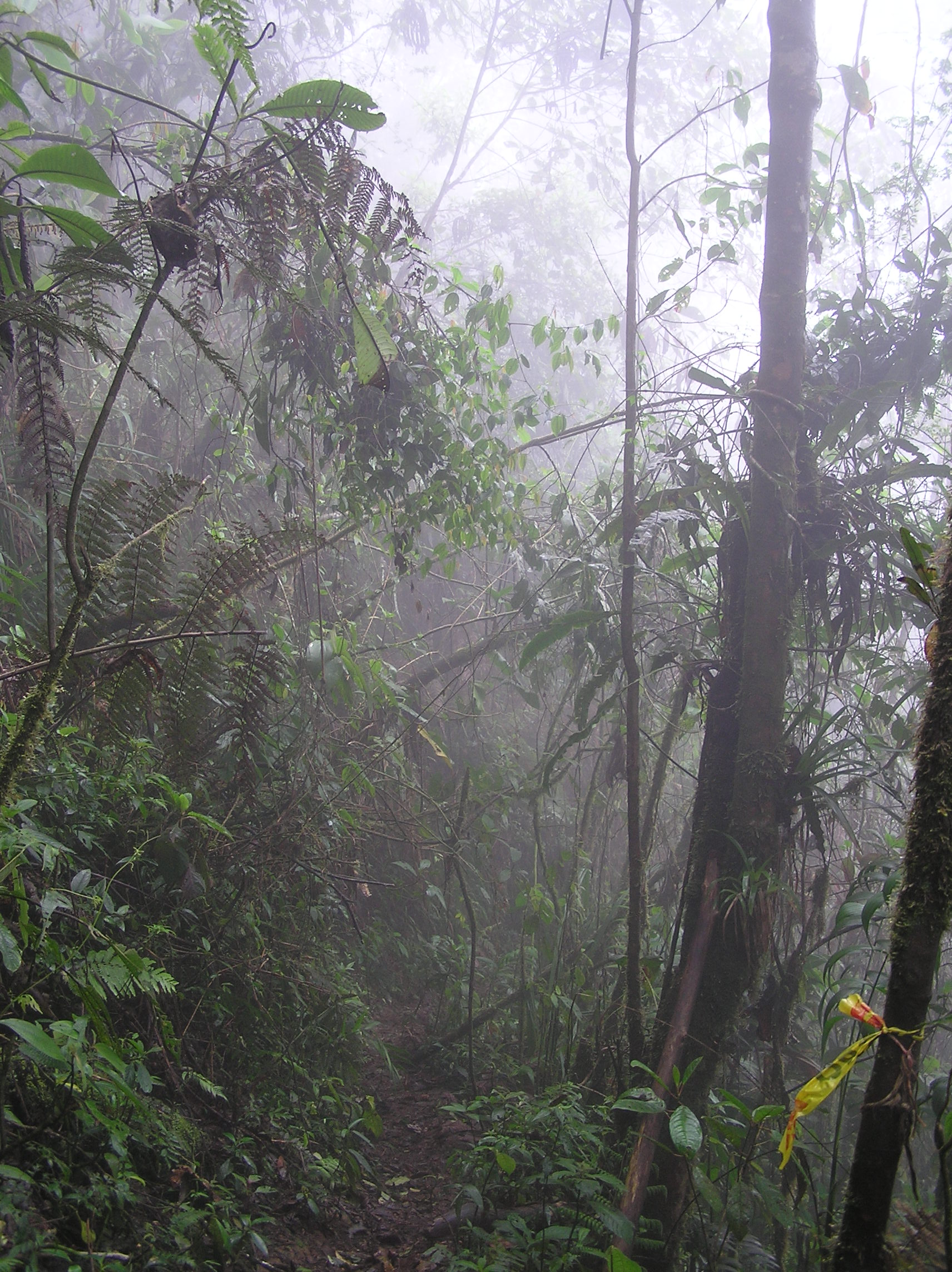
Colombian Rainforest

== Distribution and habitat ==
This species, being the northernmost rainbow boa, is found in rainforests and drier coastal clearings in its range; southern Central America, Trinidad and Tobago, and northern South America. More semi-arboreal when young, Colombian rainbow boas may climb into trees and shrubs to forage and avoid land predators; however, they become mostly terrestrial with age.

== Behavior ==
Colombian rainbow boas, like all boas in the family Boidae, are non-venomous snakes that subdue their prey with constriction. Like most boids, they have special heat-sensing pits on their faces that allow them to detect the body heat of their warm-blooded prey. While nocturnal, they may bask during the day when night-time temperatures are low. They are active at dawn and dusk and feed on small mammals (such as mice), birds and lizards using their heat-sensing abilities to hunt in the low light. Most Colombian rainbow boas will never need a prey item larger than a large rat; as with most snakes, they can expand their jaw to allow the consuming of items larger than the jaw would normally open (see snake skull). Wild Colombian rainbow boas may bite when they feel threatened as a defense. This bite can be painful, but is not dangerous. Care must still be taken against infection. Like all snakes, when in a shed cycle they will be more unpredictable and irritable due to the added stress of shedding and clouded sight.

== Reproduction ==
Colombian rainbow boas are solitary, associating only to mate. Boas are polygynous and ovoviviparous, thus males may mate with multiple females and give birth to live young. Females invest considerable maternal energy in their offspring since their young develop within the mother's body. The young are able to develop in a thermo-regulated, protected environment and they are provided with nutrients. Young are born fully developed and independent within minutes of birth.

=== Parthenogenesis ===
The effects of central fusion and terminal fusion on heterozygosity

Reproduction in snakes is almost exclusively sexual. Males ordinarily have a ZZ pair of sex determining chromosomes and females a ZW pair; however, it was recently shown that E. maurus is capable of reproducing by facultative parthenogenesis, resulting in production of WW female progeny. The WW females were likely produced by terminal automixis (see diagram), a type of parthenogenesis in which two terminal haploid products of meiosis fuse to form a zygote, which then develops into a daughter progeny. This is only the third genetically confirmed case of consecutive virgin births of viable offspring from a single female within any vertebrate lineage.

== Captivity ==
This species does very well in captivity and is considered by many to be the easiest of all the Epicrates species to maintain. It is generally described as similar in care to the Brazilian rainbow boa, but requiring lower temperatures and more tolerant of lower humidity. They primarily feed on mice and rats, but can be fed on a variety of appropriately-sized rodent and bird prey. Although they can be defensive and nippy when young, they generally become quite tame with regular handling.

The species Epicrates cenchria (the rainbow boa and primarily the subspecies E. c. cenchria (the Brazilian rainbow boa)) and E. maurus colombianus (the Colombian rainbow boa) are growing in popularity and are widely bred in captivity, with very few being imported. Breeders are attempting to produce a variety of different color and patterned "morphs" through selective breeding. This is done by encouraging the dominant and recessive genes that code for proteins involved in chromatophore development, maintenance, or function.

In January, 2015, a six-foot Epicrates maurus "slithered out of the toilet in an office restroom in downtown San Diego," California; it was uncertain as to who may have been its owner.

== Mythology ==
The Colombian rainbow boa has long held symbolic importance in local indigenous culture. Among the Muisca people, the rainbow was personified as the deity Cuchavira, who appeared after floods to restore balance and fertility to the land. The Colombian rainbow boa's iridescent, multicolored scales and serpentine form have been culturally associated with this rainbow deity, symbolizing protection, renewal, and the promise of life following destructive rains. In some oral traditions, the snake itself was revered as a manifestation of the rainbow, embodying the connection between the natural world and divine forces.
