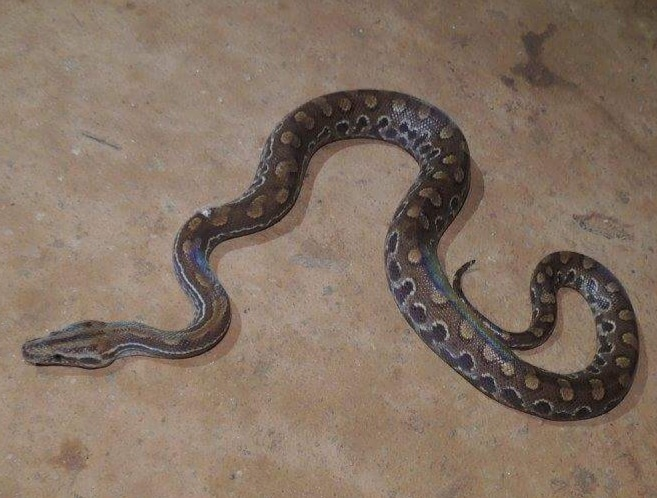

Conservation status
- Least Concern (IUCN 3.1)

Scientific classification
- Kingdom: Animalia
- Phylum: Chordata
- Class: Reptilia
- Order: Squamata
- Suborder: Serpentes
- Family: Boidae
- Genus: Epicrates
- Species: E. crassus

Binomial name
- Epicrates crassus Cope, 1862

= Epicrates crassus =

Species of snake

The Paraguayan rainbow boa (Epicrates crassus) is a species of snake in the family Boidae. The species is found in Argentina, Brazil, and Paraguay.

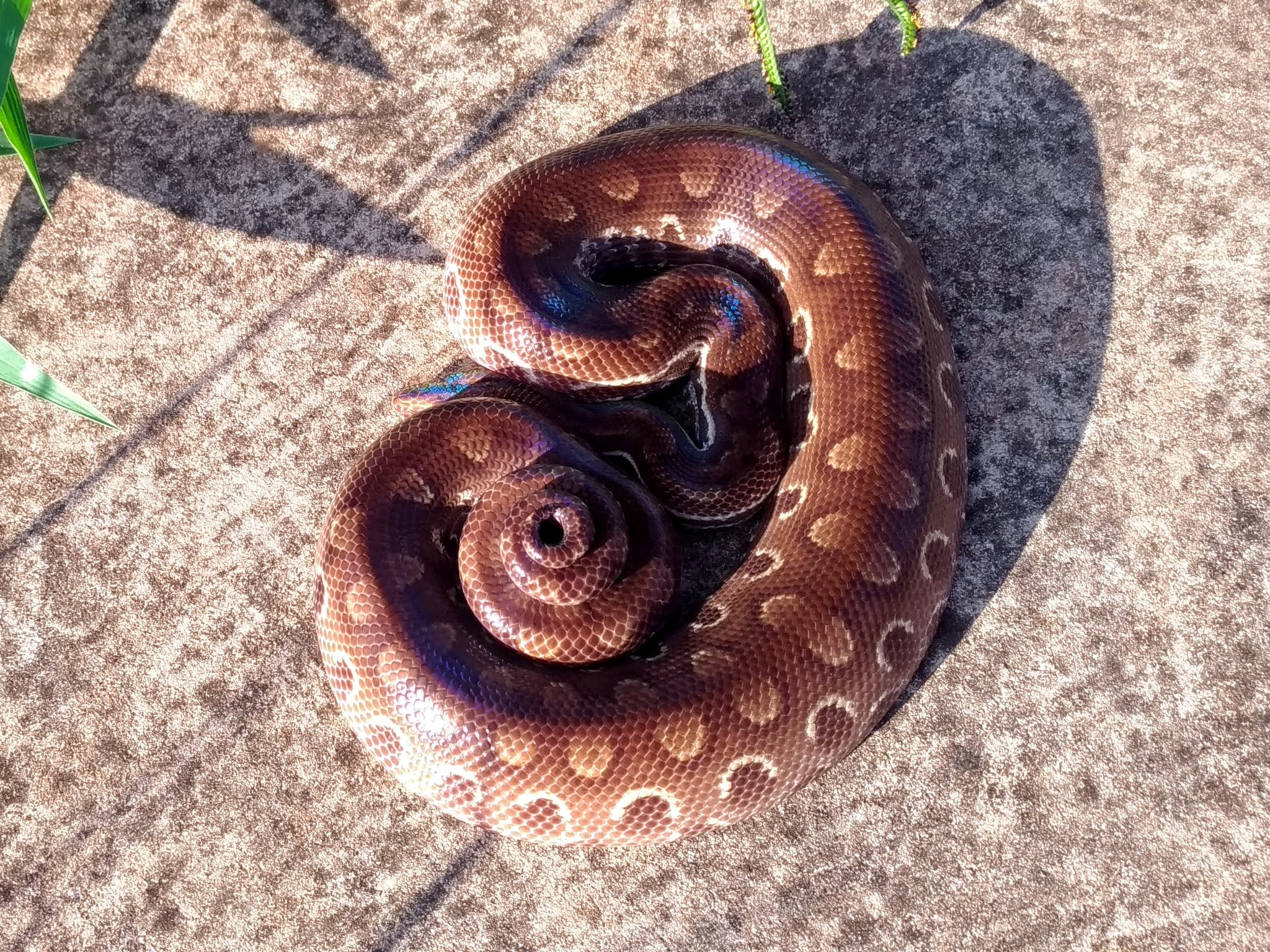
E. crassus
