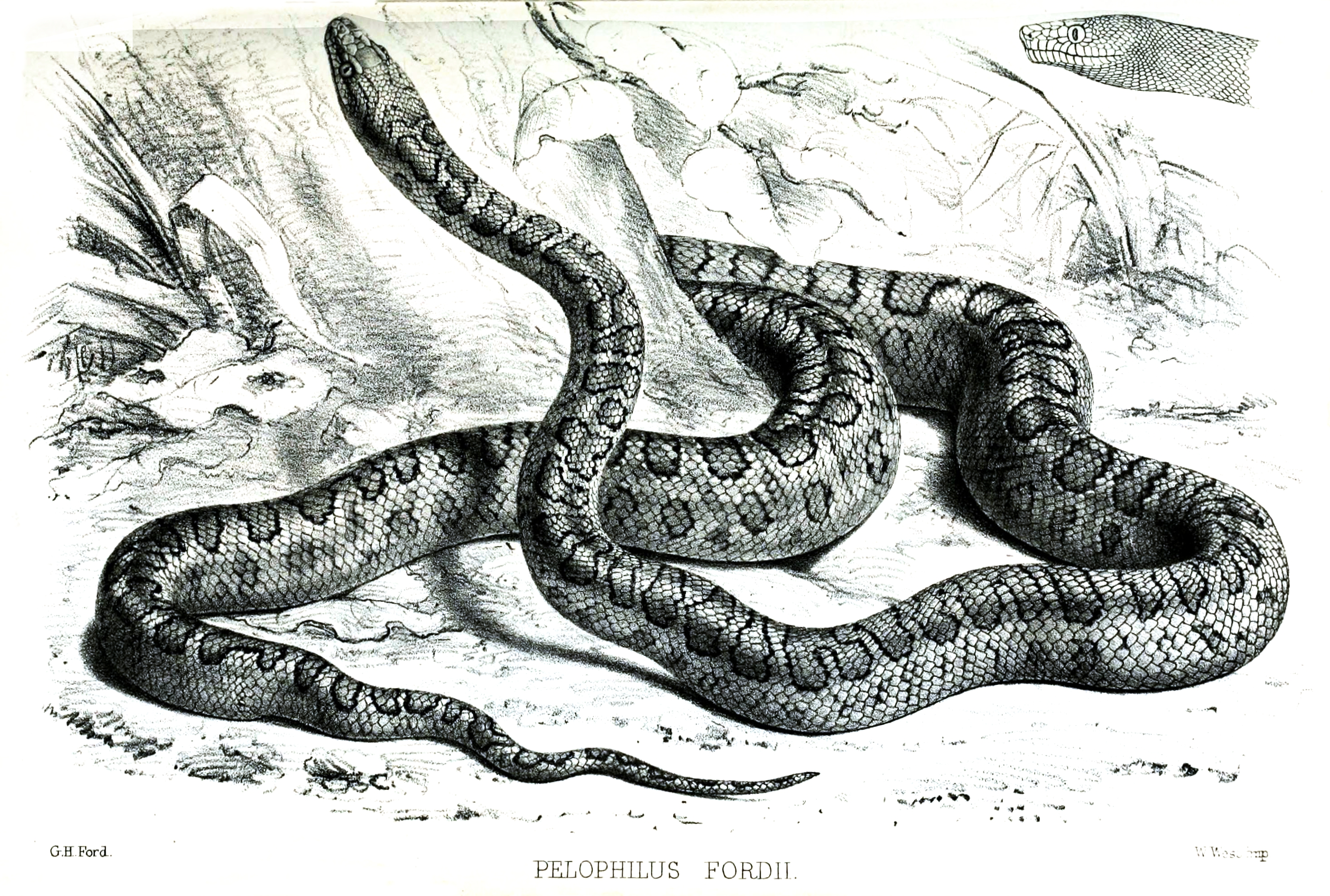
- illustration by G.H. Ford, for whom the species is named

Conservation status
- Near Threatened (IUCN 3.1)

Scientific classification
- Kingdom: Animalia
- Phylum: Chordata
- Class: Reptilia
- Order: Squamata
- Suborder: Serpentes
- Family: Boidae
- Genus: Chilabothrus
- Species: C. fordii

Binomial name
- Chilabothrus fordii (Günther, 1861)

Synonyms
- Pelophilus fordii Günther, 1861; Chilabothrus fordii — Jan, 1865; Chilabothrus maculatus J.G. Fischer, 1888; Epicrates fordii — Boulenger, 1893; Epicrates fordi [sic] — Schwartz & Thomas, 1975; Chilabothrus fordii — Reynolds et al., 2013

= Chilabothrus fordii =

Ford's boa

Species of snake endemic to Hispaniola

Chilabothrus fordii, also known commonly as Ford's boa and the Haitian ground boa, is a species of snake in the family Boidae. There are three recognized subspecies.

== Geographic range ==
C. fordii is endemic to the island of Hispaniola (in both Haiti and the Dominican Republic), including the surrounding islets of Île à Cabrit, Île de la Gonâve, Isla Catalina, and Isla Saona.

== Habitat ==
The preferred natural habitat of C. fordii is forest, at altitudes from sea level to 713 m (2,339 ft), but it has also been found in agricultural areas.

== Etymology ==
The specific name, fordii, is in honor of South African-born George Henry Ford, artist at the British Museum (Natural History), "whose merits in herpetology are well known by his truly artistical [sic] drawings".

== Description ==
C. fordii is a small snake. Adults may attain a total length of 74 cm (29 1/8 in), which includes a tail 12.5 cm (4 7/8 in) long.

Dorsally, it has a ground color that is pale olive, yellowish, or reddish, overlaid by a series of transverse dark brown blotches, which are oval or kidney-shaped, with blackish borders. Some of these blotches may merge to form a wide wavy stripe in some places. Ventrally, it is yellowish, with small brown spots.

The smooth dorsal scales are arranged in 33-43 rows. The ventrals number 250-265; the anal plate is entire; and the subcaudals, which number 70-80, are also entire.

On the dorsal surface of the head, the large frontal contacts the supraoculars; the remainder is covered by small irregular plates. There are 13 or 14 upper labials, without labial pits.

== Diet ==
C. fordii preys upon lizards and rodents.

== Reproduction ==
C. fordii is viviparous.

== Subspecies ==
Three subspecies are recognized as being valid, including the nominate subspecies.

- Chilabothrus fordii fordii (Günther, 1861)
- Chilabothrus fordii agametus Sheplan & Schwartz, 1974
- Chilabothrus fordii manototus Schwartz, 1979

Nota bene: A trinomial authority in parentheses indicates that the subspecies was originally described in a genus other than Chilabothrus.
