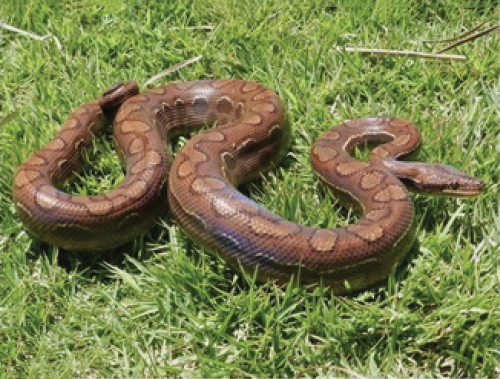

Conservation status
- Least Concern (IUCN 3.1)

Scientific classification
- Kingdom: Animalia
- Phylum: Chordata
- Class: Reptilia
- Order: Squamata
- Suborder: Serpentes
- Family: Boidae
- Genus: Epicrates
- Species: E. assisi

Binomial name
- Epicrates assisi Machado, 1945

= Epicrates assisi =

Species of snake

Epicrates assisi is a species of snake in the family Boidae. The species is endemic to Brazil.
