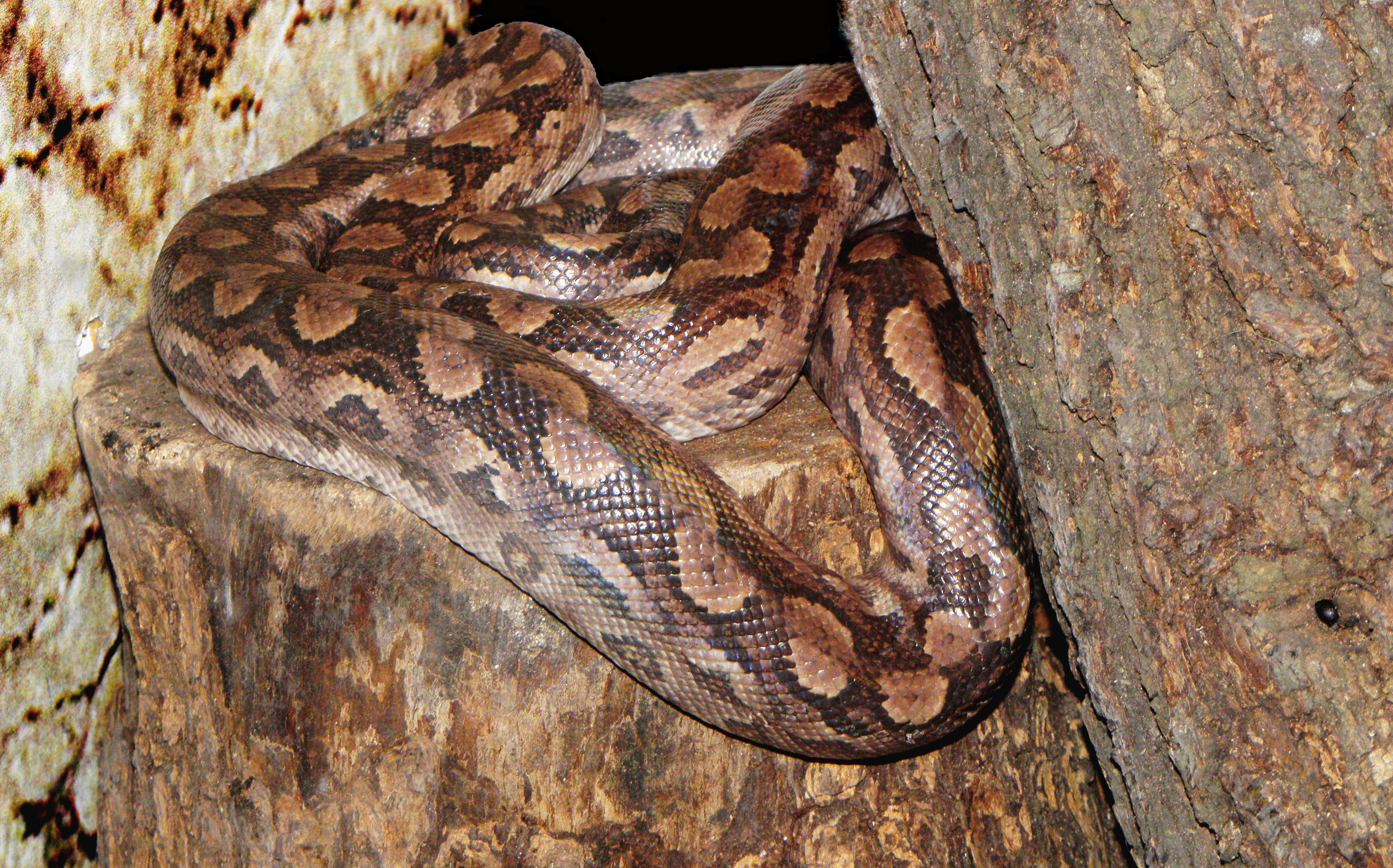

Conservation status
- Near Threatened (IUCN 3.1)

Scientific classification
- Kingdom: Animalia
- Phylum: Chordata
- Class: Reptilia
- Order: Squamata
- Suborder: Serpentes
- Family: Boidae
- Genus: Epicrates
- Species: E. alvarezi

Binomial name
- Epicrates alvarezi Ábalos, Báez, & Nader, 1964

= Epicrates alvarezi =

Species of snake

Epicrates alvarezi, the Argentinian rainbow boa, is a species of snake in the family Boidae. The species is found in Argentina, Bolivia, and Paraguay.
