= Rose Island, Bahamas =

Island of the Bahamas

Rose Island
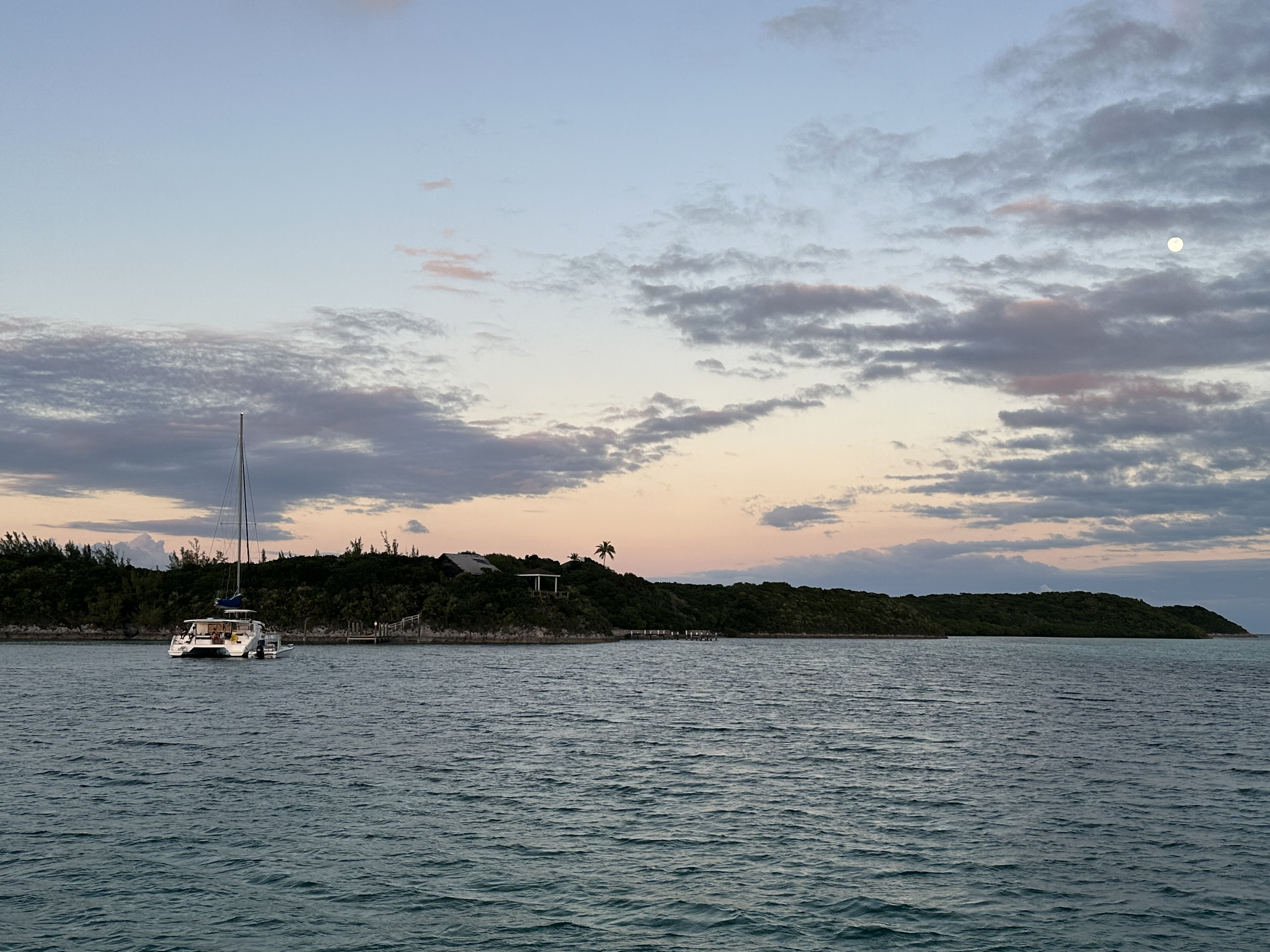
- Rose Island at sunset

- Location within Bahamas

Geography
- Location: Atlantic Ocean
- Coordinates: 25°05′15″N 77°13′10″W
- Archipelago: Lucayan Archipelago

Administration
- Bahamas

Additional information
- Time zone: EST (UTC-5)
  - Summer (DST): EDT (UTC-4)
- ISO code: BS-NP

Rose Island is a small island in the Bahamas that lies 5 kilometres (3 mi) east of Paradise Island, which lies directly off of New Providence Island. The island has no formal residential infrastructure and no roads. The center 2.5 km^{2} (1 sq mi) was owned by Claude Turner for around 36 years up until 2005. The largest mass of the island is made up of a shallow inland lagoon in the center of the island. The highest elevation on the island is 16 m (52 ft). The island has a thin peninsula which juts out 11 km (7 mi) east. The island is home to a number of swimming pigs, and was home to a pineapple plantation centuries ago.

In February 1962, the actress, Jayne Mansfield, her husband, Mickey Hargitay, and Jack Drury, a hotel press agent, were rescued from Rose Island after spending the night on a small coral reef nearby. The trio had been marooned after a boating mishap the prior day.

The island's coast was the filming location for the crash-landing of a Vulcan Bomber in the 1965 James Bond film Thunderball.
