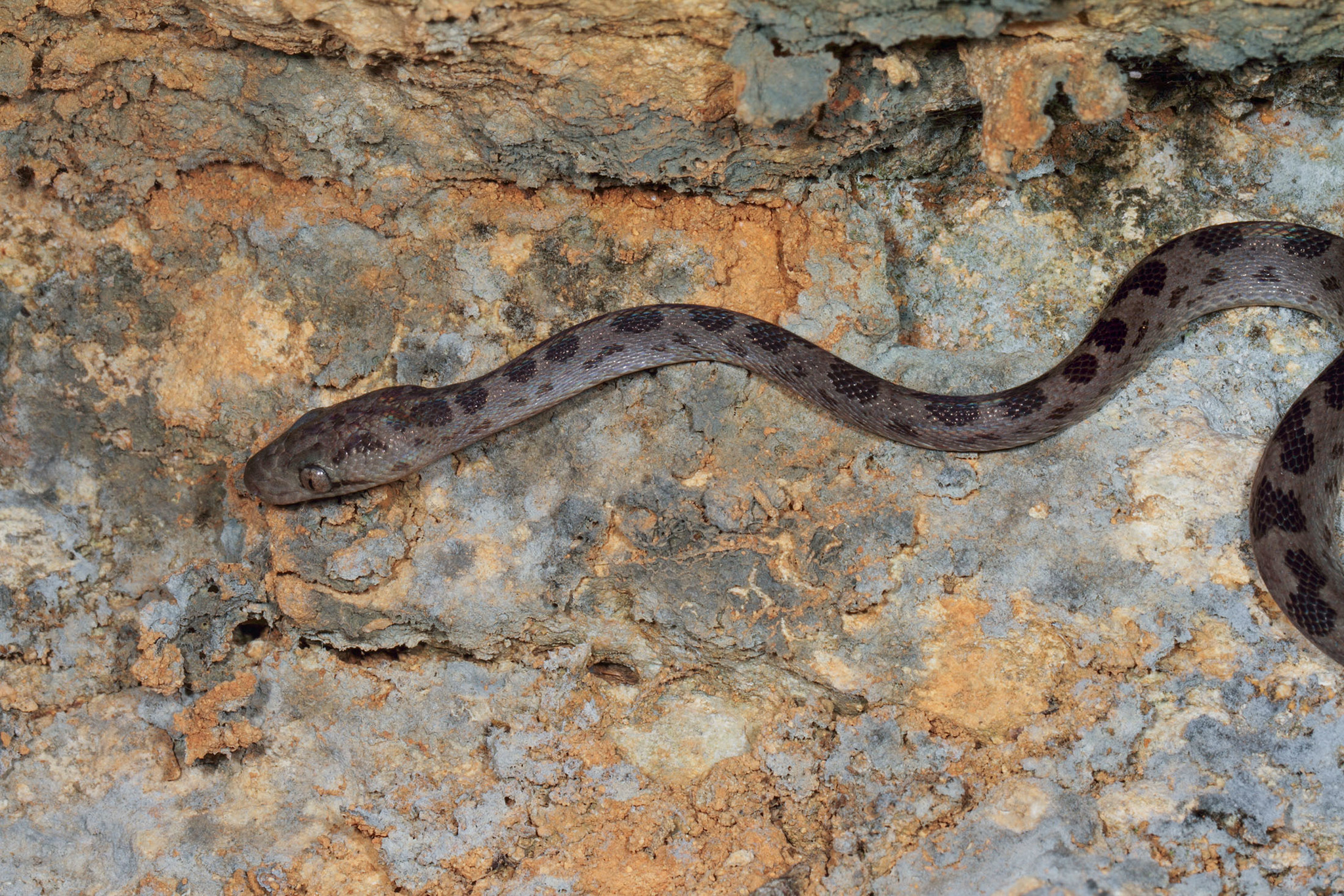

Conservation status
- Near Threatened (IUCN 3.1)

Scientific classification
- Domain: Eukaryota
- Kingdom: Animalia
- Phylum: Chordata
- Class: Reptilia
- Order: Squamata
- Suborder: Serpentes
- Family: Boidae
- Genus: Chilabothrus
- Species: C. gracilis

Binomial name
- Chilabothrus gracilis (J.G. Fischer, 1888)

Synonyms
- Epicrates gracilis Boulenger, 1893

= Chilabothrus gracilis =

Species of snake

Chilabothrus gracilis is a species of nonvenomous snake in the Boidae family. It is endemic to Hispaniola (split between Haiti and the Dominican Republic).

== Description ==
Adults may attain a total length of 89.5 cm (35 1/4 in), which includes a tail 16.5 cm (6 1/2 in) long.

Dorsally it is blackish gray, with small black spots, which are arranged in six series running down the body. Ventrally it is lighter in color.

The smooth dorsal scales are arranged in 40 rows. Ventrals 282–289; anal plate entire; subcaudals 100-103 also entire.

The body is slender and strongly laterally compressed. Upper labials 11 or 12, the sixth and seventh (or fifth and sixth) entering the eye.

== Subspecies ==
Two subspecies are recognized:

- Chilabothrus gracilis gracilis (J.G. Fischer, 1888)
- Chilabothrus gracilis hapalus Sheplan & Schwartz, 1974
