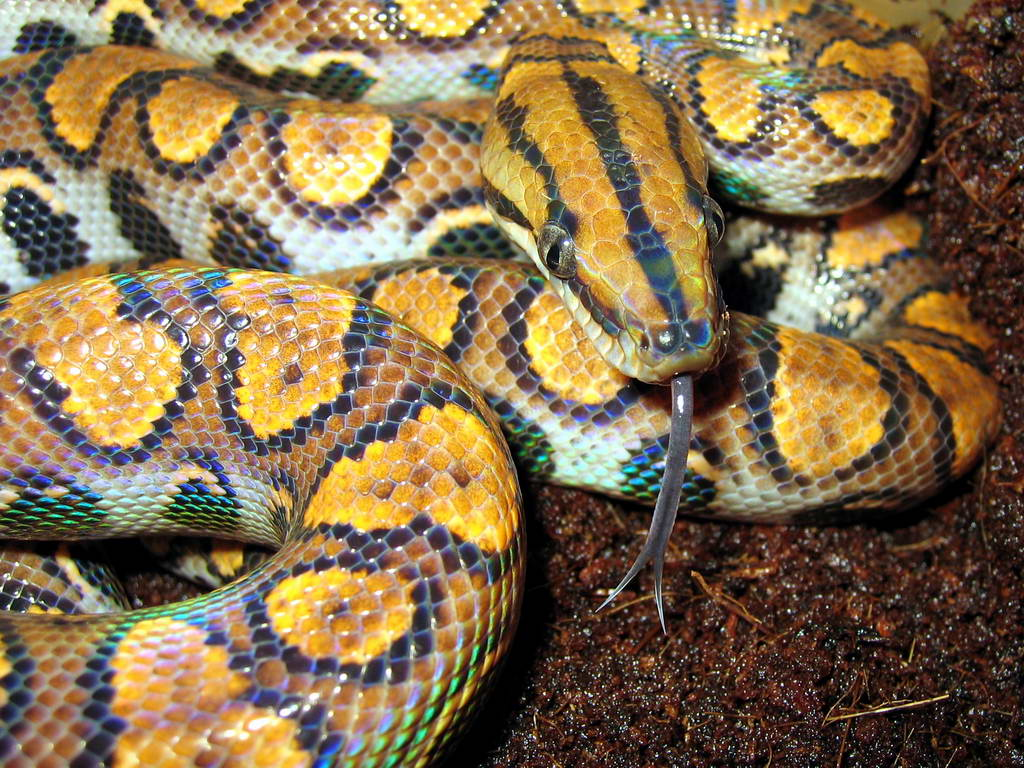
- Brazilian rainbow boa, E. c. cenchria

Scientific classification
- Kingdom: Animalia
- Phylum: Chordata
- Class: Reptilia
- Order: Squamata
- Suborder: Serpentes
- Family: Boidae
- Subfamily: Boinae
- Genus: Epicrates; Wagler, 1830

Synonyms
- Epicrates Wagler, 1830; Chilabothrus A.M.C. Duméril & Bibron, 1844; Cliftia Gray, 1849; Epicarsius Fischer, 1856; Piesigaster Seoane, 1881; Epicrates Boulenger, 1893; Boella H.M. Smith & Chiszar, 1992

= Epicrates (snake) =

Genus of snakes

Epicrates is a genus of non-venomous snakes in the subfamily Boinae of the family Boidae. The genus is native to South America and Central America. Five species are currently recognized as being valid, including the rainbow boa.

== Distribution and habitat ==
Species of Epicrates are found in lower Central America through South America as far south as Argentina.

== Species ==
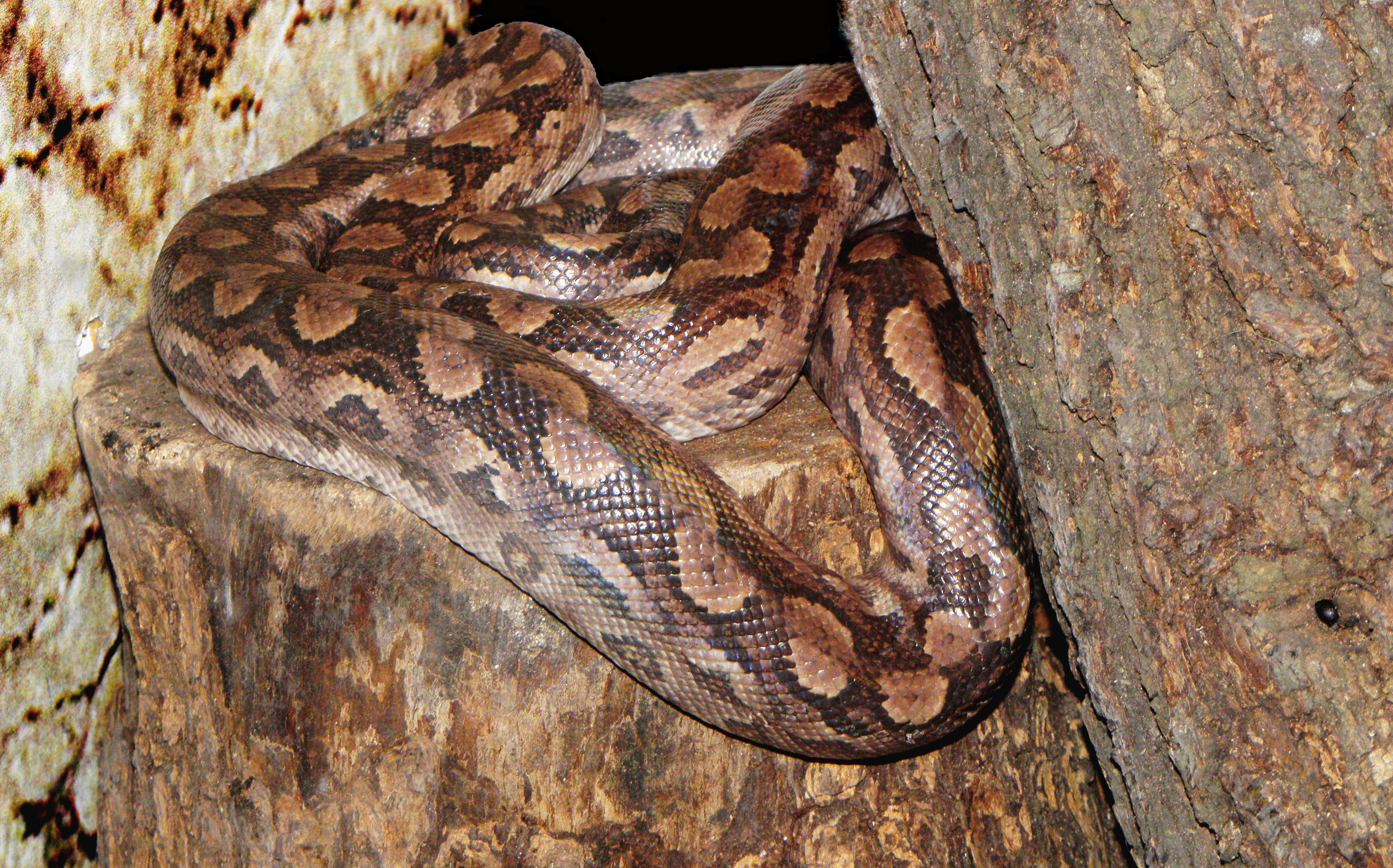
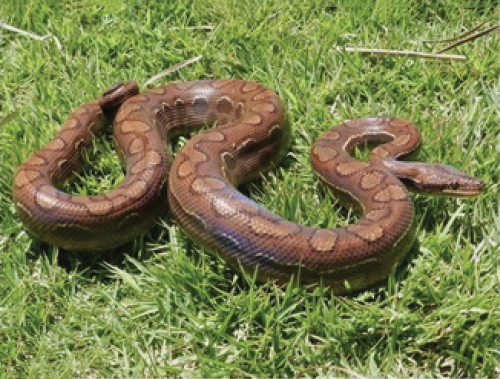
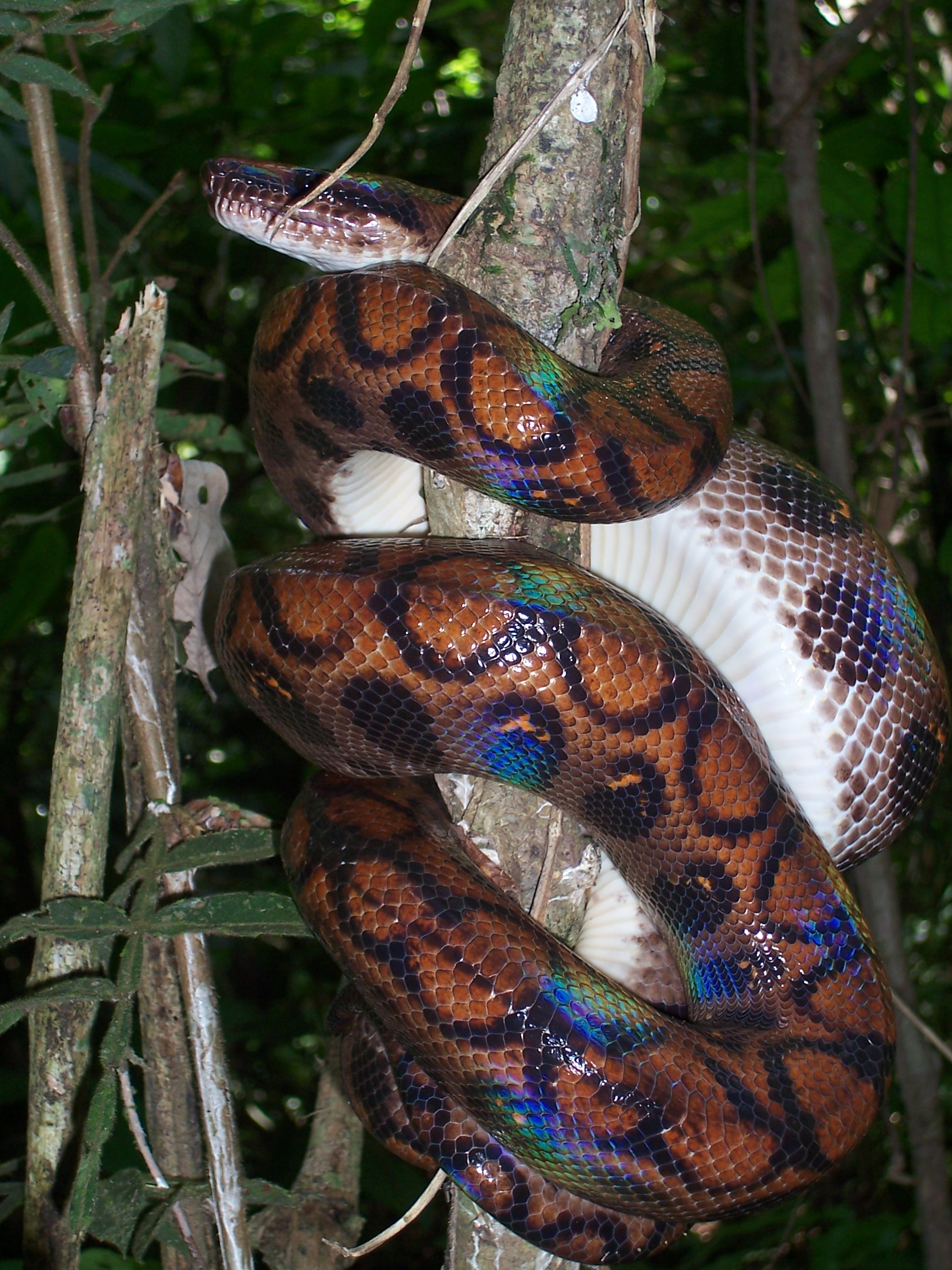
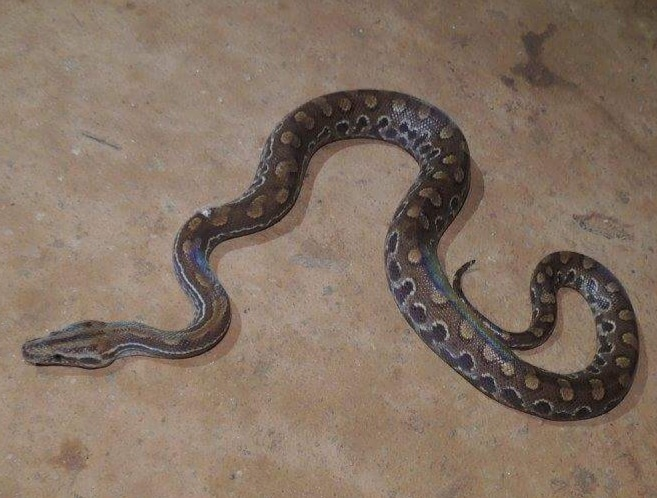
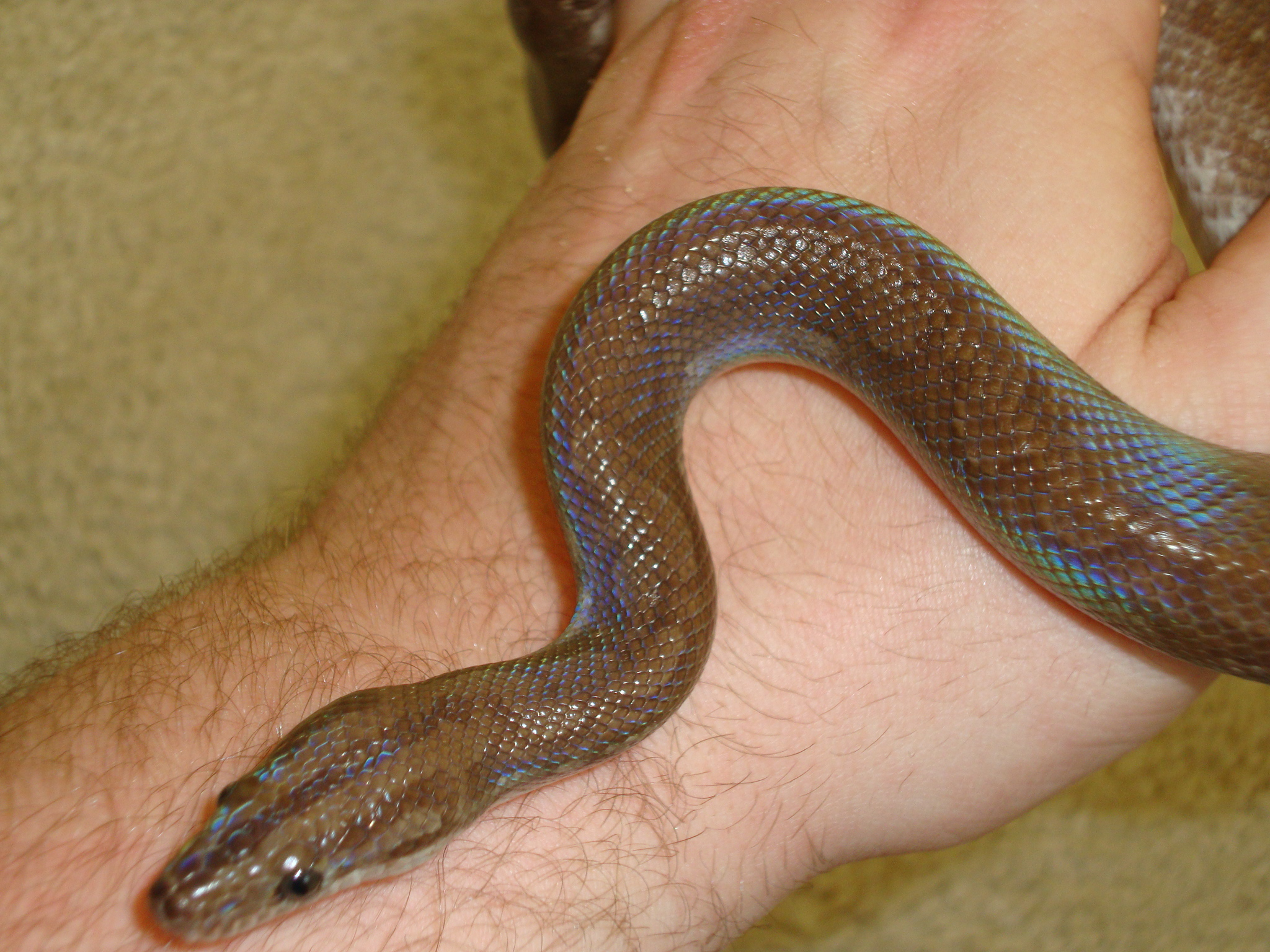
Species	Taxon author	Subspecies*	Common name	Geographic range	Image
E. alvarezi	Ábalos, Báez & Nader, 1964	0	Argentinian rainbow boa	northern Argentina, southeastern Bolivia, western Paraguay
E. assisi	Machado, 1945	0	Caatinga rainbow boa	Brazil
E. cenchria^{T}	(Linnaeus, 1758)	4*	Rainbow boa	French Guiana, Suriname, Guyana, Colombia, Venezuela, Peru, Brazil, Bolivia, and Argentina
E. crassus	(Cope, 1862)	0	Paraguayan rainbow boa	Paraguay, Bolivia, Argentina, and Brazil
E. maurus	Gray, 1849	0	Colombian rainbow boa; Brown rainbow boa	Nicaragua, Costa Rica, Panama, Colombia, Venezuela, Guyana, Suriname, northern Brazil, Trinidad, Tobago, Isla Margarita.

- ) Not including the nominate subspecies.

^{T}) Type species.

== Etymology ==
The specific name, alvarezi, is in honor of Argentine herpetologist Antenor Álvarez (1864–1948).

The specific name, assisi, is in honor of Arlindo de Assis who collected the holotype.
