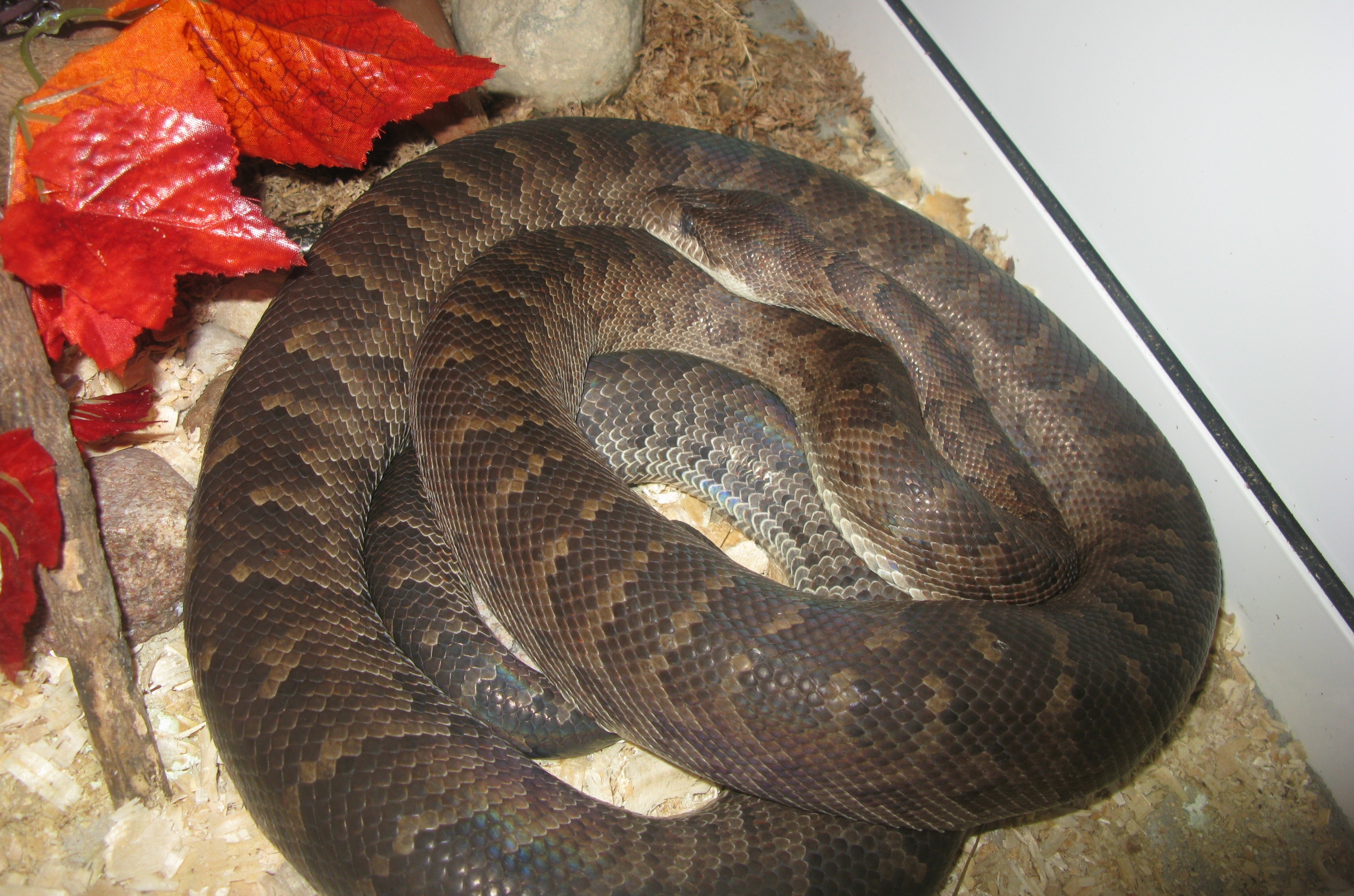
- A captive Chilabothrus striatus in a terrarium

Conservation status
- Least Concern (IUCN 3.1)

Scientific classification
- Kingdom: Animalia
- Phylum: Chordata
- Class: Reptilia
- Order: Squamata
- Suborder: Serpentes
- Family: Boidae
- Genus: Chilabothrus
- Species: C. striatus

Binomial name
- Chilabothrus striatus (J.G. Fischer, 1856)

Synonyms
- Homalochilus striatus J.G. Fischer, 1856; Epicrates striatus — Steindachner, 1864; Chilabothrus striatus — Reynolds et al., 2013

= Chilabothrus striatus =

Species of snake endemic to Hispaniola

Chilabothrus striatus, the Hispaniolan boa, is a species of snake in the family Boidae. The species is endemic to Hispaniola (split between Haiti and the Dominican Republic). The species is regularly found in the international pet trade. Small individuals eat lizards of the genus Anolis, while larger individuals eat birds and rodents.

== Subspecies ==
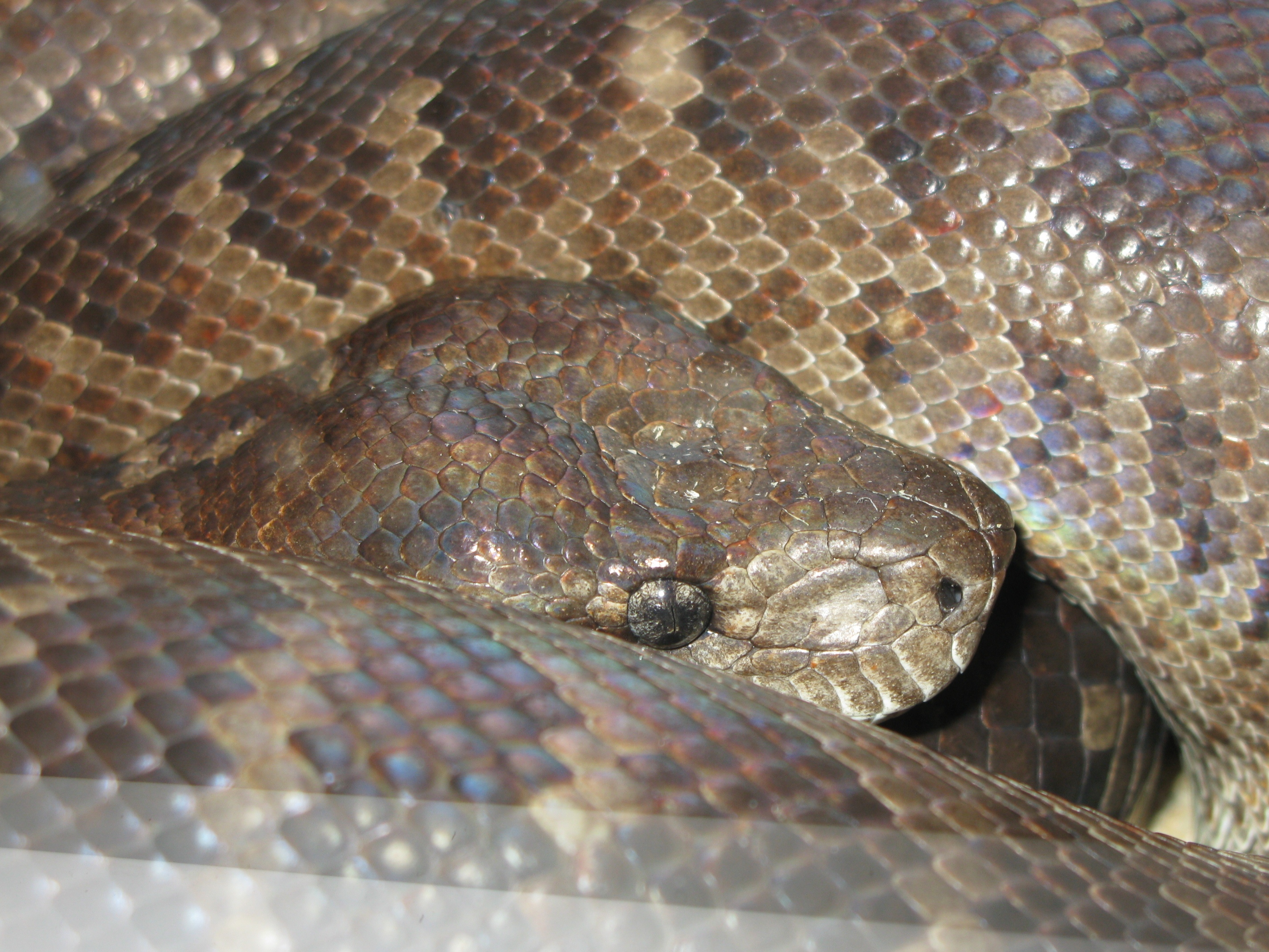
Close-up of head of Chilabothrus striatus showing vertical pupil characteristic of the genus Chilabothrus

Three subspecies are recognized:

- Chilabothrus striatus exagistus Sheplan & Schwartz, 1974 – Tiburon Peninsula boa
- Chilabothrus striatus striatus (J.G. Fischer, 1856) – Hispaniolan or Dominican red mountain boa
- Chilabothrus striatus warreni Sheplan & Schwartz, 1974 – Tortuga Island boa
- Chilobothrus striatus fosteri (Thomas Barbour, 1941) – Bimini Boa

Nota bene: A trinomial authority in parentheses indicates that the subspecies was originally described in a genus other than Chilabothrus.

== Etymology ==
The subspecific name warreni is in honor of C. Rhea Warren who collected herpetological specimens on Île de la Tortue.
