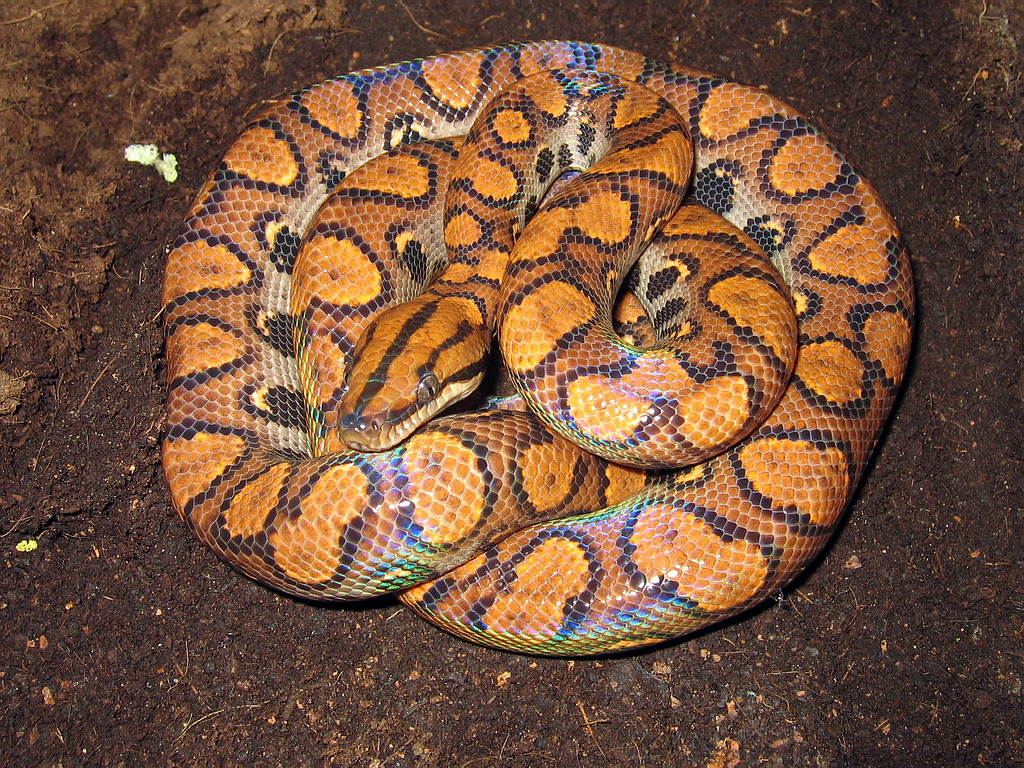

Conservation status
- Least Concern (IUCN 3.1)

Scientific classification
- Kingdom: Animalia
- Phylum: Chordata
- Class: Reptilia
- Order: Squamata
- Suborder: Serpentes
- Family: Boidae
- Genus: Epicrates
- Species: E. cenchria

Binomial name
- Epicrates cenchria (Linnaeus, 1758)

Synonyms
- Synonyms List: Boa cenchria Linnaeus, 1754; [Boa] Cenchria Linnaeus, 1758; Coluber tamachia Scopoli, 1788; Boa Cenchris — Gmelin, 1788; Boa aboma Daudin, 1803; Boa ternatea Daudin, 1803; Boa annulifer Daudin, 1803; [Epicrates] cenchria — Wagler, 1830; Cliftia fusca Gray, 1849; Epicarsius cupreus J.G. Fischer, 1856; Epicarsius cupreus — Brown, 1893; Epicrates cenchris — Boulenger, 1893; Epicrates cenchria — Griffin, 1916; Epicrates cenchria var. fusca — Griffin, 1916; Epicrates cenchria cenchria — Amaral, 1930; Epicrates cenchria cenchria — Stull, 1938

= Rainbow boa =

Species of snake

The rainbow boa (Epicrates cenchria) is a boa species endemic to South America. A semi-arboreal species (not only do they climb in the wild but also proven in captivity), it is known for its attractive iridescent/holographic sheen caused by structural coloration. Five subspecies are currently recognized, including the nominate subspecies described here.

== Distribution and habitat ==
The rainbow boa is found in South America. It occurs east of the Andes, roughly reaching northern Argentina (in the provinces Chaco, Córdoba, Corrientes, Formosa, Salta, Santiago del Estero and Tucumán).

The rainbow boa's habitat generally consists of humid woodlands and rainforests, but it can also be found in open savannas.

== Description ==
The rainbow boa is typically orange, brown, or reddish brown, with a paler belly and black markings: three parallel stripes on the head, rings down the back, and lateral blotches with a crescent over them, although there is a great deal of natural variation that may be heightened by artificial breeding. It is 4 to 6 feet in length and sexually dimorphic, as females are slightly longer and have wider abdomens. Males are stronger when compared with females of the same length and more resistant to handling.

== Behavior ==
The rainbow boa is nocturnal and most active in the middle of the night.

This species is semi-arboreal, spending time both on the ground and in trees. It is also known to spend time in bodies of water, and is considered a capable swimmer.

=== Mating habits ===
The rainbow boa reaches sexual maturity at 1.2 meters for males and 1.4 meters for females, or when they're approximately 2.5 to 4 years old. Females need to be the correct size otherwise they could have complications during and after birth. Males can mate with multiple females which can be beneficial for reptile breeding.

=== Eating habits during breeding season ===
Males generally go without feeding during the mating season and females tend to eat smaller portions during the breeding season. In order to decrease the probability of birthing issues, females should be fed smaller rats/mice in order to save space for proper ova development.

It is not unusual for both sexes to go without eating during the mating season.

== Captivity ==
The most common type of rainbow boa found in the pet trade is the Brazilian rainbow boa, E. c. cenchria. During the 1980s and early 1990s, substantial numbers were exported from Suriname. Today, however, far fewer are exported, and most offered for sale are captive bred. With good care, a captive Brazilian rainbow boa can be expected to live for up to 30 years, but most live up to 20.

== Subspecies ==
Subspecies	Taxon author	Common name	Geographic range
Epicrates cenchria barbouri	Stull, 1938	Marajo Island rainbow boa
Epicrates cenchria cenchria	(Linnaeus, 1758)	Brazilian rainbow boa	the Amazon Basin and in coastal Guiana, French Guiana, Suriname and southern Venezuela
Epicrates cenchria gaigeae	Stull, 1938	Peruvian rainbow boa
Epicrates cenchria hygrophilus	Amaral, 1935	Espirito Santo rainbow boa
Epicrates cenchria polylepis	Amaral, 1935	Central Highlands rainbow boa

== Etymology ==
The subspecific names barbouri and gaigeae are in honor of American herpetologists Thomas Barbour and Helen Beulah Thompson Gaige, respectively.

== Gallery ==
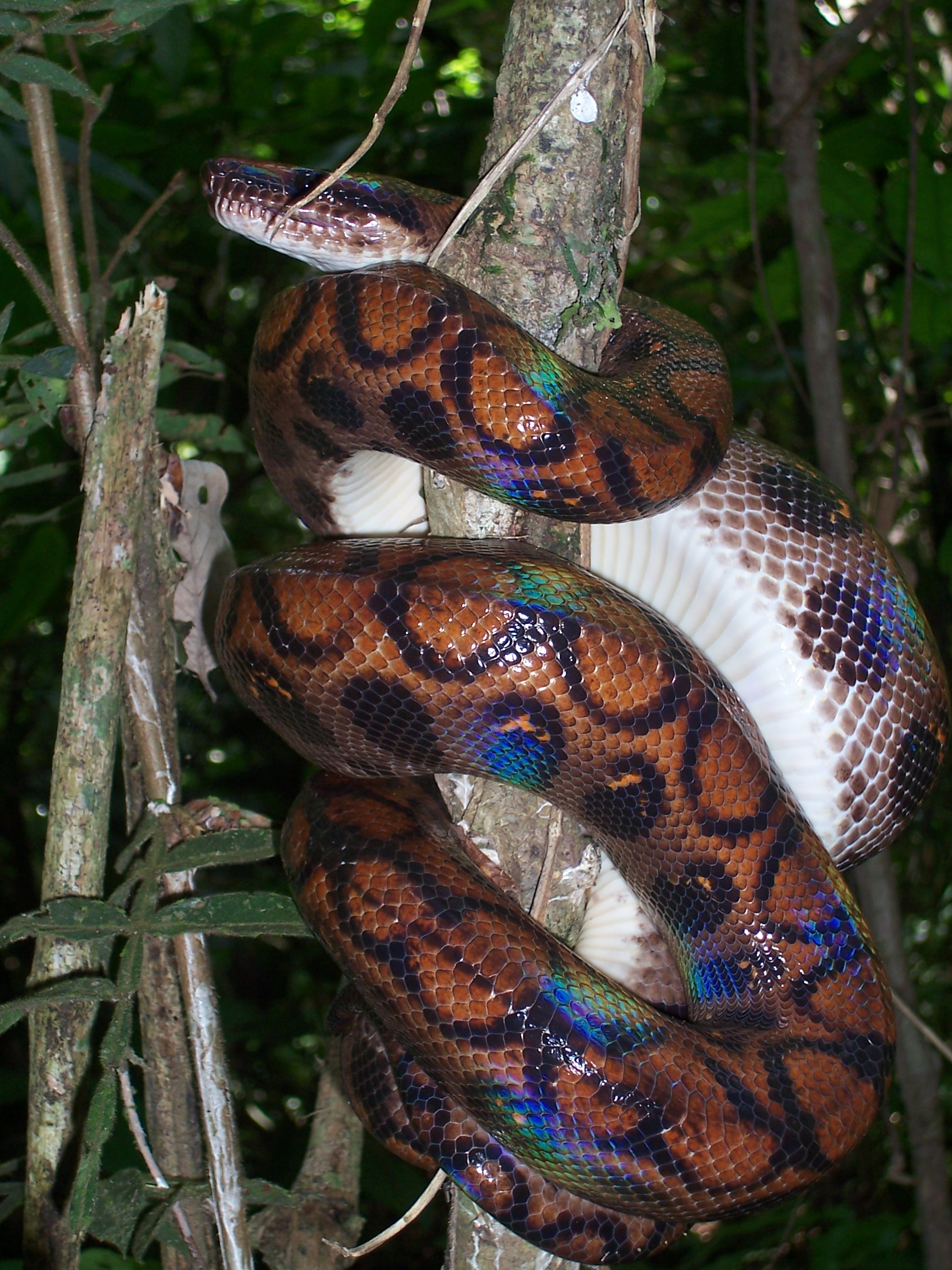
Peruvian subspecies (E. c. gaigeae)

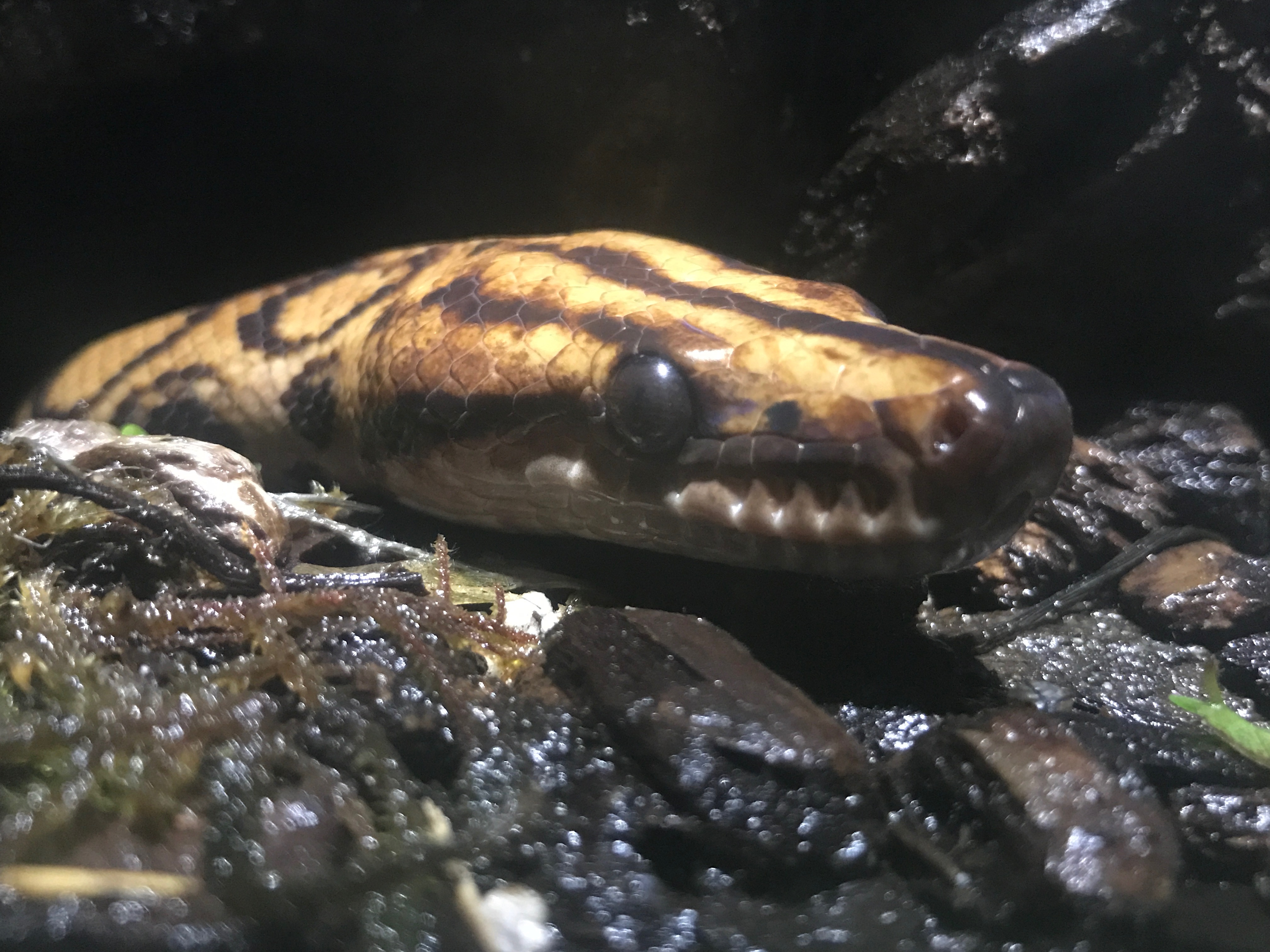
Brazilian rainbow boa at the Vancouver Aquarium
