= Gregoire Lake (disambiguation) =

Gregoire Lake is a lake in Alberta, Canada

Gregoire Lake or variation, may also refer to:

- Lake Gregoire, a fluvial lake on the Faucher River in Mauricie, Quebec, Canada
- Gregoire Lake Estates (Gregoire Lake), a hamlet in Wood Buffalo, Alberta, Canada
- Gregoire Lake Provincial Park, Wood Buffalo, Alberta, Canada
- Gregoire Lake 176 (Gregoire Lake), an Indian reserve of the Fort McMurray First Nation in Wood Buffalo, Alberta, Canada
- Gregoire Lake 176A (Gregoire Lake A), an Indian reserve of the Fort McMurray First Nation in Wood Buffalo, Alberta, Canada
- Gregoire Lake 176B (Gregoire Lake B), an Indian reserve of the Fort McMurray First Nation in Wood Buffalo, Alberta, Canada

== See also ==
- Fort McMurray First Nation, the people of the Gregoire Lake Indian Reserves
- Gregoire (disambiguation)
- Lake (disambiguation)
- Lake Gregory (disambiguation)
