= Joyce Ballou Gregorian =

American novelist

- Born: Joyce Ballou Gregorian; July 5, 1946; Boston, Massachusetts, U.S.
- Died: April 29, 1991 (aged 44); Massachusetts General Hospital, Boston, Massachusetts, U.S.
- Spouse: John Hampshire (m. 1986)
- Relatives: Arthur T. Gregorian (father)
- Writing career
- Genre: Fantasy
- Notable works: Tredana Trilogy: The Broken Citadel (1975), Castledown (1977), The Great Wheel (1987)

Joyce Ballou Gregorian Hampshire (July 5, 1946 – April 29, 1991) was an American author, expert on Oriental rugs, and horse breeder.

== Life ==
Joyce Ballou Gregorian was born in Boston, Massachusetts, the third child of Phebe Ballou, of New England descent and the noted oriental rug dealer and expert Arthur T. Gregorian, an Armenian immigrant. She graduated from Beaver Country Day School in 1963. She attended the University of Edinburgh for one year and graduated with honors from Radcliffe College in 1968.

She then taught English for one year at the Iran Bethel School in Tehran. After that she joined the family business and became president. She married John Hampshire in 1986.

== Writing ==
Joyce Ballou Gregorian wrote a trilogy of fantasy novels, sometimes called the "Tredana Trilogy," that takes place in a parallel world, focussed on the city of Tredana, its inhabitants and neighbors, in a part of that world which resembles the Middle East. The chief character is Sibyl Barron, from our own world, whose life is entwined with the other world. Her love of horses shows in her trilogy, and some horses she owned were written into the books.

She also collaborated with her father, Arthur T. Gregorian, and her nephew, Douglas Christian, on a book on Armenian oriental rugs.

She authored a variety of articles for Arabian breed publications chronicling major breeding families, profiling individual horses or breeders, and commenting on various topics in preservation breeding.

== Other activities ==
Gregorian was passionate about breeding and training working Arabian horses. She competed in eventing, Arabian breed shows, and dressage competitions, and she also exhibited her horses in unusual circumstances (such as an indoor mall) to demonstrate the Arabian's versatility. In the 1980s she discovered the Davenport Arabian bloodlines were being preserved as a separate breeding program and became dedicated to the desert-bred Arabian horse. In 1989 she was elected president of Al Khamsa, a preservation breeding group for Arabian horses. She was re-elected in 1990 and served until her death. Her breeding farm averaged about seventy head of Arabians. At the time of her death she had about 40 Davenport Arabian horses on her farm and another dozen from Al Khamsa bloodlines.

Gregorian purchased the Alice Payne library in 1988 from the estate of Alice Payne, a noted breeder and importer of desert-bred Arabians. The library was notable for containing large quantities of correspondence between Carl Raswan and Alice Payne. Carl Raswan was working on the Raswan Index while he was corresponding with Alice Payne, and was also offering advice on the directions her breeding program could go. Carl Raswan is considered by some in the Arabian horse world to be a controversial figure, but his views on strain breeding and "asil" (purity) are generally accepted by modern preservation breeders. Gregorian was an avid researcher of his life and opinions. The Alice Payne library also included annotated pictures, notes, and advertising pamphlets. The library is currently held by the Arabian Horse Trust.

Gregorian was also musical, both composing and performing (voice, harpsichord, lute and mandolin). Music and song have a significant role in her novels. Each chapter is separated from the next by a song or poem written by the author. She did all her own illustrations for each book.

Gregorian was a board member of the Armenian Library and Museum of America in Watertown, Massachusetts. During her tenure ALMA renovated an empty bank building, turning the space into a dedicated library, research, museum, and community meeting space.

== Death ==
Gregorian died in 1991 in Boston, Massachusetts, at Massachusetts General Hospital, after a long illness with cancer.

== Works ==
=== Novels ===
- The Broken Citadel. New York: Atheneum, 1975; Ace, 1983. ISBN 978-0-441-08098-4
- Castledown. New York: Atheneum, 1977; Ace, 1983, ISBN 978-0-441-09240-6
- The Great Wheel. New York: Ace, 1987, ISBN 978-0-441-30257-4

=== Nonfiction ===
- Arthur T. Gregorian and Joyce Gregorian Hampshire, with photos by Douglas A. Christian (1986), Armenian Rugs from the Gregorian Collection. Newton Lower Falls, Mass.: Congraf, paperback. Catalog of the exhibition in 1986 at the Museum of Fine Arts, St. Petersburg, Florida. Reviewed in the Bulletin (British Society for Middle Eastern Studies), Vol. 15, No. 1/2 (1988), p. 169.
