= Grégoire =

- Pronunciation: French: [gʁegwaʀ]
- Gender: Male

Origin
- Origin: Greek via Latin
- Meaning: watchful, alert
- Region of origin: worldwide

Other names
- Related names: Gregory, Greg, Gregg, Gregor, Gray, Grigori, Ory, Ari, George, Craig, Graig, McGregor, MacGregor

Grégoire is both a surname and a given name. Notable people with the name include:

== Surname / Family name ==
- Alexandre Grégoire (1922–2001), Haitian painter
- Antonina Grégoire (1914–1952), Belgian commercial engineer, feminist and communist, member of Belgian Partisans Armés resistance during the Second World War
- Augustus Gregoire (1936–1972), Dominican cricketer
- Christine Gregoire (born 1947), American Democratic governor of the state of Washington
- Christophe Grégoire (born 1980), Belgian footballer
- Emmanuel Grégoire (born 1977), French politician
- Gabriel Grégoire (born 1953), defensive lineman in the Canadian Football League
- Gaspard Grégoire (1751–1846), French silk-artist and color theorist
- Gilles Grégoire (1926–2006), co-founder of the Parti Québécois
- Henri Grégoire (1750–1831), French Roman Catholic priest, constitutional bishop of Blois and a revolutionary leader
- Henri Grégoire (historian) (1881–1964), scholar of the Byzantine Empire
- Jean-Albert Grégoire (1899–1992), pioneer of the front-wheel drive car
- Jérémy Grégoire (1995), Canadian professional ice hockey player
- Joseph-Ernest Grégoire (1886–1980), French Canadian politician
- Marie Grégoire (born 1965), Canadian politician of Quebec
- Oscar Grégoire (1877–1947), Belgian water polo player
- Paul Grégoire (1911–1993), Canadian Archbishop of Montreal
- Paul Grégoire (sculptor) (1915–1988), Dutch sculptor
- Pierre Grégoire (c.1540–1597), French jurist and philosopher
- Pierre Grégoire (politician) (1907–1991), Luxembourgish politician, journalist, and writer
- Raymond Grégoire (1905–1960), French physicist
- Richard Grégoire (1944–2025), Canadian composer
- Roly Gregoire (born 1958), English footballer
- Romain Grégoire (born 2003), French road cyclist
- Sophie Grégoire (born 1975), ex-wife of Justin Trudeau
- Stéphan Grégoire (born 1969), French race car driver

== Given name ==
- Gregoire (composer) (flourished c.1500–1504), French composer
- Grégoire (musician) (full name Grégoire Boissenot; born 1979), French composer and singer-songwriter
- Grégoire-Pierre Agagianian, leading prelate of the Armenian Catholic Church
- Grégoire Aslan (1908–1982), Armenian actor
- Grégoire Barrère (born 1994), French tennis player
- Grégoire Bélanger (1889–1957), Canadian politician of Quebec
- Gregoire Boonzaier (1909–2005), South African artist
- Grégoire Bouillier (born 1960), French memoirist
- Grégoire Colin (born 1975), French actor
- Grégoire De Mévius (born 1962), Belgian rally driver
- Grégoire Kayibanda (1924–1976), President of Rwanda
- Grégoire Laourou (died 2026), Beninese politician
- Grégoire Laurent (1906–?), Luxembourgish boxer
- Grégoire Maret (born 1975), Swiss jazz musician
- Grégoire Margotton (born 1969), French sports journalist
- Grégoire Mbida (born 1952), Cameroonian professional footballer
- Grégoire Michonze (1902–1982), Russian-French painter
- Gregoire Ndahimana (born 1952), Rwandan war criminal
- Grégoire Orlyk (1702–1759), French military commander
- Grégoire de Saint-Vincent (1584–1667), Flemish Jesuit mathematician
- Grégoire Świderski (born 2005), Canadian soccer player

== See also ==
- Gregoire (chimpanzee), Africa's oldest known chimpanzee
- Saint-Grégoire (disambiguation)
