= Duck Pond (disambiguation) =

A duck pond is a pond for ducks and other waterfowl.

Duck Pond or Duckpond may also refer to:

- Duck Pond (Judges Guild), a fantasy role-playing game
- Ducky Pond (1902–1982), American football and baseball player
- Duck Pond Run, a river in New Jersey, United States
- Duck Pond mine, a closed Canadian mine
- Duck Ponds, South Australia
- Lara, Victoria, formerly known as "Duck Ponds"
- Northeast Gainesville Residential District, an area locally known as "Duckpond" in Gainesville, Florida, United States
- Lake Gregory (Queensland) or The Duckpond, a small impoundment in Queensland, Australia
