= Pope Gregory =

Gregory has been the name of sixteen popes of the Catholic Church and two antipopes:

- Pope Gregory I ("the Great"; saint; 590–604), after whom the Gregorian chant is named
- Pope Gregory II (saint; 715–731)
- Pope Gregory III (saint; 731–741)
- Pope Gregory IV (827–844)
- Pope Gregory V (996–999)
  - Antipope Gregory VI (1012)
- Pope Gregory VI (1045–1046)
- Pope Gregory VII (saint; 1073–1085), after whom the Gregorian Reform is named
  - Antipope Gregory VIII (1118–1121)
- Pope Gregory VIII (1187)
- Pope Gregory IX (1227–1241)
- Pope Gregory X (blessed; 1271–1276)
- Pope Gregory XI (1370–1378)
- Pope Gregory XII (1406–1415)
- Pope Gregory XIII (1572–1585), after whom the Gregorian calendar is named
- Pope Gregory XIV (1590–1591)
- Pope Gregory XV (1621–1623)
- Pope Gregory XVI (1831–1846)

== See also ==
- Clemente Domínguez y Gómez (1946–2005), Antipope Gregory XVII of the Palmarian Catholic Church
- Ginés Jesús Hernández (born 1959), former Antipope Gregory XVIII of the Palmarian Catholic Church
- Greg Pope (born 1960), British Labour Party politician
- Gregory (disambiguation)
- Saint Gregory (disambiguation)
- Gregorian (disambiguation)
