= Gregoire (disambiguation) =

Gregoire is a surname and given name.

Gregoire may also refer to:

== Places ==
- Gregoire Lake (disambiguation)
- Gregoire River, a river in Alberta, Canada
- Lake Gregoire, a fluvial lake on the Faucher River in Mauricie, Quebec, Canada

== Other uses ==
- Gregoire (chimpanzee) (1942–2008)
- Gregoire (film), a Canadian film
- Automobiles Grégoire, a French automotive company
- Hotchkiss Grégoire, a French automobile

== See also ==
- Saint-Grégoire (disambiguation)
- Gregor (disambiguation)
- Gregores (disambiguation)
- Gregory (disambiguation)
- Greg (disambiguation)
