= Nicola Cherry =

Canadian occupational epidemiologist

- Born: 1945 (age 80–81)

Academic background
- Education: PhD, University of London; MS, MD, McGill University
- Thesis: Organic brain damage and occupational solvent exposure (1991)

Academic work
- Institutions: University of Alberta; University of Manchester

Nicola Mary Cherry (born 1945) is a Canadian occupational epidemiologist. As a professor in the Department of Preventive Medicine at the University of Alberta, Cherry has studied the effects natural disasters and pandemics have had on the population and crisis workers. In 2012, she established the Foundation Course in Occupational Medicine for Community-Based Physicians.

== Early life and education ==
Cherry was born in 1945 and earned her Master's degree and Medical degree from McGill University and her PhD from the University of London.

== Career ==
After obtaining a PhD in occupational psychology from the University of London, Cherry travelled to the United Kingdom to work with the UK Medical Research Council and at the Institute for Occupational Health at the London School of Hygiene & Tropical Medicine. She also served as Director of the Centre of Occupational and Environmental Health at the University of Manchester. In this role, she led a study to the gauge the impact of Gulf War syndrome on 6000 veterans against 6000 control groups.

Upon returning to Canada, Cherry worked at the Provincial Research Institute for Health and Safety at Work and then at her alma mater McGill in their Department of Epidemiology, Biostatistics and Occupational Health. In 2012, she moved to Alberta and accepted a faculty position at the University of Alberta. In 2012, Cherry co-established the Foundation Course in Occupational Medicine for Community-Based Physicians with colleagues from the Department of Medicine. The online course was aimed at helping community-based physicians recognize problems as being occupational and how to best handle the injury or disease. She also led a study examining the accuracy of the guidelines from the National Institute for Clinical Excellence on men with infertility. Her research team interviewed 2,249 men from 14 fertility clinics which were then compared between 939 men who ejaculated low numbers of swimming sperm and a control group of 1,310 men. As a result, they found that many common lifestyle choices make little difference to male fertility. As a result of her academic accomplishments, Cherry received the 2014 Meritorious Service Award from the Occupational and Environmental Medical Association of Canada.

In response to the 2016 Fort McMurray wildfire, Cherry and her research team started tracking the health of firefighters assisting during the crisis. Using a mobile laboratory, she took samples of their blood, urine and breath with the goal of following up in three months to study the long-term impacts of the smoke. She found that firefighters were exposed to heavy amounts of polycyclic aromatic hydrocarbons (PAH) during the early days of the Fort McMurray fire, resulting in ongoing respiratory problems. Cherry suggested that showering and changing clothes more frequently would help reduce the amount of carcinogens exposed to firefighters.

During the COVID-19 pandemic in Canada, Cherry led a study similar to that of her Fort McMurray wildfire one in which she studied the relationship between personal protective equipment and physical health. In September, she received a $1 million grant from the Canadian government's Immunity Task Force to study the effects the pandemic had on the mental health of health care workers across Canada and their exposure to the virus. They conducted a three-phase study of over 5,000 health-care workers in Alberta, British Columbia, Ontario and Quebec, including physicians personal support workers and nurses and health-care aides. The aim of the study was to find out how many health-care workers have antibodies to the virus that causes COVID-19 and to identify workplace practices and supports that could reduce stress.
