= Gregor (disambiguation) =

Gregor is a male given name.

Gregor may also refer to:

- Gregor (surname)
- Gregor (musician) (1898–1971), Ottoman-French musician
- GREGOR Solar Telescope
- Gregor GR-1 airplane

== See also ==
- St. Gregor, Saskatchewan, Canada
- Gregor MacGregor (disambiguation)
- MacGregor (disambiguation)
- McGregor (disambiguation)
- Gregoire (disambiguation)
- Gregores (disambiguation)
- Gregory (disambiguation)
- Greg (disambiguation)
