= Anzac, Alberta =

Anzac
- Hamlet
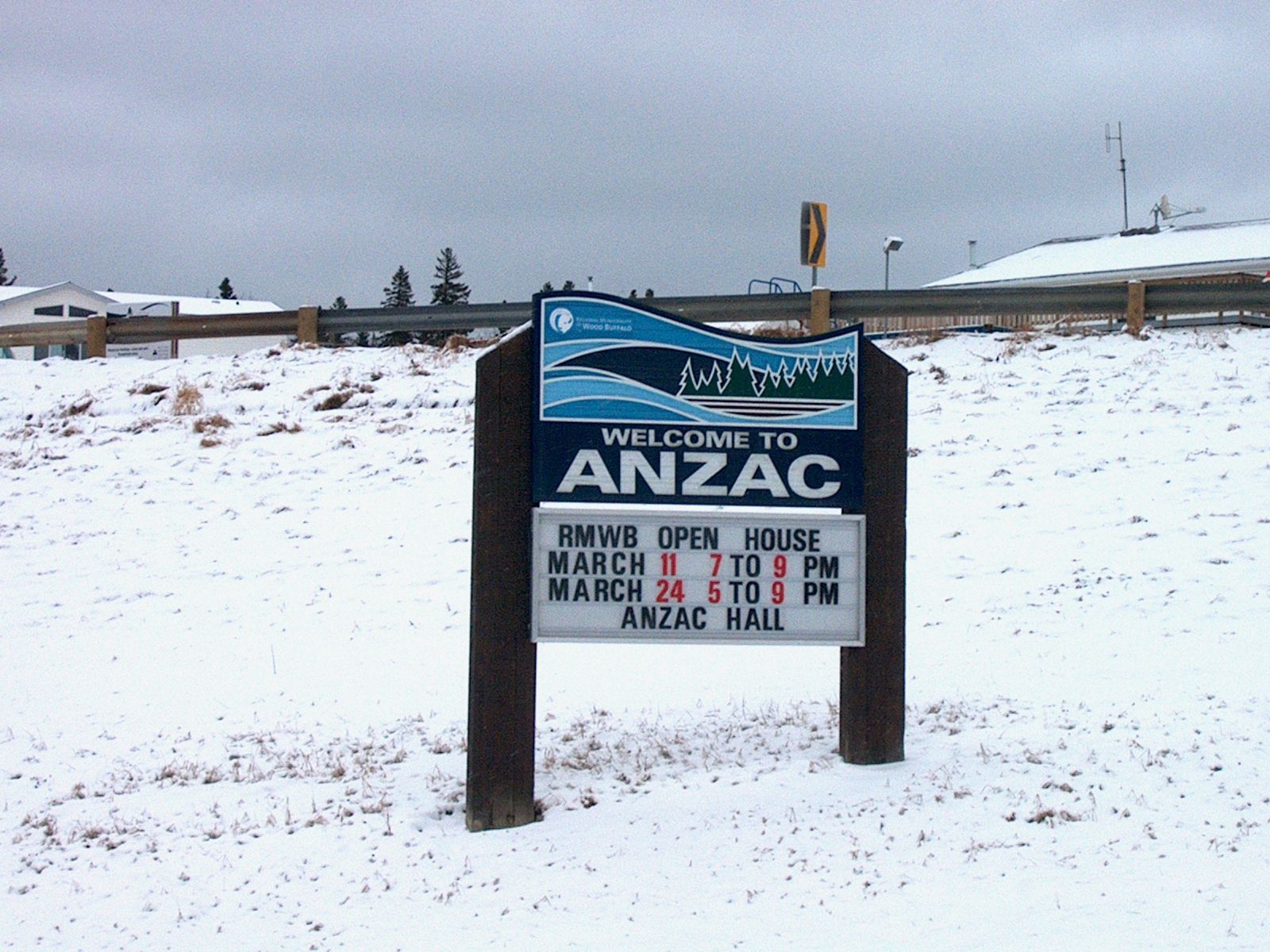
- Anzac welcome sign

- Location of Anzac in Alberta
- Coordinates: 56°26′47″N 111°2′50″W
- Country: Canada
- Province: Alberta
- Region: Northern Alberta
- Census division: 16
- Specialized municipality: RM of Wood Buffalo
- Established: August 7, 1979
- Founder: Alberta and Great Waterways Railway
- Named for: Australian and New Zealand Army Corps

Government
  - Mayor: Sandy Bowman
  - Governing body: Wood Buffalo Municipal Council: Mike Allen; Ty Brandt; Lance Bussieres; Luana Bussieres; Don Scott; Jennifer Vardy; Kendrick Cardinal; Greg "Cowboy" Marcel; Stu Wigle; Kyle Vandecasteyen

Area (2021)
  - Land: 8.57 km^{2} (3.31 sq mi)
- Elevation: 490 m (1,610 ft)

Population (2021)
  - Total: 506
  - Density: 59/km^{2} (150/sq mi)
- Time zone: UTC−06:00
- Postal code: T0P 1J0
- Area code: +1-780
- Website: RM of Wood Buffalo page

Anzac is a hamlet in northern Alberta, Canada within the Regional Municipality (RM) of Wood Buffalo. It is located on Highway 881 along the east shore of Gregoire Lake, approximately 36 kilometres (22 mi) southeast of Fort McMurray.

== History ==
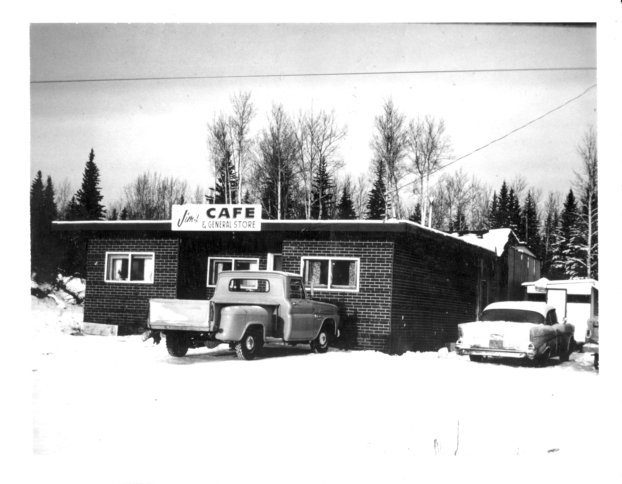
Cafe in Anzac, 1960s

Anzac was named for the Australian and New Zealand Army Corps during World War I, when the Alberta and Great Waterways Railway was being built from Carbondale to Waterways.

Originally named after Willow Lake, the previous name of Gregoire Lake, the community were mostly non-status or non-treaty Cree whose ancestors had migrated to the Athabasca Basin area from what was to become northern Manitoba, mostly displacing the original Beaver and Chipewyan occupants of the area.

During World War II a road was built from the rail siding to service and construct a US Army base on Stoney Mountain.

The area has seen significant growth corresponding to that of Fort McMurray and the oil industry.

The hamlet was ordered to be evacuated on May 5, 2016, due to the spread of the 2016 Fort McMurray wildfire.

== Demographics ==
Population history of Anzac
Year	Pop.	±%
1951	40	—
1956	84	+110.0%
1961	154	+83.3%
1966	224	+45.5%
1971	114	−49.1%
1976	138	+21.1%
1981	165	+19.6%
1986	231	+40.0%
1991	272	+17.7%
1996	297	+9.2%
2001	460	+54.9%
2006	601	+30.7%
2011	585	−2.7%
2016	548	−6.3%
2021	506	−7.7%
Source: Statistics Canada

In the 2021 Census of Population conducted by Statistics Canada, Anzac had a population of 506 living in 190 of its 256 total private dwellings, a change of −7.7% from its 2016 population of 548. With a land area of 8.57 km^{2} (3.31 sq mi), it had a population density of 59.0/km^{2} (152.9/sq mi) in 2021.

The population of Anzac according to the 2018 municipal census conducted by the Regional Municipality of Wood Buffalo is 659, an increase from its 2015 municipal census population count of 606.

As a designated place in the 2016 Census of Population conducted by Statistics Canada, Anzac had a population of 548 living in 197 of its 286 total private dwellings, a change of −6.3% from its 2011 population of 585. With a land area of 8.56 km^{2} (3.31 sq mi), it had a population density of 64.0/km^{2} (165.8/sq mi) in 2016.

== Notable ==
- Tantoo Cardinal, veteran actress

== See also ==
- List of communities in Alberta
- List of designated places in Alberta
- List of hamlets in Alberta
