= Gregory =

Gregory may refer to:

== People and fictional characters ==
- Gregory (given name), including a list of people and fictional characters with the given name
- Gregory (surname), a surname

== Places ==
=== Australia ===
- Gregory, a town in the Northern Territory
- Gregory, Queensland, a town in the Shire of Burke
  - Electoral district of Gregory, Queensland
- Gregory, Western Australia

=== United States ===
- Gregory, Minnesota, in Morrison County
- Gregory Township, Mahnomen County, Minnesota
- Gregory, South Dakota
- Gregory, Texas

=== Outer space ===
- Gregory (lunar crater)
- Gregory (Venusian crater)

== Other uses ==
- "Gregory" (The Americans), the third episode of the first season of the television series The Americans

== See also ==
- Greg (disambiguation)
- Greggory
- Gregoire (disambiguation)
- Gregor (disambiguation)
- Gregores (disambiguation)
- Gregorian (disambiguation)
- Gregory County (disambiguation)
- Gregory Highway, Queensland
- Gregory National Park, Northern Territory
- Gregory River in the Shire of Burke, Queensland
- Justice Gregory (disambiguation)
- Lake Gregory (disambiguation)
