= Lake Gregory =

Lake Gregory may refer to:

- Lake Gregory (South Australia)
- Lake Gregory (Western Australia)
- Lake Gregory (Queensland), Australia, also known as Isis Balancing Storage
- Gregory Lake (La Jacques-Cartier), Quebec, Canada
- Lake Gregory (California), United States
- Lake Gregory (Nuwara Eliya), Sri Lanka

== See also ==
- Gregory (disambiguation)
- Gregoire Lake (disambiguation)
