= Gregorian =

Gregorian may refer to:

- The thought or ideology of Pope Gregory I or Pope Gregory VII (also called Gregorianism)
- Things named for Pope Gregory I:
  - Gregorian chant, the central tradition of Western plainchant, a form of monophonic, unaccompanied sacred song of the western Roman Catholic Church
  - Gregorian mass
  - Brotherhood of Saint Gregory, a community of friars within the Anglican Communion. The community's members, known as "Gregorians", include clergy and laymen. Since 1987 there has also been a parallel order of sisters, the Sisters of Saint Gregory
  - Gregorian Antiphonary, an early Christian antiphonary, i.e. book of choral music to be sung antiphonally in services; it is associated traditionally with Pope Gregory I
  - Gregorian Sacramentary, a 10th-century illuminated Latin manuscript containing a sacramentary. Since the 16th century it has been in the Vatican Library as Lat. 3806
- Things named for Pope Gregory VII:
  - The Gregorian Reform, a series of reforms initiated by Pope Gregory VII and the circle he formed in the papal curia, c. 1050–80, which dealt with the moral integrity and independence of the clergy
- Things named for Pope Gregory XIII:
  - Gregorian calendar, internationally the most widely used civil calendar. Pope Gregory XIII introduced it in October 1582
  - Pontifical Gregorian University, Rome
  - Gregorian Tower, a round tower located above the Gallery of Maps, which connects the Villa Belvedere with the Apostolic Palace in Vatican City
- The Armenian Apostolic Church, sometimes called the Gregorian Church after Saint Gregory the Illuminator
- The Gregorian telescope, named after James Gregory
- Gregorian (band), German band that performs Gregorian chant-inspired versions of modern pop and rock songs
- Gregorian Consortium, a collaborative association of three pontifical universities/institutes in Rome
- Gregorian (horse)

== People ==
- Arthur T. Gregorian (1909–2003), Greater Boston oriental rug dealer and author of books on oriental rugs, and considered to be the world's leading collector of rare, inscribed Armenian rugs
- Joyce Ballou Gregorian (1946–1991), American author, expert on Oriental rugs, and lover of Arabian horses
- Mike Gregorian, American former soccer player who earned one cap with the U.S. national team in 1988
- Vartan Gregorian (1934–2021), Iranian-born Armenian-American academic, serving as the president of Carnegie Corporation of New York
- Gregorian Bivolaru (born 1952), founder of the Movement for Spiritual Integration into the Absolute (MISA)
