= Saint Gregory (disambiguation) =

Saint Gregory, also Pope Gregory I or Gregory the Dialogist (c. 540 – 604), was Pope from 590 until his death.

Saint Gregory may also refer to:

- Gregory Thaumaturgus, (Gregory the Wonderworker), or Gregory of Neocaesarea (died 270)
- Gregory of Spoleto (died 304)
- Gregory the Illuminator, or Gregory the Enlightener (died 331), Parthian saint, founder of the Armenian Apostolic Church
- Gregory of Nazianzus the Elder (died 373), bishop of Nazianzus, father of Gregory the Theologian and Caesarius of Nazianzus
- Gregory of Nazianzus, or Gregory the Theologian (died 390), one of the Three Holy Hierarchs
- Gregory of Nyssa (died after 394), Bishop of Nyssa
- Gregory of Tours (died 594), Gallo-Roman historian and Bishop of Tours
- Pope Gregory II (died 731), Pope from 715 to his death
- Pope Gregory III (died 741), Pope from 731 to his death
- Gregory of Utrecht, (died c. 770), German bishop
- Gregory of Dekapolis (died 816), Byzantine monk
- Gregory of Crete (Gregory of Akrita, died 820), Cretan saint venerated January 5
- Gregory of Narek (died c. 1003): Armenian monk and mystic
- Gregory of Moesia, (died 1012), Bulgarian bishop venerated January 8
- Pope Gregory VII (died 1085), Pope from 1073 to his death
- Gregory the Wonderworker of the Kiev Near Caves (died 1093), Kievan saint venerated January 8
- Gregory the Iconographer (12th century), Kievan iconographer and saint venerated August 8
- Gregory of Assos (died 1150), Bishop of Assos, venerated March 4
- Gregory of Novgorod (died 1193), Archbishop of Novgorod, venerated May 24
- Gregory of Nicomedia (died 1240), Byzantine ascetic and saint venerated April 2
- Gregory the Byzantine (died 1310), Byzantine monk and saint venerated April 6
- Gregory of Sinai (died 1347), Byzantine monk
- Gregory the Singer (died 1355), Byzantine monk and saint venerated October 1
- Gregory Palamas (died 1359), Archbishop of Thessalonica
- Gregory the Hermit (14th century), Kievan saint venerated January 8
- Gregory (14th century), founder of Osiou Gregoriou monastery
- Gregory of Rostov (died 1416), Abbott of Kamenny Monastery and Archbishop of Rostov, Yiaroslavl and White Lake, venerated May 3
- Gregory of Pelsheme (died 1442), Abbot of Pelsheme and Wonderworker of Vologda, venerated September 30
- Patriarch Gregory V of Constantinople (1746–1821), Ecumenical Patriarch of Constantinople
- Geevarghese Gregorios of Parumala (1848-1902), Bishop of Parumala
- Gregory (Orologas) of Kydonies (1864–1922), Metropolitan of Cydoniae
- Grigol Peradze (1899–1942), Georgian Archimandrite

== See also ==
- Gregory (disambiguation)
- Pope Gregory (disambiguation)
