= Mount McGregor =

Mount McGregor or variation, may refer to:

- Mount McGregor Correctional Facility, a former New York State prison
- Mount McGregor (mountain), a mountain in the town of Wilton, New York, USA
- Mount McGregor (Selkirk Mountains), a mountain in the Nelson Range of the Selkirk Mountains, British Columbia, Canada
- McGregor Mountain (Washington), USA; a mountain
- McGregor Mountain, (New York), USA; a mountain in Stamford, New York, USA

== See also ==
- McGregor Plateau, Nechaka Plateau, Interior Plateau, British Columbia, Canada; a mountainous plateau
- McGregor Range, Central Interior, British Columbia, Canada; a mountain range
- McGregor (disambiguation)
