= Al Khamsa (organization) =

U.S. nonprofit organization

Al Khamsa is a nonprofit organization in the United States that supports the preservation breeding of certain strains of purebred Arabian horses, specifically lines tracing exclusively to those pedigrees providing a detailed chain of evidence to prove they were bred by the Bedouin of the Arabian Peninsula. The name derives from the Al Khamsa ("the five") Arabian mares, the name applied to the legendary five favorite horses of Mohammed. The particular purpose of Al Khamsa is to "preserve the original Bedouin Arabian horse in pure bloodlines in North America."

"Since 1976, Al Khamsa, Inc. has engendered wide-ranging prototypes for constructive, organized preservationist activities. Of paramount importance has been the development of guidelines for identifying, classifying, and studying desertbred Arab horses, all of which have been presented in an Al Khamsa series of books and magazines."

Some of the pure Arabians in the United States trace their ancestry in whole or part to the Davenport horses collected and preserved by Homer Davenport and others in the late nineteenth century. Others are more recent imports from Egypt. Some of the horses imported from the desert to the Crabbet Arabian Stud by Wilfrid Blunt and Lady Anne Blunt also qualify with this designation.
