= McGregor =

McGregor may refer to:

== People ==
- McGregor (surname)
- Clan MacGregor, a Scottish highland clan
- McGregor W. Scott (born 1962), U.S. attorney

== Places ==
in Canada:

- McGregor Lake, Alberta; a lake
- McGregor, British Columbia
- McGregor Plateau, Nechaka Plateau, Interior Plateau, British Columbia; a mountainous plateau
- McGregor Range, Central Interior, British Columbia; a mountain range
- McGregor Pass, Continental Divide, British Columbia; a mountain pass
- McGregor River, British Columbia; a river
- McGregor, Ontario

in South Africa:

- McGregor, Western Cape

in the United States:

- McGregor, Florida
- McGregor, Georgia
- McGregor, Iowa
- McGregor Heights, Iowa
- McGregor, Minnesota
- McGregor Township, Aitkin County, Minnesota
- Mount McGregor (mountain), New York
- McGregor, North Dakota
- McGregor, Armstrong County, Pennsylvania
- McGregor, Texas
  - McGregor Independent School District
- McGregor Mountain (Washington)

elsewhere:

- McGregor Glacier, Prince Olav Mountains, Antarctica
- Sir Arthur McGregor Municipality, Anzoátegui, Venezuela
- McGregor Street, Wan Chai, Hong Kong Island, Victoria, Hong Kong, China

=== Facilities and structures ===
- McGregor station (British Columbia), Canada; a train station
- McGregor (Port Gibson, Mississippi), USA; a house listed on the U.S. National Register of Historic Places
- McGregor Links, a golf course in Saratoga Springs, New York, USA
- McGregor High School (Minnesota), USA
- McGregor High School (Texas), USA
- McGregor station (Texas), USA; a train station

== Other uses ==
- "McGregor" (song), a 2021 song by 'Anuel AA' off the album Las Leyendas Nunca Mueren
- McGregor and Company, a heavy engineering company of New Zealand

== See also ==
- Mount McGregor (disambiguation)
- MacGregor (disambiguation)
- Gregor (disambiguation)
