= Draper, Alberta =

Canadian community

Coordinates: 56°40′24″N 111°15′30″W

Location of Draper Alberta

Draper is an unincorporated community in northern Alberta, Canada within the Regional Municipality (R.M.) of Wood Buffalo. It is located approximately 12 km (7.5 mi) southeast of Fort McMurray on the southern bank of the Clearwater River. The community consists mainly of acreages.

== History ==
Draper was founded in 1922 and named for Thomas Draper, who operated a quarry in the area and established the McMurray Asphaltum and Oil Company. It was affected by the 2016 Fort McMurray Wildfire.

== Demographics ==
The population of Draper in 2012 was 197 according to a municipal census conducted by the R.M of Wood Buffalo.

== See also ==
- List of communities in Alberta
