= Gregores =

Gregores or Gregore or variation, may refer to:

== Characters ==
- Count Gregore, an onscreen TV persona of KFOR-TV
- Space Fighter Gregore, a character from episode 31 of Ultraman Dyna
- Gregore, Mayor of Lupusville, a character from The Real Ghostbusters; see List of The Real Ghostbusters episodes

== People ==
- Gregore J. Sambor (1928–2015), U.S. police commissioner
- Gregore de Magalhães da Silva (born 1994), Brazilian soccer player
- Juan Manuel Gregores, governor of the Territory of Santa Cruz; namesake of Gobernador Gregores, Santa Cruz, Argentina

== Places ==
- Gobernador Gregores, a town in Santa Cruz, Argentina
  - Gobernador Gregores Airport (Gregores Airport)
    - Gobernador Gregores Beacon, located on the airport field

== See also ==
- David McGregore (1710–1777), Presbyterian minister in colonial New England
- Gregoire (disambiguation)
- Gregor (disambiguation)
- Gregory (disambiguation)
- Greg (disambiguation)
