= MacGregor =

MacGregor or Macgregor may refer to:

== People ==
- MacGregor (surname)
- MacGregor (filmmaker), a Spanish commercial cinematographer and film director
- Clan Gregor, a Scottish clan
- Macgregor baronets, related individuals including a British Army Brigadier General

== Places ==
- Macgregor, Australian Capital Territory, Australia
- MacGregor, Queensland, Australia
- MacGregor, Manitoba, Canada
  - MacGregor Airport
- MacGregor Point Provincial Park, Ontario, Canada

== Other uses ==
- MacGregor Medal, a military award given for contributions to reconnaissance, exploration, and adventure
- MacGregor Golf, a manufacturer of golf equipment, accessories and apparel
- MacGregor International AB, a Finnish company that makes cargo-handling machinery
- MacGregor Yacht Corporation, a defunct manufacturer of sailing yachts

== See also ==
- McGregor (disambiguation)
- Gregor (disambiguation)
