= Greggory =

Greggory is both a surname and a given name. Notable people with the name include:

- Pascal Greggory (born 1954), French actor
- Greggory Nations, American television writer and script coordinator

== See also ==
- Gregory (disambiguation)
