= 2016 Fort McMurray wildfire =

Natural disaster in Alberta, Canada

2016 Fort McMurray wildfire Horse River Fire
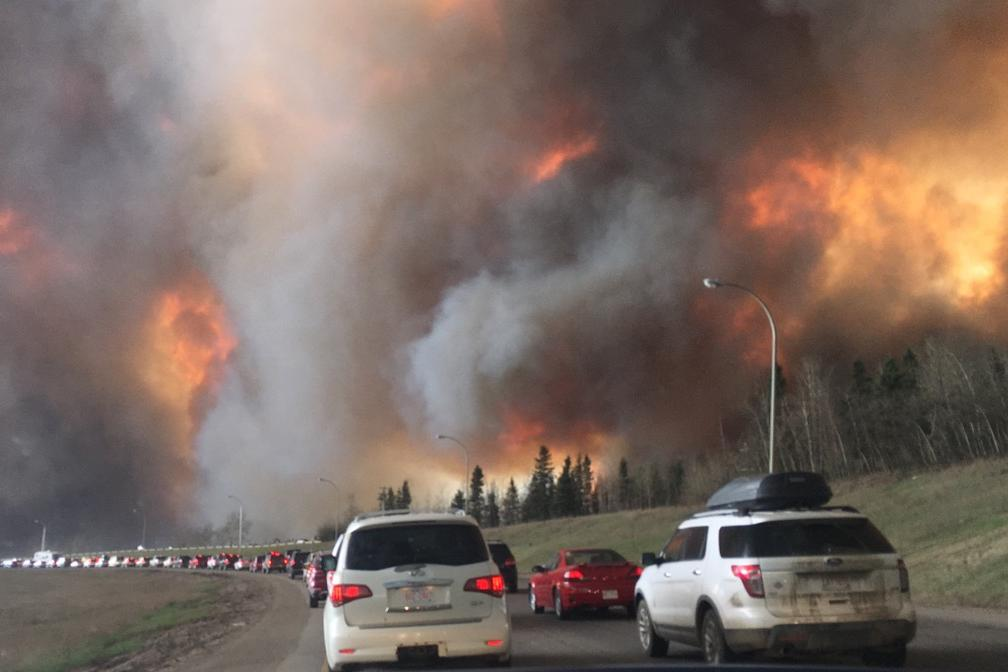
- Fort McMurray residents evacuating along Highway 63 as the fire encroaches on the area
- Date: May 1, 2016 – August 2, 2017 Evacuation: May 3 – June 1, 2016 Provincial state of emergency: May 4 – July 1, 2016
- Location: Wood Buffalo, Alberta; Northern Saskatchewan; Canada
- Coordinates: 56°39′55″N 111°23′00″W

Statistics
- Burned area: 589,552 ha (1,456,810 acres)
- Land use: Boreal forest, Residential, Oil Sands

Impacts
- Deaths: 0 (direct); 2 (indirect)
- Injuries: 0
- Structures destroyed: 3,244
- Cost: C$9.9 billion (US$7.61 billion)

Map
- Map
- Location in Alberta

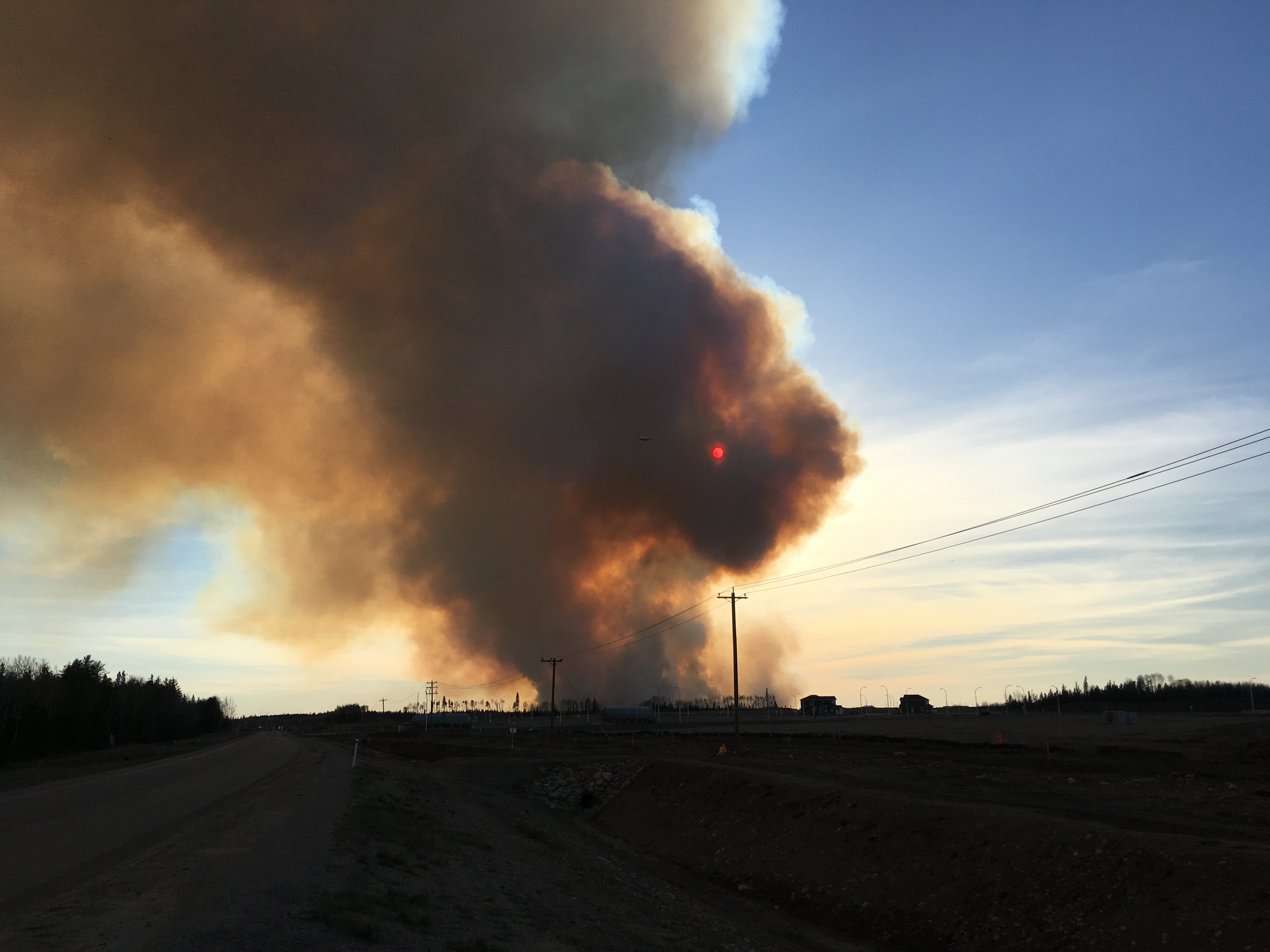
The wildfire burning near Fort McMurray on May 1, 2016

On May 1, 2016, a wildfire began southwest of Fort McMurray, Alberta, Canada. On May 3, it swept through the community, forcing the largest wildfire evacuation in Alberta's history, with upwards of 88,000 people forced from their homes. Firefighters were assisted by personnel from both the Canadian Armed Forces and Royal Canadian Mounted Police, as well as other Canadian provincial agencies, to fight the wildfire. Aid for evacuees was provided by various governments and via donations through the Canadian Red Cross and other local and national charitable organizations.

Sweeping through Fort McMurray, the wildfire destroyed approximately 2,400 homes and buildings. Another 2,000 residents in three communities were displaced after their homes were declared unsafe for reoccupation due to contamination. The fire continued to spread across northern Alberta and into Saskatchewan, consuming forested areas and impacting Athabasca oil sands operations. With an estimated damage cost of C$9.9 billion (US$7.61 billion), it was the costliest disaster in Canadian history.

The fire spread across approximately 590,000 ha (1,500,000 acres) before it was declared to be under control on July 5, 2016. It continued to smoulder, and was fully extinguished on August 2, 2017. It is suspected to have been caused by humans in a remote area 15 km (9.3 mi) from Fort McMurray, but no official cause has been determined to date. Author John Vaillant documented a detailed account of the fire, its progression, and aftermath within the context of global warming in his best-seller book Fire Weather: On the Front Lines of a Burning World.

== Fire progression ==
=== Cause and contributing factors ===
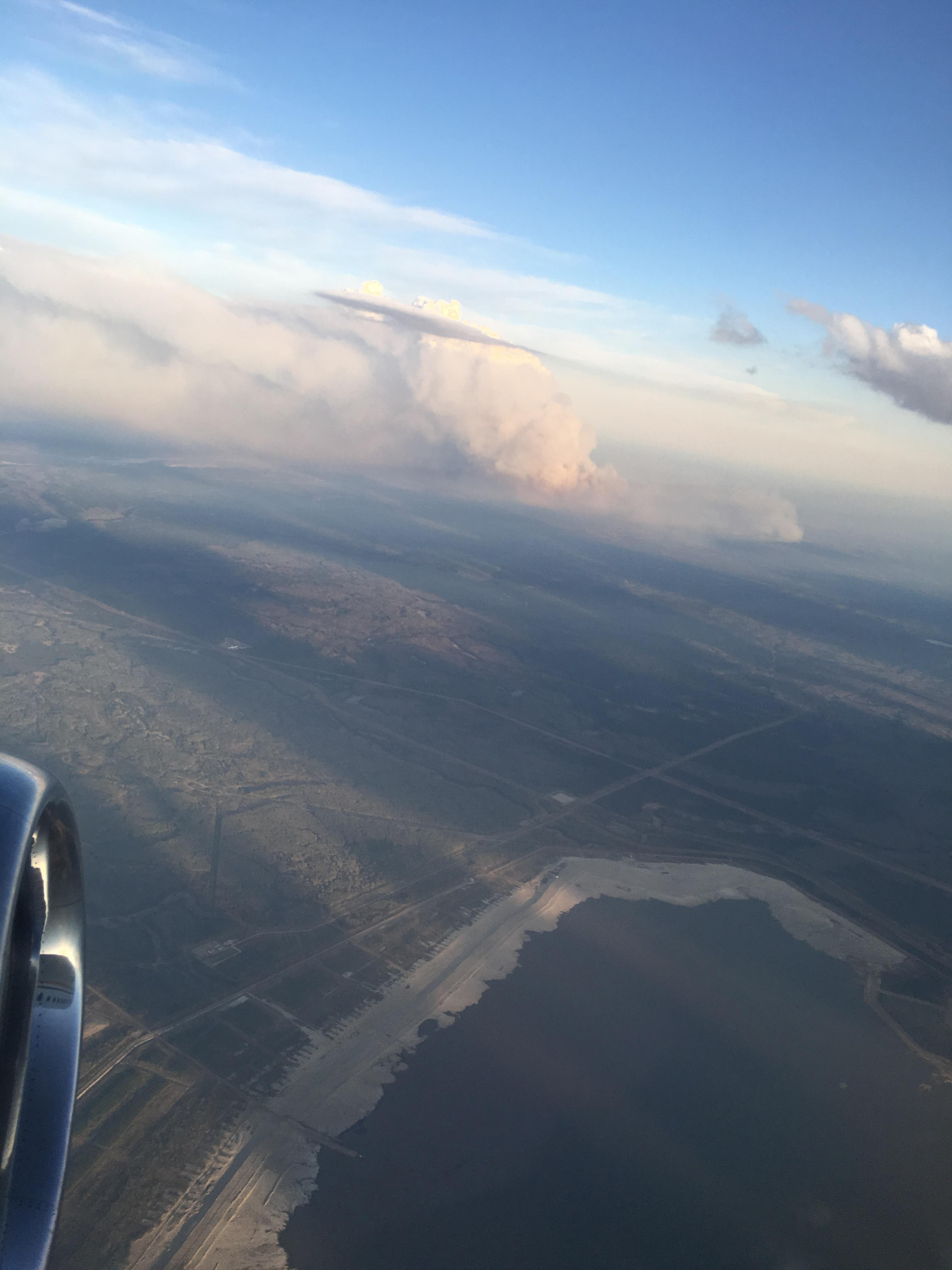
Aerial view of the flammagenitus cloud created by the fire.

The fire was first reported by a helicopter forestry crew in a remote area 15 km (9.3 mi) from Fort McMurray on May 1, 2016. First responders arrived 45 minutes later. An official cause of the fire has not been determined, but it was suspected to be human caused. During the start of the fire, an unusually hot, dry air mass was in place over Northern Alberta, which brought record-setting temperatures to Fort McMurray. On May 3, the temperature climbed to 32.8 °C (91 °F), accompanied by relative humidity as low as 12%. The situation intensified on May 4 when temperatures reached 31.9 °C (89 °F) and winds gusted to 72 km/h (45 mph). A natural El Niño cycle also led to a dry fall and winter season along with a warm spring, leaving a paltry snowpack, which melted quickly. Combined with the high temperatures, this created a "perfect storm" of conditions for an explosive wildfire, and significantly contributed to the fire's rapid growth.

Climate change was also cited as a potential contributor to the start and spread of the fire. Debate occurred as to whether it was "insensitive" to discuss it during the crisis, or whether the crisis made it "more important" to talk about a correlation between human-influenced climate change and wildfires. Canada's politicians and scientists both cautioned that individual fires cannot specifically be linked to climate change, but agree that it is part of a general trend of more intense wildfires.

=== Spread to Fort McMurray ===
As the fire spread towards settlements in Fort McMurray, a local state of emergency was declared on May 1 at 9:57 p.m. MDT (03:57 UTC May 2) with the Centennial Trailer Park and the neighborhoods of Prairie Creek and Gregoire under a mandatory evacuation. The evacuation orders for the two neighborhoods were reduced to a voluntary stay-in-place order by the night of May 2 as the fire moved southwest and away from the area. The mandatory evacuation order was reinstated and expanded to 12 neighbourhoods on May 3 at 5:00 p.m. (23:00 UTC), and to the entirety of Fort McMurray by 6:49 p.m. (00:49 UTC May 4). A further order covering the nearby communities of Anzac, Gregoire Lake Estates, and Fort McMurray First Nation was issued at 9:50 p.m. on May 4 (03:50 UTC May 5). It has been reported that 88,000 people were successfully evacuated, with no reported fatalities or injuries, but two people, Aaron Hodgson and Emily Ryan, were killed in a vehicular collision during the evacuation, one of whom was the daughter of a firefighter. Despite the mandatory evacuation order, staff at the water treatment plant remained in Fort McMurray to provide firefighters with water.

On May 4, the Regional Municipality of Wood Buffalo reported the communities of Beacon Hill, Abasand and Waterways had suffered "serious loss". The Government of Alberta declared a provincial state of emergency, and said 1,600 buildings had been destroyed by the fires. It was estimated that 10,000 ha (25,000 acres) of land had been burned. Evacuees who travelled north of Fort McMurray were advised to stay where they were, and not to come south on Highway 63 as the fire was still burning out of control. A boil-water advisory was issued for the entire area just after 11 a.m. (17:00 UTC). At 4:05 p.m., (22:05 UTC) the fire crossed Highway 63 at Airport Road (formerly Highway 69), south of Fort McMurray, and threatened the international airport, which had suspended commercial operations earlier in the day. The fire also forced the re-location of the Regional Emergency Operations Centre, which was originally in the vicinity of the airport. On May 4, the fire was found to be producing lightning and pyrocumulus clouds due to its heat and large size, which added to the risk of more fires. The fires became large enough to create a firestorm, creating its own weather in the form of wind influxes and lightning.

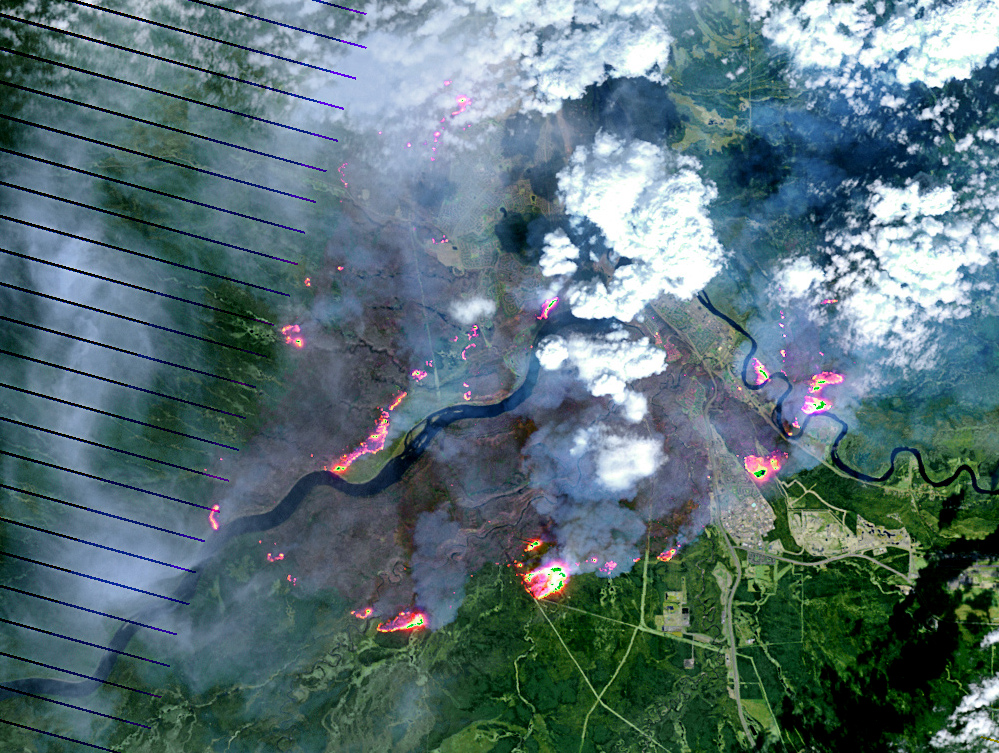
Satellite imagery of the burn scar left by the wildfire on May 4, 2016

The fire continued to spread south on May 5 across 85,000 ha (210,000 acres) and forcing additional evacuations in the communities of Anzac, Gregoire Lake Estates and the Fort McMurray First Nation. These communities had accepted over 8,000 people during the initial evacuations. The Government of Alberta announced a plan to airlift approximately 8,000 of 25,000 people who had evacuated to oil sands work camps north of Fort McMurray, with assistance from a Royal Canadian Air Force Hercules aircraft, and other planes owned by energy companies operating in the oil sands. 1,110 personnel, 145 helicopters, 138 pieces of heavy equipment and 22 air tankers were employed to fight the fire.

On May 6, the Royal Canadian Mounted Police began leading convoys to move 1,500 vehicles from oil sand work camps north of Fort McMurray, south along Highway 63 to Edmonton. The fire continued to grow out of control, spreading to 100,000 ha (250,000 acres) by May 6, and 200,000 ha (490,000 acres) by May 7. As the fire grew to the northeast, the community of Fort McKay, which hosted 5,000 evacuees from Fort McMurray, was itself put under an evacuation notice. Albertan officials anticipated that the fire would double in size, and reach the Saskatchewan border to the east.

=== Remote growth, control and extinguishment ===
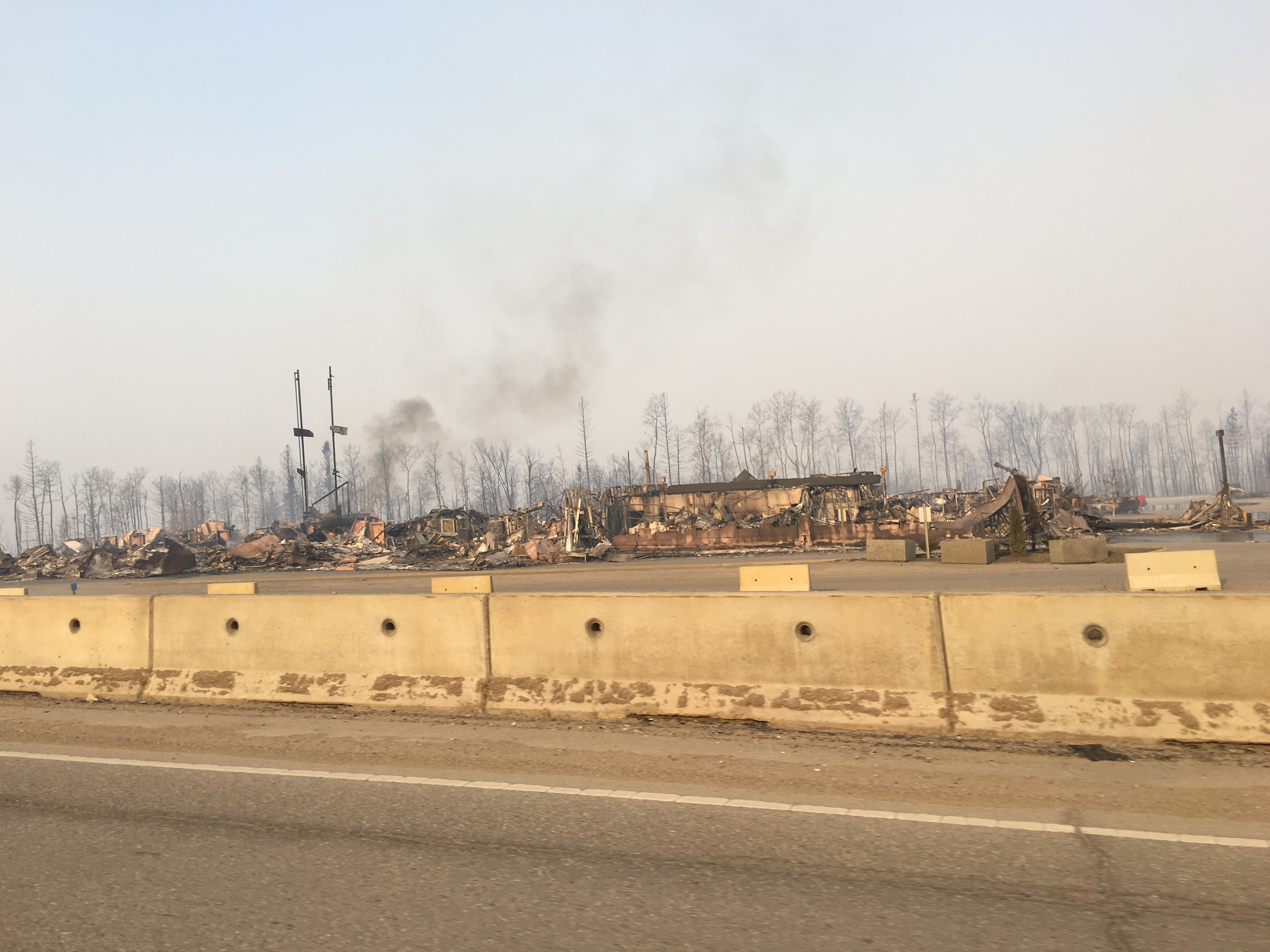
Super 8 motel destroyed by the fire

The wildfire continued to spread through remote forested areas in the following week, reaching oilsand work camps south of Fort MacKay, forcing the evacuation of 19 oil sites and camps with approximately 8,000 workers. One lodge with 665 units was destroyed. The fire continued to grow, from 285,000 ha (700,000 acres) on May 16 to 504,443 ha (1,246,510 acres) on May 21 and even spread across 741 ha (1,830 acres) in Saskatchewan. While the fire moved away from Fort McMurray, two explosions and poor air quality continued to prevent residents and rebuilding crews from returning to the town. By May 18, the fire had grown to 423,000 ha (1,050,000 acres) and expanded into Saskatchewan. By mid-June, rain and cooler temperatures helped firefighters contain the fire, and on July 4, 2016, the fire was declared under control. The wildfire was still considered to be active over the following year, having smouldered in deeper layers of moss and dirt throughout the winter.

On August 2, 2017, with no further detection of hot spots by thermal surveys conducted over the summer, provincial officials declared the wildfire extinguished.

== Response ==
=== Aid response ===
A video of the Government of British Columbia's address to the fire.

The Government of Alberta declared a provincial state of emergency for Fort McMurray on May 4, 2016, and issued a formal request for assistance from the Canadian Armed Forces. The government and the Department of National Defence signed a memorandum of understanding on May 4, detailing required assistance and use of helicopters for rescue operations. Shortly after, a CC-130 Hercules departed CFB Trenton and helicopters were dispatched to the affected area. Alberta also requested assistance from the Government of Ontario, and Ontario committed to sending 100 firefighters and 19 supervisory staff, coordinated through the Canadian Interagency Forest Fire Centre. Other provinces across the country offered support. On May 5, four CL-415 water bombers from Quebec's Service aérien gouvernemental (fr) took off from the province to aid in the firefighting effort. Approximately 300 Royal Canadian Mounted Police officers provided security in the wildfire area.

South Africa sent 301 firefighters at the request of the Canadian Interagency Forest Fire Centre at the end of May. The firefighters were trained during the month of April at a boot camp, in order to learn how to use special hoses instead of the leather-padded wooden sticks known as "firebeaters" they typically use in their home country due to a lack of water. Less than a week after being deployed, the South Africans went on strike over a wage dispute and were demobilized. Alberta Premier Rachel Notley vowed to address the issue and ensure that the firefighters were paid a minimum of C$11.20 per hour as required by the province's labour laws, rather than the C$15 per day allowance specified in their contract with their South African employer.

The Alberta government provided an initial $1,250 per adult and $500 per dependent to cover living expenses for those who had evacuated. On May 4, the provincial government committed to match donations made to the Canadian Red Cross, as well as to donate an additional $2 million as seed money; the federal government pledged to match all donations to the Canadian Red Cross the next day, with a deadline set to May 31. As of May 9, $54 million has been donated to the Red Cross, not including matching government contributions.

On May 4, Public Safety Canada activated the International Charter Space and Major Disasters, thus providing for the charitable and humanitarian re-tasking of the diverse satellite assets of 15 space agencies. Later, Edmonton's Capital Region Housing Corporation (CRHC), along with the City of Edmonton, the Alberta Residential Landlord Association, and Yardi Canada Ltd., announced a partnership to create a registry of rental properties for Fort McMurray evacuees. The non-profit initiative would offer this service free of charge to landlords for the next six months. Some landlords had offered incentives to wildfire evacuees, including reduced security deposits, reduced rent, or free rent for a month or more.

Prime Minister Justin Trudeau visited Fort McMurray on May 13 to survey the damage and promised ongoing aid from the federal government in the coming months. The Governor General, David Johnston, and Sophie, Countess of Wessex, met with first responders and visited the ruins of the Beacon Hill neighbourhood of Fort McMurray on June 24, 2016.

=== Political controversy ===
The Alberta government was criticized for cutting $15 million from the province's wildfire suppression budget in April 2016, just prior to the outbreak of the wildfire. While Premier Rachel Notley contended that wildfires were paid by emergency funds that would not be limited to combat a wildfire, local air tanker companies argued that the cuts created a personnel issue, and would make it more difficult to keep staff on duty during the wildfire season. Cuts were also made to fire preparation budgets, which funded activities such as creating fire breaks, but it is not certain that those activities would have been beneficial against a wildfire powerful enough to traverse the Athabasca River.

The federal government was criticized after international assistance from Australia, Israel, Mexico, the Palestinian Authority, Russia, Taiwan, and the United States was offered in battling the fire, and turned down by Prime Minister Justin Trudeau. Russia specifically offered Ilyushin Il-76 firefighting aircraft that could handle up to 42 tons of fire suppression at one time. Trudeau said that while the offers were appreciated, they were unnecessary as firefighters from other Canadian provinces were gaining control of the situation. Trudeau was also criticized on May 6, 2016, for not visiting Fort McMurray and showing support, less than a week after the fire started. Trudeau responded that "showing up in Fort McMurray, when firefighters are busy trying to contain a massive raging wildfire, is not a particularly helpful thing," and comparisons were drawn to former Prime Minister Stephen Harper's visit to Kelowna, British Columbia the previous year. Trudeau visited Fort McMurray a week later on May 13, 2016.

== Impacts ==
Structures Destroyed in Fort McMurray Neighbourhoods
Name	#
Airport	4
Abasand	1,168
Anzac	12
Beacon Hill	476
Blacksand Lodge	665
Draper	13
Gregoire	4
Lower Townsite	1
Parsons Creek	10
Prairie Creek	1
Saprae Creek	86
Thickwood	187
Timberlea	379
Waterways	238
Total	3,244

=== Communities and infrastructure ===
Initial estimates from May 4 indicated that 1,600 structures in Fort McMurray were destroyed. Firefighters worked through May 6 and 7 to hold the line and protect the downtown and remaining homes in Fort McMurray. On May 9, this figure was revised to 2,400 structures, and about 85 to 90% of the community was reported undamaged. Overnight on May 16–17, two explosions occurred in the Thickwood and Dickensfield neighbourhoods, damaging 10 buildings and destroying three.

The town's power grid sustained damage. Almost the entire Fort McMurray area was placed under a boil-water advisory during the fire, since untreated water was placed into the municipal water system to supply firefighters. The boil water advisory was lifted in all areas of Fort McMurray on August 17, 2016.

Statistics Canada suspended enumeration activities for the 2016 Census in the Fort McMurray area on May 5. Alternative means to collect data from its residents were to be determined at a later date. Some census data was received early, and some residents sent their census data online after the evacuation. Statistics Canada was able to create an accurate 2016 census profile for Fort McMurray using this information, as well as Canada Revenue Agency income tax records, local birth and death records, and long-form census information collected by surveyors going door to door.

The neighbourhoods of Waterways, Abasand, and Beacon Hill saw the heaviest damage from the wildfire. Until debris could be cleared, they were declared unsafe for re-occupation because of contamination from arsenic and heavy metals. Residents did not return to these neighbourhoods until the end of October 2016.

=== Oil sands operations ===
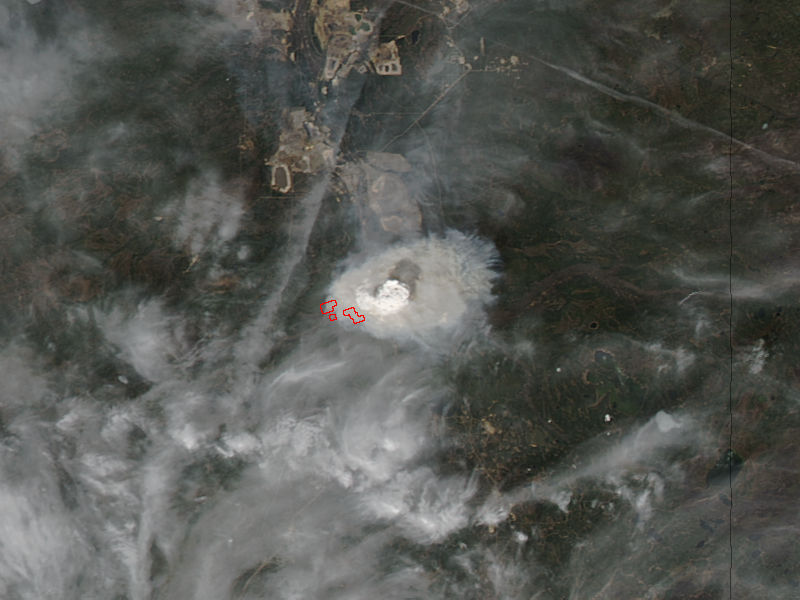
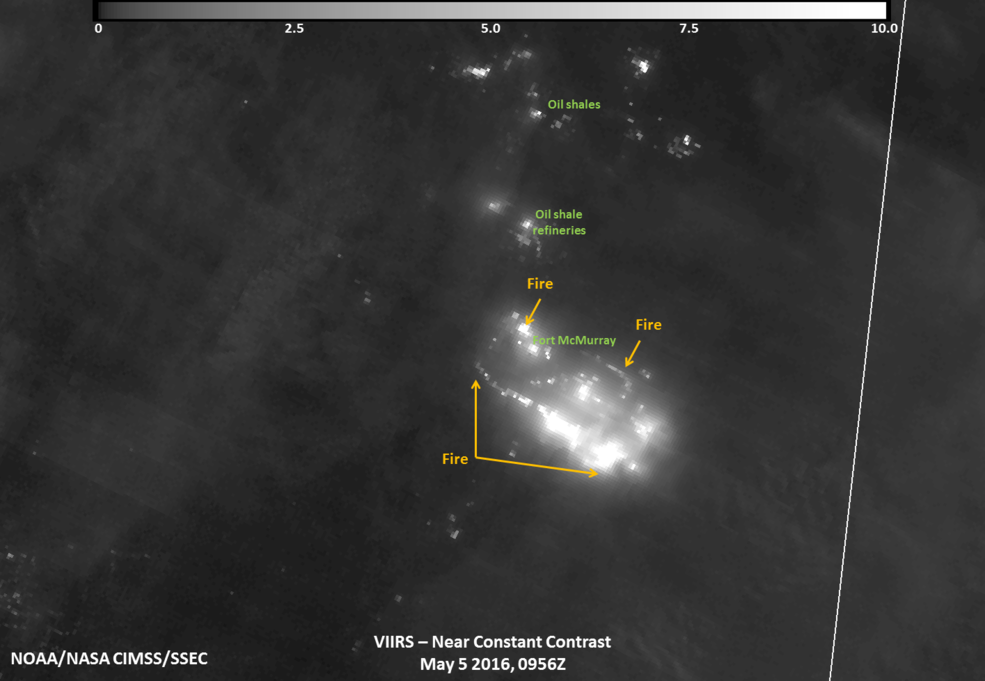
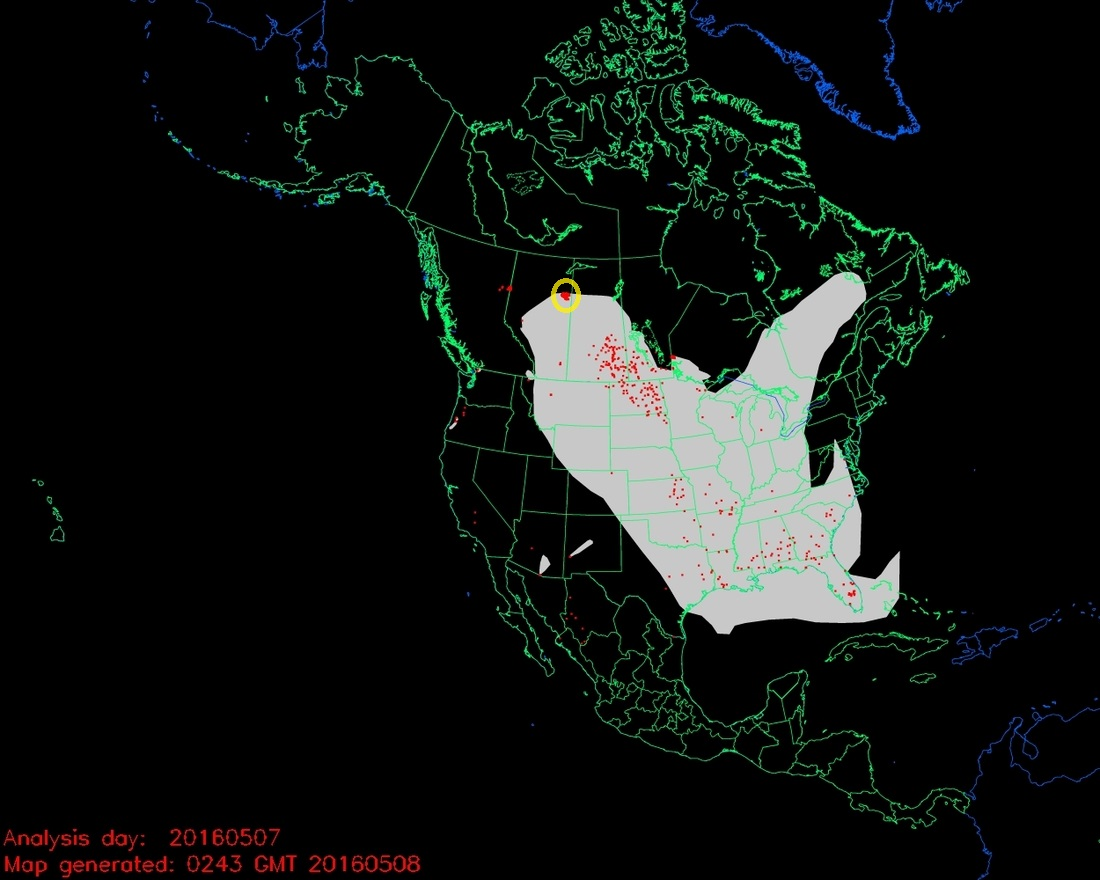
Satellite images of the fire at day (May 3, 2016) overnight (May 5, 2016), and its smoke impacts across North America.

The wildfire halted oil sands production at facilities north of Fort McMurray. Shell Canada shut down output at its Albian Sands mining operation, located approximately 70 km (43 mi) north of Fort McMurray. The company said its priority was to get employees and their families out of the region, and provide capacity at its work camp for some of the evacuees. Shell also provided its landing strip to fly employees and their families to Calgary or Edmonton and provided two teams to support firefighting efforts in the area.

Suncor Energy and Syncrude Canada also scaled back operations. Suncor's Millennium and North Steepbank mines were two of the largest and oldest oilsands mining operations in the Fort McMurray area, and Syncrude's Mildred Lake oilsands mine is located 35 km (22 mi) north of Fort McMurray. The companies accommodated another 2,000 evacuees each at their work camps. On May 7, Syncrude shut down all site and processing operations, removing 4,800 employees from the area. On May 16, all 665 rooms at Blacksands Executive Lodge, a work camp, burned in the wildfire. Earlier that day, about 8,000 people were ordered out of 19 camps; about 6,000 remained. By May 17, the fire appeared to reach the Noralta Lodge, a few kilometres east of Blacksands.

Approximately one million barrels of oil a day, equal to a quarter of Canada's oil production, was halted as a result of the fire in May 2016. This continued into June at a rate of 700,000 barrels per day. The lost output was estimated to cost the Albertan economy $70 million per day, and was a contributing factor to rises in global oil prices. The scaled back operations, along with a refinery outage in Edmonton, caused many gas stations to run out of gas throughout Western Canada. Oil companies restored production and anticipated all financial impacts would wear off by the end of the third fiscal quarter.

=== Costs ===
Initial insurance payouts were estimated to total as much as C$9 billion (US$6.92 billion) if the entire community had to be rebuilt. By July 7, 2016, the Insurance Bureau of Canada (IBC) and Catastrophe Indices and Quantification Inc. (CatIQ) reported that insured damage was estimated to have reached C$3.58 billion (US$2.75 billion), making the wildfire the most expensive disaster in Canadian history, surpassing the 1998 ice storms in Quebec ($1.9 billion) and the 2013 Alberta floods ($1.8 billion). The 2011 Slave Lake Wildfire, which destroyed one-third of the town of Slave Lake, cost approximately $750 million and was the most expensive fire-related disaster in Canadian history. The larger damage estimates were a result of Fort McMurray being 10 times the size of Slave Lake. A further estimate based on current damage estimated insurance payouts reaching as high as C$4.7 billion (US$3.61 billion).

=== Environmental Impact ===
The 2016 Fort McMurray wildfire had significant environmental consequences that extended beyond the immediate burn area. The fire burned through approximately 590,000 hectares (1.5 million acres) of land, an area comparable in size to Prince Edward Island.

Air quality was severely impacted during and after the wildfire. A study by the Wood Buffalo Environmental Association documented 188 exceedances of Alberta Ambient Air Quality Objectives for various pollutants during the fire event in May 2016. Two air monitoring sites within Fort McMurray recorded mean one-hour PM2.5 concentrations of 291 μg/m^{3} and 293 μg/m^{3}, with maximum readings reaching 5,229 μg/m^{3} and 3,259 μg/m^{3} respectively. These particulate matter concentrations were dangerously high, with potential serious health implications for residents and firefighters.

Research on the impact of the wildfire on atmospheric deposition of pollutants found elevated concentrations of certain polycyclic aromatic hydrocarbons (PAHs) and trace elements in the region after the fire. However, a study examining ombrotrophic bogs in the Athabasca Oil Sands Region concluded that while the wildfire contributed to some pollution, industrial activities remained the dominant source of most contaminants detected in the area.

=== Health Impacts ===
The Fort McMurray wildfire had substantial health impacts on residents, evacuees, and first responders. During the initial evacuation and in the years following, many individuals reported experiencing psychological distress and mental health challenges.

More than 25,000 people sought mental health support within three months of the wildfire, incurring an estimated cost of $4.8 million for mental health services. Research conducted three years after the evacuation found that evacuees continued to experience financial problems related to insurance claims, home reconstruction, job loss, and material assets loss. These ongoing stressors contributed to persistent mental health challenges for many affected residents.

Firefighters who battled the Fort McMurray wildfire suffered long-term health consequences. A study by the University of Alberta found that firefighters who worked during the wildfire experienced persistent lung damage even years after the event. The study monitored 1,234 Alberta firefighters over three years following the fire and found that many continued to suffer from respiratory issues due to smoke exposure and inadequate protection during the extended firefighting efforts.

In 2017, the Government of Canada, in partnership with the Government of Alberta and the Canadian Red Cross, allocated $3.4 million to fund seven research projects focused on the health impacts of the wildfire, particularly regarding mental health support and the toxic effects of wildfire cleanup.

== Re-entry and recovery ==
On May 18, the Alberta government provisionally announced a phased re-entry of residents into Fort McMurray between June 1 and 15, 2016, given that a set of key conditions were met:

- The wildfire no longer poses a threat and that hazardous areas can be secured;
- Local government can be re-established; and,
- Essential services such as emergency services, transportation, utilities and essential businesses can be re-established, as well as the infrastructure that supports these services.

Residents were allowed to re-enter Fort McMurray and surrounding communities according to a schedule broken down into residential zones.

The neighbourhoods of Waterways, Abasand, and Beacon Hill were severely burned, and were declared unsafe for reoccupation due to contamination from arsenic and heavy metals from leftover ash. 2,000 residents in these neighbourhoods were only allowed supervised visits to their homes, and relied on workers from the not-for-profit organization Team Rubicon to sift through leftover items. Between August 31 and October 24, 2016, residents of 470 homes within the three neighbourhoods were able to move home.

In the wake of the wildfire impact on Fort McMurray, the Regional Municipality of Wood Buffalo created a wildfire recovery plan, establishing a framework and governance structure for recovery efforts. Recovery funding was estimated to be above $4.5 billion: $615 million from federal, provincial and municipal governments; $319 million from the Canadian Red Cross; and $3.58 billion from the insurance industry. As of January 2018, 90% of wildfire claims have been processed according to the Insurance Bureau of Canada.

Reconstruction of impacted communities is ongoing, and as of May 2018, 20% of the homes destroyed have been rebuilt. The Regional Municipality of Wood Buffalo updated their Wildfire Mitigation Strategy in January 2018, which conducted a risk assessment for wildfire behaviour. It also proposed clearing 867 hectares of vegetation, various access and safety standards for planned infrastructure and land development, educating members of the public on wildfire threats, cooperation and joint training between the municipal and provincial departments, and updates to emergency plans. The Regional Municipality of Wood Buffalo also raised awareness about rebuilding homes to ensure they are more resilient to fire. However, insurance companies only provide funds to restore pre-fire conditions, and an independent review by KPMG found that it was unlikely that this would occur.

== See also ==
- Fire weather
- List of disasters in Canada
- List of fires in Canada
- Boreal forest of Canada
