= Danjou =

Danjou is a surname. Notable people with the surname include:

- Félix Danjou (1812–1866), French organist, composer-arranger and organist
- Frédéric Danjou (born 1974), French footballer
- Georges Danjou (1862–1926), French physician, physiotherapist, military doctor, writer, and activist
- Isabelle Danjou (born 1969), French rower
- Jean Danjou (1828–1863), French military personnel of the Crimean War

== See also ==
- Quartier Captaine Danjou, is a barracks in Castelnaudary in France
- D'Anjou, a short-necked cultivar of European pear
