= Insurance Bureau of Canada =

Canadian trade association

- Bureau d’assurance du Canada
- Formation: 1964; 62 years ago
- Purpose: Trade association
- Headquarters: Toronto, Ontario
- President & CEO: Celyeste Power
- Website: ibc.ca

The Insurance Bureau of Canada (IBC; French: Bureau d'assurance du Canada) is a trade association representing home, auto, and business insurance companies in Canada. Established in 1964, it promotes and lobbies for the insurance industry to governments and the general public.

IBC member companies represent 90% of the Canadian property and casualty (P&C) insurance market. Its member companies represent the vast majority of the Canadian property and casualty (P&C) insurance market.
