= Grégoire Michonze =

French painter

Grégoire Michonze, oil on canvas

Grégoire Michonze (Russian: Григо́рий Мишо́нзник; 1902–1982) (variant name Grégoire Michonznic, Grogórij Mišónznik) was a Russian-French painter, born in 1902 in Kishinev (Bessarabia), Russian Empire (now Republic of Moldova).

From 1919–1922, Michonze studied at a local art academy where, painting Russian icons, he learned to master the technique of painting with egg tempera. He continued his studies at the Academy of Painting in Bucharest and befriended the artist Victor Brauner. In 1922, after Bessarabia had become part of Romania, Michonze moved to Paris and met Max Ernst who later introduced him to the Surrealists, notably André Breton, Paul Éluard, Yves Tanguy and André Masson. He furthered his art studies by taking classes at the École des Beaux-Arts. During this period, Michonze met and developed a strong friendship with the Jewish École de Paris artist Chaïm Soutine. Between the period 1934–1936, Michonze exhibited at the Salon des Surindépendants. He described his work at these exhibitions as "Surreal naturalism". Michonze fought in the war and, after 1943, settled into a studio on Paris's Rue de Seine. He took up French citizenship in 1947, and in 1949, the French Fund for Modern Art acquired his now seminal canvas La moisson (The Harvest).

From 1954–1977, Michonze continued and perfected his life's work. He had extended stays in the United States where he spent time with his close friend, the American author Henry Miller. Michonze also travelled frequently to Israel where he exhibited, visited with his mother, and re-acquainted himself with his Jewish roots. He died of a heart attack in his studio at rue de Seine in Paris on December 29, 1982.

Michonze is primarily known as a landscape and figurative artist. A marked majority of his paintings include depictions of groups of people—families, villagers, peasants, children—and most works evince an allegory or narrative of some kind. Each work is imbued with mystery, a sort of hidden dialogue that enhances the appeal of the work and piques the viewer's curiosity. In a 1959 letter to the British art critic Peter Stone, Michonze wrote of his work: "My subjects have no subject. They exist only for a poetic end. If the poetry is there, the canvas is complete. No histories. Only pure poetry, preferably untitled."

== Selected exhibitions ==
- 1997: Galerie Francis Barlier, Paris
- 1985: Musée d'art moderne, Troyes (major retrospective)
- 1974: Givon Gallery, Tel-Aviv
- 1947: Mayor Gallery, London
- 1946: Arcade Gallery, London
- 1934: Salon des Surindépendants, Paris

== Selected collections ==
- Musée d'art moderne, Troyes
