= Félix Danjou =

French musician (1812–1866)

Jean-Louis-Félix Danjou (21 June 1812 – 4 March 1866) was a French organist, composer-arranger, and organist. He is best remembered for having discovered the Antiphonary of St. Benigne in 1847. and as founder of the Revue de la musique religieuse.

== Career ==
Danjou was organist at Church of Notre-Dame-des-Blancs-Manteaux 1831–34, Saint-Eustache from 1834–1844, at Notre-Dame de Paris from 1840 to 1847. He was also a partner with André-Marie Daublaine and fr:Louis Callinet, of the fr:Callinet family, in the fr:Daublaine-Callinet organ company.
