= Isfahan rug =

Persian carpet made in the Iranian city of Isfahan

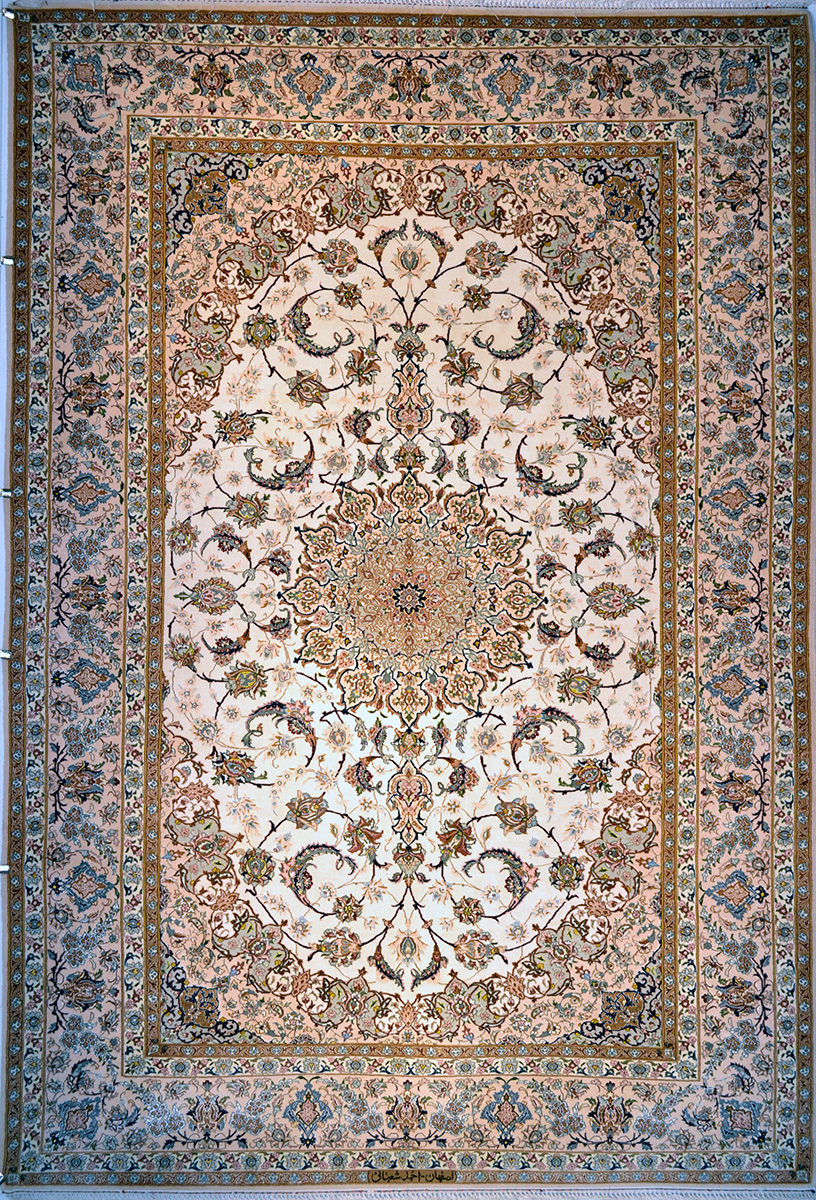
Isfahan carpet

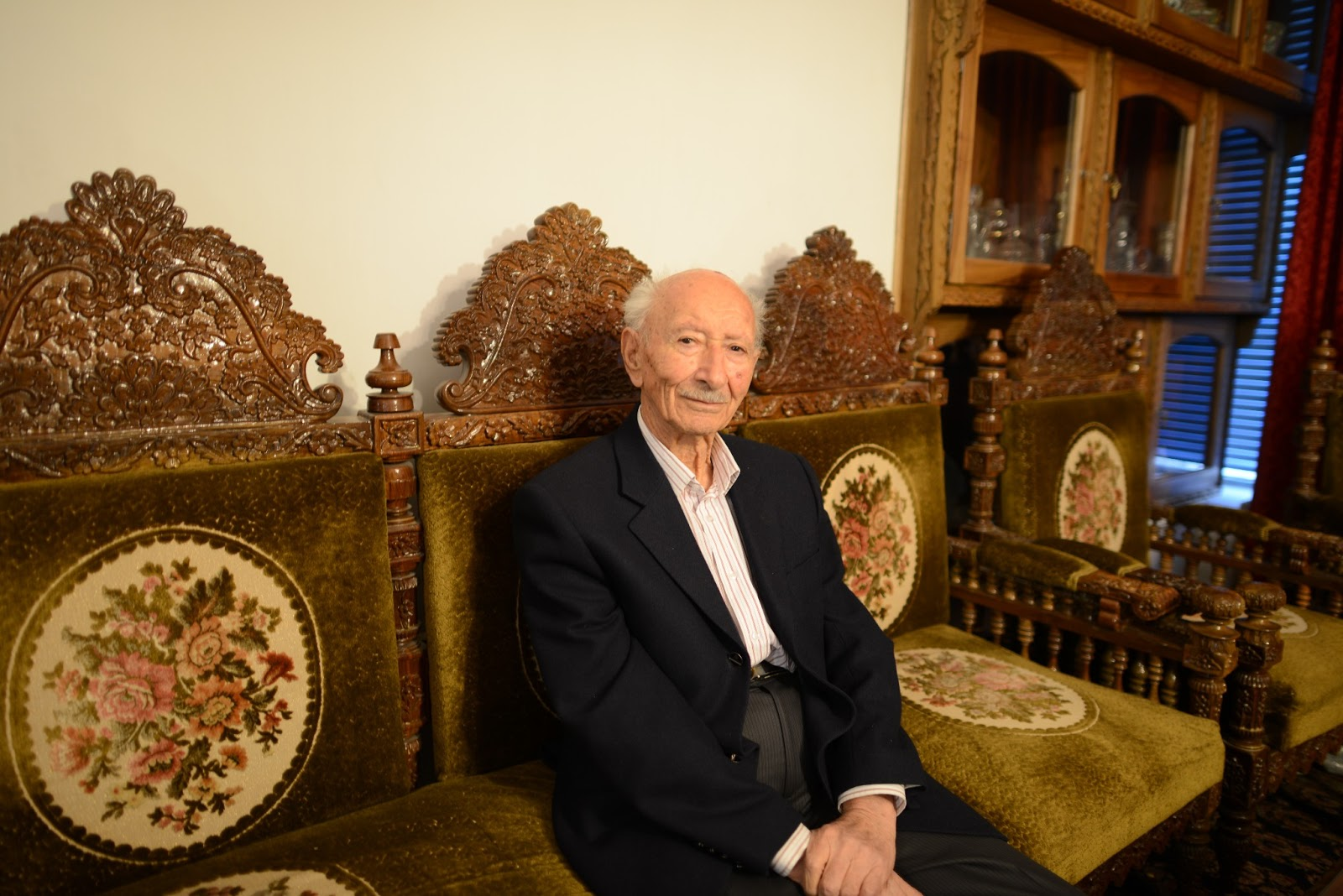
Master Mohammad Seirafian, Isfahan, Iran (2013)

The Iranian city of Isfahan has long been one of the centres for production of the famous Persian carpet (or rug). Isfahani carpets are renowned for their high quality. The most famous workshop in Isfahan is Seirafian. In Europe, they became incorrectly known as Polish rugs (a la polonaise) because of the trade route from Persia to France running through Poland.

== Isfahan ==
Isfahan rugs are knotted on either silk or cotton foundations, with up to 1.000.000 Persian knots/sqm(there have been pieces created by Seirafian master workshop with higher knot count), using exceptionally good quality (referred to as kork wool in Iran) wool for the pile, which is normally clipped quite low. In the beginning of the renewal of Isfahan as the carpet center of high quality rugs, most rugs used traditional motifs inspired by the architectural motifs and tiles that decorated the historical buildings of this great city. Designers were further inspired by the poets of Persia (Rumi, Hafez, Attar), nature, and religious spiritual intimations that are deeply ingrained in the culture. In contemporary items the palette has become more pastel, utilizing the technical perfection and artistic flair of this "City of Art". Both Classical and contemporary Isfahan’s are extremely attractive, and the subduing of the palette, particularly the elimination of strong reds, makes them more compatible with Western decorative schemes.

A range of traditional designs are still used including allover Shah Abbas, Vase, Tree of Life, and Pictorial schemes but by far the most popular composition is based on a circular central medallion (Derived from the famous mosque of Shah Lutf Allah in Isfahan) set against an elegantly sculpted field decorated with intricately purling vine palmette and flor motifs.

Antique/ semi-Antique rugs of Isfahan are more colorful and richer in tone than that of Nain, a nearby city renowned for its exceptional handmade rugs. Antique Isfahans are quite sought after since production had been almost completely been halted since 1722, during which the Afghan invasion occurred. It was not until the beginning of the 20th century that it was firmly reestablished.

Shah Abbas the Great was an inspired King of the Safavid dynasty, and in consequence not only moved the capital of Persia to Isfahan from Qazvin but also started an artistic renaissance within the capital of his court. Under his vision and guidance carpet weaving in Isfahan flourished. However the Afghan invasion dealt a serious blow to this industry which it never recovered from until the beginning of the 20th century. Some early pieces created in the last century can be found which consist of 500.000 knots-1.000.000 knots/m2, however these are rare and few in number. World war I brought a change in “modern” Isfahan which was the center of weaving for the fashion industry of Iran. The change of fashion in the world also influenced Iran, causing Isfahan to lose its lucrative fabric industry. However, the shrewd businessman of Isfahan decided to utilize the fine quality wool in fabrics and aba’s (woollen cloaks) into high quality Persian rugs which again reestablished Isfahan as a base for one of the finest and most beautiful carpets of Iran.

Some Isfahani rugs became known in Western Europe as "Polish rugs" or "Polonaise rugs". This name refers to carpets woven with silk, golden, and silver threads in Persia during the 16th-18th centuries and exported to the Polish–Lithuanian Commonwealth. They were commissioned by wealthy Polish noblemen and decorated with their coats of arms. Some of them were later resold to West European buyers who were often convinced of their Polish origin, hence their name.
