= Gregoire Lake Estates =

- Hamlet
- Location of Gregoire Lake Estates Gregoire Lake Estates (Canada)
- Coordinates: 56°26′40″N 111°10′48″W
- Country: Canada
- Province: Alberta
- Region: Northern Alberta
- Census division: 16
- Municipal district: Regional Municipality of Wood Buffalo

Government
  - Type: Unincorporated
  - Governing body: Regional Municipality of Wood Buffalo Council

Area (2021)
  - Land: 0.41 km^{2} (0.16 sq mi)

Population (2021)
  - Total: 138
  - Density: 340.7/km^{2} (882/sq mi)
- Time zone: UTC−06:00 (Alberta Time)
- Area codes: 780, 587, 825

Gregoire Lake Estates is a hamlet in northern Alberta, Canada within the Regional Municipality (RM) of Wood Buffalo. It is located on Highway 881, approximately 30 kilometres (19 mi) southeast of Fort McMurray.

== History ==
On May 4, 2016, the hamlet was ordered to be evacuated due to the rapid spread of the 2016 Fort McMurray wildfire.

== Demographics ==
In the 2021 Census of Population conducted by Statistics Canada, Gregoire Lake Estates had a population of 138 living in 52 of its 67 total private dwellings, a change of −16.4% from its 2016 population of 165. With a land area of 0.41 km^{2} (0.16 sq mi), it had a population density of 336.6/km^{2} (871.8/sq mi) in 2021.

The population of Gregoire Lake Estates according to the 2018 municipal census conducted by the Regional Municipality of Wood Buffalo is 204, a decrease from its 2012 municipal census population count of 275.

As a designated place in the 2016 Census of Population conducted by Statistics Canada, Gregoire Lake Estates had a population of 165 living in 62 of its 81 total private dwellings, a change of −12.2% from its 2011 population of 188. With a land area of 0.48 km^{2} (0.19 sq mi), it had a population density of 343.8/km^{2} (890.3/sq mi) in 2016.

== See also ==
- List of communities in Alberta
- List of designated places in Alberta
- List of hamlets in Alberta
