= Northeast Gainesville Residential District =

Historic district in Florida, United States

- U.S. National Register of Historic Places
- U.S. Historic district
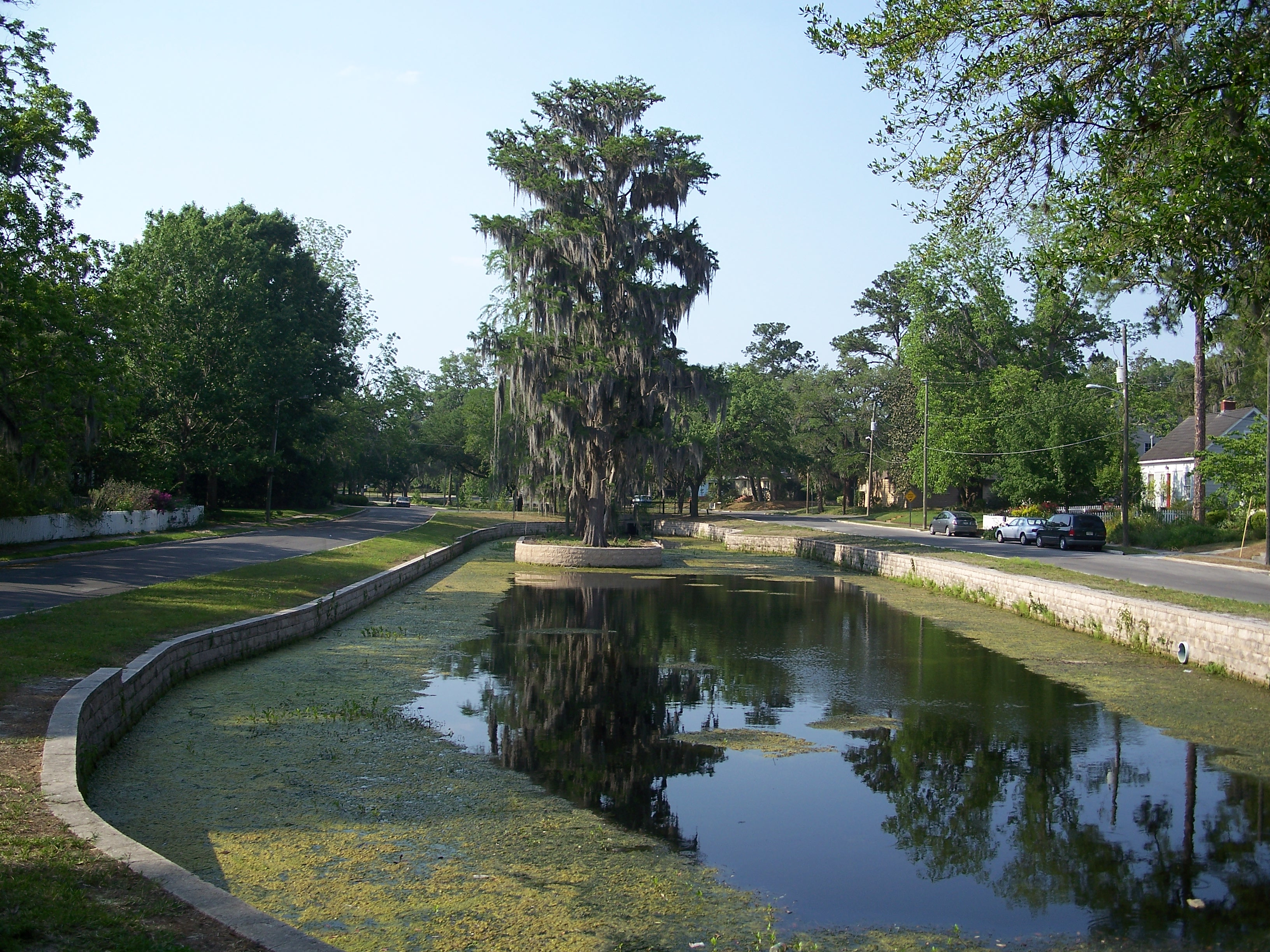
- Duckpond, in the district

- Location within Florida Location within the United States
- Location: Gainesville, Florida
- Coordinates: 29°39′23″N 82°19′11″W
- Area: 1,660 acres (6.7 km^{2})
- Built: 1875
- NRHP reference No.: 80000942
- Added to NRHP: February 12, 1980

The Northeast Gainesville Residential District, also known locally as the Duckpond, is a U.S. historic district (designated as such on February 12, 1980) located in Gainesville, Florida. It encompasses approximately 1,660 acres (6.7 km^{2}), bounded by 1st, and 9th Streets, 10th and East University Avenues. It contains 229 historic buildings.

== History ==
The Duckpond neighborhood was developed in the late 19th century and early 20th century. Its housing was influenced by Victorian, Mediterranean, and Colonial architecture.

In April 2021, the city commission voted to demolish the Thelma A. Boltin Center, an 80-year-old community center that was in poor condition. The decision was made due to termite damage, hollow walls, and structural issues but was subsequently criticized for a lack of consultation with the community or the city's Historical Preservation Board.

== Culture ==
=== Notable residents ===
The neighborhood contains the childhood home of Tom Petty, who died in 2017. In 2018, the neighborhood's northern park was renamed to Tom Petty Park. Additionally, in 2019, after approval by the Florida Historical Marker Council, a state historical marker was placed in the neighborhood to honor Tom Petty.
