= Alice Payne =

Canadian geologist

- Born: 1940 (age 85–86); Edmonton, Alberta
- Education: University of Alberta

Alice Virginia Payne (Alice Payne) is a Canadian geologist. She became the first female president of the Canadian Society of Petroleum Geologists in 1992. The University of Calgary granted her an honorary doctorate, and she also was honored by the Order of Canada. She is an important Canadian female figure in paving the way for female geologists, a field previously male-dominant. Payne played a foundational role in the creation of the Alberta Science and Technology (ASTech) Leadership Foundation, and is an active member of multiple geologic organizations.

== Early life and education ==
Born in Edmonton, Alberta in 1940 as the eldest of three children, Payne is the daughter of a nurse, named Olive Amelia (Olga) Banks, a native of Forestburg Alberta, as well as Thomas Payne of England, who was a gold prospector. Payne spent much of her time in Yellowknife, Northwest Territories supervising work at her father's gold mine and prospecting minerals. Her fondness of her father's work is what led her to accompany him to Yellowknife over many summers to learn how to spot promising land to lay claims and mine for gold. Her mother preferred for Payne to pursue a traditional woman's occupation, resulting in Payne's enrollment at Havergal College, an all-girls school in Toronto, in 1955. It was here she completed grades 10 to (the formerly required) 13. Her mother was of the belief that a rugged industry, such as geology, was no such place for a woman, and as such hoped that she would rethink her career path. Payne was awarded the Old Girls Life Achievement Award by Havergal.

In 1961, Payne went on an annual class field trip to the mountains, which let her put her skills of rock outcrops and mapmaking into actual practice. This experience became one of the foundations of her future contribution. Even following her return from Havergal, she remained determined to prove herself worthy of being a geologist, and Payne earned her BSc in geology at the University of Alberta in 1962, being the only female in her graduating class.

As a university student, Payne was denied the ability to participate in geological fieldwork and struggled more so to operate underground. With field experience being an important aspect of geology and with Payne's desire to become a practicing geologist, this was a considerable obstacle. She was only able to continue her pursuit of her future career as time eventually brought more flexibility within the rules set for women in geology.\

== Career ==
After graduation, Payne joined the Geological Survey of Canada in 1962 where her work was limited to the lab, a typical situation as women-geologists worked only as lab technicians in the 1960s. Wanting to perform field work, Payne obtained an MSc in geology at the University of Alberta in 1965, but the higher degree did not promote her to field work as she had hoped.

Social norms towards female scientists were changing in the late 1960s, and Payne found work in short-term projects, and for the university. For example, she helped to discover gypsum and coal exploration. She also contributed to the bedrock mapping for Syncrude new tailings pond dam.

In 1979, Payne was hired as an exploration geologist for Gulf Canada Resources in Calgary, Alberta where she continued as Senior Geologist for 15 years. During her time at Gulf Canada Resources, she used her expertise in hardrock mining to introduce a new method for searching for oil and gas, and was eventually promoted to supervisor, a rarity in those times for a woman. It was also during this time that she published several natural resources related papers.

Payne was once working as the treasurer of Canadian Society of Petroleum Geologists (CSPG). Her hard work in this role was approved by other members, which helped her to become the president in 1992. She then acted as director of the Calgary Science Centre from 1995 to 1997. As president of CSPG, Payne worked to secure a federal grant to train and hire students. Payne valued helping students get jobs with the CSPG, as employing students was something she valued.

She also helped the promotion of the "Atlas" of Western Canada. Payne retired in 1995, and started her own company Arctic Enterprises Limited.

Payne played a foundational role in the creation of the Alberta Science and Technology (ASTech) Leadership Foundation, and Operation Minerva. Operation Minerva supports young women wanting to pursue careers in science, technology, engineering, and mathematics (STEM). It provides mentorship programs. Furthermore, Payne was a council member of the Association of Professional Engineers and Geoscientists of Alberta (APEGA). She also offered her services to the Board of Examiners.

Payne's figure can be seen in the buildings of (ASTech) Leadership Foundation and Operation Minerva. In 2000, she published Quin Kola: Tom Payne's Search for Gold about her father.

== Personal life ==
After completing her bachelor's degree, she married her first husband in 1964, of whom she had two children with. Following her new marriage, she completed her M.Sc. in 1965, and continued to fight the gendered stereotypes within the field of geology at that time. In 1966, her father, Tom, had died, leaving Payne to look after his company, Ryan Gold Mines Ltd., which her father often called Quin Kola Gold Mines Ltd., and would later be the reason why she named her book Quin Kola: Tom Payne’s Search for Gold (2000), which discusses her father's story as well as her own.

In 1975, Payne and her first husband divorced, leaving her a single mother of two, and needing to find a way to support the three of them. She fought to make ends meet, and later in 1979, was hired by the Gulf Corporation in Calgary, Alberta. During this time, she proved herself as an asset, in which her non-traditional approaches for finding natural resources proved successful in locating oil and gas where her colleagues specializing in Petroleum geology were unable to.

Later, in 1987, Payne met her second husband, Robert Allin Folinsbee, a graduate of MIT, and geophysicist for Petro Canada. Together they had three children; Ian, Katherine, and Stuart. Following their marriage, she would retire from the Gulf corporation in 1992, yet remains even to this day, an active member of multiple geologic organizations, owns her father's gold mine, and currently resides on a ranch West of Calgary.

== Awards ==
- Order of Canada (1997)
- YWCA of Calgary's Women of Distinction for Science, Technology and the Environment (1998)
- 1997–1998 Service Awards (CSPG)
- 2000 Honorary Doctor of Laws Degree, University of Calgary
