= Gregory County =

Gregory County may refer to:

- Gregory County, South Dakota, United States
- Gregory County, New South Wales, Australia
