= Justice Gregory =

Justice Gregory may refer to:

- George Gregory Jr. (1921–2003), associate justice and Chief Justice on the South Carolina Supreme Court
- Hardy Gregory Jr. (born 1936), associate justice of the Supreme Court of Georgia
- Herbert B. Gregory (1884–1951), associate justice of the Supreme Court of Appeals of Virginia
- Robert Gregory (Indiana judge) (1811–1885), associate justice of the Supreme Court of Indiana
