= Gaspard Grégoire =

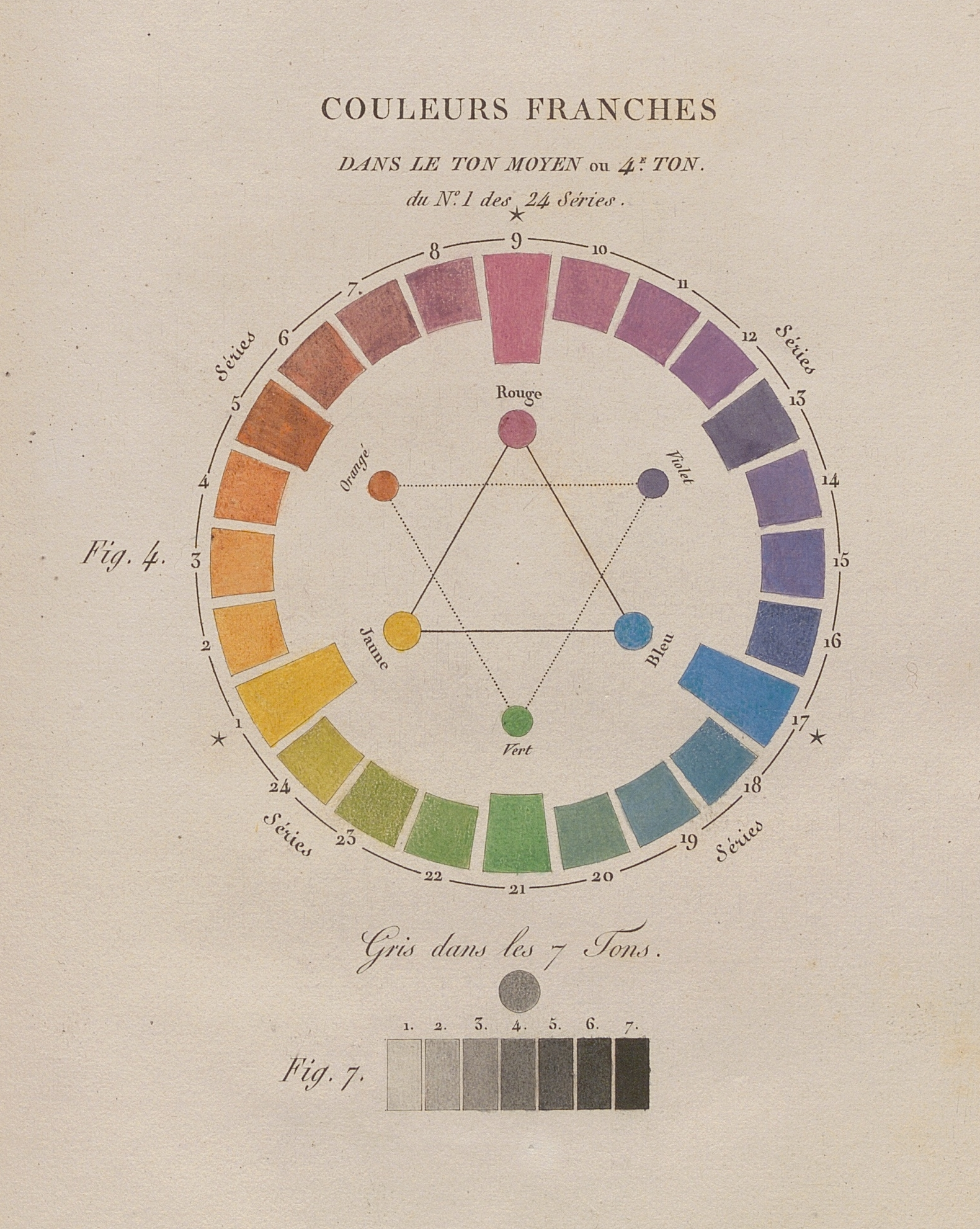
Color organization diagram from Grégoire (1839)

Gaspard Grégoire (20 October 1751 – 12 May 1846) was a French silk merchant who worked on an organization of colors based on hue, chroma and lightness. Born in a family of silk industrialists, he was involved in creating artworks in silk velour.

Grégoire was born in Aix en Provence, the son of another Gaspard Grégoire who came from a family that was involved in the silk production and trade in the city. Grégoire's father married into the Berage family and established the firm Berage Grégoire et Compagnie in 1761. Grégoire had seven siblings including one that became a musical secretary to Napoleon. In 1777, Grégoire joined his father's business. From around the same time he developed and patented a process for producing silk velour art. He also moved to Paris where he worked with the Manufactures Royales producing silk velour art works. It was during this period that he examined colors while dealing with the need to obtain silk of different colors and published a booklet on the colors of soap bubbles. He continued to work after the Revolution and worked at the Hotel Vaucanson which was owned by Jacques de Vaucanson. In 1813 he published La table des couleurs which introduced a chromatic circle and 1350 graduated colours. In 1820 he wrote a ''Theorie des couleurs'' expanding on his ideas on colors and introducing a color notation with numbers. He used yellow, red and blue as the primary colors and examined combinations of the three in various ratios. He also included different grey levels of these colors. His system had 24 hue grades, 5 achromatic grades, white, black and 8 chroma grades.
