= Saint-Grégoire =

Saint-Grégoire or variation, may refer:

== People ==
- Pope Gregory I, also known as Saint Gregory/Saint Grégoire
- Nicolas Saint Grégoire (born 1983), American-French artist

== Places ==
=== Canada ===
- Saint-Grégoire, Quebec, a community of the city of Bécancour, Quebec
- Mont Saint-Grégoire, mountain in the Montérégie region of southern Quebec
- Mont-Saint-Grégoire, Quebec, Canada; a municipality
- Saint-Grégoire-de-Greenlay, Quebec, Canada; a village municipality

=== France ===
A commune in France:

- Saint-Grégoire, Ille-et-Vilaine, in the Ille-et-Vilaine department
- Saint-Grégoire, Tarn, in the Tarn department
- Saint-Grégoire-d'Ardennes, in the Charente-Maritime department
- Saint-Grégoire-du-Vièvre, in the Eure department

== See also ==
- Knight of Saint-Grégoire
- Gregoire (disambiguation)
