= Gregor MacGregor (disambiguation) =

Gregor MacGregor (1786–1845) was a Scottish soldier, adventurer and confidence trickster who fought in the Venezuela and New Granada independence wars, and orchestrated the Poyais fraud of the 1820s and 1830s.

Gregor MacGregor may also refer to:

- Gregor MacGregor (sportsman) (1869–1919), Scottish rugby player and cricketer
- Sir Gregor MacGregor, 6th Baronet (1925–2003), British Army officer
- Gregor McGregor (1848–1914), Australian politician
- Gregor MacGregor (bishop) (1933–2003), bishop of Moray, Ross and Caithness, 1994–1998
