= Armenian Library and Museum of America =

Museum in Watertown, Massachusetts, U.S.

Armenian Museum of America
- Established: 1971 to 1985
- Location: 65 Main Street, Watertown, Massachusetts
- Coordinates: 42.36644°N 71.18582°W
- Type: Armenian
- Visitors: 3,000 (annually)
- Director: Jason Sohigian
- Curators: Gary Lind-Sinanian; Susan Lind-Sinanian (textile curator)
- Public transit access: MBTA
- Website: www.armenianmuseum.org

The Armenian Museum of America (AMA), located in Watertown, Massachusetts, United States, is an institution that has the largest collection of Armenian artifacts in North America.

== History ==
In 1971, alarmed by the growing loss and destruction of Armenian books and artifacts brought to this country by immigrants from Armenia, a group of talented Greater Boston Armenian-Americans banded together to form AMA to collect and preserve these books and artifacts. From humble beginnings in two rooms rented in 1972 in a church parish house in Belmont, AMA grew and expanded into a Watertown church's 4,000-square-foot (370 m^{2}) basement and opened to the public in 1985.

In 1988, AMA was able to buy and remodel the former Coolidge Bank and Trust Building at 65 Main Street in Watertown. The building is dedicated to the memory of Stephen P. Mugar and Marian G. Mugar, his wife. After being opened to the public as the Armenian Library and Museum of America in 1988, the name was officially changed to Armenian Museum of America in 2013.

== Building description ==
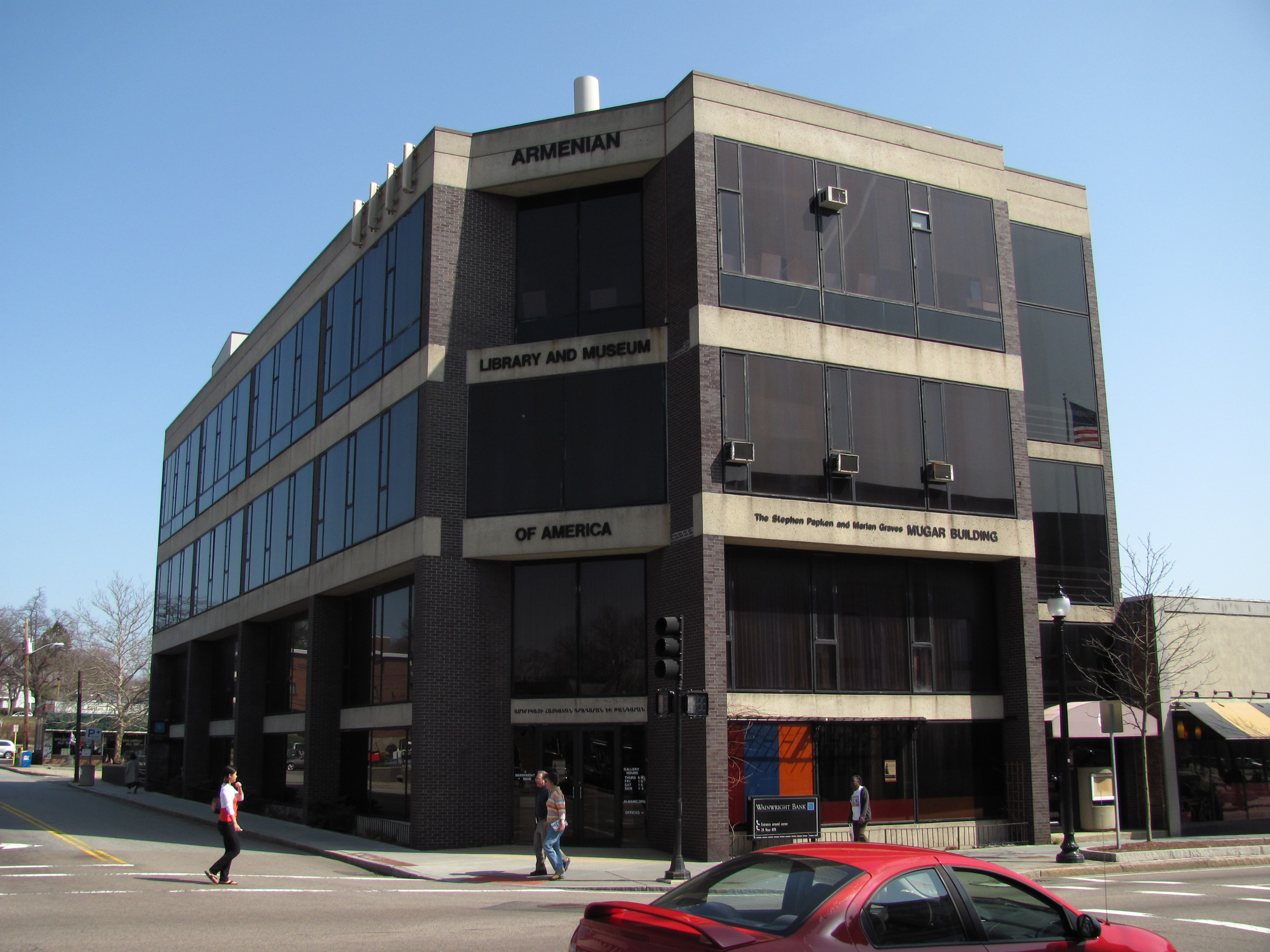
The museum's building

AMA's present home, in Watertown Square, is a four-story building plus basement containing approximately 30,000 square feet (2,800 m^{2}). AMA occupies all of the basement, the first and second floors, most of the third floor and has its library on the fourth floor. The building also houses the Armenian International Women's Association ("AIWA") and Project SAVE Armenian Photographic Archives.

== Museum facilities ==
Bedoukian Hall is AMA's main exhibit gallery. There are several smaller side galleries as well as the Contemporary Art Gallery and Terjenian-Thomas Art Gallery on the 3rd floor. Other facilities include the research library, studio space, offices, meeting rooms, classrooms, a 220-seat auditorium and a gift shop.

== Museum collections ==
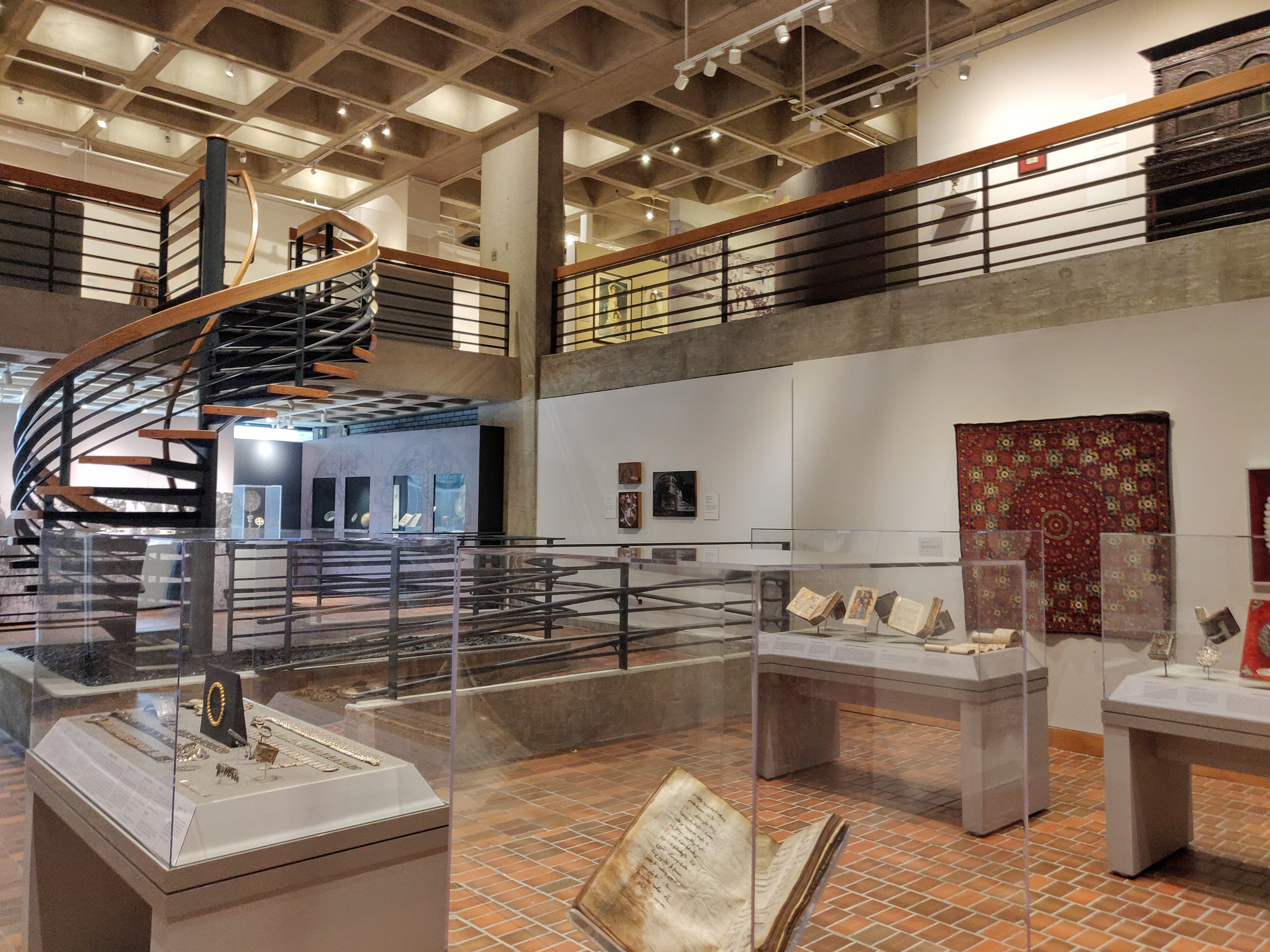
The museum's galleries

Armenian Museum of America holds one of the largest and most diverse holding of Armenian cultural artifacts outside of Armenia. The Museum maintains an active program of changing exhibits for the public, to provide new experiences for returning visitors and to showcase the wide range of materials in the collection. The museum averages 14 different exhibits annually.

As a repository for heirlooms, the collections now represent a major resource for Armenian studies and for preservation and illustration of Armenian heritage. AMA is the only independent Armenian museum in the diaspora, funded largely through contributions of individual supporters. An active board of trustees and volunteer base augment the museum’s staff.

The collections contain over 20,000 artifacts, including:

- Countless artifacts including prehistoric, Urartian, religious, ceramic, medieval illuminations and various other objects;
- Over 5,000 ancient and medieval Armenian coins;
- Over 3,000 textiles: AMA has one of the largest Armenian textile collections outside of Armenia. The trained textile curator, Susan Lind-Sinanian, has acted as a textile consultant to various institutions. The textiles are housed in climate-controlled space in the basement of the building. There they are also photographed, documented and cataloged.
- 930 rare books; and
- 170 Armenian rugs, many of which are inscribed in Armenian. The collection includes the Arthur T. Gregorian collection of Armenian inscribed rugs which he donated in 1992.

AMA houses and sometimes displays the collected painting of Dr. Jack Kevorkian, the assisted suicide crusader, whose parents were Armenian refugees.

== Library ==
AMA is home to the Mesrob Boyajian Library. The Library contains over 26,000 cataloged titles on a wide range of Armenian subjects. The earliest is the Garabed Gospel of AD 1207. The library has one of the largest collections of important books on oriental rugs, and a very substantial collection, which continues to be expanded, on the Armenian genocide. It also holds a significant number of periodicals.

The library is home to the Herbert Offen Oriental Carpet Research Library Collection, one of the most extensive collections of literature on oriental carpets in the United States. The Offen Family made a donation of the 2,500 volumes of the Herbert Offen Collection, and funds the further acquisition of literature related to rugs and carpets, whether new or antiquarian. The existing 2,500 volumes cover subject matters well beyond the narrow focus on the types and development of Oriental rugs, and encompasses broader issues including the social implications of rug collecting, symbolism and theory, care and aesthetics, the commercial marketing and business of rugs, economic and domestic structures in carpet production, historical and contemporary use of rugs, and other textile traditions closely related to rugs.

== Oral history collection ==
In the early 1970s, AMA embarked on an extensive program of interviewing survivors of the Armenian genocide, all or most of whom are now deceased. These tapes are digitized and de-noised. AMA's collection consists of over 1,400 hours of recorded oral histories and is a fertile source for research by scholars.
