= Gregoire Lake Provincial Park =

Provincial park in Alberta, Canada

- View of Gregoire Lake

- Location within Alberta
- Interactive map of Gregoire Lake Provincial Park
- Location: Wood Buffalo, Alberta, Canada
- Nearest city: Fort McMurray
- Coordinates: 56°29′06″N 111°10′58″W
- Area: 1,720.28 acres (6.9617 km^{2})
- Established: October 21, 1969
- Governing body: Alberta Tourism, Parks and Recreation

Gregoire Lake Provincial Park is a provincial park in Alberta, Canada. It is located close to Highway 63, between Fort McMurray and Lac La Biche, on the northern shore of Gregoire Lake.

The park is situated at an elevation of 490 m (1,610 ft) and has a surface of 27.2 km^{2} (10.5 sq mi). It was established on October 21, 1969, and is maintained by Alberta Tourism, Parks and Recreation.

== Amenities ==
The park has one overnight camping ground on the shore of Gregoire Lake and an additional day use area.

== Activities ==
The following activities are available in the park:

- Beach activities
- Birdwatching
- Camping
- Canoeing/kayaking
- Cross-country skiing (10 km non-groomed trails)
- Fishing
- Group camping
- Front Country Hiking
- Horseshoes
- Ice fishing
- Power boating
- Sailing
- Snowmobiling (on to lake only and on designated snowmobile trails outside the park)
- Swimming
- Water-skiing
- Windsurfing

== See also ==
- List of provincial parks in Alberta
- List of Canadian provincial parks
- List of Canadian national parks
