= Gregoire River =

Stream in Alberta, Canada

Coordinates: 56.48352°N 110.80178°W

Gregoire River is a tributary of the Athabasca River in Alberta, Canada. It is the only outflow of Willow Lake.

The river is a migration route for the northern pike, longnose sucker, and white sucker.

Gregoire River has the name of a pioneer citizen.

== See also ==
- List of rivers of Alberta
