= Isis Balancing Storage =

Small dam near Bundaberg, Queensland, Australia

- Location of the dam in Queensland
- Interactive map of Isis Balancing Storage
- Country: Australia
- Location: 24 km (15 mi) north of Childers, Wide Bay-Burnett, Queensland
- Coordinates: 25°01′57″S 152°14′06″E
- Purpose: Irrigation
- Status: Operational
- Opening date: 1986
- Operator: SunWater

Dam and spillways
- Type of dam: Earth fill dam
- Impounds: Tributary of the Elliott River
- Height (foundation): 14.2 m (47 ft)
- Length: 721 m (2,365 ft)
- Elevation at crest: 64.2 m (211 ft) AHD
- Width (crest): 6 m (20 ft)
- Spillway type: Uncontrolled
- Spillway capacity: 453 m^{3}/s (16,000 cu ft/s)

Reservoir
- Creates: Lake Gregory
- Total capacity: 6,440 ML (5,220 acre⋅ft)
- Active capacity: 6,160 ML (4,990 acre⋅ft)
- Catchment area: 12.8 km^{2} (4.9 sq mi)
- Surface area: 167 ha (410 acres)
- Maximum water depth: 3.1 m (10 ft)
- Normal elevation: 64 m (210 ft) AHD

The Isis Balancing Storage is a small earth-filled embankment dam across an unnamed tributary of the Elliott River, located between Bundaberg and Childers in the Wide Bay-Burnett region of Queensland, Australia. Completed in 1986, the impoundment created Lake Gregory, also known as The Duckpond, that was built to provide irrigation water to farmers on the Isis channel system.

== Overview ==
The dam wall is 14.2 metres (47 ft) high, 721 metres (2,365 ft) long, 6 metres (20 ft) wide at the crest, and holds back 6,440 megalitres (5,220 acre⋅ft) when at full capacity. The small reservoir is 1.67 square kilometres (0.64 sq mi) in area, with an average depth of 3.1 metres (10 ft) that draws from a catchment area of 12.8 square kilometres (4.9 sq mi).

In 1991, the reservoir was stocked with 80,000 bass and 25,000 Silver Perch. Garfish and eel-tailed catfish occur naturally. Lake Gregory is the closest freshwater storage lake to Bundaberg and is surrounded by the Elliott State Forest. A Stocked Impoundment Permit is required to fish in the dam.
