= Preservation breeding =

Preservation breeding is an attempt by many plant and animal breeders to preserve bloodlines of species, either of a rare breed, or of rare pedigrees within a breed.

== Purpose ==
Preservation breeding can have several purposes:

1. Protection of genetic diversity within a species or a breed;
2. Preservation of valuable genetic traits that may not be popular or in fashion in the present, but may be of great value in the future;
3. Population or re-population of an area where a species previously existed;
4. Support of a wild population that is defective or infected, by breeding healthy individuals and releasing them into the population in order to strengthen the overall health of the population.

== Mechanism ==
Preservation breeding can take the following forms:

1. Selective breeding of rare breeds and rare pedigrees, particularly monitoring breeding genetics in small populations to ensure diversity is maintained as much as possible;
2. Rare breeds that suffer life-threatening genetic deficiencies can be intentionally cross-bred with other breeds that have the critical gene, in order to preserve the rare breed into the future;

== History ==
The term preservation breeding was first used by notable American Kennel Club Judges Douglas Johnson and Bill Shelton in breeder seminars for dog breeders in the early 2000s. The preservation of dog breeds and the conservancy of canine genetics started gaining more traction in the mid-2010s.

== See also ==
- Breeding back
- Conservation genetics
