= Gregoire Lake =

Lake in Alberta, Canada

- A beach at Gregoire Lake Provincial Park

- Location within Alberta
- Location: Wood Buffalo, Alberta
- Coordinates: 56°27′06″N 111°07′38″W
- Type: eutrophic
- Primary outflows: Gregoire River
- Catchment area: 232 km^{2} (90 sq mi)
- Basin countries: Canada
- Max. length: 9.3 km (5.8 mi)
- Max. width: 4.6 km (2.9 mi)
- Surface area: 25.8 km^{2} (10.0 sq mi)
- Average depth: 3.9 m (13 ft)
- Max. depth: 7.2 m (24 ft)
- Surface elevation: 480 m (1,570 ft)

Gregoire (Willow) Lake is a lake in Alberta, Canada. It is part of the Athabasca River basin.

It is located in the wetlands of northern Alberta, adjacent to Highway 881, between Fort McMurray and Lac La Biche. It was known as "Willow Lake" until 1940 when the name was changed to "Gregoire Lake". It was renamed Willow Lake in 1992 at the request of local residents.

The lake has a total area of 25.8 km^{2} (10.0 sq mi) and lies at an elevation of 480 m (1,570 ft). It has a maximum depth of 7.2 m (24 ft) and an average depth of 3.9 m (13 ft).

The northern shore of the lake hosts Gregoire Lake Provincial Park, which is a traditional territory of Woodland Cree and Chipewyan First Nations.

== See also ==
- List of lakes in Alberta
