= Greg =

Greg is a masculine given name, and often a shortened form of the given name Gregory. Greg (sometimes spelled "Gregg") is also a surname.

== People with the name ==
- Greg Abbott (disambiguation), multiple people
- Greg Abel (born 1961/1962), Canadian businessman
- Greg Adams (disambiguation), multiple people
- Greg Allen (disambiguation), multiple people
- Greg Anderson (disambiguation), multiple people
- Greg Austin (disambiguation), multiple people
- Greg Ball (disambiguation), multiple people
- Greg Bell (disambiguation), multiple people
- Greg Bennett (disambiguation), multiple people
- Greg Berlanti (born 1972), American writer and producer
- Greg Biffle (1969–2025), American racing driver
- Greg Blankenship (born 1954), American football player
- Greg Boyd (disambiguation), multiple people
- Greg Boyer (disambiguation), multiple people
- Greg Brady (broadcaster) (born 1971), Canadian sports radio host
- Greg Brock (baseball) (born 1957), American baseball player
- Greg Brooker (disambiguation), multiple people
- Greg Brooks (disambiguation), multiple people
- Greg Brown (disambiguation), multiple people
- Greg Bryant (disambiguation), multiple people
- Greg Burke (disambiguation), multiple people
- Greg Burns (disambiguation), multiple people
- Greg Butcher (1952–2023), American politician
- Greg Calabrese, American actor
- Greg Camarillo (born 1982), American football player
- Greg Campbell (disambiguation), multiple people
- Greg Carey (disambiguation), multiple people
- Greg Alyn Carlson (1971–2019), American fugitive
- Greg Carr (disambiguation), multiple people
- Greg Carter (disambiguation), multiple people
- Greg Chambers (born 1982), British/Canadian ice hockey player
- Greg Cipes (born 1980), American actor
- Greg Clark (disambiguation), multiple people
- Greg Collins (disambiguation), multiple people
- Greg Cook (disambiguation), multiple people
- Greg Cox (disambiguation), multiple people
- Greg Craven (disambiguation), multiple people
- Greg Crippen (born 2002), American football player
- Greg Davies (born 1968), Welsh comedian and actor
- Greg Davis (disambiguation), multiple people
- Greg Dean (disambiguation), multiple people
- Greg Dobbs (born 1978), American baseball player
- Greg Dortch (born 1998), American football player
- Greg Downs (born 1958), English footballer
- Greg Downs (writer) (born 1971), American author and historian
- Greg Ducre, American football player
- Greg Dulli (born 1965), American musician, founding member of The Afghan Whigs, The Twilight Singers, and The Gutter Twins
- Greg Eagles (born 1970), African-American actor
- Greg Edwards (disambiguation), multiple people
- Greg Ellis (disambiguation), multiple people
- Greg Evans (disambiguation), multiple people
- Greg Fidelman (born 1977), American music engineer, producer and mixer
- Greg Foster (disambiguation), multiple people
- Greg Fox (disambiguation), multiple people
- Greg Gagne (disambiguation), multiple people
- Greg Gaines (disambiguation), multiple people
- Greg Garcia (disambiguation), multiple people
- Greg Gardner (born 1975), Canadian ice hockey player and coach
- Greg Garrett (disambiguation), multiple people
- Greg Garrison (1924–2005), American television producer and director
- Greg Gary (disambiguation), multiple people
- Greg Gershuny, Executive Director of the Aspen Institute's Energy and Environment Program
- Greg Gianforte (born 1961), American businessman and politician
- Greg Gibson (disambiguation), multiple people
- Greg Green (born 1963), American businessman
- Greg Guidry (1954–2003), American singer-songwriter
- Greg Gutfeld (born 1964), American commentator
- Greg Hall (disambiguation), multiple people
- Greg Ham (1953–2012), Australian musician, songwriter, member of the band Men at Work
- Greg Harris (disambiguation), multiple people
- Greg Hartle (born 1951), American football player
- Greg Hill (disambiguation), multiple people
- Greg Holland (disambiguation), multiple people
- Greg Holmes (disambiguation), multiple people
- Greg Howard (disambiguation), multiple people
- Greg Hunt (born 1965), Australian former Minister for Health
- Greg Hyman (1947–2026), American toy inventor
- Greg Jackson (disambiguation), multiple people
- Greg James (disambiguation), multiple people
- Greg Jeffries (born 1971), American football player
- Greg Johnson (disambiguation), multiple people
- Greg Johnston (disambiguation), multiple people
- Greg Jones (disambiguation), multiple people
- Greg Joseph (born 1994) American football player
- Greg Kane (disambiguation), multiple people
- Greg Kelly (born 1968), American TV news reporter
- Greg Kennedy (disambiguation), multiple people
- Greg Kindle (born 1950), American football player
- Greg King (disambiguation), multiple people
- Greg Lake (disambiguation), multiple people
- Greg Lamberson (born 1964), American author and filmmaker
- Greg Lambert (disambiguation), multiple people
- Greg Lee (disambiguation), multiple people
- Greg LeMond (born 1961), American road racing cyclist, three-time winner of the Tour de France
- Greg Lewis (disambiguation), multiple people
- Greg Little (disambiguation), multiple people
- Greg Lloyd (born 1965), American player in the National Football League
- Greg Lloyd Jr. (born 1989), American player in the National Football League, son of the above
- Greg Long (disambiguation), multiple people
- Greg Louganis (born 1960), American Olympic champion diver and LGBT activist
- Greg Lundgren (born 1969), American artist
- Greg Luzinski (born 1950), American baseball player
- Greg MacLeod (1935–2017), Canadian priest and educator
- Greg Maddux (born 1966), American baseball player
- Greg Malone (disambiguation), multiple people
- Greg Mancz (born 1992), American football player
- Greg Marderian (born 1952), American football player
- Greg Marshall (disambiguation), multiple people
- Greg Martin (disambiguation), multiple people
- Greg Miller (disambiguation), multiple people
- Greg Moore (disambiguation), multiple people
- Greg Morris (disambiguation), multiple people
- Greg Mullavey (born 1939), American theater, television, and film actor
- Greg Myers (disambiguation), multiple people
- Greg Nelson (disambiguation), multiple people
- Greg Newsome II (born 2000), American football player
- Greg Norman (born 1955), Australian golfer and entrepreneur
- Greg Norton (disambiguation), multiple people
- Greg Olsen (disambiguation), multiple people
- Greg Olson (disambiguation), multiple people
- Greg Orton (disambiguation), multiple people
- Greg Overstreet, American lawyer and politician
- Greg Page (disambiguation), multiple people
- Greg Parker, British physicist
- Greg Pearce (disambiguation), multiple people
- Greg Perry (disambiguation), multiple people
- Greg Peterson (disambiguation), multiple people
- Greg Potter, American comic book writer
- Greg Richards (disambiguation), multiple people
- Greg Roberts (disambiguation), multiple people
- Greg Robinson (disambiguation), multiple people
- Greg Rusedski (born 1973), Canadian-born British tennis player
- Greg Rutherford (born 1986), British long jumper
- Greg Scott (disambiguation), multiple people
- Greg Senat (born 1994), American football player
- Greg Shaw (disambiguation), multiple people
- Greg Smith (disambiguation), multiple people
- Greg St. Jean, American basketball coach and former player
- Greg Stekelman (born 1975), English novelist
- Greg Stevens (disambiguation), multiple people
- Greg Stewart (disambiguation), multiple people
- Greg Stroman (born 1996), American football player
- Greg Sutton (disambiguation), multiple people
- Greg Tansey (born 1988), English footballer
- Greg Taylor (disambiguation), multiple people
- Greg Thompson (disambiguation), multiple people
- Greg Tribbett (born 1968), American musician and songwriter
- Greg van Hest (born 1973), Dutch long-distance runner
- Greg VanWoerkom (born 1980), American politician
- Greg Valentine (born 1951), American professional wrestler
- Greg Vavra (born 1961), Canadian football player
- Greg Walker (disambiguation), multiple people
- Greg Ward Jr. (born 1995), American football player
- Greg Warren (disambiguation), multiple people
- Greg Weisman (born 1963), American writer, actor, producer
- Greg Wells (disambiguation), multiple people
- Greg Whittington (born 1993), American basketball player
- Greg Wilkins (disambiguation), multiple people
- Greg Williams (disambiguation), multiple people
- Greg Wilson (disambiguation), multiple people
- Greg Wood (disambiguation), multiple people
- Greg Young (disambiguation), multiple people
- Greg Zuerlein, multiple people

== People with the nickname ==
- Greg (cartoonist) (1931–1999), the pseudonym of Belgian comic book artist Michel Regnier
- Danny Gonzalez's collective fanbase

== Fictional characters with the name ==
- Greg Brady (Brady Bunch), on the American sitcom The Brady Bunch
- Greg Foster (The Young and the Restless), on the American soap opera The Young and the Restless
- Greg Heffley, protagonist of the children's book series Diary of a Wimpy Kid
- Greg Jessop, on the British soap opera EastEnders
- Greg Nelson, on the American soap opera All My Children

== Other uses ==
- Great egret, a species of bird whose Institute for Bird Populations code is GREG

== See also ==
- Gregg (disambiguation)
- Gregory (disambiguation)
- Gregoire (disambiguation)
- Gregores (disambiguation)
- Gregor (disambiguation)
- Greig (disambiguation)
