= 1962 in the United States =

- Decades: 1940s; 1950s; 1960s; 1970s; 1980s
- See also: History of the United States (1945–1964); Timeline of United States history (1950–1969); List of years in the United States

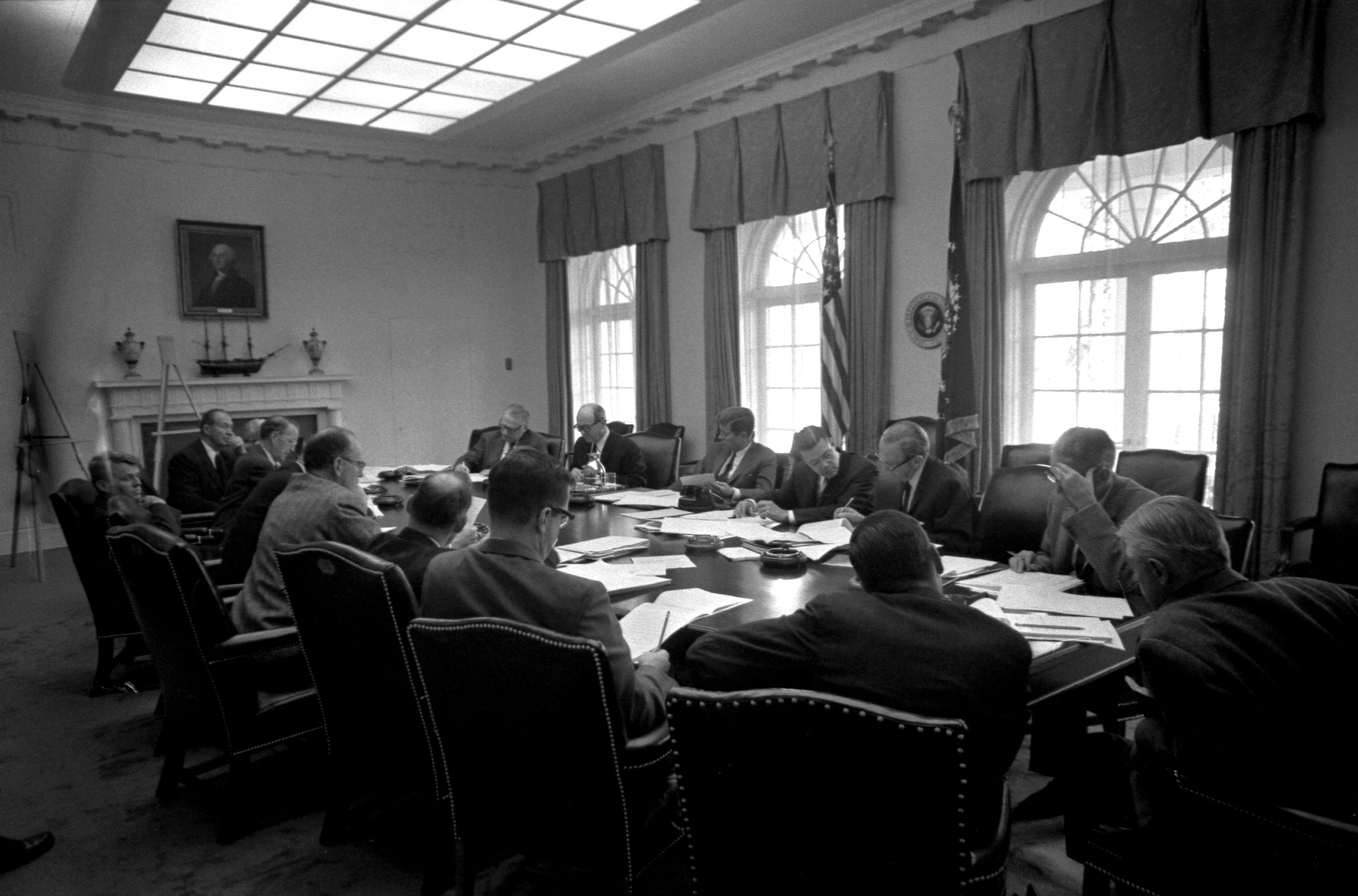
EXCOMM meeting in the White House Cabinet Room during the Cuban Missile Crisis on October 29, 1962.

Events from the year 1962 in the United States.

The year saw the Cuban Missile Crisis, which is often considered the closest the world came to a nuclear confrontation during the Cold War. The major American retailers Walmart, Kmart, and Target open their first stores.

== Incumbents ==
=== Federal government ===
- President: John F. Kennedy (D-Massachusetts)
- Vice President: Lyndon B. Johnson (D-Texas)
- Chief Justice: Earl Warren (California)
- Speaker of the House of Representatives:

vacant (until January 10)
John William McCormack (D-Massachusetts) (starting January 10)

- Senate Majority Leader: Mike Mansfield (D-Montana)
- Congress: 87th

==== State governments ====
Governors and lieutenant governors

=== Governors ===
- Governor of Alabama: John M. Patterson (Democratic)
- Governor of Alaska: William A. Egan (Democratic)
- Governor of Arizona: Paul Fannin (Republican)
- Governor of Arkansas: Orval Faubus (Democratic)
- Governor of California: Pat Brown (Democratic)
- Governor of Colorado: Stephen L. R. McNichols (Democratic)
- Governor of Connecticut: John N. Dempsey (Democratic)
- Governor of Delaware: Elbert N. Carvel (Democratic)
- Governor of Florida: C. Farris Bryant (Democratic)
- Governor of Georgia: Ernest Vandiver (Democratic)
- Governor of Hawaii: William F. Quinn (Republican) (until December 3), John A. Burns (Democratic) (starting December 3)
- Governor of Idaho: Robert E. Smylie (Republican)
- Governor of Illinois: Otto Kerner Jr. (Democratic)
- Governor of Indiana: Matthew E. Welsh (Democratic)
- Governor of Iowa: Norman A. Erbe (Republican)
- Governor of Kansas: John Anderson Jr. (Republican)
- Governor of Kentucky: Bert T. Combs (Democratic)
- Governor of Louisiana: Jimmie H. Davis (Democratic)
- Governor of Maine: John H. Reed (Republican)
- Governor of Maryland: J. Millard Tawes (Democratic)
- Governor of Massachusetts: John A. Volpe (Republican)
- Governor of Michigan: John Swainson (Democratic)
- Governor of Minnesota: Elmer L. Andersen (Republican)
- Governor of Mississippi: Ross R. Barnett (Democratic)
- Governor of Missouri: John M. Dalton (Democratic)
- Governor of Montana: Donald Grant Nutter (Republican) (until January 25), Tim M. Babcock (Republican) (starting January 25)
- Governor of Nebraska: Frank B. Morrison (Democratic)
- Governor of Nevada: Grant Sawyer (Democratic)
- Governor of New Hampshire: Wesley Powell (Republican)
- Governor of New Jersey: Robert B. Meyner (Democratic) (until January 16), Richard J. Hughes (Democratic) (starting January 16)
- Governor of New Mexico: Edwin L. Mechem (Republican) (until November 30), Tom Bolack (Republican) (starting November 30)
- Governor of New York: Nelson Rockefeller (Republican)
- Governor of North Carolina: Terry Sanford (Democratic)
- Governor of North Dakota: William L. Guy (Democratic)
- Governor of Ohio: Michael DiSalle (Democratic)
- Governor of Oklahoma: J. Howard Edmondson (Democratic)
- Governor of Oregon: Mark Hatfield (Republican)
- Governor of Pennsylvania: David L. Lawrence (Democratic)
- Governor of Rhode Island: John A. Notte Jr. (Democratic)
- Governor of South Carolina: Ernest Hollings (Democratic)
- Governor of South Dakota: Archie M. Gubbrud (Republican)
- Governor of Tennessee: Buford Ellington (Democratic)
- Governor of Texas: Price Daniel (Democratic)
- Governor of Utah: George Dewey Clyde (Republican)
- Governor of Vermont: F. Ray Keyser Jr. (Republican)
- Governor of Virginia: J. Lindsay Almond (Democratic) (until January 13), Albertis S. Harrison Jr. (Democratic) (starting January 13)
- Governor of Washington: Albert D. Rosellini (Democratic)
- Governor of West Virginia: William Wallace Barron (Democratic)
- Governor of Wisconsin: Gaylord A. Nelson (Democratic)
- Governor of Wyoming: Jack R. Gage (Democratic)

=== Lieutenant governors ===
- Lieutenant Governor of Alabama: Albert B. Boutwell (Democratic)
- Lieutenant Governor of Alaska: Hugh Wade (Democratic)
- Lieutenant Governor of Arkansas: Nathan Green Gordon (Democratic)
- Lieutenant Governor of California: Glenn Malcolm Anderson (Democratic)
- Lieutenant Governor of Colorado: Robert Lee Knous (Democratic)
- Lieutenant Governor of Connecticut: Anthony J. Armentano (Democratic)
- Lieutenant Governor of Delaware: Eugene Lammot (Democratic)
- Lieutenant Governor of Georgia: Garland T. Byrd (Democratic)
- Lieutenant Governor of Hawaii: James Kealoha (Republican) (until December 2), William S. Richardson (Democratic) (starting December 2)
- Lieutenant Governor of Idaho: William Drevlow (Democratic)
- Lieutenant Governor of Illinois: Samuel H. Shapiro (Democratic)
- Lieutenant Governor of Indiana: Richard O. Ristine (Republican)
- Lieutenant Governor of Iowa: W. L. Mooty (Democratic)
- Lieutenant Governor of Kansas: Harold H. Chase (Republican)
- Lieutenant Governor of Kentucky: Wilson W. Wyatt (Democratic)
- Lieutenant Governor of Louisiana: C. C. Aycock (Democratic)
- Lieutenant Governor of Massachusetts: Edward F. McLaughlin Jr. (Democratic)
- Lieutenant Governor of Michigan: T. John Lesinski (Democratic)
- Lieutenant Governor of Minnesota: Karl Rolvaag (Democratic)
- Lieutenant Governor of Mississippi: Paul B. Johnson Jr. (Democratic)
- Lieutenant Governor of Missouri: Hilary A. Bush (Democratic)
- Lieutenant Governor of Montana: Tim M. Babcock (Republican) (until January 25), David F. James (Democratic) (starting January 25)
- Lieutenant Governor of Nebraska: Dwight Burney (Republican)
- Lieutenant Governor of Nevada: Rex Bell (Republican) (until July 4), Maude Frazier (Democratic) (starting July 4)
- Lieutenant Governor of New Mexico: Tom Bolack (Republican) (until November 30), vacant (starting November 30)
- Lieutenant Governor of New York: Malcolm Wilson (Republican)
- Lieutenant Governor of North Carolina: vacant
- Lieutenant Governor of North Dakota: Orville W. Hagen (Republican)
- Lieutenant Governor of Ohio: George Nigh (Democratic)
- Lieutenant Governor of Oklahoma: Cowboy Pink Williams (Democratic)
- Lieutenant Governor of Pennsylvania: John Morgan Davis (Democratic)
- Lieutenant Governor of Rhode Island: Edward P. Gallogly (Democratic)
- Lieutenant Governor of South Carolina: Burnet R. Maybank Jr. (Democratic)
- Lieutenant Governor of South Dakota:
  - until month and day unknown: Joseph H. Bottum (Republican)
  - month and day unknown: vacant
  - starting month and day unknown: Nils Boe (Republican)
- Lieutenant Governor of Tennessee: William D. Baird (Democratic) (until month and day unknown), vacant (starting month and day unknown)
- Lieutenant Governor of Texas: vacant
- Lieutenant Governor of Vermont: Ralph A. Foote (Republican)
- Lieutenant Governor of Virginia: Allie Edward Stokes Stephens (Democratic) (until January 13), Mills E. Godwin Jr. (Democratic) (starting January 13)
- Lieutenant Governor of Washington: John Cherberg (Democratic)
- Lieutenant Governor of Wisconsin: Warren P. Knowles (Republican)

== Events ==
=== January ===
- January 1
  - The United States Navy SEALs are activated. SEAL Team One is commissioned in the Pacific Fleet and SEAL Team Two in the Atlantic Fleet.
  - NBC introduces the "Laramie peacock" before a midnight showing of the series Laramie.
- January 2 – NAACP Executive Secretary Roy Wilkins praises U.S. President John F. Kennedy's "personal role" in advancing civil rights.
- January 4 – New York City Subway introduces a subway train that operates without a crew on board.
- January 26 – Ranger 3 is launched to study the Moon. It is the third during the Ranger program. Ranger 3 later misses the Moon by 22,000 miles.
- January 30 – Two of the high-wire "Flying Wallendas" are killed when their famous 7-person pyramid collapses during a performance in Detroit, Michigan.

=== February ===
- February 3 – The United States embargo against Cuba is announced.
- February 4 – Danny Thomas founds St. Jude Children's Research Hospital.
- February 6 – Negotiations between U.S. Steel and the United States Department of Commerce begin (see also Trade Expansion Act 1962)
- February 7 – The Kennedy Government bans all U.S.-related imports from Cuba and exports to Cuba.
- February 10 – Captured US spy pilot Francis Gary Powers is exchanged for captured Soviet spy Rudolf Abel in Berlin.
- February 14 – First Lady Jacqueline Kennedy takes television viewers on a tour of the White House.
- February 20 – Project Mercury: while aboard Friendship 7, John Glenn becomes the first American to orbit Earth, three times in 4 hours, 55 minutes.

=== March ===
- March 1 – American Airlines Flight 1, an American Airlines Boeing 707, crashes on takeoff at New York International Airport, after its rudder separates from the tail, killing all 87 passengers and eight crew members aboard.
- March 2 – Wilt Chamberlain scores 100 points in a single NBA basketball game.
- March 5–9 – Ash Wednesday Storm of 1962: One of the ten worst storms in the United States in the 20th century occurs, killing 40 people, injuring over 1,000, and causing hundreds of millions of dollars in property damage in six states.
- March 21 – The Taco Bell fast food restaurant chain is founded by Glen Bell, in Downey, California.
- March 26 – Baker v. Carr: the U.S. Supreme Court rules that federal courts can order state legislatures to reapportion seats.

=== April ===
- April 6 – Leonard Bernstein causes controversy with his remarks before a concert featuring Glenn Gould with the New York Philharmonic.
- April 9 – The 34th Academy Awards ceremony, hosted by Bob Hope, is held at Santa Monica Civic Auditorium. Robert Wise and Jerome Robbins' West Side Story wins ten awards, including Best Motion Picture and a joint Best Director win for Wise and Robbins. The film is tied for the most nominations with Stanley Kramer's Judgment at Nuremberg; both receive 11.
- April 10 – In Los Angeles, California, the first MLB game is played at Dodger Stadium.
- April 14 – A Cuban military tribunal convicts 1,179 Bay of Pigs attackers.
- April 16 – 20-year-old Bob Dylan premieres his song "Blowin' in the Wind", at Gerde's Folk City in Greenwich Village (New York City).
- April 21 – The Century 21 Exposition World's Fair opens in Seattle, Washington, opening the Space Needle to the public for the first time.

=== May ===
- May – Larry Allen Abshier becomes the first of six (possibly seven) American defectors to North Korea.
- May 1 – Dayton Hudson Corporation opens the first of its Target discount stores in Roseville, Minnesota.
- May 19 – Gala for President Kennedy's 45th birthday (on May 29) at Madison Square Garden in New York City at which Marilyn Monroe sings "Happy Birthday, Mr. President" in one of her last public appearances.
- May 24 – Project Mercury: Scott Carpenter orbits the Earth 3 times in the Aurora 7 space capsule.
- May 25 – The Baltimore Steam Packet Company, the last overnight steamboat service in the U.S., goes out of business.
- May 27 – The Centralia mine fire is ignited in Pennsylvania.

=== June ===
- June 3 – Air France Flight 007, Boeing 707 Chateau de Sully on a charter flight carrying cultural and civic leaders of Atlanta, Georgia, overruns the runway at Orly Airport in Paris; 130 of 132 passengers are killed.
- June 6 – President John F. Kennedy gives the commencement address at the United States Military Academy at West Point, New York.
- June 11 – President John F. Kennedy gives the commencement address at Yale University.
- June 15 – Port Huron Statement completed.
- June 25 – United States Supreme Court rulings:
  - Engel v. Vitale: the court rules that mandatory prayers in public schools are unconstitutional.
  - MANual Enterprises v. Day: the court rules that photographs of nude men are not obscene, decriminalizing nude male pornographic magazines.
- June 28 – The United Lutheran Church in America, the Finnish Evangelical Lutheran Church of America, the American Evangelical Lutheran Church and the Augustana Evangelical Lutheran Church merge to form the Lutheran Church in America.

=== July ===
- July 2 – The first Wal-Mart store opens for business in Rogers, Arkansas.
- July 10 – AT&T's Telstar, the world's first commercial communications satellite, is launched into orbit and activated the next day.
- July 17
  - Nuclear testing: the "Small Boy" test shot Little Feller I becomes the last atmospheric test detonation at the Nevada Test Site.
  - Robert M. White flies the X-15 to an altitude of 314,750 feet (59 miles (95 km) to qualify him for USAF Astronaut Wings becoming the first "winged" astronaut and one of a few who have flown into space without a conventional spacecraft.
- July 22 – Mariner program: the Mariner 1 spacecraft flies erratically several minutes after launch and has to be destroyed.
- July 23 – Jackie Robinson becomes the first African-American to be inducted into the Baseball Museum And Hall Of Fame.

=== August ===
- August 5 – Marilyn Monroe is found dead at age 36 from "acute barbiturate poisoning".
- August 15 – The New York Agreement is signed trading the West New Guinea colony to Indonesia.
- August 27 – NASA launches the Mariner 2 space probe.

=== September ===
- September 12
  - President John F. Kennedy, at a speech at Rice University featuring the words "We choose to go to the Moon", reaffirms that the U.S. will put a man on the Moon by the end of the decade.
  - The first Kohl's department store opens in Brookfield, Wisconsin.
- September 22 – Bob Dylan premieres his song "A Hard Rain's a-Gonna Fall" at Carnegie Hall in New York City.
- September 23 – Animated sitcom The Jetsons premieres on ABC.
- September 25 – Sonny Liston knocks out Floyd Patterson two minutes into the first round of his fight for the boxing world title at Comiskey Park in Chicago.
- September 29 – The Canadian Alouette 1, the first satellite built outside the United States and the Soviet Union, is launched from Vandenberg Air Force Base in California.
- September 30 – CBS broadcasts the final episodes of Suspense and Yours Truly, Johnny Dollar, marking the end of the Golden Age of Radio.

=== October ===
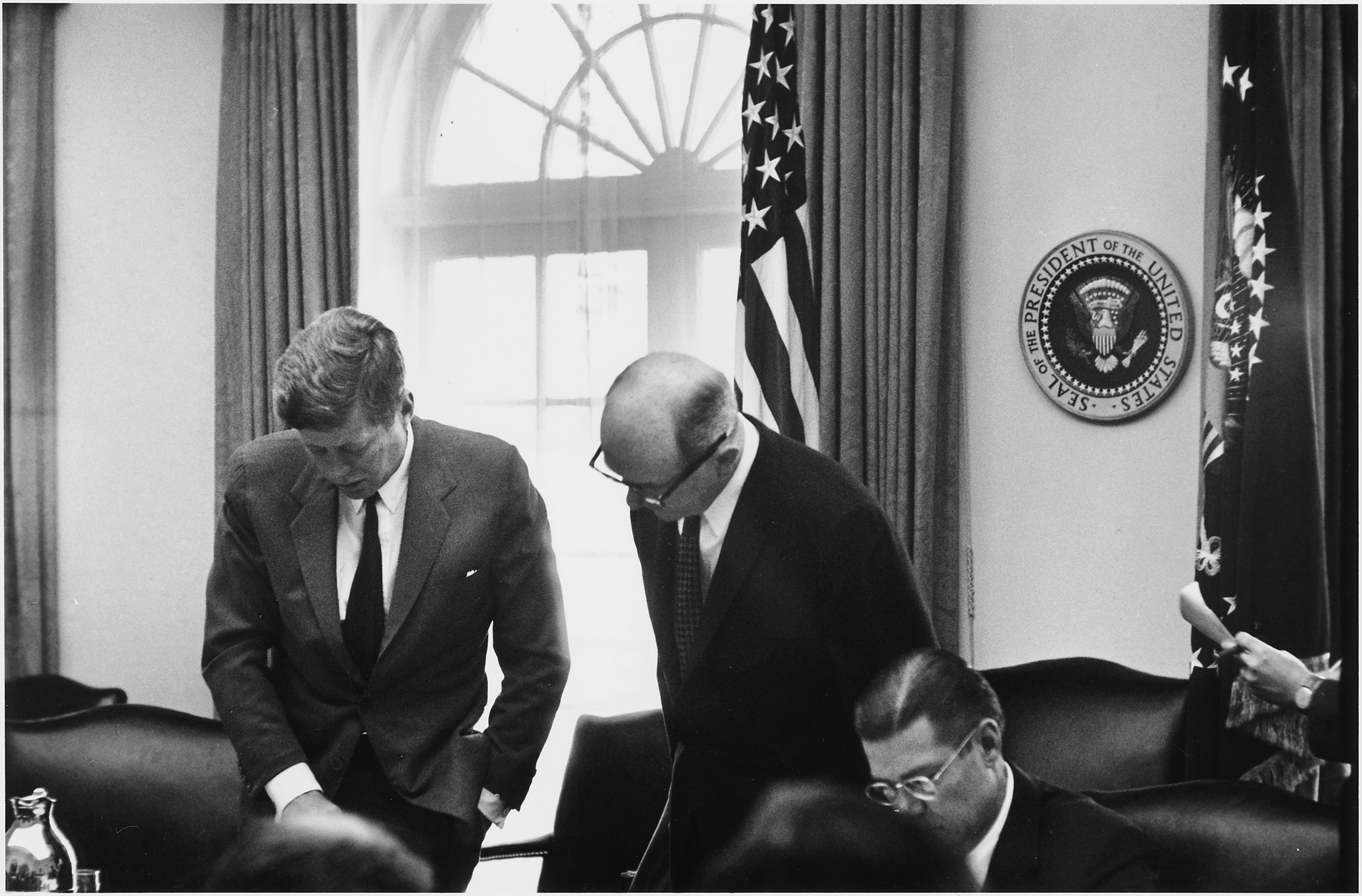
October 14–28: Cuban Missile Crisis

- October 1
  - The first black student, James Meredith, registers at the university of Mississippi, escorted by Federal Marshals.
  - Johnny Carson takes over as permanent host of NBC's The Tonight Show, a post he will hold for 30 years.
  - Lucille Ball and Vivian Vance return to TV with The Lucy Show, two years after the end of I Love Lucy (Vance is the first person to portray a divorcée on a weekly series).
- October 12
  - Groove Phi Groove Social Fellowship Incorporated is founded at Morgan State College.
  - The infamous Columbus Day Storm strikes the U.S. Pacific Northwest with wind gusts up to 170 mph (270 km/h); 46 are killed, 11 billion board feet (26×10^{6} m^{3}) of timber is blown down, with $230 million U.S. in damages.
  - Jazz bassist/composer Charles Mingus presents a disastrous concert at Town Hall in New York City. It will gain a reputation as the worst moment of his career.
- October 13 – Who's Afraid of Virginia Woolf? opens on Broadway.
- October 14 – Cuban Missile Crisis begins: a U-2 flight over Cuba takes photos of Soviet nuclear weapons being installed. A stand-off then ensues the next day between the United States and the Soviet Union, threatening the world with nuclear war.
- October 16 – The New York Yankees defeat the San Francisco Giants 1–0 in Game 7 of the 1962 World Series.
- October 22 – In a televised address, U.S. President John F. Kennedy announces to the nation the existence of Soviet missiles in Cuba.
- October 27 – The British revue play Beyond the Fringe makes its Broadway debut.
- October 28 – Cuban Missile Crisis: Soviet Union leader Nikita Khrushchev announces that he has ordered the removal of Soviet missile bases in Cuba. In a secret deal between Kennedy and Khrushchev, Kennedy agrees to the withdrawal of U.S. missiles from Turkey. The fact that this deal is not made public makes it look like the Soviets have backed down.

=== November ===
- November 7 – Richard M. Nixon loses the California governor's race. In his concession speech, he states that this is his "last press conference" and that "you won't have Dick Nixon to kick around any more".
- November 17 – In Washington, D.C., U.S. President John F. Kennedy dedicates Dulles International Airport.
- November 20 – The Cuban Missile Crisis ends: in response to the Soviet Union agreeing to remove its missiles from Cuba, U.S. President John F. Kennedy ends the quarantine of the Caribbean nation.

=== December ===
- December 2 – Vietnam War: after a trip to Vietnam at the request of U.S. President John F. Kennedy, U.S. Senate Majority Leader Mike Mansfield becomes the first American official to make a non-optimistic public comment on the war's progress.
- December 8 – The 1962 New York City newspaper strike begins, affecting all of the city's major newspapers; it lasts for 114 days.
- December 9 – Petrified Forest National Park is established.
- December 14 – U.S. spacecraft Mariner 2 flies by Venus, becoming the first probe to successfully transmit data from another planet.
- December 24 – Cuba releases the last 1,113 participants in the Bay of Pigs Invasion to the U.S., in exchange for food worth $53 million.
- December 30 – An unexpected storm buries Maine under five feet of snow, forcing the Bangor Daily News to miss a publication date for the first and only time in its history.

=== Undated ===
- American advertising man Martin K. Speckter invents the interrobang, a new English-language punctuation mark.
- La Grenouille French restaurant opens in midtown Manhattan.
- Publication of Helen Gurley Brown's Sex and the Single Girl.

=== Ongoing ===
- Cold War (1947–1991)
- Space Race (1957–1975)

== Births ==
=== January ===
- January 4
  - Harlan Coben, writer
  - Peter Steele, singer-songwriter and bass player (died 2010)
- January 5 – Suzy Amis Cameron, actress and model
- January 6
  - Michael Houser, singer-songwriter and guitarist (died 2002)
  - Kevin Rosier, mixed martial artist and boxer (died 2015)
- January 7 – Hallie Todd, actress, producer, and screenwriter
- January 12 – Luna Vachon, American-Canadian professional wrestler (died 2010)
- January 14 – Michael McCaul, lawyer and politician
- January 17 – Denis O'Hare, actor
- January 18 – Mike Lynch, cartoonist
- January 19 – Cynthia Coffman, convicted murderer
- January 21 – Brian Hildebrand, wrestler, referee and manager (died 1999)
- January 24 – Stephen Gould, opera singer (died 2023)
- January 25 – Christopher Coppola, film director and producer
- January 26
  - Malcom Gregory Scott, writer, activist, and AIDS survivor
  - Anna LaCazio, singer (Cock Robin)
- January 28 – Creflo Dollar, evangelist
- January 30 – Mary Kay Letourneau, child rapist (died 2020)
- January 31 – David Oliver, actor (died 1992)

=== February ===
- February 2 – Michael T. Weiss, actor
- February 4
  - Clint Black, country musician, record producer, and actor
  - Jim O'Heir, actor and comedian
- February 5 – Jennifer Jason Leigh, actress
- February 6 – Axl Rose, rock singer
- February 7
  - Garth Brooks, country singer-songwriter
  - David Bryan, rock musician (Bon Jovi)
  - Guy Moon, composer (died 2026)
- February 10 – Lisa Blunt Rochester, politician
- February 11
  - Tammy Baldwin, U.S. Senator from Wisconsin from 2013
  - Sheryl Crow, musician and singer
- February 22 – Lenda Murray, bodybuilder
- February 23 – Frank Luntz, political consultant

=== March ===
- March 2 – Jon Bon Jovi, American musician
- March 3
  - Jackie Joyner-Kersee, athlete
  - Herschel Walker, American football player
- March 7
  - James Barnes, murderer (died 2023)
  - Cathy Wood, serial killer
- March 10
  - Jasmine Guy, actress, director, singer and dancer
  - Dan O'Shannon, television writer and producer
- March 11
  - Jeffrey Nordling, actor
  - Barbara Alyn Woods, actress
- March 12
  - Chris Sanders, filmmaker, animator, and voice actor
  - Darryl Strawberry, baseball player
  - Titus Welliver, actor
- March 15 – Jimmy Baio, actor
- March 18
  - Thomas Ian Griffith, actor, producer, screenwriter, musician and martial artist
  - Mike Rowe, television personality and presenter
- March 21
  - Matthew Broderick, actor
  - Rosie O'Donnell, comedian
- March 24 – Star Jones, TV personality
- March 26
  - Chris Bailey, animator and film director
  - John Stockton, basketball player
  - Keith Diamond, actor and voice actor
- March 30
  - Mark Begich, U.S. Senator from Alaska from 2009 to 2015
  - MC Hammer, rapper
  - Bil Dwyer, stand-up comedian and game show host
- March 31 – Stockton Rush, engineer, pilot, and businessman (died 2023)

=== April ===
- April 2 – Clark Gregg, actor, director, and screenwriter
- April 3 – Mike Ness, musician
- April 4 – Melissa Hart (politician), lawyer and politician
- April 6 – Steven Levitan, director, writer and producer
- April 7 – Hugh O'Connor, actor, son of Carroll O'Connor (died 1995)
- April 8 – Izzy Stradlin, guitarist
- April 10
  - Rick Florian, Christian musician and real estate agent
  - Steve Tasker, American football player
- April 14 – Laura Richardson, politician
- April 15 – Tom Kane, voice actor
- April 16
  - Antony Blinken, 71st secretary of state
  - Douglas Elmendorf, economist and politician
  - Ian MacKaye, singer-songwriter, guitarist, and producer
  - Jason Scheff, bassist
- April 17 – Bill Kopp, actor, voice actor and animator
- April 20
  - Scott McGehee, film director and screenwriter
  - Hank the Angry Drunken Dwarf (Henry Joseph Nasiff Jr.), comedian (died 2001)
- April 21
  - Craig Robinson, college basketball coach
  - Carmen Osbahr, American-Mexican muppeteer
- April 26
  - Michael Damian, actor, recording artist and producer
  - Debra Wilson, actress and comedian
- April 28 – Scott La Rock, hip-hop DJ and producer (died 1987)
- April 30 – Tom Fahn, voice actor

=== May ===
- May 2 – Elizabeth Berridge, actress
- May 5 – Robby Robbins, politician
- May 7 – Robbie Knievel, motorcyclist and daredevil performer (died 2023)
- May 12 – Emilio Estevez, actor, director, and writer
- May 22 – Brian Pillman, pro wrestler (died 1997)
- May 24 – Robert J. Cerfolio, thoracic surgeon and medical educator
- May 25 – Lionel James, American football player (died 2022)
- May 28 – James Michael Tyler, actor (died 2021)

=== June ===
- June 1 – Sherri Howard, Olympic athlete
- June 2 – Dan Hicks, sportscaster (died 2026)
- June 3 – David Cole, DJ, producer and songwriter (died 1995)
- June 5 – Jeff Garlin, comedian and actor
- June 7 – Lance Reddick, actor (died 2023)
- June 8 – Suzy Gorman, photographer
- June 12 – Jodi Thelen, actress
- June 13
  - Ally Sheedy, actress
  - Hannah Storm, television anchor and presenter
- June 19 – Paula Abdul, musician and judge on American Idol
- June 23
  - Mark DeCarlo, actor
  - Billy Wirth, actor, film producer and artist
- June 24
  - Keith Browner, American football player (died 2025)
  - Sean Vincent Gillis, serial killer
  - Andrew P. Gordon, judge
- June 25 – Anthony Allen Shore, serial killer and child molester (died 2018)
- June 28 – Don Chambers, newspaper comic strip artist
- June 29 – Michael J. Juneau, jurist (died 2023)
- June 30 – Deirdre Lovejoy, actress

=== July ===
- July 1 – Andre Braugher, actor (died 2023)
- July 2 – Doug Benson, comedian, marijuana rights advocate, television host and actor
- July 3
  - Tom Cruise, actor and film producer
  - Thomas Gibson, actor
  - Hunter Tylo, actress and author, previously model
- July 4 – Pam Shriver, tennis player
- July 5 – Jeff Innis, baseball player (died 2022)
- July 7
  - Tom Conroy, state legislator
  - MC Jazzy Jeff, rapper
- July 8 – Joan Osborne, singer-songwriter
- July 9
- July 12 – Dan Murphy, rock guitarist
- July 13 – Tom Kenny, actor and comedian
- July 14 – Jeff Olson, percussionist (Trouble)
- July 15 – Glen Edward Rogers, serial killer
- July 17 – Fred Wadsworth, professional golfer
- July 18
  - Lee Arenberg, actor
  - Jack Irons, drummer
- July 20 – Carlos Alazraqui, actor
- July 22 – Steve Albini, musician and music producer (died 2024)
- July 28 – Ray Shero, ice hockey executive (died 2025)
- July 31 – Kevin Greene, footballer (died 2020)

=== August ===
- August 4
  - Roger Clemens, baseball player
  - Jim Hagedorn, politician (died 2022)
- August 7 – Cecil Exum, basketball player (died 2023)
- August 8 – Jim Sweeney, footballer (died 2022)
- August 10 – Suzanne Collins, author and television writer
- August 16 – Steve Carell, comedian, actor, voice artist, producer, writer and director
- August 17 – John Marshall Jones, actor
- August 24 – Major Garrett, journalist and author
- August 25 – Tommy Blacha, comedy writer
- August 26 – Bob Mionske, cyclist and attorney
- August 28
  - Craig Anton, actor and comedian
  - David Fincher, director and producer
- August 31 – Dee Bradley Baker, voice actor

=== September ===
- September 5 – Brian A. Joyce, politician (died 2018)
- September 6 – Chris Christie, 55th Governor of New Jersey
- September 8 – Miss Amy, musical fitness entertainer and songwriter
- September 9 – Mark Linkous, singer, songwriter and musician (died 2010)
- September 11 – Kristy McNichol, actress and singer
- September 12 – Amy Yasbeck, actress
- September 14 – Tom Kurvers, ice hockey player (died 2021)
- September 15
  - Dina Lohan, television personality
  - Rebecca Miller, actress and director
- September 17 – Don Rogers, American football player (died 1986)
- September 26
  - Gregory Crewdson, photographer
  - Al Pitrelli, guitarist
- September 27 – Norman Hutchins, gospel musician (died 2025)

=== October ===
- October 1 – Esai Morales, actor
- October 6 – Rich Yett, baseball player
- October 11
  - Joan Cusack, actress and comedian
  - Leslie Landon, actress
- October 12
  - Chris Botti, trumpeter and composer
  - Sid Fernandez, baseball player
  - Deborah Foreman, actress
- October 13
  - T'Keyah Crystal Keymáh, actress and comedian
  - Kelly Preston, actress (died 2020)
- October 15 – Aron Ra, author, podcaster and atheist activist
- October 21 – Drew Griffin, journalist (died 2022)
- October 23
  - Doug Flutie, American football player
  - Mike Tomczak, American football player
- October 24
  - Dave Blaney, race car driver
  - Mark Miller, motorcycle racer
  - Jay Novacek, American football player and coach

=== November ===
- November 3 – Gabe Newell, co-founder and managing director of Valve
- November 10 – David Petrarca, television, film and theatre director, producer
- November 11 – Demi Moore, actress, film producer, film director, songwriter and model
- November 15
  - Mark Acres, basketball player and educator
  - Judy Gold, comedian, actress and producer
- November 18 – Kirk Hammett, metal guitarist (Exodus and Metallica)
- November 19
  - Jodie Foster, actress, film director and producer
  - Sean Parnell, 10th Governor of Alaska
- November 20 – Gail Ann Dorsey, musician
- November 27 – Conrad Anker, mountaineer
- November 28 – Jon Stewart, comedian and political commentator
- November 30 – Bo Jackson, baseball and football player

=== December ===
- December 9 – Felicity Huffman, actress
- December 12 – Peter Bergen, journalist and author
- December 17
  - Richard Jewell, victim of defamation (died 2007)
  - Margaret Jane Wray, operatic soprano (died 2025)
- December 21 – Steven Mnuchin, 77th United States Secretary of the Treasury
- December 24 – Kate Spade, born Katherine Brosnahan, fashion designer (died 2018)
- December 31
  - Don Diamont, actor
  - Jeff Flake, politician

== Deaths ==
=== January ===
- January 9 – Leroy Shield, film score and radio compose (born 1893)
- January 13 – Ernie Kovacs, comedian and actor (born 1919)
- January 19 – Snub Pollard, actor (born 1889)
- January 20 – Robinson Jeffers, poet (born 1887)
- January 25 – Lucy Robins Lang, political activist (born 1884)
- January 26 – Lucky Luciano, gangster (born 1897)
- January 29 – Fritz Kreisler, Austrian-born American violinist and compose (born 1875)

=== February ===
- February 1 – Carey Wilson, screenwriter (born 1889)
- February 6 – Roy Atwell, actor, comedian and composer (born 1878)
- February 17 – Joseph Kearns, actor (born 1907)
- February 19
  - James Barton, actor (born 1890)
  - Georgios Papanikolaou, cytopathologist, inventor of the Pap smear (born 1883)
- February 27 – Willie Best, actor (born 1916)
- February 28 – Chic Johnson, actor (born 1891)

=== March ===
- March 1
  - Roscoe Ates, actor (born 1895)
  - Arnold Kirkeby, hotelier, art collector, and real estate developer (born 1901)
  - Emelyn Whiton, Olympic sailor (born 1916)
- March 15 – Arthur Compton, physicist, recipient of the Nobel Prize in Physics in 1927 (born 1892)
- March 27 – Augusta Savage, African American sculptor (born 1892)

=== April ===
- April 8 – Esther Kerr Rusthoi, author, poet, composer, singer, and evangelist (born 1909)
- April 10
  - Michael Curtiz, Hungarian-American director (born 1886)
  - Manton S. Eddy, general (born 1892)
- April 15 – Clara Blandick (born 1876)
- April 20 – Grover Whalen, politician (born 1886)
- April 24 – Milt Franklyn, film composer (born 1897)
- April 27 – Wendell Holmes, actor (born 1914)

=== May ===
- May – Helen Tufts Bailie, social reformer and activist (born 1874)
- May 12 – Dick Calkins, comic book writer (Buck Rogers) (born 1894)
- May 28 – Robert Francis Anthony Studds, admiral and engineer, fourth Director of the United States Coast and Geodetic Survey (born 1896)
- May 31 – Henry F. Ashurst, politician (born 1874)

=== June ===
- June 6 – Guinn "Big Boy" Williams, actor (born 1899)
- June 9 – Polly Adler, brothel owner (born 1900)
- June 19
  - Frank Borzage, film director and actor (born 1894)
  - Will Wright, actor (born 1894)
- June 28 – Mickey Cochrane, baseball player and manager (born 1903)

=== July ===
- July 2 – Valeska Suratt, stage actress and silent film star (born 1882)
- July 6 – William Faulkner, fiction writer, recipient of the Nobel Prize in Literature in 1949 (born 1897)
- July 25 – Nelle Wilson Reagan, mother of United States President Ronald Reagan (born 1883)

=== August ===
- August 5 – Marilyn Monroe, film actress and icon (born 1926)
- August 23 – Hoot Gibson, actor (born 1892)
- August 28 – John Collum, child actor (born 1926)

=== September ===
- September 2 – Morris Louis, painter (born 1912)
- September 3 – E. E. Cummings, poet (born 1894)
- September 7 – Louis King, film director (born 1898)
- September 19 – Ben J. Tarbutton, interpreter (born 1885)
- September 24
  - Sam McDaniel, actor (born 1886)
  - Charles Reisner, silent film actor and director (born 1887)

=== October ===
- October 2 – Frank Lovejoy, actor (born 1912)
- October 6 – Tod Browning, film director, actor, screenwriter, vaudeville performer, and carnival sideshow and entertainer (born 1880)
- October 7 – Scrapper Blackwell, blues guitarist and singer (born 1903)
- October 26 – Louise Beavers, actress (born 1900)

=== November ===
- November 7 – Eleanor Roosevelt, First Lady of the United States from 1933 to 1945 (born 1884)
- November 8
  - William Bailey, actor (born 1886)
  - Willis H. O'Brien, stop motion animator (born 1886)
- November 9 – Carroll McComas, actress (born 1886)
- November 18 – Dennis Chávez, U.S. Senator from New Mexico from 1935 to 1962 (born 1888)

=== December ===
- December 4 – Jens Christian Bay, writer and librarian (born 1871 in Denmark)
- December 6 – Harry Bauler, politician (born 1910)
- December 7 – Bobo Newsom, baseball player (born 1907)
- December 10 – Robert C. Giffen, admiral (born 1886)
- December 15 – Charles Laughton, British-American actor (born 1899)
- December 16 – Lew Landers, television and film director (born 1901)
- December 17 – Thomas Mitchell, Irish-American actor and writer (born 1892)
- December 22 – Roy Palmer, jazz trombonist (born 1892)
- December 31 – Al Mamaux, baseball player and manager (born 1894)

== See also ==
- List of American films of 1962
- Timeline of United States history (1950–1969)
