= Greg Thomson (disambiguation) =

Greg Thomson is an Australian journalist.

Greg Thomson may also refer to:

- Greg Thomson (ice hockey) (born 1963)

== See also ==
- Greg Thompson (disambiguation)
