= Admiral Bryant =

Admiral Bryant may refer to:

- Carleton F. Bryant (1892–1987), U.S. Navy vice admiral
- Gregory R. Bryant (born 1950), U.S. Navy rear admiral
- Samuel W. Bryant (1877–1938), U.S. Navy rear admiral
