= Donald Chambers =

Donald Chambers may refer to:

- Don Chambers, author and artist of the Mannequins comic strip
- Donald Eugene Chambers, founder of the Bandidos motorcycle gang
- Donald Chambers (author), councillor and heritage advocate in Victoria, Australia
