= Gregory Thompson =

Gregory, Gregg or Greg Thompson may refer to:

- Greg Thompson (1947–2019), Canadian politician and long-serving MP
- Gregg Thompson (born 1961), American professional soccer player
- Greg Thompson (American football) (born 1950), American college football coach
- Gregg Thompson (astronomer), Australian amateur astronomer
- Greg Thompson (bishop) (born 1956), Anglican bishop of Newcastle (Australia) and formerly the Northern Territory of Australia
- Greg Thompson (cricketer) (born 1987), Irish cricketer for Lancashire and Hampshire
- Gregory Thompson (South African cricketer) (born 1971), South African cricketer
- Gregory Thompson (writer), American television producer and writer
- Greg Thompson (music executive), American record executive
- Greg Thompson (Canadian football) (born 1940s), Canadian football player
- Gregory Thompson (discus thrower) (born 1994), British discus thrower, 2018 All-American for the Maryland Terrapins track and field team

== See also ==
- Greg Thomson (disambiguation)
