= Greg Wood =

Greg Wood may refer to:

- Greg Wood (actor), British actor
- Greg Wood (cricketer) (born 1988), English cricketer
- Greg Wood (footballer) (born 1953), Australian footballer for Melbourne
- Greg Wood (guitarist), former guitarist for the band Punchline
- Greg Wood (magician), Canadian magician
- Greg Wood (racing driver), racing driver who competed in the 2009 Pickup Truck Racing season
