= Gregory Lake =

Gregory or Greg Lake may refer to:

- Greg Lake (1947–2016), English musician, member of the band King Crimson and the trio Emerson, Lake, and Palmer
  - Greg Lake (album), a 1981 debut studio album by Greg Lake
- Greg Lake (radio personality) (born 1960), Florida radio personality
- Greg Lake, a personality on Geordie Shore (series 1)
- Gregory Lake (La Jacques-Cartier), Quebec, Canada

== See also ==
- Lake Gregory (disambiguation), a list of lakes
- Gregg Lake, Alberta, Canada
