= Greg Long =

Greg Long may refer to:

- Greg Long (singer) (born 1966), contemporary Christian music singer and member of Avalon
- Greg Long (surfer) (born 1984), American surfer from San Clemente, California

== See also ==
- Gregory Long
