= Greg Young =

Greg Young may refer to:

- Greg Young (footballer) (born 1983), English footballer
- Greg Young (basketball), American basketball coach
- Greg Young (planner), Australian urban planner
