= Gregory Martin =

Gregory or Greg Martin may refer to:

- Gregory Martin (scholar) (c. 1542–1582), Catholic Priest, scholar, and Bible translator
- Greg Martin (entrepreneur), entrepreneur and cyber security expert
- Sir Greg Martin, London, executive headteacher
- Gregory J. Martin, American medical doctor and U.S. Navy captain
- Gregory Paul Martin (born 1957), British actor
- Gregory S. Martin (born 1948), USAF general
- Greg Martin (rugby union) (born 1963), Australian rugby union player
- Greg Martin (politician) (born 1963), American politician in the Tennessee House of Representatives
- Greg Martin (born 1954), member of the Kentucky Headhunters
- Gregg F. Martin (born 1956), US Army major general (retired)
