= Gregory Moore =

Gregory or Greg Moore may refer to:

- Gregory L. Moore, American journalist and editor of the Denver Post
- Gregory J. Moore, American political scientist
- Greg Moore (American football) (born 1965), American football player; see 1987 New England Patriots season
- Greg Moore (racing driver) (1975–1999), racecar driver
- Greg Moore (ice hockey) (born 1984), American ice hockey player
- Greg Moore (guitarist), American rhythm guitarist with Earth, Wind & Fire
- Greg Moore (physicist) (born 1961), string theorist at Rutgers University
- Gregg Moore, member of the Eau Claire County Board of Supervisors and the current chairperson
- Greg Moore (baseball) (born 1977), American college baseball coach
