= Greg Garcia =

Greg Garcia may refer to:

- Greg Garcia (baseball) (born 1989), American baseball player
- Greg Garcia (government official), assistant secretary for cyber-security and telecommunications under the United States Department of Homeland Security
- Greg Garcia (producer) (born 1970), American television director and producer
