= Greg Burke =

Greg Burke may refer to:

- Greg Burke (athletic director), director of athletics for Northwestern State University
- Greg Burke (baseball) (born 1982), Major League Baseball relief pitcher who played for San Diego and the New York Mets
- Greg Burke (journalist) (born 1959), American former TV news correspondent and adviser to Pope Francis
- Greg Burke (rugby league) (born 1993), rugby league player

== See also ==
- Gregory Burke (born 1968), Scottish playwright
- Gregory Burke (curator), Canadian museum director, writer and curator
