= Greg Stevens =

Greg Stevens may refer to:

- Greg Stevens (Alberta politician) (born 1935), Canadian politician
- Greg Stevens (Iowa politician) (born 1960), American politician
- Greg Stevens (writer), Australian television writer
