= Lee Gregory =

Lee Gregory may refer to:

- Lee Gregory (baseball) (born 1938), American baseball pitcher
- Lee Gregory (footballer) (born 1988), English footballer for Sheffield Wednesday

== See also ==
- Gregory Lee (disambiguation)
