= Greg Scott =

Greg or Gregory Scott may refer to:

- Gregory Scott (1879–?), British film actor
- Gregory K. Scott (c. 1949–2021), Colorado Supreme Court justice
- Greg Scott (American football) (born 1979), former American football defensive end
- Greg Scott (ice hockey) (born 1988), Canadian ice hockey right winger
- Greg Scott (politician), member of the Pennsylvania House of Representatives (2023 – present)
- Greg Scott (rugby league) (born 1991), rugby league footballer
- Greg Scott (violinist), English violinist
- Malcom Gregory Scott, (born 1962) American writer, activist, and AIDS survivor
