= Gregory Howard =

Gregory Howard may refer to:

- Gregory M. Howard, American pastor and professor of religious studies
- Gregory Allen Howard (1962–2023), American screenwriter
- Greg Howard (musician) (1964–2023), American musician
- Greg Howard (basketball) (born 1948), American basketball player
- Greg Howard (politician), American politician in Connecticut
