= Greg Bryant =

Greg or Gregory Bryant may refer to:

- Greg Bryant (computer scientist), American computer scientist
- Greg Bryant (astronomer), namesake of 9984 Gregbryant
- Greg Bryant (American football), see 2012 USA Today All-USA high school football team
- Gregory R. Bryant (born 1950), United States Navy admiral
