= Greg Peters =

Greg Peters may refer to:

- Greg Peters (American football) (born 1955), former American football player
- Greg Peters (businessman), American businessman
- Greg Peters (cartoonist) (1962–2013), American cartoonist

== See also ==
- Greg Peterson (disambiguation)
