= Greg Wells (disambiguation) =

Greg Wells is a Canadian record producer and songwriter.

Greg Wells may also refer to:

- Greg Wells (baseball) (born 1954), baseball player
- Greg Wells (footballer, born 1950), Australian rules footballer for Melbourne and Carlton
- Greg Wells (footballer, born 1952), Australian rules footballer for Geelong
