= Greg Davis =

Greg Davis may refer to:

== Arts ==
- Greg Davis (actor) (born 1993), from Louisiana, US
- Greg Davis (musician) (born 1975), experimental electronic musician
- Greg Davis, country-punk singer in Blood on the Saddle

== Sport ==
- Greg Davis (American football coach) (born 1951)
- Greg Davis (Australian footballer) (born 1955), Australian-rules footballer for Footscray
- Greg Davis (basketball) (born 1982)
- Greg Davis (bowls) (born 1988), lawn bowler from Jersey
- Greg Davis (ice hockey) (born 1979), Canadian ice hockey player
- Greg Davis (placekicker) (born 1965), American football player in the NFL
- Greg Davis (rugby union) (1939–1979), Australian rugby union captain

== Other people ==
- Greg Davis (Canadian politician), in New Brunswick, Canada
- Greg Davis (Mississippi politician) (born 1966), mayor and US congressional candidate
- Greg Davis, executive at investment company The Vanguard Group

== See also ==
- Greg Davies (born 1968), British comedian and actor
