= Greg Hill =

Greg Hill or Gregory Hill may refer to:

- Greg A. Hill (artist), Kanyen'kehaka (Mohawk) artist and curator
- Greg Hill (author), American musician and author
- Greg Hill (cornerback) (born 1961), American football cornerback
- Greg Hill (cricketer) (born 1972), English cricketer
- Greg Hill (poet), poet and editor
- Greg Hill (politician), New Hampshire politician
- Greg Hill (running back) (born 1972), American football running back
- Gregory Hill (1941–2000), American religious writer, also known as Malaclypse the Younger
- Gregory Hill (hill), a hill (or Marilyn) in Ireland
