= Greg Williams =

Greg or Gregory Williams may refer to:

- Greg Williams (American football coach) (born 1976), American football coach in the NFL
- Greg Williams (Australian footballer) (born 1963), Australian rules football in the AFL
- Greg Williams (basketball) (born 1947), American college and professional women's basketball coach
- Greg Williams (comics), American comic creator
- Greg Williams (photographer) (born 1972), British editorial and film photographer
- Greg Williams (safety) (born 1959), American football safety in the NFL
- Greg Williams (sportscaster) (born 1960), American radio personality
- Greg Williams, member of the band Switch (1976–present)
- Gregory Alan Williams (born 1956), American actor and author
- Gregory B. Williams (born 1969), American judge
- Gregory H. Williams (1943–2025), American academic
- Woody Williams (Gregory Scott Williams, born 1966), former Major League Baseball pitcher

== See also ==
- Gregg Williams (born 1958), American football coach
