= Greg Stekelman =

British novelist and writer (born 1975)

Greg Stekelman (born 1975 in London) is a British novelist and writer.

== Life ==
Born and raised in north London, Stekelman started themanwhofellasleep.com in 2001. The website is an eclectic mix of his writing, illustrations, animations and features. The website is popular in the UK and has featured in a number of newspapers, from The Guardian to the Sunday Times.

In 2005 Time Out London started using his Tube Gossip column as a weekly feature under the heading Overheard Underground. April 2006 saw The Friday Project releasing Stekelman's first novel; A Year in the Life of TheManWhoFellAsleep, based on writing from his website.

Reviews of A Year in the Life of TheManWhoFellAsleep have been positive, with Time Out London saying "This odd, excellent, fantastical diary offers a curious combination of dreams, London and deadpan humour, all wrapped in up in a quasi-fictional journal with funny illustrations".Vice Magazine UK called it "...one of the most imaginative and enjoyable diaries published since Brian Eno's A Year with Swollen Appendices" and described Stekelman as a "Woody Allen for the iPod generation" . Zoo Magazine described it as a "surreal, morbidly entertaining novel written as a diary".

Stekelman's second book, London Tales, was published in November 2011 by Timeline Books.
