= Gregory Long =

- Born: 1946 (age 79–80); Kansas City, Missouri
- Occupation: President Emeritus of The New York Botanical Garden

Gregory Long is President Emeritus of The New York Botanical Garden in the Bronx, New York.

== Early years and education ==
Gregory Long was born in 1946 in Kansas City, Missouri, and raised in Minneapolis, Minnesota. He graduated from New York University in 1969 with a degree in art history with academic interests in the Italian Renaissance, particularly early Renaissance painting and architecture.

== Career ==
He began his career at The Metropolitan Museum of Art in 1969, where he worked as Executive Assistant to the Secretary of the Corporation and President of the Board. He then held positions at the Brooklyn Museum, the American Museum of Natural History, and the New York Zoological Society (now the Wildlife Conservation Society). Throughout the 1980s, he served as vice president for Public Affairs at The New York Public Library. In 1989 he was elected the eighth President and chief executive officer of the New York Botanical Garden, a position he served in until 2018. During his twenty-nine-year tenure with the New York Botanical Gardens, Long completed more than twenty capital projects, including the Edible Academy. The $28 Million project was built to provide year-round educational opportunities; the Edible Academy consists of high-tech classrooms, a teaching kitchen, a freestanding greenhouse, teaching pavilions, dedicated gardening plots, and an amphitheater. The Edible Academy is one of the most extensive educational programs in the United States, teaching more than 100,000 people yearly about organic gardening and healthy eating.

== Publications ==
Long is the author of Historic Houses of the Hudson River Valley, published in 2004 by Rizzoli in association with the Preservation League of New York State. He is the editor of The New York Botanical Garden (2016), an illustrated and updated volume documenting the institution's history and collections.

- Long, Gregory (2004). Historic Houses of the Hudson River Valley, 1663–1915. Rizzoli International Publications. Preservation League of New York State. OCLC 56650634 (all editions).
- Long, Gregory; Forrest, Todd A., eds. (April 15, 2016). The New York Botanical Garden (revised and updated). Lederman, Larry (photographer) (2016 ed.). Abrams Inc. LCCN 2006-10799; ISBN 978-1-4197-1975-2, 1-4197-1975-0; OCLC 925390751 (all editions).
- Four 7-Year NYBG Strategic Plans. Long, Gregory, Executive Editor. OCLC 6779620125 (outline of 2 strategic plans).
1. "The New York Botanical Garden Plan for 1993–1999". 1992.
2. "2001–2007: Plan for a New Era". 2000.
3. "A New Strategic Plan: Into the 21st Century 2009–2015". The Bronx. 2008. OCLC 761742378
4. "125th Anniversary Strategic Plan: 2016–2021" (PDF). 2015.
- Long, Gregory (Fall 2006). "The Botanical Garden – The New York Botanical Garden". SiteLINES: A Journal of Place. 2 (1). Foundation for Landscape Studies: 13–15. JSTOR 24889261 (article); ISSN 2572-0481 (online); ISSN 2572-0481 (print); OCLC 809603830 (all editions) (publication).
- Lowry, Susan; Berner, Nancy (2010). Gardens of the Hudson Valley. Photographs by Steve Gross and Susan Daley; Foreword by Gregory Long. New York: Monacelli Press. ISBN 978-1-5809-3277-6, 1-5809-3277-0; OCLC 503041926 (all editions).
- Keen, Mary (2019). Paradise and Plenty: A Rothschild Family Garden. Photos by Tom Hatton; Foreword by Gregory Long, New York Botanical Garden President Emeritus. ISBN 978-1-9102-5875-0, 1-9102-5875-X; OCLC 1084387365 (all editions).
- Long, Gregory (2022). Rescue and Revival: New York Botanical Garden, 1989–2018. Foreword by Robin Lane Fox. Amherst, Massachusetts: Library of American Landscape History. ISBN 978-1-9526-2037-9, 1-9526-2037-6; OCLC 1260191068 (all editions).
