= Greg Stevens (writer) =

Australian writer and script editor

Greg Stevens was an Australian writer and script editor.

He was a writer and script editor on Sons and Daughters and was a story editor and script editor on Home and Away for eight years during its formative years.

In 1996 he went to work on Neighbours as a script producer. In December 1996 he was arrested on charges of having sex with a 14-year-old boy and resigned from his position. He was given a 12-month gaol sentence suspended for two years.

Stevens then moved to Europe and worked on shows there.

== Select Credits ==
- Waterloo Station
- Sons and Daughters – script editor, writer
- Home and Away – story editor, script editor, writer, script producer (1993)
- Neighbours – script producer (1996)
- Barátok közt (1998) – head writer
- Verbotene Liebe (1998) – story editor
- Skilda världar (1998–2002) – story consultant
- Salatut elämät (1999) – original idea
- Szeress most! (2003) – head writer
