= Gregg Moore =

American politician

Chairperson of the Eau Claire County Board of Supervisors
- In office April 15, 2008 – April 17, 2018
- Preceded by: Bruce Willett
- Succeeded by: Nick Smiar

Member of the Eau Claire County Board of Supervisors from District 17
- In office April 20, 2004 – April 17, 2018

Personal details
- Party: Democratic
- Education: University of Dayton University of Pittsburgh

Gregg Moore is an American politician from the State of Wisconsin who served as a member of the County Board of Supervisors in Eau Claire County, Wisconsin. After his first four years on the Eau Claire County Board of Supervisors, Moore was unanimously elected board chair on April 15, 2008, and then on April 20, 2010. He served as chair of the Administration Committee and is an ex officio member of all standing committees.

In the past, he served on the Budget and Finance Committee, Administration Committee and Human Services Board. He is affiliated with the Democratic Party. Moore serves as President of the Wisconsin Access to Justice Commission. He was the first chair of the Wisconsin Geographic Information Coordination Council.

== Career ==
In February 2008, Moore retired after 24 years as district court administrator for the Wisconsin Supreme Court’s Tenth Judicial Administrative District, which includes the 13 counties in northwest Wisconsin. During his tenure with the Wisconsin Court System, Gregg served for 20 years on the Steering Committee for the court system's statewide automation system known as CCAP. He chaired a subcommittee to study and recommend policies concerning public access to electronic records.

Moore also served on the Board of Directors of the National Association for Court Management, and on the Joint Technology Committee, which included representatives from the Conference of State Court Administrators. From the late 1970s to early 1990s, he was an active leader with Sierra Club. In 1990, he was appointed to the Wisconsin Legislative Council's Special Committee on Surface Water Resources. Gregg received his undergraduate degree in secondary education from the University of Dayton in 1973, and he earned his Masters of Public Administration degree from the University of Pittsburgh in 1975.

== See also ==
- Eau Claire County Board of Supervisors

Political offices
Preceded by Bruce Willett	Chair, Eau Claire County Board of Supervisors; April 2008–2018	Incumbent
