= Greg Burke (athletic director) =

American college athletics director (born 1956)

Biographical details
- Born: October 22, 1956 (age 70)
- Education: Mount Union (1978); Kent State (1986)

Administrative career (AD unless noted)
- 1996–2022: Northwestern State

Greg Burke (born October 22, 1956) is a former college athletic administrator. He was most recently the director of athletics for Northwestern State University from 1996 to 2022. He was hired in 1996 to replace long time Northwestern State athletic director Tynes Hildebrand. He currently works as the Director of Business Development and Public Relations for the Louisiana Sports Hall of Fame Foundation.
