= Greg Thompson (music executive) =

American record executive

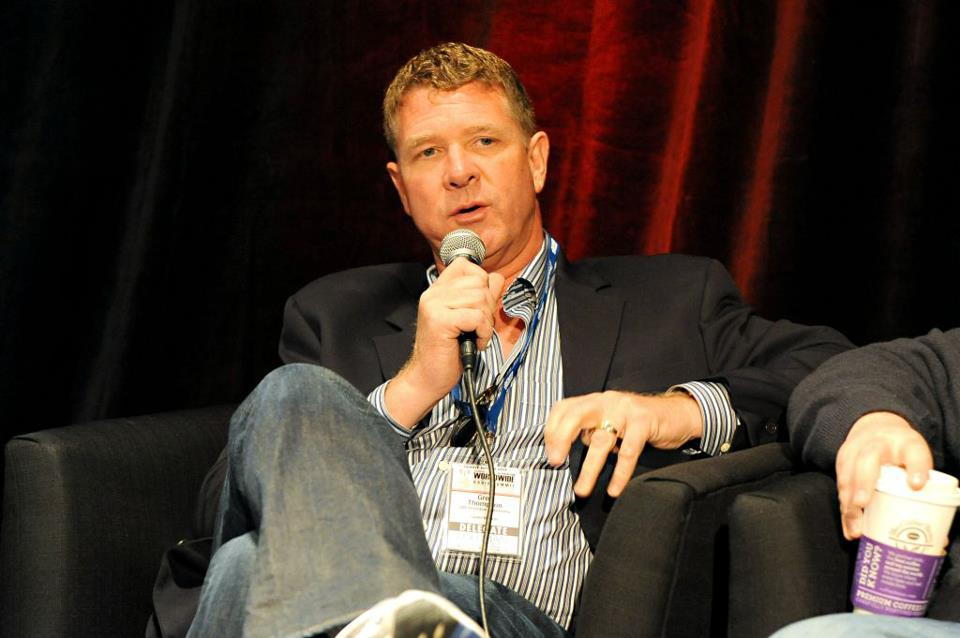
- Greg Thompson participating in an All Access Radio summit, June 2012.

Background information
- Birth name: Gregory R. Thompson
- Born: May 29th
- Origin: Royal Oak, Michigan, US; resides Los Angeles, US
- Occupations: President and Partner, Big Loud

Greg Thompson is an American record executive currently serving as president and partner of Big Loud Management and Big Loud Rock record label. He is well known for his previous roles at Maverick Entertainment., Capitol Music Group and EMI Records. Following Capitol's sale to Universal Music Group, he remained with the company during its move to Hollywood, California.

Thompson has played a critical role in the careers of artists such as Katy Perry, U2, Morgan Wallen, Coldplay, Doja Cat, and many others. Previously, he worked at Island Def Jam, Elektra Records, and Chrysalis Records in various senior management roles.

Thompson currently resides in Los Angeles, CA with his family.

== Childhood ==
Born and raised in Royal Oak, Michigan, Thompson grew up the youngest of six brothers, to Father Jim and Mother Nora (née Kelly). He attended Catholic High School at the National Shrine of the Little Flower parish, where he graduated early. Thompson attended Michigan State University for his undergraduate studies. He graduated with a degree in Telecommunications.

== Career ==
=== Early Years: Chrysalis and Elektra ===
While attending Michigan State University Thompson worked as a College Rep. for CBS Records. After graduation, he took a job at Chrysalis Records doing local radio promotion. Eventually Thompson was promoted to 'Vice President of Top 40 promotion' at Chrysalis in New York, but left after five years to pursue a job doing independent promotion.

He later rejoined the major label world as Senior Vice President of Promotion at SBK Records. SBK Records eventually merged with EMI Records and Chrysalis Records to form what would be known as EMI Record Group North America. After two years with EMI, Thompson was recruited by East West Records, a division of the Atlantic Records, and took on a new role as Senior VP of Promotion. During his first year, Atlantic consolidated East West with sister label Elektra Records and restructured company management. Thompson was retained as Senior Vice President and spent 11 years with the company. He left in 2004 after six years as the company's Executive Vice President and General Manager. At Elektra Thompson worked with Jason Mraz, Missy Elliott, Third Eye Blind, Metallica, AC-DC, and many others.

=== Years at Island Def Jam ===
In January 2005, Thompson took a job to reorganize the Island Def Jam label, after a major management shift. His initial six months were spent recruiting and reorganizing the company's market, sales, and creative services. Eventually, he moved into the role of Executive Vice President of promotion, New Media, and tour marketing. Thompson led the label to achieve the number one market share for the first time in the label's history. Thompson was responsible for the day-to-day direction of promotion staff and worked under the direction of superiors L.A. Reid, Jay Z, and Steve Bartles.

The Island Def Jam roster during these years included Fall Out Boy, Ludacris, Kanye West, The Killers, Nickelback, Lionel Richie, and many more.

=== The Capitol Era ===
Thompson was recruited to EMI Records in February 2008. As the company's Executive Vice President of Promotion and Marketing for North America, he oversaw operations across EMI's family of labels. He played a role in the successful marketing of artists Katy Perry, Coldplay, David Guetta, Lady Antebellum, and Norah Jones.

At the end of 2012, Universal Music Group purchased EMI Music. In 2013, Thompson became the EVP of the newly reinvented Capitol Music Group, continuing to work with and develop artists such as Katy Perry, Bastille, Beck, Jennifer Lopez, Sam Smith and many more from Hollywood, CA.

=== Maverick Music ===
On April 6, 2016, it was announced that Thompson would be departing his position at Capitol to become President of Maverick Music, a conglomeration of some of the most powerful management companies in the world.

Maverick, founded by Madonna and U2 manager Guy Oseary in partnership with Live Nation, brought together globally renowned artist managers such as Scott Rodger (Sir Paul McCartney, Arcade Fire), Shawn Gee (The Roots, Jill Scott) Ron Laffitte (Pharrell Williams, One Republic, Alicia Keys), Clarence Spalding (Jason Aldean), Larry Rudolph (Miley Cyrus, Britney Spears) and Cortez Bryant & Gee Roberson (Nicki Minaj, Lil Wayne).

Thompson was involved in day-to-day management with artists like U2 and Madonna, and also launched Maverick Urban with the signing of Doja Cat and Brandy.

=== Big Loud Rock and Country Music Management ===
In early 2021 it was announced that Thompson would stay in the Live Nation family, but move to country-music Big Loud management as a Partner and President.

Upon Thompson's arrival, Big Loud launched a new rock label imprint Big Loud Rock. He is responsible for the day-to-day operations of a roster that includes Hardy, LetDown, Yam Haus, and others.
