= Greg Carey =

Greg Carey may refer to:

- Greg Carey (ice hockey) (born 1990), Canadian ice hockey player
- Greg Carey (voice actor), Australian-born voice actor
