= Greg Holland (disambiguation) =

Greg Holland may refer to:

- Greg Holland (musician) (born 1967), American country musician
- Greg Holland (born 1985), American baseball pitcher
- Greg Holland (meteorologist) (born 1948), Australian tropical cyclone researcher
