= Greg Marshall =

Greg, Gregg or Gregory Marshall may refer to:

== Sportsmen ==
- Greg Marshall (defensive lineman) (born 1956), Canadian Football League player and coach (Saskatchewan Roughriders, Edmonton Eskimos)
- Greg Marshall (running back) (born 1959), Canadian Football League player and coach (McMaster University, University of Western Ontario)
- Gregg Marshall (born 1963), American college basketball coach

== Others ==
- Gregory Marshall (1939–1989), American child and adolescent actor
- Greg Marshall (born 1973), English Labour Party candidate in 2019 Broxtowe (UK Parliament constituency)#Elections in the 2010s

== Characters ==
- Greg Marshall (Home and Away), appeared on Australian TV soap opera in 1991–93 and 2000
