= Gregory J. Martin =

American doctor, U.S. Navy captain and recipient of the Legion of Merit

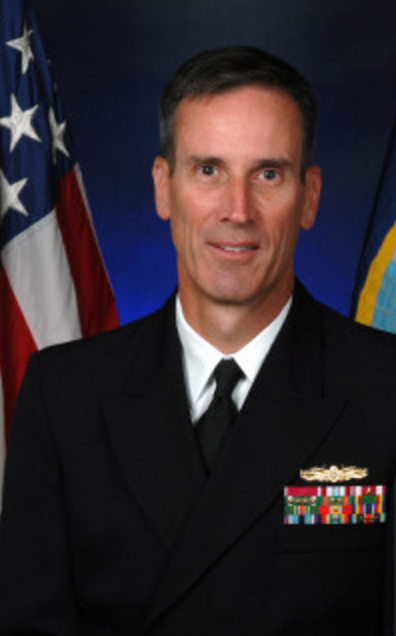

Gregory J. Martin is an American medical doctor and captain in the United States Navy. Martin is a recognized expert in the fields of infectious diseases and bioterrorism.

== Biography ==
Martin received his B.S. in biology from Fairfield University in 1980 and M.D. from the Georgetown University School of Medicine in 1986. Martin completed both his internal medicine internship from 1986 to 1987 and his internal medicine residency from 1989 to 1991 at the Naval Medical Center San Diego. He completed an infectious disease fellowship at the National Naval Medical Center between 1991 and 1993.

In 2002, the United States Secretary of the Navy conferred the Legion of Merit Award upon Martin for his pivotal role in the five-month investigation of the 2001 anthrax attacks as well as his role as the on-site infectious disease physician on Capitol Hill during the attacks and the treatment of the staff of Senator Tom Daschle in the aftermath of the attacks. Having served as the principal investigator for the anthrax vaccination protocol set up by the Centers for Disease Control following the attacks, he is also the lead author of a study of the clinical and immunologic responses to anthrax exposure.

In 2003, Martin led the military medical team that examined and cared for members of the United States Marine Corp who had contracted malaria while spending two weeks ashore in Liberia. More than 40 service members from the 26th Marine Expeditionary Unit based out of Camp Lejeune, North Carolina, who were deployed to Liberia in support of Joint Task Force Liberia became sick aboard the USS Carter Hall and the USS Iwo Jima. Fearing worse, Martin's testing efforts ruled out contagious diseases, like Lassa fever and Ebola which have much-higher mortality rates.

Martin is currently the director of the Infectious Disease Clinical Research Program (IDCRP) at the Uniformed Services University (USU). Previously, he served as assistant dean for special programs at USU, focused on the development of graduate courses and training in weapons of mass destruction. He also was the infectious disease program director at the National Naval Medical Center and Walter Reed Army Medical Center.
