= Greg Davis (Australian footballer) =

Australian rules footballer

Personal information
- Full name: Greg Davis
- Born: 1 June 1955 (age 71)
- Original team: Belgrave
- Height: 199 cm (6 ft 6 in)
- Weight: 89 kg (196 lb)

Playing career^{1}
Years	Club	Games (Goals)
1978–81	Footscray	5 (0)
- ^{1} Playing statistics correct to the end of 1981.

Greg Davis (born 1 June 1955) is a former Australian rules footballer who played with Footscray in the Victorian Football League (VFL).
