= Greg Evans =

Greg Evans may refer to:

- Greg Evans (American football) (born 1971), professional American football player
- Greg Evans (cartoonist) (born 1947), American cartoonist
- Greg Evans (One Life to Live), a fictional character on the American soap opera One Life to Live
- Greg Evans (RAAF officer) (born 1957), Air Vice Marshal, former Deputy Chief of Joint Operations (Australia)
- Greg Evans (television host) (born 1953), Australian television host
- Gregory Evans (judge) (1913–2010), Canadian judge
- Gregory Evans (dramatist), British radio and television playwright
