= Greg Malone =

Greg Malone may refer to:

- Greg Malone (actor) (born 1948), Canadian impressionist and actor
- Greg Malone (ice hockey) (born 1956), professional ice hockey player
