= Greg Taylor =

Greg (or Gregory) Taylor may refer to:

- Greg "Fingers" Taylor (1951–2023), American musician
- Greg Taylor (author) (born 1951), American children's and young-adult book author
- Greg Taylor (American football) (born 1958), American football player
- Greg Taylor (English footballer) (born 1990), Cambridge United FC player
- Greg Taylor (politician), Indiana senator
- Greg Taylor (public servant), Australian senior public servant
- Greg Taylor (Scottish footballer) (born 1997), Celtic FC player
- Gregory Taylor (cricketer) (born 1987), Bahamian cricketer
- Gregory W. Taylor, former Chief Public Officer of Health of Canada

== See also ==
- Grigor Taylor (born 1943), Australian film actor also known as Greg Taylor
