= Gregory Little =

Gregory Little or Greg Little may refer to:

- Greg Little (wide receiver) (born 1989), American football wide receiver
- Greg Little (offensive lineman) (born 1997), American football player
- Greg Little (footballer), New Zealand association football player
