= Greg Shaw =

Greg Shaw may refer to:

- Greg Shaw (writer) (1949–2004), American writer, publisher, magazine editor, music historian and record executive
- Greg Shaw (judge) (born 1957), justice of the Alabama Supreme Court
- Greg Shaw (footballer) (born 1970), Scottish footballer
- Greg Shaw (sledge hockey) (born 1990), American ice sledge hockey player
