= Greg Wells (footballer, born 1952) =

Australian rules footballer (born 1952)

Personal information
- Full name: Gregory Wells (willy)
- Born: 12 August 1951 (age 75)
- Original team: Geelong Amateurs

Playing career^{1}
Years	Club	Games (Goals)
1972 — 1973	Geelong	4 (1)
- ^{1} Playing statistics correct to the end of 1973.

Gregory Wells (born 12 August 1951) is a former Australian rules footballer who played for Geelong in the Victorian Football League (now known as the Australian Football League).
