= Gregory Wilson =

Gregory Wilson may refer to:

- Greg Wilson (gridiron football) (born 1990), American football wide receiver
- Greg Wilson (DJ) (born 1960), British DJ
- Greg Wilson (soccer) (born c. 1971/1972), American soccer head coach and former player
- Gregory Wilson (Australian cricketer) (born 1958), Australian cricket player
- Greg Wilson (Saint Lucian cricketer) (born 1972), Saint Lucian cricketer
- Gregory Wilson (magician) (born 1961), American magician
- The Greg Wilson, American comedian and actor
- Greg Wilson (bowls) (born 1982), Canadian lawn bowls player
- Greg Wilson (curler) (born 1966), American curler
