= Greg Fox =

Greg Fox may refer to:

- Greg Fox (ice hockey) (born 1953), retired Canadian ice hockey defenceman
- Greg Fox (cartoonist) (born 1961), American creator of Kyle's Bed & Breakfast
- Greg Fox, drummer for Liturgy
