= Greg Gershuny =

Greg Gershuny is the Executive Director of the Aspen Institute's Energy and Environment Program, and has also served as Managing Director and James E. Rogers Energy Policy Fellow for the program. Prior to joining The Aspen Institute, Gershuny was the Associate Director and Chief of Staff of the U.S. Department of Energy's Office of Energy Policy and Systems Analysis as of July 2015. Prior to that, he was the Director of Energy and Environment at the White House Office of Presidential Personnel, the Confidential Assistant to Carl Wieman at the White House Office of Science and Technology Policy, an Associate at the White House National Economic Council and a Field Organizer on the 2008 Barack Obama Campaign for Change in Hammond, Indiana.

Gershuny graduated from George Mason University with a bachelor's degree in Political Conflict History. He was born in New Jersey.
