= Greg Richards =

Greg Richards may refer to:

- Greg Richards (decathlete) (born 1956), English decathlete
- Greg Richards (rugby league) (born 1995), English rugby league footballer
