= Greg Gary =

Greg Gary may refer to:

- Greg Gary (basketball) (born 1970), American college basketball coach
- Greg Gary (Canadian football) (born 1958), former gridiron football linebacker and current coach
