= Gregory Norton =

Gregory Norton may refer to:

- Sir Gregory Norton, 1st Baronet (1603–1652), Member of Parliament
- Greg Norton (born 1959), American bassist
- Greg Norton (baseball) (born 1972), former Major League Baseball player

== See also ==
- Greg Morton (born 1953), former American football player
