= Greg Young (planner) =

Australian planning academic

Greg Young is an Australian academic, urban planner, and historian. He is an adjunct professor in the School of the Built Environment at the University of Technology Sydney. Young is the author of books including Reshaping Planning With Culture (2016) and Paddington: A History (2019). He was formerly a research fellow at Macquarie University.

== Life and career ==
From the 1980s, Greg Young contributed to a number of pioneering Australian cultural strategies, including the NSW government's system of heritage studies, the NSW Cultural Tourism Strategy (1991); Australia's first national cultural policy, Creative Nation; and the Australian government's model for cultural mapping published as Mapping Culture – A Guide for Cultural and Economic Development in Communities.

As an academic from the 2000s, Young developed and published new models for the social integration and utilisation of culture in inter-sectoral planning, building on culture's capacity to refer to itself. These ideas was first published in 'The Culturisation of Planning' in Planning Theory in 2008 and then illustrated with global case studies in Reshaping Planning with Culture, Routledge (2016). This was followed by a concept of culturised governance, outlined in chapters in 'The Routledge Research Companion to Planning and Culture' (2016), for which Young was principal editor.

He was born in Hobart, Tasmania and gained a BA (Hons) from the University of Tasmania, an MA from the University of Sydney, and a PhD from the University of New South Wales; he also holds a Diploma of Urban Studies from Macquarie University, Sydney.

== Selected publications ==
Books

- Young, G. ed. 2019. Paddington: A History. Sydney: NewSouth Books.
- Young, G. and Stevenson, D. eds. 2016. The Routledge Research Companion to Planning and Culture. Abingdon, Oxford: Routledge.
- Young, G. 2016. Reshaping Planning with Culture. Abingdon, Oxford: Routledge.
- Young, G., Clark, I. and Sutherland, J. 1995. Mapping Culture – A Guide for Cultural and Economic Development in Communities. Canberra: AGPS.
- Young, G. 1991. The NSW Cultural Tourism Strategy. Sydney: NSW Tourism Commission.
- Young, G. 1984. Conservation, History and Development. Sydney: NSW GIS.
- Young, G. 1984. Environmental Conservation – Towards a Philosophy. Sydney: NSW Heritage Council.

Book chapters and articles

- Young, G. 2008. ‘The Culturisation of Planning’, Planning Theory, 7(1), 71–91.
- Young, G. 2006 ‘Speak Culture! Culture in Planning’s Past, Present and Future’, in M. Guardia, and J. Monclus, (eds) Culture, Urbanism and Planning, Ashgate: London.
- Young, G. 2000. ‘Behind the Venetians’, Australian Planner, 37, 1.
- Young G. 1994. ‘Isle of Gothic Silence’, Island Magazine, Issue 60–61, Spring/Summer, 31–35.
- Young. G. 1991. ‘Authenticity in Cultural Conservation’, Australian Planner, 29, 1.
