= Greg Johnston =

Greg Johnston may refer to:

- Greg Johnston (baseball) (born 1955), American baseball player
- Greg Johnston (rower) (born 1959), New Zealand rower
- Greg Johnston (ice hockey) (born 1965), Canadian ice hockey player

== See also ==
- Greg Johnson (disambiguation)
