= Greg Garcia (government official) =

Greg Garcia is a cyber security professional and former Assistant Secretary in the U.S. Department of Homeland Security.

In 2006 U.S. President George W. Bush appointed Garcia as the nation's first Assistant Secretary for Cyber Security and Telecommunications for the United States Department of Homeland Security. As assistant secretary, Garcia led the National Cyber Security Division, the National Communications System and the Office of Emergency Communications. According to Federal Computer Week, many experts believed Garcia "successfully championed cybersecurity in his first year, boosting its relevance in the DHS hierarchy and government", however, some critics were concerned cybersecurity efforts weren't substantive enough.

After leaving the government, Garcia was employed as a cybersecurity and identity management partnership executive for Bank of America.

As of 2017, Garcia was executive vice-president at Signal Group, a public affairs consultancy. He has also been employed as director of global government relations at 3Com.
