= Greg Miller =

Greg Miller or Gregory Miller may refer to:

- Greg Miller (animator) (born 1976), American animator
- Greg Miller (Australian footballer) (born 1953), Australian rules footballer
- Greg Miller (baseball), American baseball player
- Gregory Miller (cricketer) (born 1973), South African cricketer
- Greg Miller (footballer, born 1976), Scottish footballer
- Greg Miller (host) (born 1983), American media personality
- Greg Miller (photographer) (born 1967), American photographer
- Greg Miller (poet) (born 1957), American poet
- Gregory A. Miller (born 1962), American politician
