= Greg Hall =

Greg Hall may refer to:

- Greg Hall (politician) (born 1948), Australian politician and independent member of the Tasmanian Legislative Council
- Greg Hall (filmmaker) (born 1980), English film director, producer, cinematographer and screenwriter
- Greg Hall (poet) (1946–2009), American poet
- Greg Hall (jockey), retired Australian jockey
- Greg Hall, former drummer for the band Sacred Reich (from 1985–2000, 2006–2018)
