= Mike Lynch (cartoonist) =

American cartoonist

- Born: January 18, 1962 (age 64) Iowa City, California, U.S.
- Area: Cartoonist

Mike Lynch is a cartoonist whose work can be seen in Reader's Digest, The Wall Street Journal, Playboy and other mass media markets.

== Career ==
Mike Lynch illustrated the book Classical Music for Beginners, and drew the cover for Chamber Music Magazine. He spent five years working as a graphic artist for companies like Goldman Sachs and Deloitte & Touche.

== Clients ==
His cartoons have appeared in Barron's, Harvard Business Review, The New York Daily News, Prospect, Punch, The Spectator, The Funny Times, First for Women, Chronicle of Higher Education and Brandweek.

== Societies ==
He is the National Representative for the National Cartoonists Society, and Chair of the National Cartoonists Society Long Island Chapter aka the "Berndt Toast Gang". He is also a member of the Freelancers Union.
