= Greg Thompson (Canadian football) =

Canadian football player (born c. 1948)

Profile
- Positions: Fullback, Running back

Personal information
- Born: c. 1948 (age 77–78)
- Listed height: 5 ft 10 in (1.78 m)
- Listed weight: 200 lb (91 kg)

Career history
- 1969–1971: Ottawa Rough Riders
- 1971: Edmonton Eskimos

Awards and highlights
- Grey Cup champion (1969)

Greg Thompson (born c. 1948) was a Canadian professional football player who played for the Ottawa Rough Riders and Edmonton Eskimos. He won the Grey Cup with Ottawa in 1969. He previously played junior football with the Ottawa Sooners.
