= Greg Jones =

Greg(ory) Jones may refer to:

== Sports ==
=== American football ===
- Greg Jones (running back, born 1948), former NFL running back
- Greg Jones (fullback) (born 1981), NFL fullback
- Greg Jones (linebacker, born 1974), former NFL linebacker
- Greg Jones (linebacker, born 1988), NFL linebacker

=== Other sports ===
- Greg Jones (Australian footballer) (born 1970), Australian rules footballer for St Kilda and Swan Districts
- Greg Jones (baseball, born 1998), American baseball player
- Greg Jones (basketball) (born 1961), basketball player
- Gregory Jones (cricketer) (born 1956), New Zealand cricketer
- Greg Jones (pitcher) (born 1976), Major League Baseball pitcher
- Greg Jones (skier) (born 1953), American former alpine skier
- Greg Jones (tennis) (born 1989), Australian tennis player
- Greg Jones (wrestler) (born 1982), American collegiate wrestler
- Greg Jones (rugby union) (born 1996), Irish rugby player

== Others ==
- Gregory P. Jones (born 1968), King's Counsel and Aldermanic Sheriff of the City of London
- L. Gregory Jones (born 1960), theologian
- Gregory V. Jones (born 1959), wine climatologist

== See also ==
- Gregory Malek-Jones (born 1990), American singer, dancer and actor
