= Greg Page =

Greg or Gregory Page may refer to:

- Greg Page (boxer) (1958–2009), American boxer
- Greg Page (musician) (born 1972), Australian musician, formerly with The Wiggles
- Sir Gregory Page, 1st Baronet (c. 1669–1720), British politician and merchant
- Sir Gregory Page, 2nd Baronet (c. 1695–1775), British art collector
- Gregory R. Page (born 1951), American businessman
- Gregory Page (musician) (born 1963), American-Irish songwriter, singer and record producer
