= Greg Bell =

Greg Bell or Gregory Bell may refer to:

- Greg Bell (long jumper) (1930–2025), American track and field Olympic athlete
- Greg Bell (running back, born 1962), American football running back
- Greg Bell (running back, born 1998), American football running back
- Greg Bell (politician) (born 1948), American politician; Lieutenant Governor of Utah
- Greg Bell (Australian footballer) (born 1955), Australian rules footballer
