= Greg Olsen =

Greg Olsen may refer to:

- Greg Olsen (American football) (born 1985), American football sportscaster and former tight end
- Gregory Olsen (born 1945), American entrepreneur, engineer, scientist and space tourist

== See also ==
- Gregg Olsen (born 1959), American crime author
- Greg Olson (disambiguation)
