= Greg Thomson (ice hockey) =

Canadian-born German ice hockey player and coach

- Born: May 28, 1963 (age 62) Edmonton, Alberta, Canada
- Height: 6 ft 1 in (185 cm)
- Weight: 196 lb (89 kg; 14 st 0 lb)
- Position: Forward/Defence
- Shot: Left
- Played for: EC Hannover; Krefelder FV; Frankfurt Lions; Hamburg Crocodiles
- National team: Germany
- Playing career: 1985–1999

Greg Thomson (born May 28, 1963) is a Canadian born-German ice hockey coach and a former professional player.

Thomson has dual citizenship in Canada and Germany, where he spent most of his professional playing career.

== Playing career ==
Thomson was born in Edmonton, Alberta. After playing in the Saskatchewan Junior Hockey League (SJHL)and Western Hockey League (WHL) until 1984, Thomson signed his first professional contract in Germany prior to the 1985-86 campaign. He would stay until 1992 with EC Hannover and move up with the team from the third to the second German division in 1988.

In 1992, Thomson was picked up by Krefelder EV of the German top-flight. Three years later, he transferred to fellow DEL side Frankfurt Lions and in 1997 joined second-division team Hamburg Crocodiles, where he finished his playing career in 1999.

== National team ==
Born in Canada, Thomson was granted German citizenship while he was playing professionally in the country and became eligible to represent the German National Team. In 1993, he was named to the German roster for the World Championships.

== Coaching career ==
He embarked on his coaching career in July 2002 and would serve as head coach and general manager of the Hannover Indians until November 2007.

Thomson then joined the coaching staff of Deutsche Eishockey Liga (DEL) side ERC Ingolstadt, serving as assistant coach between December 2007 and December 2008, before taking over as head coach midway through the 2008-09 campaign to replace Benoit Laporte for the remainder of the season. After assisting on the Adler Mannheim coaching staff during the DEL playoffs, he returned to his previous job as Ingolstadt assistant coach for the 2009-10 season and again was promoted to the head coach position after the sacking of Bob Manno in February 2010. In October 2010, Thomson was relieved of his duties as Ingolstadt head coach.

He then was added to the coaching staff of fellow DEL team Augsburger Panther for the 2012-13 season: After two and a half years in the assistant coach role, he took over as head coach in December 2014 after Larry Mitchell had been sacked. Thomson remained in the job until the end of the 2014-15 season.

Thomson served as assistant coach of Japan's U20 National Team at the 2011 IIHF Ice Hockey U20 World Championship (Division I Group A) and joined the staff of Japan's Men's National Team for the 2015 IIHF Ice Hockey World Championship (Division I Group A), also as an assistant. In August 2015, he was appointed head coach of Japan's Men's National Team.

On December 23, 2016, Thomson was named assistant coach of German DEL side Kölner Haie. He held this job until 2021. In August 2022, Thompson returned to the Hannover Indians where he was appointed as Youth Hockey Coordinator.
