= Robert J. Cerfolio =

Robert James Cerfolio
- Born: May 24, 1962 (age 64); Paterson, New Jersey, U.S.
- Education: University of Rochester (BA, MD)
- Known for: Robotic thoracic surgery; Efficiency Quality Index

Robert James Cerfolio (born May 24, 1962) is an American thoracic surgeon and medical educator who is chief of clinical thoracic surgery and director of quality for cardiothoracic care at NYU Langone Health in New York City. Previously, he served as Professor of Surgery and Chief of the Section of Thoracic Surgery at the University of Alabama at Birmingham.

Cerfolio is known for developing the Efficiency Quality Index, a physician-derived metric that combines outcomes, cost and resource use.

== Early life and education ==
Cerfolio was born in Paterson, New Jersey, the third of four children of urologist Robert D. Cerfolio and registered nurse LaVerne E. Cerfolio. While at the University of Rochester he captained the baseball team and in 1985 became the institution's first Academic All American in the sport. He earned a Bachelor of Arts magna cum laude from Rochester in 1984 and entered its Early Selection medical track, receiving his Doctor of Medicine in 1988. His postgraduate training comprised general surgery at Saint Francis Hospital & Medical Center, urology at Weill Cornell Medicine and Memorial Sloan Kettering Cancer Center, followed by general and cardiothoracic residencies and a fellowship at the Mayo Clinic, which he completed in 1996.

== Career ==
Cerfolio joined the University of Alabama at Birmingham School of Medicine in 1996 as assistant professor of surgery and became chief of its Section of Thoracic Surgery in 2000, holding the James H. Estes Family Endowed Chair for Lung Cancer Research. Later, he introduced robotic techniques to lobectomy, oesophagectomy and complex airway reconstruction at UAB.

In 2017, he joined NYU Langone Health as chief of clinical thoracic surgery, where he later served as senior vice president, vice dean and chief of hospital operations from 2018 and system director of quality outcomes from 2022.

== Research ==
Cerfolio's scholarship addresses minimally invasive thoracic oncology, the management of postoperative air leaks and health system performance analytics. A 2005 review in Current Opinion in Pulmonary Medicine set out the first evidence-based classification of postoperative air leaks and recommended water-seal drainage over wall suction.

== Recognition ==
Cerfolio has served as president of the Southern Thoracic Surgical Association and is a member of the American Surgical Association.The University of Rochester honoured him with its Distinguished Alumnus Award and students at UAB twice voted him recipient of the Argus Teaching Award.
