= Gregory M. Howard =

Gregory M. Howard is the senior pastor of First Baptist Church East End in Newport News, Virginia. He has also served as pastor of Union Branch Baptist Church in Chesterfield, Virginia and Jerusalem Baptist Church in Sparta, Virginia.

== Career ==
Howard is the interim dean and associate professor of homiletics and practical theology at the Samuel DeWitt Proctor School of Theology at Virginia Union University in Richmond, Virginia. He is also the president of the Baptist General Convention of Virginia.

Howard is a member of Alpha Phi Alpha fraternity, a former board member of the Children's Home of Virginia Baptists, and the former president of the alumni chapter of the Samuel DeWitt Proctor School of Theology.

== Education ==
- Bachelor of Science in Organizational Management and Development – Bluefield College
- Master of Divinity – Samuel DeWitt Proctor School of Theology at Virginia Union University
- Doctor of Ministry in Homiletics – Aquinas Institute of Theology – St. Louis University
- Additional studies – Joe R. Engle Institute of Preaching at Princeton Theological Seminary

== Publications ==
Howard is the author of Black Sacred Rhetoric: The Gospel According to Religious Folk Talk.

The late Katie Geneva Cannon, former Annie Scales Rogers Professor for Christian Ethics at Union Theological Seminary and Presbyterian School of Christian Education, stated:

This commentary is much-needed both in the church and in terms of the ongoing rhetorical conversations taking place in the theological academy. Howard is entirely at ease with the basic principles and assumptions that drive Black Preaching.

The late Wyatt Tee Walker, former chief of staff for Martin Luther King Jr., stated:

In this post-modern age, these expressions are an important bridge from the Old Time Religion age to the Hip Hop era which has a deep chasm.

Rev. Angelo V. Chatmon, director of church relations at Virginia Union University, states:

Howard presents the linguistic expressions which have emerged out of "Black Preaching" as a theologically credible and contributing partner in the language of preaching.

Howard is also the editor and a contributing author of Voices Crying Out in the Wilderness: Theological Reflections Where Context Matters.

== Early life ==
Howard is a native of Lancaster, Virginia.
