= Greg Edwards =

Greg Edwards may refer to:

- Greg Edwards (musician), American musician and songwriter
- Greg Edwards (DJ) (born 1947), American-born British disc jockey
- Greg Edwards, presenter of Thug Notes in the persona of "Sparky Sweets, PhD"

== See also ==
- Gregory James Edwards, American minister
