= Greg Orton =

Greg Orton may refer to:

- Greg Orton (wide receiver), wide receiver
- Greg Orton (offensive lineman), offensive lineman
