= Greg King =

Greg King may refer to:

- Greg King (writer) (born 1961), American journalist and conservationist
- Greg King (author) (born 1964), American author
- Greg King (lawyer) (1969–2012), New Zealand lawyer
- Greg King (rugby union) (born 1988), English rugby union player
- Greg King (cricketer) (born 1973), South African cricketer and current fitness coach to the national team
- Gregory King (1648–1712), English genealogist, engraver and statistician
- Gregory King (sound designer) (born 1966), Canadian sound designer for film and television
