= Greg Abbott (disambiguation) =

Greg Abbott (born 1957) is the 48th governor of Texas.

Greg or Gregory Abbott may also refer to:

- Greg Abbott (footballer) (born 1963), English football manager and former player
- Reverend Gadget or Greg Abbott, American television personality
- Gregory Abbott (born 1954), American soul musician, singer, composer and producer
- Gregory Abbott (1900–1981), announcer for Paramount News
