= Esther Kerr Rusthoi =

American hymnwriter (1909–1962)

Esther Kerr Rusthoi

Esther Kerr Rusthoi (February 21, 1909 – April 8, 1962) was an American author, poet, composer, singer, and evangelist, and was an associate pastor at the Angelus Temple of Los Angeles. She is best known for her hymn, "It Will be Worth it All, When We See Jesus." Her husband was Rev. Howard Rusthoi who also served as overseas chaplain in the U.S. armed forces. Together they were known as "revival broadcasters". She was sister to evangelist Phil Kerr.

In addition to gospel songs, her other works include:

- "Don't Give Up the Ship" (Glendale, California: The Church Press, 193?)
- "Listen for the Whispers"
- "Amazing Grace: Overwhelming Unmerited Divine Favor" (Glendale, California: The Church Press, 193?)
- "Why Pray? A Challenging Call to Prayer!" (The Church Press, 194?)
- "Listen for the Whispers!" (Glendale, California: The Church Press, circa 1952)
