= Gregory Walker =

Gregory or Greg Walker may refer to:

- Greg Walker (academic), professor of rhetoric and English literature at the University of Edinburgh
- Greg Walker (baseball) (born 1959), former first baseman
- Greg Walker (footballer) (born 1967), former Australian rules footballer
- Greg Walker (American football) (born 1981), American football player
- Greg Walker (rower) (born 1964), American Olympic rower
- Gregory T.S. Walker (born 1961), American composer, violinist, and guitarist
- Gregory Walker (music), harmonic formula in the Renaissance period
- Greg Walker (politician) (born 1963), Republican politician in Indiana
- Greg T. Walker (born 1951), American bassist
- Gregory Walker, a character in "A Piano in the House"
