= Gregory Johnson =

Gregory, Greg or Gregg Johnson may refer to:

== Entertainment ==
- Greg Johnson (comedian), American stand-up comedian, actor, and television host
- Gregory B. Johnson (born 1951), pianist and member of the band Cameo
- Greg Johnson (game designer) (born 1960), of video games Starflight and ToeJam & Earl
- Greg Johnson (musician) (born 1968), New Zealand-born singer and songwriter

== Sports ==
- Greg Johnson (American football coach) (born c. 1960), Prairie View A&M
- Greg Johnson (defensive lineman) (born 1953)
- Greg Johnson (offensive lineman)
- Greg Johnson (curler) (born 1975), American curler
- Greg Johnson (ice hockey) (1971–2019), National Hockey League forward
- Gregg Johnson (born 1982), former professional ice hockey player in the East Coast Hockey League
- Greg Johnson (rugby league) (born 1990), professional rugby player
- Greg Johnson (javelin thrower) (born c. 1972), American javelin thrower, winner of the 1995 NCAA DI javelin championship
- Greg Johnson (long jumper) (born 1950), American long jumper, 1970 and 1971 All-American for the Wisconsin Badgers track and field team

== Other ==
- Greg Johnson (businessman) (born 1960s), CEO of Franklin Templeton Investments
- Greg Johnson (pastor), American Presbyterian minister
- Greg Johnson (white nationalist) (born 1971), American white nationalist
- Gregory G. Johnson (born 1946), US Navy admiral
- Gregory C. Johnson (born 1954), astronaut
- Gregory H. Johnson (born 1962), astronaut
- Gregory Lee Johnson (born 1956), defendant in the landmark Supreme Court case Texas v. Johnson
- Gregg Johnson (politician), Illinois state legislator

== See also ==
- Greg Johnston (disambiguation)
