= Gregory Lee =

Gregory, Greg or Gregg Lee may refer to:

== People ==
=== Sport ===
- Greg Lee (basketball) (1951–2022), American basketball and volleyball player
- Greg Lee (defensive back) (born 1965), American football player
- Greg Lee (wide receiver) (born 1984), American football player

=== Other people ===
- Greg Lee (actor) (born 1962), American actor
- Gregory B. Lee (born 1955), academic, author, and broadcaster
- Greg Lee, president of Nokia Technologies
- Greg Lee, director of SEO DRUM Agency

== Fictional characters ==
- Gregg Lee, a character in video game Night in the Woods

== See also ==
- Greg Leigh (born 1994), Jamaican-British footballer
- Craig Lee (born 1977), Scottish golfer
- Lee Gregory (disambiguation)
