= Greg Lewis =

Greg Lewis may refer to:

- Greg Lewis (sprinter) (born 1946), Australian athlete
- Greg Lewis (basketball) (born 1978), American professional basketball player
- Greg Lewis (running back) (born 1969), American football player
- Greg Lewis (wide receiver) (born 1980), American football wide receiver
- Greg Lewis (politician) (1953–2020), member of the Kansas House of Representatives
- Greg Lewis (sportscaster) (born 1947), American sportscaster
- Greg Lewis (1935–2023), American actor, musician and comedian
