= Greg Roberts =

Greg Roberts may refer to:

- Gregory David Roberts (born 1952), Australian author
- Greg Roberts (American football) (born 1956), American football player
- Greg Roberts (designer) (born 1969), American artist and entrepreneur
- Greg Roberts (musician) (born 1958), former drummer for Big Audio Dynamite
