= Greg James (disambiguation) =

Greg James (born 1985) is a British DJ and broadcaster.

Greg James may also refer to:

- Greg James (radio show), the radio show hosted by the DJ
- Greg James (judge) (born 1944), Australian judge
- Greg James (tattoo artist) (1954–2026), American tattoo artist
