= Greg Lambert =

Greg Lambert may refer to:

- Greg Lambert (footballer) (born 1947), former Australian rules footballer
- Greg Lambert (cricketer) (born 1980), English cricketer
