= Greg Gagne =

Greg Gagne is the name of:

- Greg Gagne (baseball) (born 1961), former shortstop in Major League Baseball
- Greg Gagne (wrestler) (born 1948), former professional wrestler and son of Verne Gagne
