= Greg Ball =

Greg Ball may refer to:

- Greg Ball (politician) (born 1977), New York state senator
- Greg Ball (cyclist) (born 1974), Australian Paralympic cyclist
- Gregory F. Ball, American psychologist

== See also ==
- Ball (surname)
