= Greg Hill (author) =

American musician, illustrator, and author

Greg Hill (Gregory Walter Hill and Soapy Argyle) is an American musician, illustrator and author. He is best known for his novel, East of Denver.

== Personal ==
Hill was raised in eastern Colorado. He lives and works in Joes, Colorado.

== Writing ==
Gregory Hill is the author of four novels. These include The Strattford County Trilogy--East of Denver (2012), The Lonesome Trials of Johnny Riles (2015) and Zebra Skin Shirt (2018)--as well as the forthcoming Sister Liberty (2023), which will be the first novel of the epochal Stables Family Series.

In 2013, Hill received the Colorado Book Award for East of Denver. which was published in 2012. He also produces graphics art work on concert promotional posters and CD inserts. His novel, The Lonesome Trials of Johnny Riles, won the Leapfrog Press Global Fiction Prize Contest in 2014. It was published in 2015.

Since 2016, Hill has contributed opinion columns to his local newspaper, The Yuma Pioneer, as well as the Colorado Times Recorder.

== Music career ==
Hill has recorded several solo albums and performed in bands including The Shivers, Mr. Tree and the Wingnuts, Marty Jones and the Pork Boilin' Po' Boys, The Orangu-Tones, Six Months to Live, The Super Phoenixes and the Babysitters. Hill plays guitar, saxophone, piano, sitar, banjo, vocals, harmonica and bass guitar.

Since 1999, Hill's record label, Sparky the Dog, has recorded over 50 albums, including releases by the Anti-Westerns, Plates of Cake, the New England Axe Factory and the North Cascades.

== Awards ==
- 2014 Leapfrog Press Global Fiction Prize Contest for The Lonesome Trials of Johnny Riles.
- 2013 Colorado Book Award For Literary Fiction
- Boulder County Artist in Residence - 2012
