= Greg Holmes =

Greg Holmes may refer to:

- Greg Holmes (cricketer) (born 1993), Welsh cricketer
- Greg Holmes (rugby union) (born 1983), Australian rugby union footballer
- Greg Holmes (tennis) (born 1963), American tennis player
