= Gregg Lake =

- Location within Alberta
- Location: Alberta, Canada
- Coordinates: 53.5461112°N 117.7952778°W
- Type: Lake

Gregg Lake is a lake in Alberta, Canada. It is named after J. J. Gregg, a pioneer citizen.

== See also ==
- List of lakes of Alberta
