= Greg Warren =

Greg Warren may refer to:

- Greg Warren (American football) (born 1981), NFL player
- Greg Warren (politician), Australian politician
