= Greg Brooker =

Greg Brooker may refer to:

- Greg Brooker (screenwriter), American screenwriter
- Greg Brooker (music producer) (born 1981), British music producer
