= Greg Jackson =

Greg or Gregory Jackson may refer to:

- G. G. Jackson (born 2004), American professional basketball player
- Greg Jackson (American football) (born 1966), American football player
- Greg Jackson (basketball, born 1952) (1952–2012), NBA player
- Greg Jackson (basketball, born 1959), college basketball head coach
- Greg Jackson (businessman), British businessman and entrepreneur, CEO and founder of Octopus Energy Group
- Greg Jackson (MMA trainer) (born 1974), American mixed martial arts coach, founder of Jackson's Submission Fighting
- Greg Jackson (rugby union) (born 1996), South African rugby union player
- Greg Jackson (writer) (born 1983), American author of novels and essays
- Gregory Jackson (entertainer) (born 1985), American YouTube personality
- Gregory Jackson (singer/songwriter) (born 1955), American funk musician, songwriter and record producer
