= Gregory Wilkins =

Gregory or Greg Wilkins may refer to:

- Gregory Charles Wilkins (1956–2009), Canadian businessman and chartered accountant
- Greg Wilkins, Canadian endurance motorsports driver; e.g. 2008 24 Hours of Daytona
- Greg Wilkins, American college football player; see USA Today All-USA high school football team
- Greg Wilkins, a character from the comic strip Curtis
