= Gregory Kane =

Gregory Kane or Greg Kane may refer to:

- Greg Kane (musician) (born 1966), Scottish musician
- Gregory Kane (journalist) (c. 1951–2014), American journalist
- Greg Kane (rugby union) (born 1952), New Zealand rugby union player
