= Greg Peterson =

Greg Peterson may refer to:

- Greg Peterson (American football) (born 1984), American football defensive end
- Greg Peterson (Canadian football) (born 1960), football player in the CFL
- Greg Peterson (rugby union) (born 1991), American rugby union footballer
- Greg Peterson "Machinery Pete", American TV host and podcaster

== See also ==
- Greg Peters (disambiguation)
- Greg Petersen, American soccer coach
