= Greg Olson =

Greg Olson may refer to:

- Greg Olson (baseball) (born 1960), American former baseball catcher
- Greg Olson (American football) (born 1963), American football coach

== See also ==
- Gregg Olson (born 1966), American baseball pitcher
- Greg Olsen (disambiguation)
