= Greg Stewart =

Greg or Gregory Stewart may refer to:

- Greg Stewart (athlete) (born 1986), Canadian Paralympic athlete
- Greg Stewart (footballer) (born 1990), Scottish footballer
- Greg Stewart (ice hockey) (born 1986), professional ice hockey winger
- Greg Stewart (triathlete), Australian triathlon and duathlon athlete

== See also ==
- W. Gregory Stewart, poet
