= Greg Garrett =

Greg Garrett may refer to:

- Greg Garrett (baseball) (1947–2003), American baseball pitcher
- Greg Garrett (writer) (born 1961), American writer and professor
