= Greg Harris =

Greg, Gregg, or Gregory Harris may refer to:

- Greg Harris (politician) (born 1955), American politician in Illinois
- Greg A. Harris (born 1955), American former major-league pitcher, 1981–1995 (Mets, Reds, Expos, Padres, Rangers, Phillies, Red Sox, Yankees, Expos)
- Greg S. Harris (born 1965), American museum executive, president of the Rock and Roll Hall of Fame
- Greg W. Harris (born 1963), American former major-league pitcher, 1988–1995 (Padres, Rockies, Twins)
- Gregg Harris (born 1952), American educator and major figure in the Christian homeschooling movement
- Gregory N. Harris (born 1965), United States Navy admiral (retired)
- Gregory K. Harris (born 1948), United States Attorney in Illinois
