= Greg Myers =

Greg Myers may refer to:

- Greg Myers (linguist)
- Greg Myers (baseball) (born 1966), American former Major League Baseball player
- Greg Myers (American football) (born 1972), American former National Football League player
