= Greg Collins =

Greg Collins may refer to:

- Greg Collins (American football) (born 1952), American actor and former NFL player
- Greg Collins, drummer with Radio 4 (band)
- Greg Collins, fictional private detective featured in the radio program It's a Crime, Mr. Collins
- Greg Collins (record producer), musician & record producer
