= Greg Kennedy =

Greg Kennedy may refer to:

- Greg Kennedy (footballer) (born 1949), Australian rules footballer
- Greg Kennedy (hurler) (born 1976), Irish hurler
- Greg Kennedy (historian), Canadian military historian and author
