= Greg Wood (magician) =

Greg Wood is a magician, speaker, and comedian who has performed throughout Canada and the United States. He has also performed in Sri Lanka. England, Hong Kong, India, Fiji, Belize, Brazil, and Mexico. Wood has also lectured and shared his effects with other magicians in England, The United States Canada, Fiji, and India.

Wood started in theatre in his teens and worked with:

- Manitoba School for Theatre and Allied Arts
- Manitoba Summer Theatre Workshops
- Circle of Dionysus Theatre Company
- Transcona Amateur Theatre Association

He left performing to attend post secondary education and to become a professional Land Surveyor. He ran a successful Land Surveying and Consulting Business for over 20 years. Wood returned to the performing arts in the early 1990s as he started to perform magic and illusions, and left his business to become a full-time entertainer.

Wood has had some of his original tricks published for other magicians, has appeared on TV a number of times including CBC’s "On The Road", Global’s "It’s a New Day", CityTV’s "Breakfast Television" and CTV's "The Amazing Race Canada".

He has also appeared on the cover of "Seeing Truth" an international magic magazine. Wood is also a featured magician in the magic documentary "Pick A Card"

Over the last twenty-five years he and his wife Oonaugh have entertained hundreds of thousands with their comedy and magic at festivals, schools, churches, and corporate events. Wood is a three-time winner of Winnipeg’s "Best of Variety Act" and has twice won Manitoba’s "Close Up Conjuror’s" award.

Wood also uses his magic as a professional speaker and used it recently to earn the "Accredited Speakers" designation and was inducted into the Toastmasters Hall of Fame in 2018. The Accredited Speaker designation is the prestigious designation recognizing professional-level public speaking skills offered by Toastmasters International. It recognizes speakers who combine expert knowledge in a particular subject with mastery of the spoken wordmaking them sought-after experts in their respective fields. He is the 77th speaker to ever win this award since it started in 1981.
