= Greg Craven =

Greg Craven may refer to:

- Greg Craven (academic) (born 1958), Professor of Law and vice-chancellor at the Australian Catholic University
- Greg Craven (teacher), American high school science teacher and climate change author
