= Greg Morris (disambiguation) =

Greg Morris (1933–1996) was an American actor.

Greg Morris may also refer to:

- Greg Morris (organist) (born 1976), English organist
- Greg Morris (Canadian football) (born 1992), Canadian football player
- Greg Morris (politician) (born 1964), American state legislator

== See also ==
- Craig Morris (born 1968), American classical trumpeter
