= Norman Hutchins =

American musician (1962–2025)

- Born: September 27, 1962; Delaware, U.S.
- Origin: Dover, Delaware, U.S.
- Died: June 5, 2025 (aged 62) Carson, California, U.S.
- Genres: Gospel; traditional black gospel; urban contemporary gospel; southern gospel
- Occupation: Musician
- Instruments: Vocals; guitar
- Years active: 1975–2015
- Labels: Sparrow; JDI; IR
- Website: normanhutchins.com

Norman Earl Hutchins (September 27, 1962 – June 5, 2025) was an American gospel musician. He started his solo music career in 1992 with the release of Norman Hutchins on Sparrow Records, and released ten albums (on Sparrow Records, JDI Records, and IR Records) over the course of 21 years, seven of which reached Billboard magazine's Gospel Albums chart.

== Early life ==
Norman Hutchins was born September 27, 1962, in Delaware, as Norman Earil Hutchins. He started preaching at the age of 8, and was ordained at the age of 12 by Bishop Foreman of Laurel, Delaware. Preaching earned him $100 per evening, which allowed him to support his mother and his ten siblings.

He met with his wife, at the age of 19, to Delaware, Pennsylvania, and became the preacher of Hope Church of God in Christ (COGIC). He later settled in Los Angeles, and worked in menial jobs there until he believed God was leading him to West Angeles COGIC to be their music minister. Later on he felt called to move back to Delaware, where he started Frontline Ministries. He held a master's degree in biblical counseling and a doctorate in church administration.

== Music career ==
Hutchins's music career started in 1992, with the release of Norman Hutchins by Sparrow Records; he also released Don't Stop Praying in 1993. Both of those albums failed to chart, and were his only releases with the label.

He obtained success when he joined JDI Records in 1999 and released his third album, Nobody But You, his Billboard magazine chart debut release on the Gospel Albums chart.

His next two JDI albums, Battlefield in 1999 and Emmanuel in 2001, also saw chart success, but his 2002 Battlefield: The Sermon failed to chart.

He then signed with IR Records, which released Spontaneous Praise, Vol. 1 in 2008, God Is Faithful in 2009, If You Didn't Know... Now You Know in 2011, and 2013's Hosanna, which all charted on the Gospel Albums chart. He received eight Dove Award nominations and eight Stellar Award nominations, along with Grammy Awards nominations.

== Personal life and death ==
Hutchins married his first wife Michelle at the age of 19. They had three children.

Years after their divorce, he married his second wife, Karen. Together they started Frontline Ministries in Dover, Delaware.

He battled diabetes, which caused him to lose some of his vision and go temporarily blind. This also caused his kidneys to fail; his wife was a match and she donated one of her kidneys to him.

Hutchins died at his home in Carson, California, on June 5, 2025, at the age of 62.

== Discography ==
List of studio albums, with selected chart positions
Title	Album details	Peak chart positions
Title	Album details	US Gos
Norman Hutchins	Released: 1992; Label: Sparrow; CD, digital download	–
Don't Stop Praying	Released: 1993; Label: Sparrow; CD, digital download	–
Nobody But You	Released: 1999; Label: JDI; CD, digital download	7
Battlefield	Released: 1999; Label: JDI; CD, digital download	9
Emmanuel	Released:1986; Label: JDI; CD, digital download	6
Battlefield: The Sermon	Released: 2002; Label: JDI; CD, digital download	–
Spontaneous Praise, Vol. 1	Released: 2008; Label: IR; CD, digital download	9
God Is Faithful	Released: 2009; Label: IR; CD, digital download	25
If You Didn't Know... Now You Know	Released: 2011; Label: IR; CD, digital download	11
Hosanna	Released: 2013; Label: IR; CD, digital download	11
