= Greg Dean =

Greg Dean may refer to:

- Greg Dean (cartoonist), creator of the webcomic Real Life
- Greg Dean (footballer) (born 1928), Australian rules footballer
