= Gregory Perry =

Greg(ory) Perry is the name of:

- Gregory Perry, see OpenBSD
- Greg Perry (footballer) (born 1949), Australian footballer for Essendon
- Greg Perry (singer), American singer
- Greg Perry, artist, see Landmark for Peace Memorial
- Greg Perry, one of the Candidates of the South Australian state election, 2006
