= Greg Sutton =

Greg Sutton may refer to:

- Greg Sutton (basketball) (born 1967), American former National Basketball Association player
- Greg Sutton (soccer) (born 1977), Canadian soccer player
