= Greg Bennett =

Greg Bennett may refer to:

- Greg Bennett (triathlete) (born 1972), Australian triathlete
- Greg Bennett (writer) (born 1950), American space flight engineer and science fiction writer
- Greg Bennett Guitars, brand name of stringed instruments
