= Greg Wood (footballer) =

Australian rules footballer

Personal information
- Full name: Greg Wood
- Born: 8 March 1953 (age 73)
- Original team: Wallan
- Height: 175 cm (5 ft 9 in)
- Weight: 73 kg (161 lb)

Playing career^{1}
Years	Club	Games (Goals)
1974	Melbourne	11 (4)
- ^{1} Playing statistics correct to the end of 1974.

Greg Wood (born 8 March 1953) is a former Australian rules footballer who played with Melbourne in the Victorian Football League (VFL) in 1974.

Wood played 42 games with Redan Football Club in the Ballarat Football League between 1968 and 1972 and was named in their team of the 20th Century. He was runner-up in the best and fairest for Redan in 1969. In 1972 he crossed to Wallan football club where he kicked 130 goals in his first season and 179 the following year, the most goals ever scored in a single year for the club.

The Melbourne Football Club spotted his potential and Wood was drafted in 1974. In his first game, during the warm-up, Wood accidentally bounced the ball into his testicles, which left him in agony for much of the first quarter. Not wanting to alert the coach through fear of embarrassment, Wood struggled on to collect 13 disposals.

Despite spectacular high-marking skills and deft touch around goal, Wood was plagued by injuries and retired at the end of 1974. Wood never played football again, and it has been said that he "promised a lot, but didn't deliver" on the big stage of the VFL.

Wood went on to open a successful record shop on Sturt Street in Ballarat, which over 40 years morphed into "L'espresso" a cafe/restaurant/record shop that is a favourite with Ballarat locals (including the late Peter Temple) and tourists alike. Wood still resides in Ballarat.
