= Gregory R. Bryant =

United States admiral

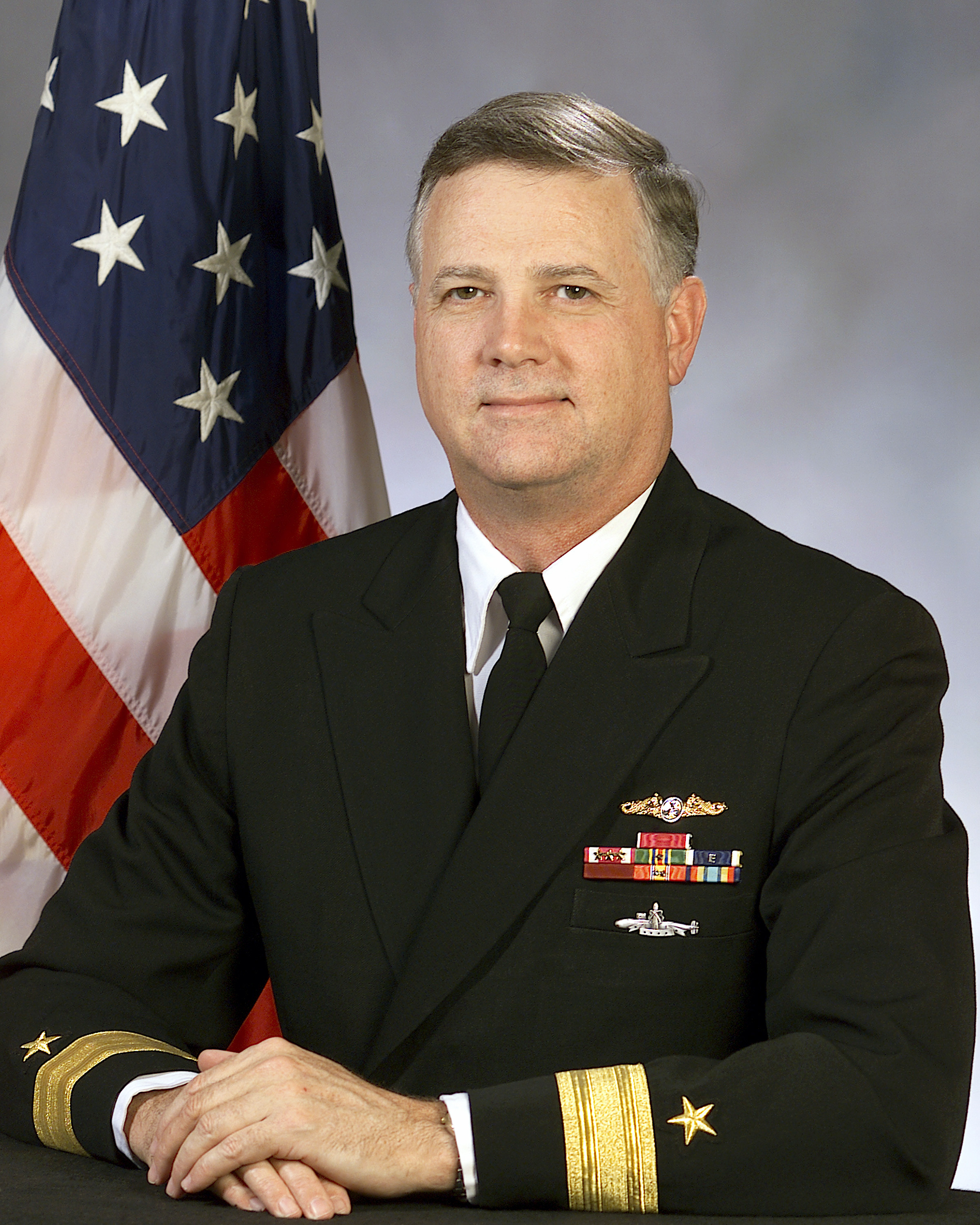
- Official U.S. Navy portrait, 2002
- Born: 1950 (age 75–76); Seattle, Washington
- Military career
- Allegiance: United States of America
- Branch: United States Navy
- Service years: 35
- Rank: Rear Admiral
- Nickname: Greg
- Commands: Engineering Duty Officer School; Puget Sound Naval Shipyard
- Awards: Legion of Merit; Meritorious Service Medal x 4 Good Conduct Medal; Navy E Ribbon; National Defense Service Medal x3 Sea Service Ribbon

Gregory Russell Bryant, Sr. (born November 1950) is a retired U.S. Navy Rear Admiral.

== Navy career ==
Bryant enlisted in the Navy in 1970 and was selected for the Naval Enlisted Scientific Education Program (NESEP). Through NESEP, he attended the University of New Mexico earning a Bachelor of Science degree in electrical engineering magna cum laude with distinction and was commissioned as an Ensign. His first commissioned tour was serving on the engineering staff of Admiral Hyman G. Rickover at the Division of Naval Reactors (Naval Sea Systems Command 08) in Washington, D.C. During this tour, he was selected to join the Engineering Duty Community.

In 1982, Bryant was assigned to Puget Sound Naval Shipyard where he served as a Senior Nuclear Ship Superintendent, a Non-Nuclear Ship Superintendent and Assistant Nuclear Repair Officer. After transferring to Naval Postgraduate School in 1986, he earned a Master of Science degree in Computer Science with distinction. Upon graduation, he received the Monterey Peninsula Council Navy League Award for Highest Academic Achievement and the Armed Forces Communications and Electronics Association Honor Award.

In 1988, Bryant reported to Mare Island Naval Shipyard where he served as Type Desk Officer, Planning and Estimating Superintendent, Nuclear Repair Officer and Nuclear Production Manager. During this tour, he completed his Submarine Engineering Duty qualifications. He then reported to USS Holland (AS-32) then home ported in Apra Harbor, Guam, and served as Repair Officer.

Bryant transferred to Pearl Harbor Naval Shipyard in 1994 where he served as the Engineering and Planning Officer and Operations Officer. In 1998, he commanded the Engineering Duty Officer School in Port Hueneme, California.

Bryant assumed command of Puget Sound Naval Shipyard in July 1999 where, in May 2002, he was selected for promotion to flag officer.

RADM Bryant transferred from Puget Sound Naval Shipyard in September 2002 and reported to the office of the Chief of Naval Operations as Deputy Director Fleet Readiness Division (N43B). He subsequently served as the Deputy Chief of Staff for Fleet Maintenance, U.S. Pacific Fleet and retired from this position in October 2005 after 35 years of Naval service.

=== Awards ===
RADM Bryant's awards include the Legion of Merit, the Meritorious Service Medal (four awards), the Navy Good Conduct Medal, the Navy E Ribbon, the National Defense Service Medal (three awards), and the Sea Service Ribbon.
