= Malcom Gregory Scott =

American screenwriter (born 1962)

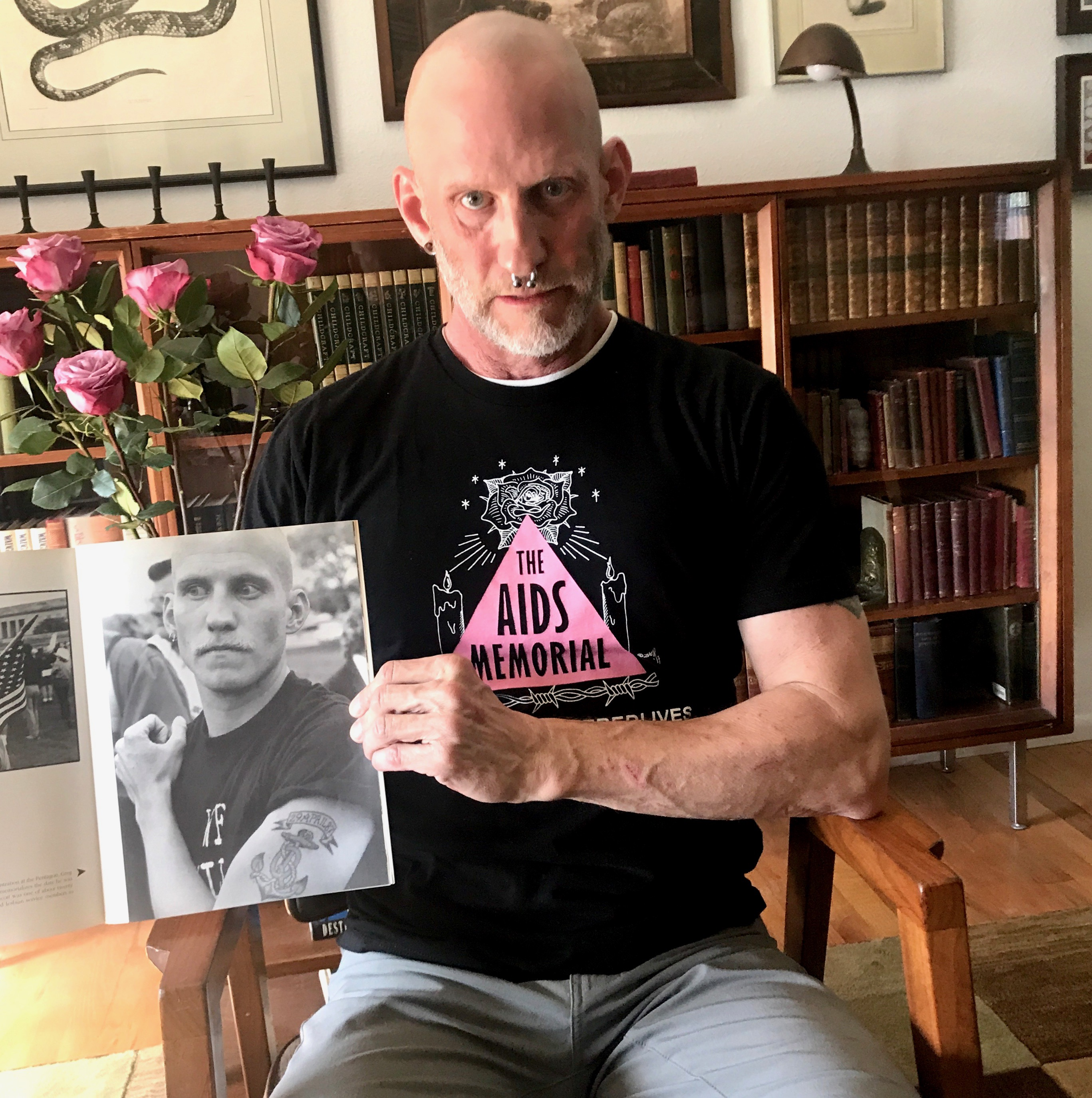
- Scott at home in Portland, Oregon, in April 2018, commemorating the 31st anniversary of his Navy discharge and HIV diagnosis.
- Born: January 26, 1962 (age 64); Little Rock, Arkansas
- Occupations: Writer, activist
- Organization(s): ACT UP, Queer Nation
- Website: malcomgregoryscott.com

Malcom Gregory Scott (born January 26, 1962) also known as Greg Scott, is an American writer, activist, and AIDS survivor. In 1987, the United States Navy (USN) discharged him for homosexuality, after which Scott worked to overturn the Department of Defense (DoD) directive prohibiting the military service of lesbian and gay Americans. Upon his discharge, Scott also learned he had tested positive for the human immunodeficiency virus (HIV), the virus that causes acquired immunodeficiency syndrome (AIDS). He was active in the Washington, D.C., chapters of ACT UP (AIDS Coalition to Unleash Power) and Queer Nation. Scott was an advocate for legal access to medical marijuana, a critic of early HIV prevention education strategies, and a proponent for expanded academic research to support the public policy goals of queer communities. American journalist Michelangelo Signorile once called Scott "the proudest queer in America." Scott worked as a writer for Fox Television's America's Most Wanted, and his writing has appeared in several newspapers and magazines. Scott nearly died of Stage IV AIDS in 1995 and credited marijuana with his survival until effective anti-retroviral therapies became available.

== Early years, Navy discharge, and television ==
Scott's family is from the Southern United States, and he grew up in Oxford, Mississippi, where he attended the Episcopal Church. Although too young to remember the Stonewall riots, Scott would later say he grew up "under the influence of its legacy." In high school, Scott associated with theater students from the University of Mississippi, visited gay bars in nearby Memphis, Tennessee, and was sexually active with other men. He dropped out of college after being harassed for being gay, and in 1985 he joined the United States Navy. He was enrolled in Naval Nuclear Power School in Orlando, Florida. Scott had completed all but a few weeks of the two-year training program when, as he recalls, an agent from the Naval Investigative Service (NIS) informed him that the agency had evidence he was a homosexual and would use that evidence to prosecute him under the Uniform Code of Military Justice unless he voluntarily admitted he was a homosexual. While Scott was being discharged for homosexuality, he learned he had tested positive for the human immunodeficiency virus (HIV), the virus that causes AIDS. After his discharge, Scott returned to Washington, D.C., where he was hired as the first writer at FOX Television's America's Most Wanted in February 1989. From July 1989 until March 1991, he was credited as the program's chief writer. In Washington, Scott also "threw himself into years of furious activism."

== Queer activism in Washington, D.C. ==
On October 12, 1991, Scott appeared onstage at the Washington, D.C., Alternatives Festival as a member of Queer Nation and declared three "Queer Truths": that "Stonewall was a riot," that "Silence equals death," and that "The [queer] revolution has begun." The speech distinguished the emerging queer movement from the "old gay movement" as one seeking public and legal acknowledgment rather than a right to privacy. The queer agenda Scott outlined included repealing state sodomy laws, legally acknowledging queer relationships, permitting queer members of the United States Armed Forces to serve openly, providing legal protections for sexual minorities, and the use of outing as a political tool. Scott would later defend the use of the word "queer" against local critics and question whether "gay" was an appropriate label for a plague-stricken, politically embattled community.

To protest the District of Columbia's sodomy law in December, 1991, Scott and fellow Queer Nation member Stephen Smith, along with two other same-sex couples, turned themselves in to the Third District Headquarters of the Metropolitan Police for violating the statute. The action was held in conjunction with a demonstration at the office of D.C. Council member Wilhelmina Rolark (D-Ward 8), who had obstructed previous repeal efforts in the Judiciary Committee she chaired. Scott was among a group of eleven activists who confronted Rolark at a meeting of the Judiciary Committee on February 20, 1992, prompting anger from council member Hilda Mason (Statehood-At-Large) who shouted, "Get out of my face. Your issue cannot be discussed because it's not on the agenda." Scott shouted back, "We're never going to leave you alone until you move that bill."

On January 22, 1992, during a week of demonstrations marking the nineteenth anniversary of the Roe v. Wade Supreme Court decision legalizing abortion, D.C. Metropolitan Police arrested Scott and seven other members of Queer Nation outside the Shrine of the Immaculate Conception at Catholic University during a Queer Nation protest of Cardinal John O'Connor's "Mass for the Unborn". Queer Nation organized the action to protest the anti-abortion and anti-gay teachings of O'Connor and the Roman Catholic Church.

After undercover officers from the District of Columbia Metropolitan Police Department's Narcotics and Special Investigations Division raided the Follies, an adult theater frequented by gay men, on February 9, 1992, and arrested fourteen patrons on charges of sodomy and other sex-related offenses, Scott asserted that the complaints about reportedly unprotected sex that triggered the raid should have instead led to a visit from a public health worker. Scott subsequently wrote a newspaper column urging diverse queer communities to find "common ground" in their opposition to the sodomy law and rallying them to protest the raids at a demonstration in front of the theater the following Sunday, one week after the raids. More than a hundred protesters attended the demonstration, which began with a rally outside the Follies, where Scott was among the speakers, to decry the city's enforcement of the sodomy law against consenting adults. The peaceful protesters, escorted by a police cruiser, then marched fifteen blocks to the Metropolitan Police Department's headquarters on Indiana Avenue, where they demanded the resignation of District Police Chief Isaac Fulwood.

After author Andrew Sullivan criticized ACT UP as "brash and pushy" and condemned the use of outing as a political tactic, Scott responded by calling Sullivan "the gay antichrist" and defended outing as the queer movement's "most powerful weapon." Sullivan said Scott threw a drink at him in a D.C. nightclub and followed him around calling him a collaborator. Sullivan later recalled Scott was "so over the top it was hard to get too upset. He was almost campy in his anger."

By the end of 1993, Scott was described as "one of a growing number of mostly young, hard-core activists" who had lost faith in the leadership of the "national gay rights organizations."

== Fighting to lift the military's ban on homosexuals ==
In November, 1991, Scott appeared at a news briefing, held as part of the National Gay and Lesbian Task Force's (NGLTF) Creating Change Conference, to predict that the Department of Defense (DOD) would soon be pressured to change its policy stating homosexuality to be incompatible with military service. On Veterans Day, November 11, 1991, Scott organized a Queer Nation demonstration to protest the policy, the first event of its kind. The peaceful demonstration, dubbed "Operation Queer Storm," began with a rally at the Lyndon Baines Johnson Memorial Grove, where Scott and other veterans addressed the crowd, and ended at the Pentagon, where a handful of activists tried but failed to get arrested by pushing through the police line at the top of the Pentagon steps. After presidential candidate Bill Clinton pledged to reverse the Department of Defense' policy on lesbian and gay service members, Scott worked with videographer Tim McCarthy to develop a campaign aimed at getting lesbian and gay voters to the polls.

In April 1993, Scott attended that year's March on Washington for Lesbian, Gay and Bi Equal Rights and Liberation, brandishing a tattoo commemorating his discharge for homosexuality, and distributed a broadsheet called "Homos in the Military: The Queer Truth." He was among twenty current and former lesbian and gay service members to address a rally of two hundred demonstrators outside the Pentagon calling on the military to reverse its policy on homosexuality.

As details of the Don't Ask Don't Tell (DADT) compromise emerged in July, Scott denounced the proposed policy as a broken promise, writing that it "codifies the closet and institutionalizes the military's sexual naivete," and that homophobia was a greater threat to good order and discipline than homosexuality. Scott argued that LGBTQ people were less willing to hide in the age of AIDS, changing the emphasis of the gay and lesbian movement from a fight for the right to privacy to a fight for the right of public acknowledgement. Years later, Scott would argue that the policy was an offense to "our victory over the closet" and posit that the movement's "exaggerated appreciation for privacy" may have contributed to the outcome.

Upon the military's implementation of the DADT policy in the fall of 1993, Scott organized an effort to send copies of the gay publication Out to every ship in the Navy's fleet. The Military Reading Project sought to test the new policy's promised leniency on possessing and reading homosexual material, previously a sufficient justification to initiate an investigation into a service member's sexuality.

Scott was also among the founding directors of the Institute for Gay and Lesbian Strategic Studies (IGLSS), a public policy think tank that sought to better inform public policy debates like the one that ended in the DADT compromise. The endeavor, originating in a meeting held at the 1993 Creating Change Conference, attempted to bring together academic scholars and LGBTQ activists in one organization as never before. After IGLSS joined efforts with economist Lee Badgett in 1994, Scott continued to participate in the organization's efforts, alongside Ann Northrop and Walter L. Williams.

== AIDS activism in Washington, D.C. ==
Scott was an early critic of conventional HIV prevention education strategies, especially the emphasis on condom use. Scott lamented publicly that he himself may have infected someone and that prevention campaigns and the sexual culture placed most of the responsibility on those who were not yet infected rather than on those who already carried HIV. By 1995, he was arguing for harm reductive approaches with prevention messages that were differentiated for HIV-positive and HIV-negative audiences. Scott admitted to participating in gay bathhouse culture and publicly defended queer sexual spaces. In the coming years, he continued to publicly advocate the practice of disclosing if one had been diagnosed with HIV before engaging in any sexual activity and was described as an "outspoken proponent" of unprotected sex.

David Kirp, a professor of public policy at the University of California at Berkeley, criticized Scott for both his views and his admitted sexual practices and implied he was guilty of "finger-pointing and denial." Along with other prevention activists targeted by Kirp, Scott subsequently defended himself in the same publication.

On December 7, 1991, Scott was arrested along with six other members of ACT UP/DC after attempting a "take-over" of the office of District of Columbia Mayor Sharon Pratt Kelly to protest what activists described as her failure to staff twenty federally-funded positions in the local Office of AIDS Activities (OAA).

In September 1992, when United States Assistant Secretary for Health James O. Mason closed the compassionate medical cannabis use program after a surge in applications from people with AIDS, Scott decried the action, and rallied protesters to an ACT UP demonstration to demand expanded access to marijuana for people with AIDS. About three dozen people participated in the protest, blowing whistles, beating drums, and holding a "die-in" outside the Department of Health and Human Services.

== Illness and recovery ==
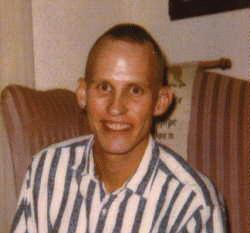
Scott with Stage IV AIDS in 1995.

Scott became an adult in the early years of the AIDS epidemic, and he recalled being very sexually active. He discovered he was positive for HIV as he was being discharged from the Navy for homosexuality in 1987.

Scott declined slowly over the coming years. He had AIDS wasting syndrome, and by 1994, his weight had fallen from one hundred and seventy-five pounds to only one hundred and thirty pounds. Scott also had Kaposi's sarcoma, a viral tumor appearing as skin lesions that was then considered "the scarlet letter of AIDS". The lesions disfigured Scott's eyes, and he underwent difficult systemic therapy with interferon to prevent its spread. Scott later claimed he'd never felt sicker than when undergoing the treatment, likening it to having influenza.

Scott survived on a regimen of sixty pills a day, including morphine. He could recite a litany of side effects caused by the prophylaxis treatments required to prevent a range of potentially fatal opportunistic infections. Scott admitted to smoking cannabis illegally to battle these side effects and to combat AIDS wasting syndrome. He remembers his mother beside his bed, rolling joints for him. In September, 1995, alongside lobbyists from the Marijuana Policy Project, Scott testified before the National Institute on Drug Abuse (NIDA) National Advisory Council on Drug Abuse, to urge the council to approve study drug for Dr. Donald Abram's research protocol into the effectiveness of medical cannabis in people with AIDS.

Scott's doctor, Douglas Ward, remembered his condition during the winter of 1995. "He was a walking skeleton," Ward said. "I didn't expect him to live another couple months." Andrew Sullivan, remembering a chance encounter with Scott on the spring day in 1996 that Sullivan quit his job at The New Republic, observed that Scott had changed: "The anger was gone; a calm had replaced it." Scott himself recalled, "I knew I was dying."

Scott survived until the spring of 1996 when protease inhibitors became available to him, after which he enjoyed a "miracle" recovery, regaining fifty pounds. Sullivan described the dramatic change he watched in Scott, now with "round blue eyes almost tiny in his wide, pudgy face, his frame larger than I remembered it: bulky, lumbering, heavy." Scott credited his use of medical cannabis among the reasons he survived long enough to receive the new anti-retrovirals that saved his life.

After his recovery, Scott left Washington, D.C., in search of milder weather and relocated to Fort Lauderdale, Florida.

== Marijuana activism and community organizing in South Florida ==
In Fort Lauderdale, Scott continued to advocate for safe, legal access to medical cannabis, appearing in August, 1997, before the Florida Constitutional Revision Commission, which held decennial authority under Florida law to place propositions on the ballot to amend the state constitution. Scott asked the commission to propose a constitutional amendment that would allow patients with a doctor's prescription to obtain and use medical cannabis. A month later, Scott appeared at a press conference announcing an effort by the Coalition Advocating Medical Marijuana (CAMM) to put a medical marijuana initiative on the 1998 ballot by gathering four hundred and thirty-five thousand registered voters' signatures.

On May 27, 1998, Scott traveled with CAMM to Orlando, Florida to attend the Marijuana Education Summit, a two-day meeting of hundreds of law enforcement officers and school and youth officials sponsored by the Drug Free America Foundation and the Florida Department of Law Enforcement (FDLE), to strategize against the emerging medical cannabis movement in Florida. CAMM was not allowed to participate in the panels or stage its own session and was forced to hold its press conference in the hotel parking lot. During a question and answer session, Scott told the former director of the Office of National Drug Control Policy, William Bennett, that marijuana had helped him survive AIDS. Scott asked Bennett if he thought arresting patients was a way to build a virtuous America, referring to Bennet's 1993 book The Book of Virtues, but Bennet ignored the question. Later that day, after speaking out of turn, Scott was forcibly removed from the meeting, arrested, and taken to jail. Scott said "I was being very obnoxious. They treated us with derision from the moment we arrived."

In April 2000, Scott, as executive director of CAMM, traveled to Tallahassee, Florida, to lobby state lawmakers to advance model legislation that would accomplish the same protections for medical users as the referendum initiative, for which the organization was then collecting signatures for placement on the 2002 ballot. Scott served as a regional spokesperson for Floridians for Medical Rights, the political action committee responsible for collecting those petition signatures.

While in Florida, Scott also worked for changes at the national and international levels. On January 22, 1998, Scott testified before the National Academy of Sciences Institute of Medicine as it compiled findings for Marijuana and Medicine: Assessing the Science Base, a report commissioned a year earlier by the Office of National Drug Control Policy. Scott told the investigators how marijuana helped save his life by combatting the side effects of other medications, enhancing appetite, reducing nausea, and mitigating pain. When the report was published in March 1999, Scott's testimony was among several patient case studies included to support the report's conclusion that "there are some limited circumstances in which we recommend smoking marijuana for medical uses." On June 9, 1998, Scott appeared on a medical marijuana panel convened as part of the United Nations Special Session on the "World Drug Problem."

In Fort Lauderdale, Scott also volunteered for other community organizations, serving on the board of directors and as spokesperson for Pride South Florida, which hosted an annual film festival as well as the annual LGBTQ parade and festival, the Stonewall National Library and Archives, and the People With AIDS Coalition (PWAC) of Broward County, of which Scott also served as president for one year. As president of PWAC, Scott called out President George W. Bush for not increasing Ryan White CARE Act funding to meet increasing costs, criticized Florida Governor Jeb Bush for prioritizing education as the state's top challenge while Florida ranked third among states in AIDS cases, and accused the state legislature of "abandoning" the six thousand sickest Floridians with AIDS when they voted for deep budget cuts for AIDS programs. Scott also criticized Florida for making money from tourism but spending none on prevention of HIV, which Scott and others said was becoming the state's "greatest export", spoke out about the dangers of Nonoxynol-9, criticized the Family Medical Leave Act as elitist and of limited use to many people with AIDS because same-sex families were not legally recognized, advocated for inmates to receive a thirty-day supply of HIV medications upon release from the Broward County Jail, and wrangled with the regional HIV Planning Council over what the PWAC deemed "exclusionary language" in its statements of priorities.

In 2002, Scott relocated to Northern California, saying he wanted to retire from activism somewhere that sodomy and medical marijuana were already legal.
