= Don Chambers =

American cartoonist

Don Chambers is author and artist for the newspaper comic strip Mannequins. Mannequins was first published in the Arthur Graphic-Clarion, Arthur, Illinois, in 1996. Mannequins was the first newspaper comic strip to feature computer-generated and physical 3D characters along with actual photographic images in the background of the comic panels. Chambers' artwork and comics have been featured in dozens of magazines, including Farm Journal, Street Rodder and Car Craft. His animations and graphics have been used in four regional Emmy Award winning documentaries for PBS.

== Works ==
- Mannequins at Home in Illinois and Western Indiana
- Recipes from the Soybean Farm
- Mannequins Rocks Southern England and the Midwestern United States
- A Pig Named Wedge
- Mannequins: A Tenth-Anniversary Collection
