= Orton (surname) =

Orton is a surname. Notable people with the surname include:

- Arthur Orton (1834–1898), English man identified as the "Tichborne Claimant"
- Azariah Giles Orton (1789–1864), American Presbyterian theologian
- Beth Orton (born 1970), English singer-songwriter
- Bill Orton (1948–2009), American politician from Utah
- Daniel Orton (born 1990), American basketball player
- Edward Orton, Sr. (1829–1899), American geologist, and university president from Ohio
- Edward Orton, Jr. (1863–1932), American businessman and philanthropist
- Frank Orton (born 1942), Swedish lawyer, civil servant, jurist and ombudsman
- George Orton (1873–1958), Canadian runner
- Greg Orton (disambiguation), multiple people
- Harlow S. Orton (1817–1895), American lawyer and judge
- James Orton (1830–1877), American naturalist
- Joe Orton (1933–1967), English playwright
- Kyle Orton (born 1982), American football player
- Newell Orton (1915–1941), Royal Air Force pilot and "flying ace"
- P. D. Orton (Peter Orton, 1916–2005), British mycologist
- Philo A. Orton (1837–1919), American politician and jurist
- Reginald Orton (1810–1862), British surgeon
- Richard Orton (1940–2013), British academic and composer of electronic music
- Samuel Orton (1879–1948), American physician, and his wife June Lyday Orton (1897–1977), who both pioneered the study of learning disabilities
- Virginia Keating Orton (1882–1960), American administrator from Washington
- William Orton (businessman) (1826–1878), American business executive
- A family of American wrestlers, consisting of:
  - Bob Orton (1929–2006), the family founder
  - His older son Bob Orton Jr. (born 1950)
  - His younger son Barry Orton (1958–2021)
  - His grandson Randy Orton (born 1980), son of Bob Jr.
