= Boa blanchardensis =

Boa blanchardensis Temporal range: Late Pleistocene 0.034–0.015 Ma

Scientific classification
- Kingdom: Animalia
- Phylum: Chordata
- Class: Reptilia
- Order: Squamata
- Suborder: Serpentes
- Family: Boidae
- Genus: Boa
- Species: †B. blanchardensis

Binomial name
- †Boa blanchardensis Bochaton & Bailon, 2018

Extinct species of snake

Boa blanchardensis, also known as the Marie-Galante boa, is an extinct species of Boa from the island of Marie Galante in the Lesser Antilles. It lived on the island during the Late Pleistocene until approximately 15.000 years ago when it became extinct for unknown reasons. With an estimated length of up to 1.39 m (4 ft 7 in), it was the largest terrestrial vertebrate on the island. Discoveries of fossil bones in caves suggest that it may have at least occasionally hunted bats.

== Discovery and naming ==
The fossils of Boa blanchardensis are exclusively known from three caves on Marie-Galante in the Guadeloupe archipelago. These three caves consist of the Cadet 2 cave, Cadet 3 rock shelter and Blanchard Cave, the later providing the vast majority of fossil material. Within these caves, the Boa fossils were exclusively found in the older Pleistocene sediments and absent in those dating to the Holocene. The Marie-Galante snake fossils were identified and catalogued in various studies before being described as a new species by Bochaton and Bailon in 2018. Following the work of Henderson and Powell (2009), the researchers consider Boa blanchardensis to be a distinct species like the two extant Antillean boas, rather than a subspecies of Boa constrictor from mainland South America. The holotype specimen is MEC-A-18.1.1.1, a basisphenoid bone from Blanchard Cave. The material also includes a number of skull bones, vertebrae and ribs thought to stem from at least four individual snakes, all of which are stored at the Musée Edgard Clerc.

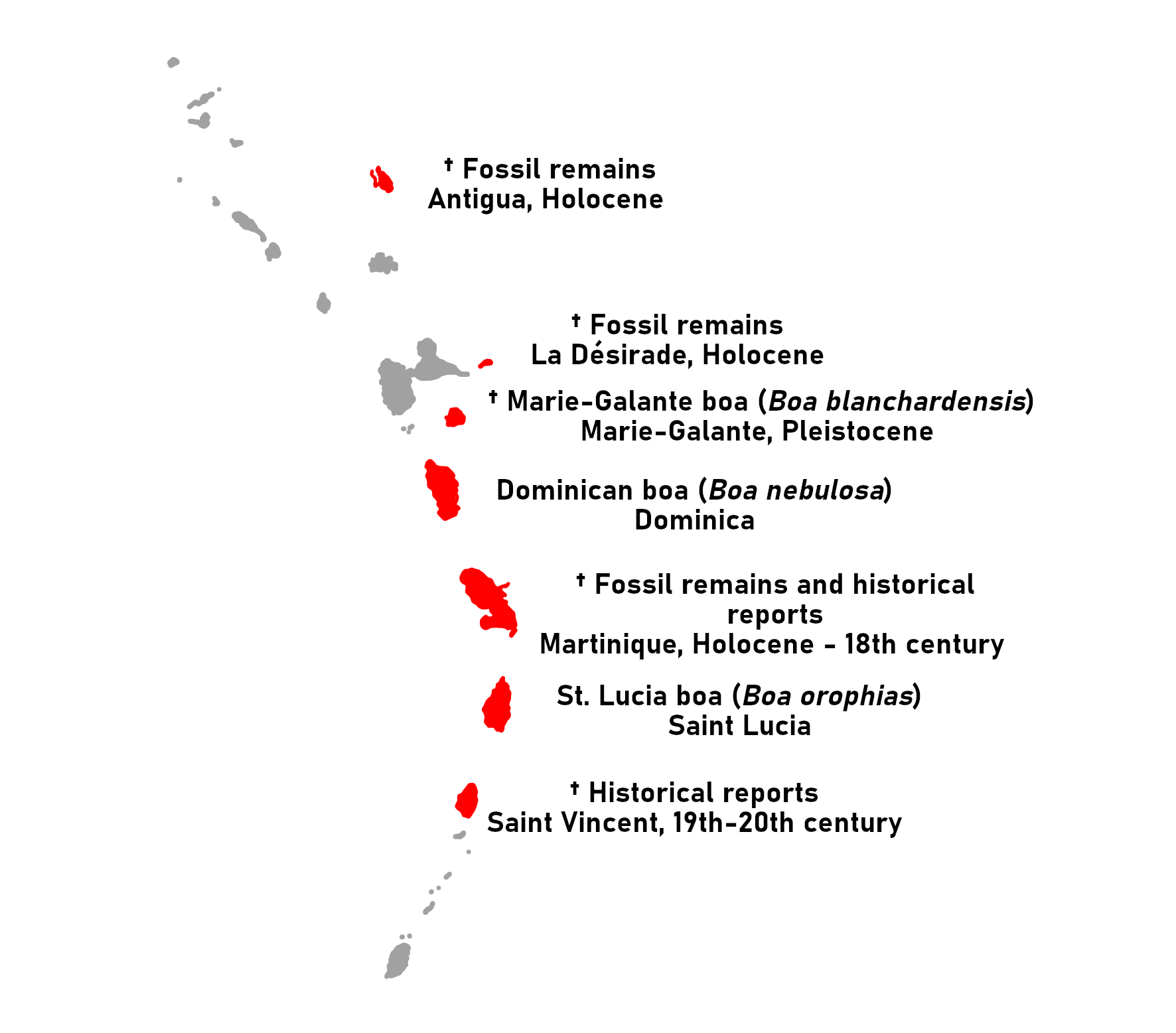
Boa species of the Lesser Antilles

The species is named for the Blanchard Cave, where a vast majority of the fossil material has been collected. Bochaton and Bailon also suggest two vernacular names, Marie-Galante boa in English and boa de Marie-Galante in French.

== Description ==
The bones of the Marie-Galante boa show a variety of traits that clearly set it apart from any other species of boa. The basipterygoid processes, which is located on the basisphenoid, is only weakly developed and the palatine process of the maxilla is triangular and extends weakly medially. Boa blanchardensis has well laterally opening foramen on its superior dental canal and a bony outgrowth of the ectopterygoid bone matches with the postorbital. The area where the ectopterygoid and pterygoid meet is marked by a prominent depression in the bone, which is surrounded by four lobes on its anterior, posterior, dorsal and ventral side. The posterior end of the ectopterygoid meanwhile shows a slight inwards curve. Two foramen are located at the anterior end of the pterygoid. On the palatine bone the posteromedial process is enlarged and extends towards the side. The supratemporal bone is almost symmetrical and the exoccipital has a high occipital crest that incurves towards its back. The compound bone possesses a short retroarticular process and the neural spines of the trunk vertebrae are fairly low. This state of the neural spine in particular unifies the Marie-Galante boa with that of the Dominican boa, while clearly separating both of them from the continental Boa constrictor.

Based on the length of the vertebral centra, specimens of Boa blancharensis may have ranged in size between 73–139 cm (29–55 in). Assuming an extreme value for the average estimation error, the estimated size range is inflated to 67–151 cm (26–59 in). Despite this small size, the morphology of the vertebrae as well as paleohistological analysis indicate that the examined bones belonged to animals that had already slowed down their growth. However, as no appropriate modern comparison could be made, the authors were unable to rule out the fact that the specimens were still growing, although at a much slower rate. Accordingly, specimens outside the calculated maximum size range could have existed. Regardless on whether or not the discovered specimens reflect the largest possible size, Boa blancharensis was the largest land vertebrate of Pleistocene Maria-Galante.

== Ontogeny ==
When comparing the larger vertebrae of the middle trunk region, several traits can be observed that seem to vary depending on the age of the animal. The centra of the vertebrae in younger individuals are notably shorter and the bone between the articular processes is less constricted, as the prezygapophyses are oriented further forward and the postzygapophyses further back. The neural spines are even shorter than in adults and the joints between the individual vertebrae wider than they are high. Following these variable features, the majority of fossil remains found on Marie-Galante represent what is considered to be the adult morphology. However, in modern Boa constrictor individuals the trunk vertebrae located further back on the body show similar anatomy to those of juvenile specimens, which means that even bones not showing adult morphology may not necessarily belong to immature specimens. Regardless, Bochaton and Bailon were able to determine that the size range they calculated could not be entirely explained by the position of the vertebrae. Subsequently, although the age of the smaller specimens could not be determined, it was still discovered that the smallest bones could not belong to the same individuals responsible for the maximum size estimates.

== Paleoecology ==
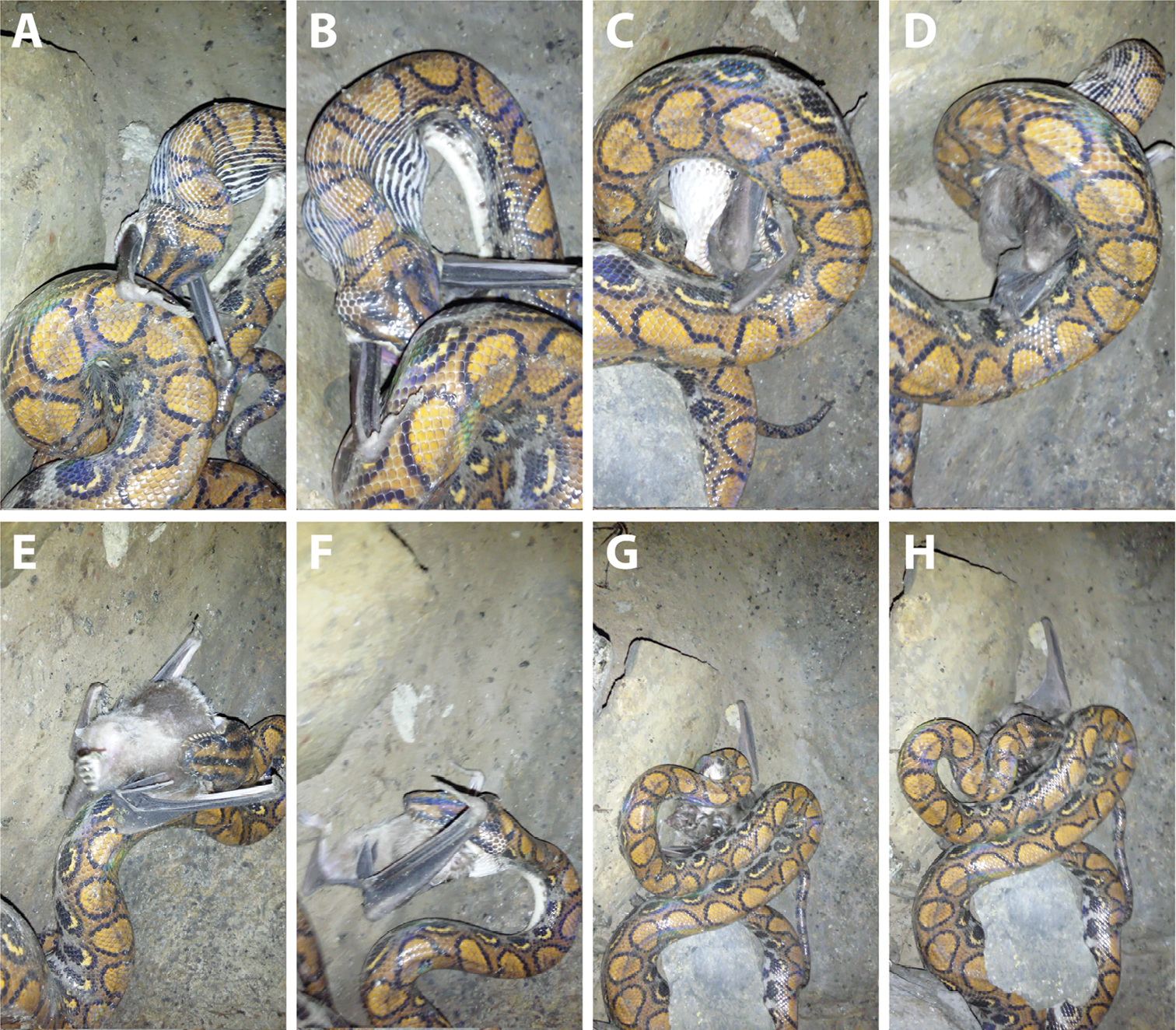
A rainbow boa (Epicrates cenchria) feeding on a common vampire bat (Desmodus rotundus)

While the majority of reptile fossils found in the cave deposits of Maria-Galante are thought to have been transported there as prey items of raptorial birds, there is no evidence to suggest that the same was the case for the remains of Boa blancharensis. Since they lack any obvious signs of digestion or breakage, it is instead hypothesized that the snakes entered the caves not as prey but as predators, potentially feeding on roosting bats. Predation on bats is known from both the mainland Boa constrictor, as well as the two species currently inhabiting the Lesser Antilles and even other boids. This hunting method is not restricted to smaller Boa specimens, which means that the nature of the locality is unlikely to account for the small size of the fossils. Instead, it is considered much more likely that the Maria-Galante boa was a true island dwarf whose size was restricted by the lack of large terrestrial prey items. According to Boback (2006), dwarf boas commonly adopt a more arboreal lifestyle than their larger relatives. During the Pleistocene, the island of Maria-Galante was notably larger than it is today and drier in its climate, hosting a much greater diversity of bats. In addition to bats, Boa blancharensis may have also fed on various native birds; however, the avian fossil record of the island is mostly unknown.

== Range and extinction ==
While Boa blancharensis itself is only found on Maria-Galante, the species is part of a larger series of island Boa species found across the Lesser Antilles. Today, the only surviving species are the Dominican boa and the St. Lucia boa found on Dominica and Saint Lucia, respectively. However, boas were previously more widespread across the island chain. Besides the Pleistocene fossils from Maria-Galante, Holocene remains were discovered on the island of Antigua further north, while historical records indicate that boas were present on Martinique and Saint Vincent during the 18th, 19th and 20th century. The historical reports from Martinique are additionally supported by the discovery of multiple snake vertebrae that appear to have been reworked into beads by the native human population. This, however, leaves gaps between the different island populations, notably on most of the other islands of the Guadeloupe archipelago. Only a single bone of a boa is known from the two main islands, specifically the western island of Basse-Terre. This vertebrae, which has been found at an archaeological site and was clearly reworked by human hands, may not have originated on the island itself, leaving the record of the genus from the main Guadeloupe archipelago ambiguous until further discoveries are made. Another vertebrae of an indetermined species of Boa was discovered in Holocene sediments on the smaller island of La Désirade and, in this case, likely originated there, seeing as it was discovered in the den of an owl. This vertebrae may serve as an additional indicator that boas could have once been present on the main islands, as during the Pleistocene La Désirade, Basse-Terre and Grande-Terre formed a single landmass.

Although a multitude of fossil material is present in the Pleistocene sediments of the Maria-Galante caves, no material of Boa blancharensis could be recovered from younger Holocene layers. This makes the Maria-Galante boa the only known reptile from the island to have become extinct during the Pleistocene. The only other reptile previously thought to have disappeared from the island was a colubrid snake; however, its remains were later also discovered at a pre-Columbian archaeological site, pushing its extinction into the Holocene. It is possible that the extinction of Boa blancharensis was tied to the change in climate towards the end of the Pleistocene, which heavily affected the native bat diversity and may have also influenced the local bird population. However, due to the fact that little is known about the Pleistocene avifauna of the island, the role birds may have played in the extinction of the snake can only be speculated on. Another possibility is that Boa blancharensis may have survived into the Holocene, given that data on the early Holocene of Guadeloupe is restricted to Maria-Galante. While Bochaton and Bailon argue that human influence cannot be ruled out as a factor, a later paper by Bochaton discusses the relationship between the boas and people of the Lesser Antilles, mentioning that to the Saladoid and Taíno people boas were generally of mythological significance and not viewed as food.
