= William Orton =

William Orton may refer to:

- Bill Orton (1948–2009), U.S. Representative from Utah
- William Orton (businessman), president of Western Union

== See also ==
- Orton (surname)
- William Orton Williams, Confederate officer during the American Civil War
