= Crawl Cay boa =

Scientific classification
- Kingdom: Animalia
- Phylum: Chordata
- Class: Reptilia
- Order: Squamata
- Suborder: Serpentes
- Family: Boidae
- Genus: Boa
- Species: B. imperator

Binomial name
- Boa imperator

Dwarf Boa imperator population

The Crawl Cay boa is a dwarf Boa imperator population that reaches a maximum length of about 5 ft (1.5 m). Characteristics of this snake are the very gray background colour with black speckling which is also on the head. The snakes have saddling like the common boa, which continue onto the tail.

Their natural habitat is the island they are named after, Crawl Cay (pronounced /ˈkiː/). Crawl Cay is off the east coast of Belize. Crawl Cay, a half-moon shaped cay five acres (2.0 ha) in size, is part of the Turneff Island Archipelago. Collecting snakes is prohibited as the Turneff Archipelago is now a National Reserve.

Please note:

The location of the island is often reported as above but this is not the true location of the boas.

The photo in Russo’s book, is the correct island, but it doesn’t fit the description he gives of the caye that’s located at the Turneff Atoll.

Instead there are two Crawl Caye’s and it is at the other caye where the boas can be found.

This island is sometimes known as Crawl Caye Placencia or Crawl Caye Southern.

Both islands were recently up for sale by Belize Real Estate MLS and on the website Privateislandsonline.com, where both sites have descriptions and information on the two locations. It was the Southern caye, that lies north of Victoria Channel, at the edge of the South Water Marine Reserve near Placencia that mentions the boas as they are protected and the other caye where Russo and some other say the boas are located, which is 117 km (73 mi) further north at the Atoll had no mention of boas at all.

Crawl Caye Placencia is approximately 5 miles (8.0 km) east from Maya Beach and Siene Bite; 11 miles (18 km) from east from Pt. Placencia Village. It is the exact shape as the island Russo uses.

In a Research Article published in ‘Molecular Phylogenetics and Evolution’, entitled: ‘Phylogeographic and population genetic analyses reveal multiple species of Boa and independent origins of insular dwarfism’, the location of Crawl Caye boas is not at the Turneff Atoll but at Crawl Caye Southern.

Author for Correspondence on this manuscript is: Todd A. Castoe, Department of Biology, University of Texas at 17 Arlington, Arlington, TX, 76019, USA.

Also this location is clearly shown in the paper ‘Natural History and Conservation of Island Boas (Boa constrictor) in Belize’, by Scott M. Boback published in 2005.
