= Boa imperator sabogae =

Scientific classification
- Kingdom: Animalia
- Phylum: Chordata
- Class: Reptilia
- Order: Squamata
- Suborder: Serpentes
- Family: Boidae
- Genus: Boa
- Species: B. imperator
- Subspecies: B. i. sabogae

Trinomial name
- Boa imperator sabogae (Barbour, 1906)

Synonyms
- Epicrates sabogae Barbour, 1906

Subspecies of snake

Boa imperator sabogae (previously Boa constrictor sabogae) is a subspecies of large, heavy-bodied snake. It is a member of the family Boidae.

This subspecies of Boa imperator is endemic to the Pearl Islands, off the Pacific Coast of Panama.
