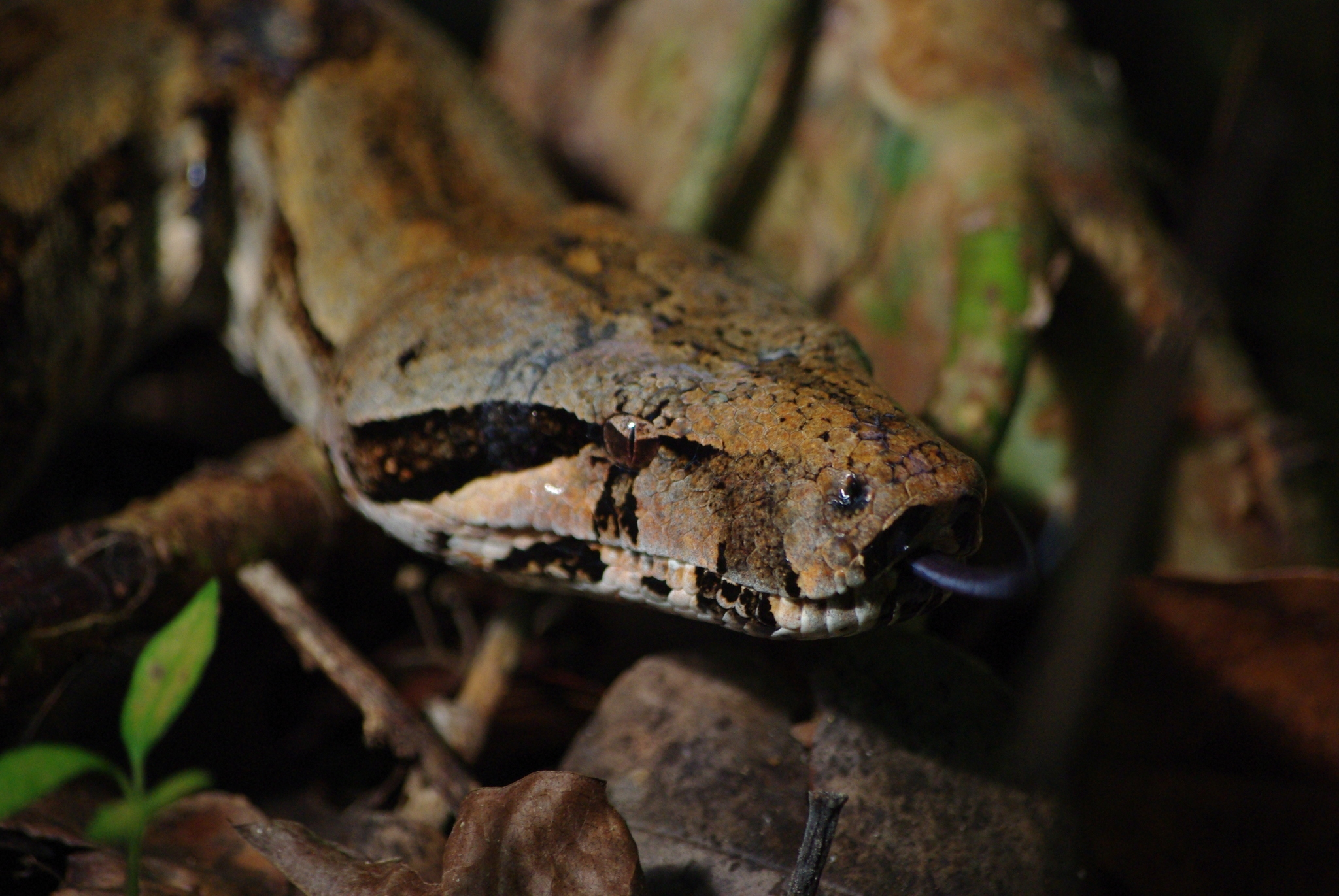

Conservation status
- Endangered (IUCN 3.1)
- CITES Appendix II

Scientific classification
- Kingdom: Animalia
- Phylum: Chordata
- Class: Reptilia
- Order: Squamata
- Suborder: Serpentes
- Family: Boidae
- Genus: Boa
- Species: B. orophias

Binomial name
- Boa orophias Linnaeus, 1758
- Location of Saint Lucia

= Boa orophias =

Species of snake

Boa orophias, the Saint Lucia boa or San Lucia boa, is a species of snake in the family Boidae. The species is endemic to Saint Lucia. Boa orophias was described as a full species by Carl Linnaeus in 1758, but many later authors have classified it as a subspecies of Boa constrictor. According to the IUCN Red List, Boa orophias is a species, which they have listed as Endangered. It eats small mammals and birds.
