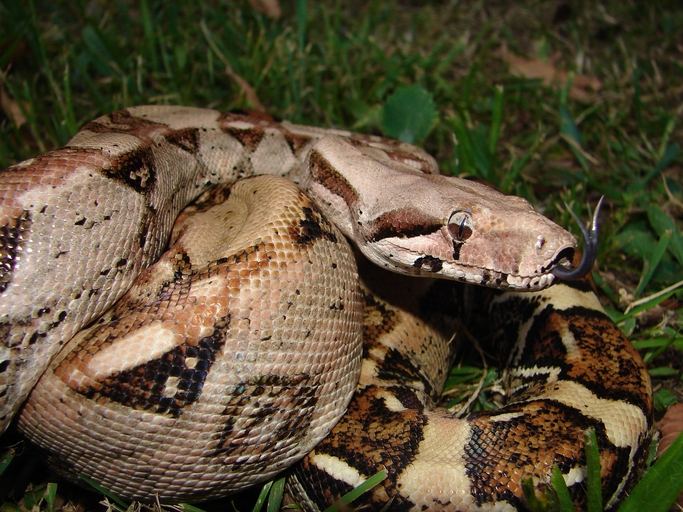

Conservation status
- Least Concern (IUCN 3.1)
- CITES Appendix II (Note: Except B. c. occidentalis which is included in Appendix I)

Scientific classification
- Kingdom: Animalia
- Phylum: Chordata
- Class: Reptilia
- Order: Squamata
- Suborder: Serpentes
- Family: Boidae
- Genus: Boa
- Species: B. imperator

Binomial name
- Boa imperator Daudin, 1803
- Distribution range for Boa imperator

Synonyms
- Boa imperator Daudin, 1803; Boa eques Eydoux & Souleyet, 1842; Boa constrictor var. isthmica Garman, 1884; Boa constrictor imperator – Ihering, 1910; Boa constrictor imperator – Forcart, 1951

= Boa imperator =

Species of snake

Boa imperator (or Boa constrictor imperator in common usage) is a large and heavy-bodied arboreal species of nonvenomous, constrictor-type snake in the family Boidae. One of the most popular pet snakes (often bred in captivity) in the world, B. imperator's native range is from Mexico through Central and South America (west of the Andes Mountains, mainly in Colombia), with local populations on several small Caribbean islands. It is commonly called the Central American boa, northern boa, Colombian boa (or Colombian red-tailed boa), common boa and common northern boa.

== Description ==
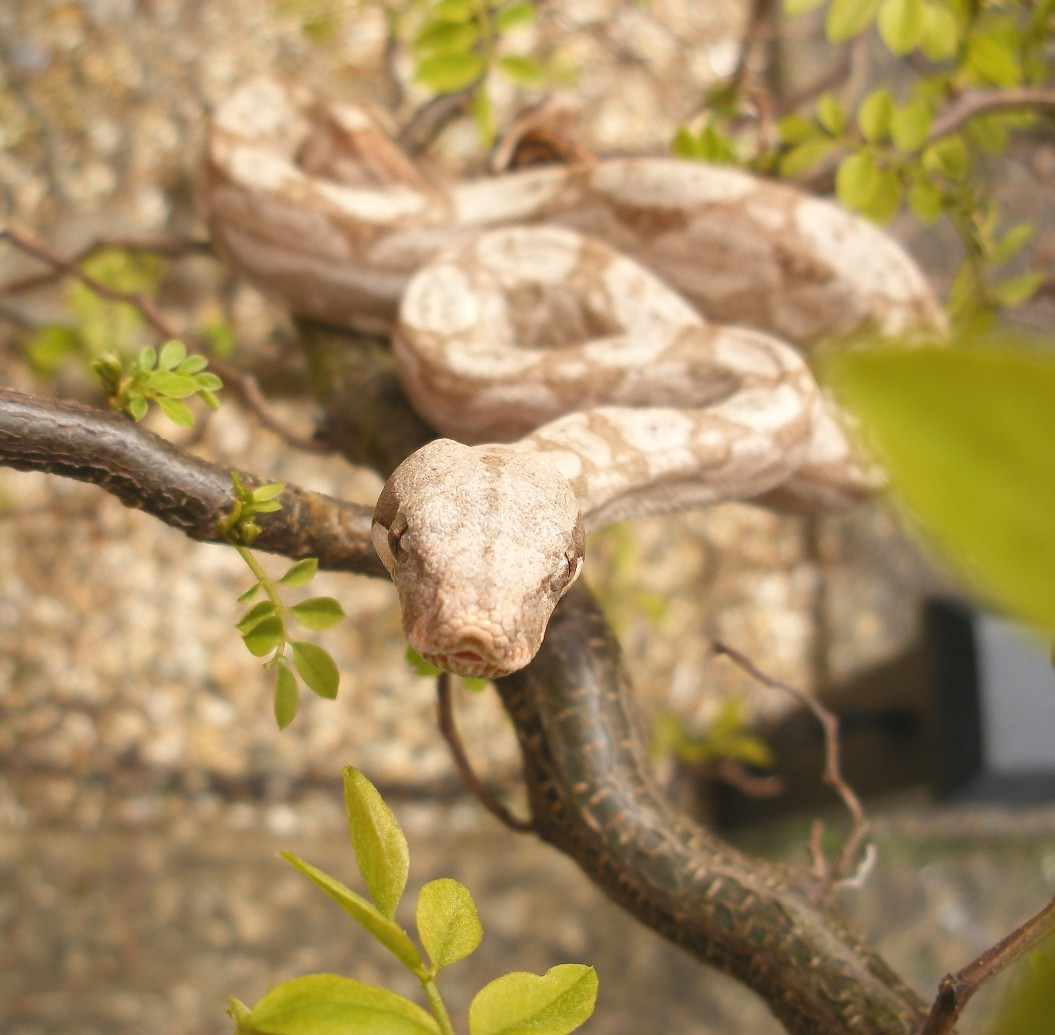
A specimen from the Cayos Cochinos

Boa imperator is a wide-ranging species, living in both Central America and the northern parts of South America. As a result, the appearance of this snake varies greatly depending on the specific locality. As one of the smaller Boa species, they average between 1.3 m (4.2 ft.) and 2.5 m (8.2 ft.) in length when fully grown, but have been known to reach 3.7 m (12 ft.). They usually weigh around 6 kg (13 lb), although females are significantly larger than males. Lifespan in the wild is around 20–30 years, but 40 can be exceeded in captivity.

Although Boa imperator exhibits almost identical patterns to Boa constrictor, this species often has a darker tail, usually dark brown or very dark red. They are, however, usually just as colorful as their counterparts and, like the larger boas, can be bred into a variety of different colors, given the right conditions to breed.

Notably, the species is one of only two in snakes to have a confirmed XY sex chromosome system.

One population, found on the Cayos Cochinos (Hog Islands) off the northern coast of Honduras, have evolved naturally hypomelanistic skin (containing reduced melanin), resulting in lighter-colored snakes; nonetheless, they retain the "signature" darkened tail-tip seen in the species, though the color of the tail may vary from salmon-pink to orange.

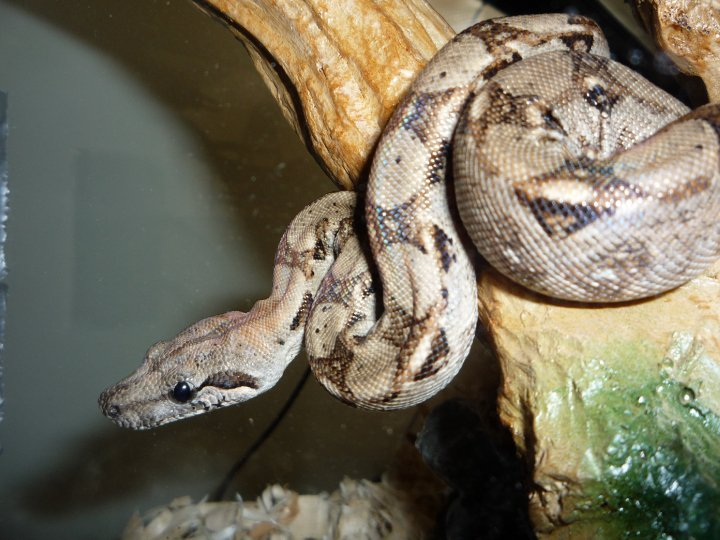
A specimen from Nicaragua

Another well-known locality of Boa imperator is the population from Nicaragua, which typically have a compact saddle-pattern on their backs, often showing circular and spherical shapes.

Boas from Colombia can be among the largest boas as well as some of the smallest; this species includes a number of dwarf insular populations on several Caribbean islands, such as the Crawl Cay boa. Off the Pacific coast of Colombia, smaller to medium-sized boas can be found living on Gorgona Island, a former Colombian prison colony that nature has reclaimed, with a high rate of biodiversity present on the island.

=== Scalation ===
Boa imperator has 55–79 dorsal scales, 225–253 ventral scales, 47–69 subcaudal scales, 18–22 supralabial scales and 1–2 anal scales.

=== Identification ===
Boa imperator is commonly confused with other Boa species, such as Boa constrictor. Both have very similar patterns, to include a reddening of the lighter colors towards a deeper or darker red on the tail. This has resulted in a non-scientific term - "red-tailed boa" - used to refer to both species (mostly in the pet trade).

== Taxonomy ==
Boa imperator was formerly classified as a subspecies of Boa constrictor until DNA sequencing identified B. c. imperator as a separate genetic lineage with 5-7% divergence from B. constrictor.

The boa population from the Pacific Coast of Mexico, previously considered a subspecies of B. constrictor and subsequently of B. imperator, has been separated as another species, Boa sigma.

=== Subspecies ===
Scientific name	Taxon author	Common name	Geographic range
B. i. imperator	Daudin, 1803	Central American boa, northern boa or Colombian boa	The entire range except for the Pearl Islands
B. i. sabogae	(Barbour, 1906)	Pearl Islands boa	The Pearl Islands off the Pacific Coast of Panama in the Gulf of Panama

Certain Boa imperator populations such as the ones in the Cayos Cochinos (or the Hog Islands) off the northern coast of Honduras; the Corn Islands off the eastern coast of Nicaragua; the Tarahumara Mountains in Mexico; Ecuador; etc. are classified as different "locales" of Boa imperator, but not as subspecies.

== Geographic range ==
Boa imperator can be found in some regions of Mexico, Central America and northwestern Colombia, as well as several islands along the coasts of these areas. The type locality given is "l'Amerique meridionale, principalement au Mexique" (Central America, principally Mexico).

Boa imperator prefers to live in rainforests due to humidity, temperature, cover from potential predators and ample prey.

== Behavior ==
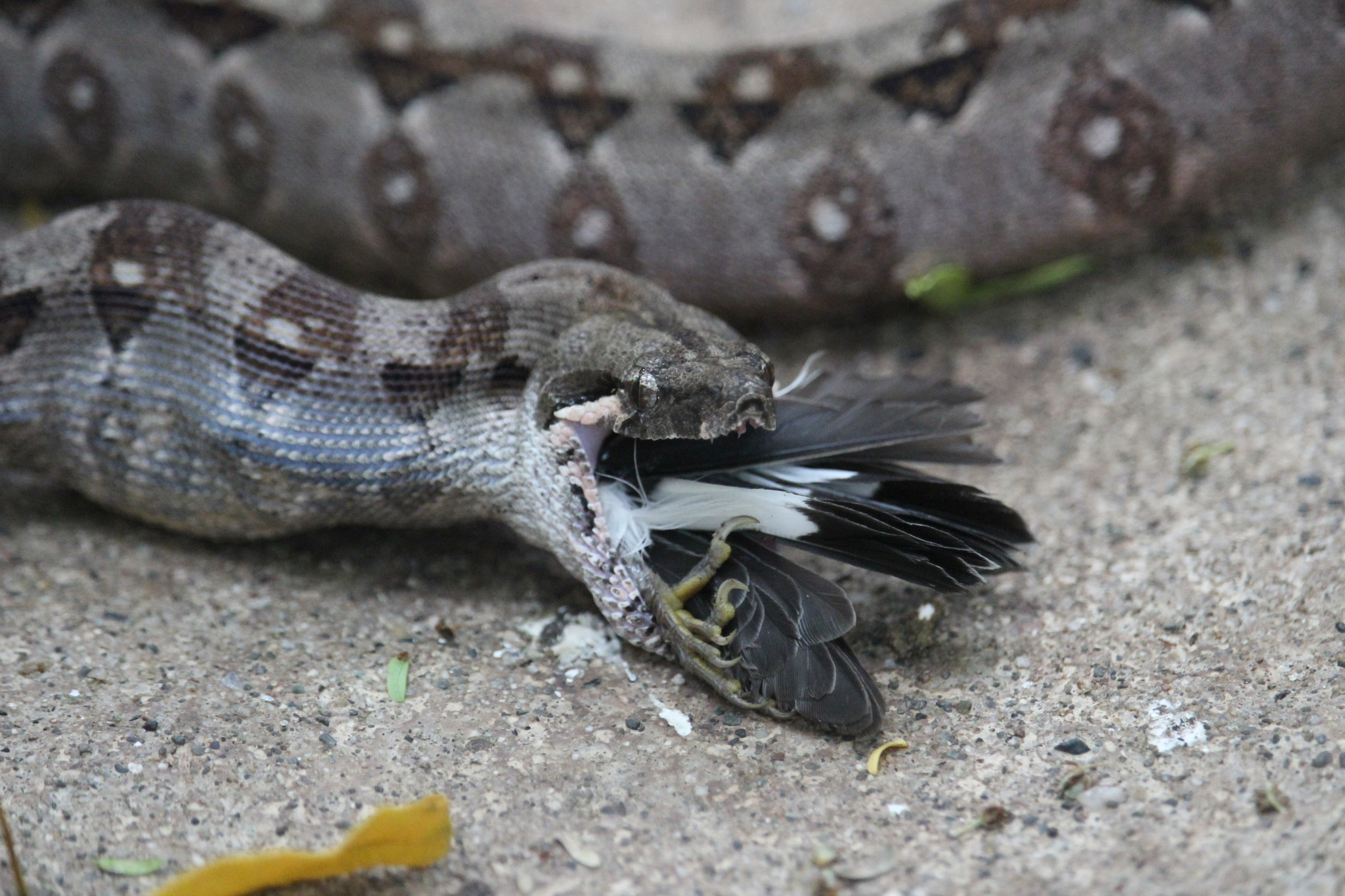
Eating a bird

Boa imperator generally live on their own, and do not interact with any other snakes unless they want to mate. They are crepuscular, but they may bask during the day when night-time temperatures are too low. As semi-arboreal snakes, young Boa imperator may climb into trees and shrubs to forage; however, they become mostly terrestrial as they become older and heavier. Boa imperators strike when they perceive a threat. Their bite can be painful, especially from large snakes, but is rarely dangerous to humans. Specimens from Central America are more irascible, hissing loudly and striking repeatedly when disturbed, while those from South America tame down more readily. Like all snakes, Boa imperators in a shed cycle are more unpredictable, because the substance that lubricates between the old skin and the new makes their eyes appear milky, blue or opaque, so that the snake cannot see very well, causing it to be more defensive than it might be otherwise.

== Hunting and diet ==
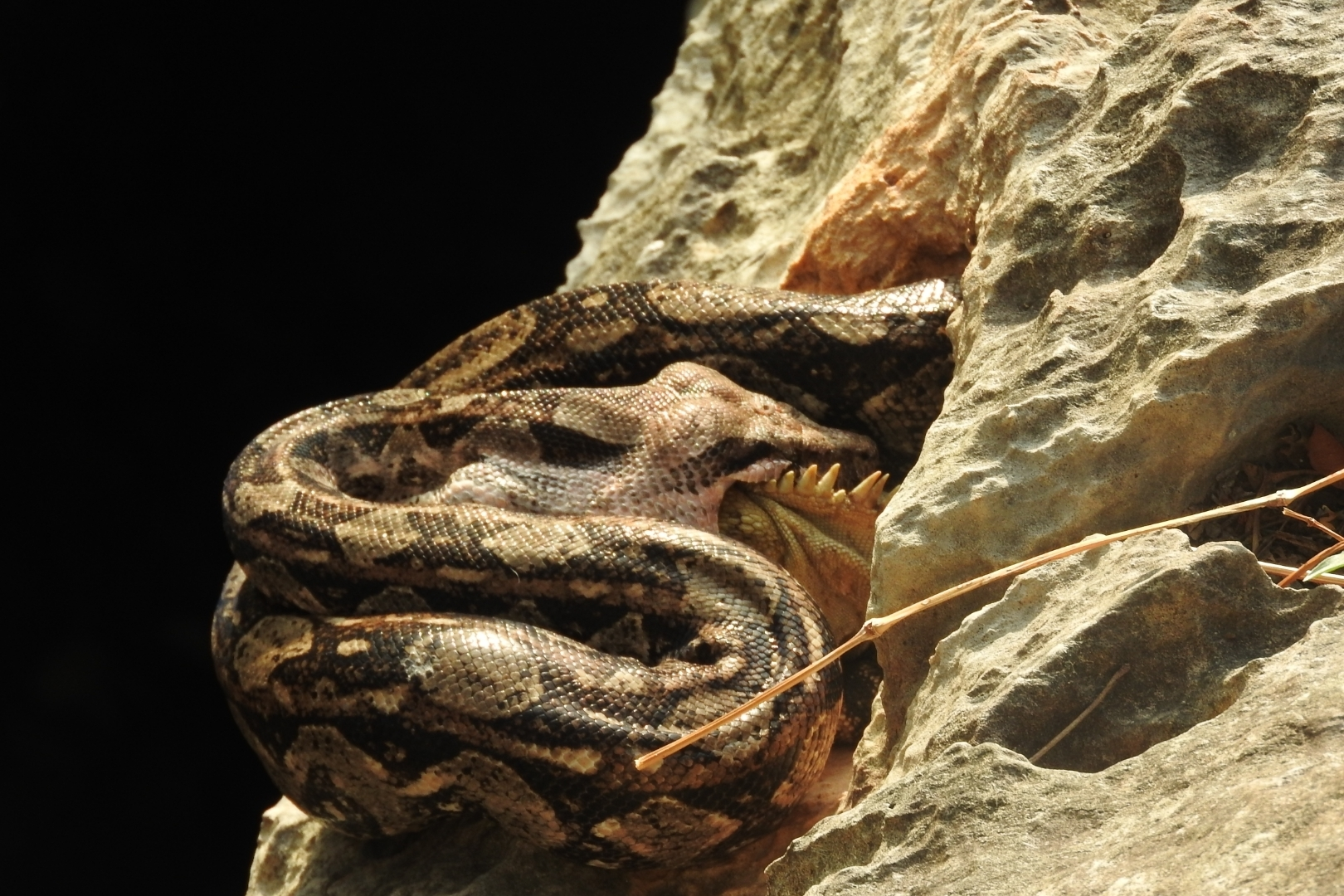
Feeding on a black spiny-tailed iguana

Boa imperator, like most Boa species, has a varied diet that consists mainly of mammals (such as Yucatan squirrels, Deppe's squirrels, black rats, big-eared climbing rats, Virginia opossums, agoutis, white-nosed coatis, gray foxes, Andean porcupines, Colombian white-faced capuchins, and pygmy fruit-eating bats), birds (such as blue-gray tanagers, Altamira oriole, domestic fowl, New World vultures, and hummingbirds) and lizards (such as Iguana iguana and Medopheos edracanthus). Bats are ambushed on trees, at the entrance of caves, or in abandoned houses. Domestic animals, such as dogs and cats, are frequently consumed. The size of the prey item increases as it ages.

Boa imperator, like other Boa species, are crepuscular ambush predators. They use constriction as the primary means of incapacitating their prey.

== Captivity ==
Boa imperator is one of the most common snakes kept in captivity; this is mainly due to their calm dispositions, impressive size potential and variety of color and pattern choices. Captive common boas also often tolerate being handled for extended periods. Captive B. imperator are generally fed frozen, thawed, pre-killed rodents or chicks—depending on the size of the snake in question—in an effort to avoid exposing the snake to potential injury or infection from a live prey animal. While some handlers and keepers may prefer to offer live prey, under careful supervision, any live rodent or bird could potentially fight back and injure the snake, if not subdued quickly. Furthermore, live prey, rather than frozen, carries the risk of internal parasites being transferred to the snake upon digestion. In addition to these health and safety concerns, frozen and thawed prey is also considered to be more ethical and humane for the prey animal itself.

This snake species has been a common species in the global pet trade since the 1980s, with 115,131 individuals being exported between 1989 and 2000. Wild-caught specimens are often illegally captured and highly stressed, as they are unceremoniously packed into shipping containers with other snakes—and sometimes other species of reptiles. Many individuals simply perish in-transit from the stress of being in a confined space with other snakes after being captured; survivors will often arrive in North America, Europe, and other markets infested with wild parasites, both internal and external. The most common parasite is Ophionyssus natricis, or the "reptile mite", in addition to ticks and parasitic worms. However, with decades of captive and selective breeding having been undertaken globally, hand-reared and healthy snakes are widely available (and superior specimens in many ways), thus reducing the strain on wild populations.

In addition to breeding for temperament, sociability and health, Boa imperator breeders will also often breed for a specific color pattern, or "morph", based on unique genetic expressions. There are many unique color and pattern morphs available in the pet trade.
