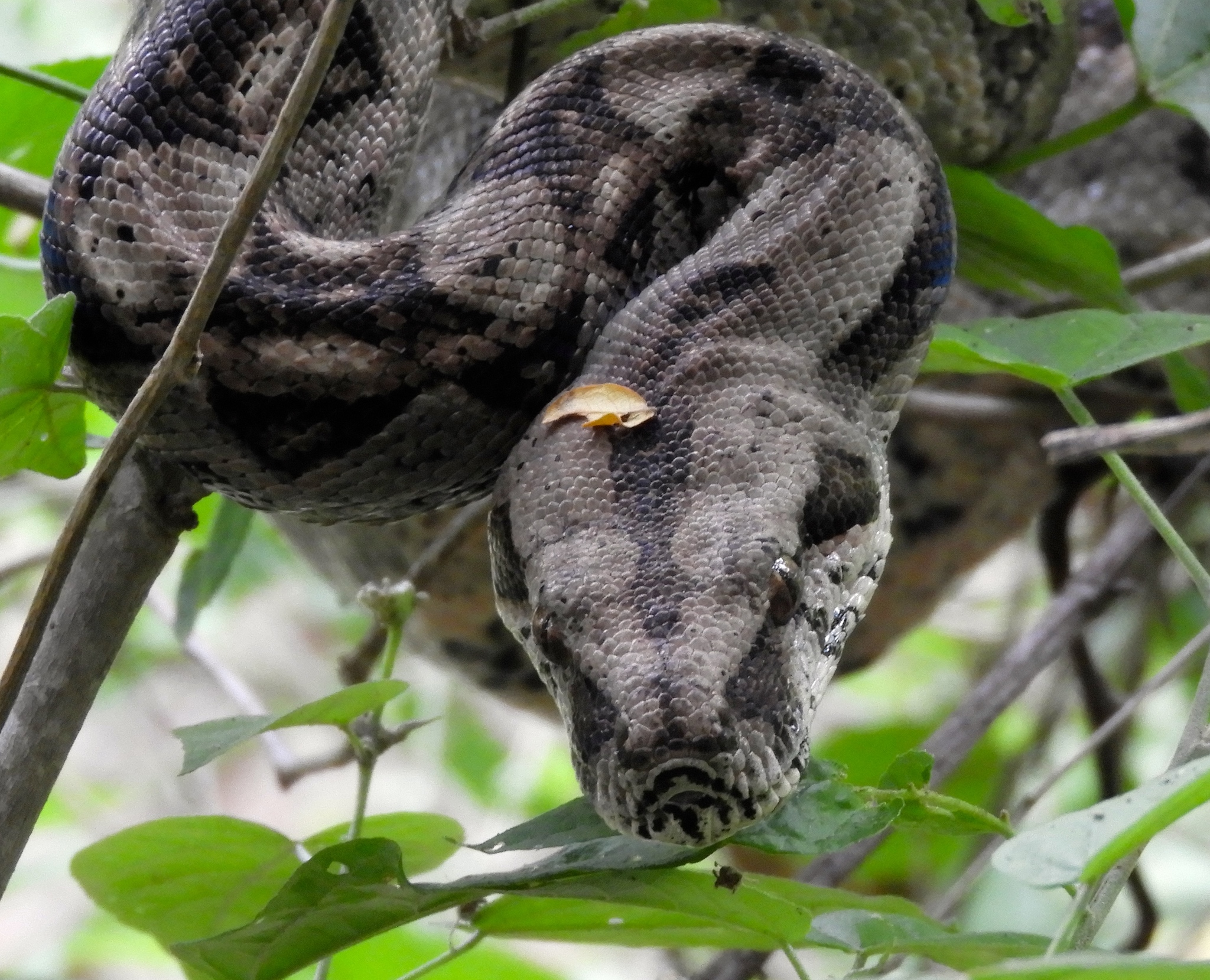

Conservation status
- CITES Appendix II

Scientific classification
- Kingdom: Animalia
- Phylum: Chordata
- Class: Reptilia
- Order: Squamata
- Suborder: Serpentes
- Family: Boidae
- Genus: Boa
- Species: B. sigma

Binomial name
- Boa sigma (Smith, 1943)
- Distribution range for Boa sigma

Synonyms
- Constrictor constrictor sigma Smith, 1943

= Boa sigma =

Species of snake

Boa sigma, known commonly as the Mexican west coast boa constrictor or Bateman’s Boa, is a species of snake in the family Boidae. The species is endemic to western Mexico. Boa sigma has previously been regarded as conspecific with Boa constrictor, and later with Boa imperator; however, in 2016, it was suggested on genetic grounds that Boa sigma should be regarded as a separate species.

== Taxonomy ==
Boa sigma was originally described as Constrictor constrictor sigma by Hobart Muir Smith in 1943. The subspecies only included snakes from the Islas Marías, and it did not receive wide recognition; instead, it was synonymized with the mainland subspecies Boa constrictor imperator by many authors.

In the 21st century, genetic studies revealed that Boa constrictor is a species complex. First, Boa constrictor imperator was elevated to species level, but it was soon recognized that there was another species nested within the new species Boa imperator. According to Card et al. (2016), the name Boa sigma is available for this third species. However, further research is needed because the genetic study of Card et al. didn't include samples from the Islas Marías, from where the holotype and the paratypes were collected. Despite this uncertainty, Boa sigma has been widely accepted as a valid species.

=== Phylogeny ===
Suárez-Atilano et al. (2014) identified two lineages of Boa imperator with a divergence date of about 5.2 Ma. However, Card et al. (2016) found the divergence date of these lineages, which they recognized as Boa imperator and Boa sigma, to be around 14 Ma. Both divergence dates could be explained with the rise of biogeographical barriers.

== Distribution and habitat ==
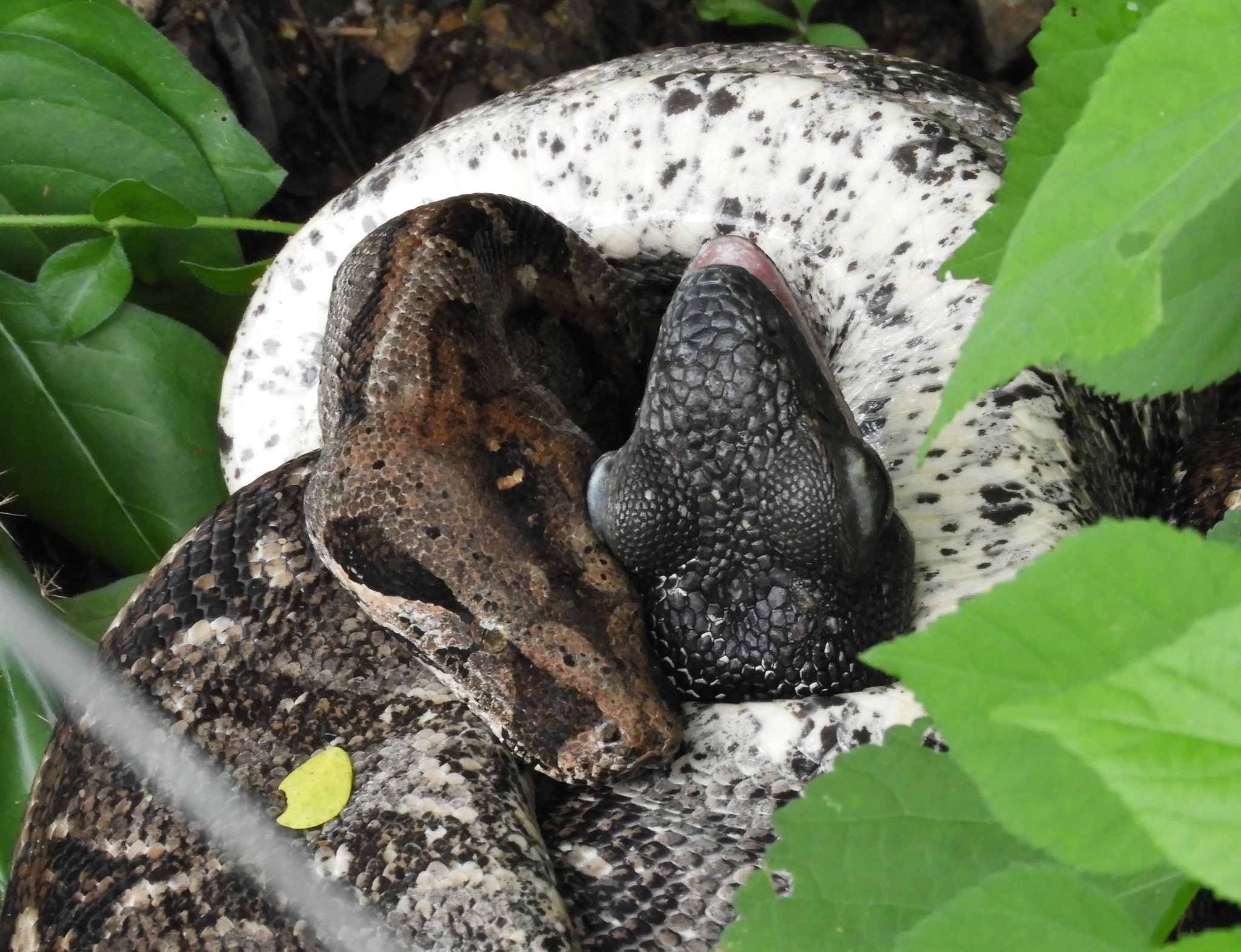
Preying on a western spiny-tailed iguana

Boa sigma is distributed along the Pacific Coast of Mexico west of the Isthmus of Tehuantepec. The northernmost records are from Sonora, where the species can reach altitudes of 1,420 metres (4,659 ft). Within the distribution range of Boa sigma, the three islands of the Islas Marías are included: María Madre, María Magdalena and María Cleofas.

Based on species distribution modelling, Boa sigma lives mainly within the tropical dry forest ecoregion, whereas Boa imperator seems to prefer areas with more precipitation. In Oaxaca, there is a contact zone between these two species, but it is unclear whether or not hybridization occurs there.

== Folklore ==
In eastern and southern Sonora, it is widely believed that Boa sigma, locally known as corúa, corúga, corúva, culebrón or limacoa, is the guardian of water (guardiana del agua). Unlike other snakes, Boa sigma is protected by rural Sonorans, because it is thought that killing the boa would cause the spring (aguaje) to dry up.
