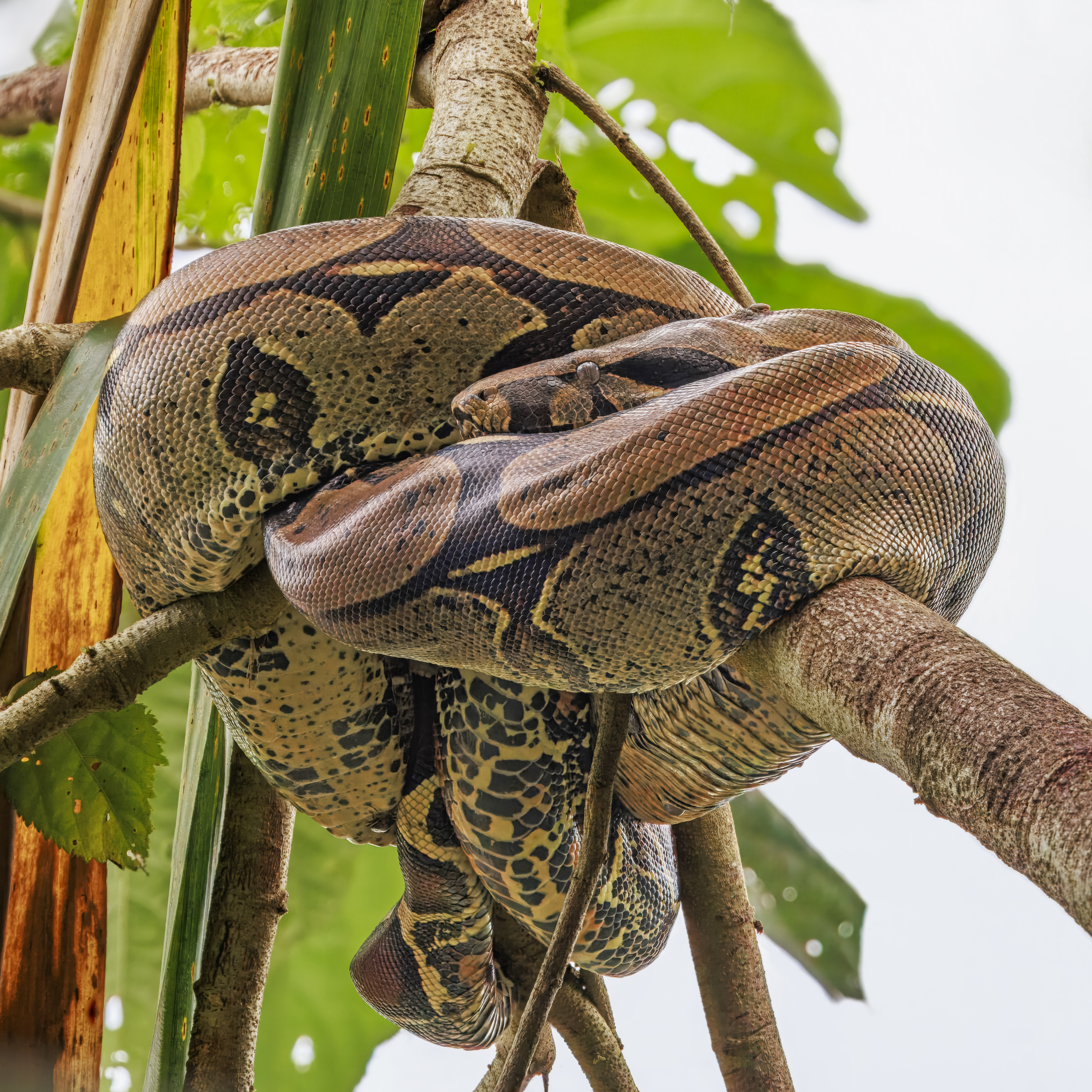
- Red-tailed boa (B. c. constrictor) in Ecuador

Conservation status
- Least Concern (IUCN 3.1)
- CITES Appendix II (Note: Except B. c. occidentalis, which is included in Appendix I)

Scientific classification
- Kingdom: Animalia
- Phylum: Chordata
- Class: Reptilia
- Order: Squamata
- Suborder: Serpentes
- Family: Boidae
- Genus: Boa
- Species: B. constrictor

Binomial name
- Boa constrictor Linnaeus, 1758
- Distribution

Synonyms
- [Boa] Constrictor Linnaeus, 1758; Constrictor formosissimus Laurenti, 1768; Constrictor rex serpentum Laurenti, 1768; Constrictor auspex Laurenti, 1768; Constrictor diviniloquus Laurenti, 1768; [Boa] constrictrix — Schneider, 1801; Boa diviniloqua — A.M.C. Duméril & Bibron, 1844; Boa constrictor — Boulenger, 1893; Boa diviniloqua — Boulenger, 1893; Constrictor constrictor — Griffin, 1916; Constrictor constrictor constrictor — Stull, 1935; Boa constrictor constrictor — Forcart, 1951

= Boa constrictor =

Species of snake

The boa constrictor (scientific name also Boa constrictor), also known as the common boa, is a species of large, non-venomous, heavy-bodied snake that is frequently kept and bred in captivity. The boa constrictor is a member of the family Boidae. The species is native to tropical South America. A staple of private collections and public displays, its color pattern is highly variable yet distinctive. Four subspecies are recognized.

== Common names ==
Though all boids are indeed constrictors, only Boa constrictor (and its subspecies) is commonly referred to in English as a boa constrictor—the only case of a living animal species being referred to colloquially using its scientific binomial name.

The species and subspecies of B. constrictor are part of a variable, diverse group of New World boids referred to as "red-tailed" boas, comprising the species Boa constrictor and Boa imperator. Within the exotic pet trade, it is known as a "BCC"—an abbreviation of its name—to distinguish it from other boa species, such as Boa imperator ("BCI", for "boa constrictor imperator").

Other regional names include the chij-chan (Mayan), jiboia (Portuguese), dagwe (Sranan Tongo), and macajuel (Trinidadian).

== Subspecies ==
Several subspecies of Boa constrictor have been described in the past, but many of these are poorly differentiated, and further research may redefine many of them. Some appear to be based more on location rather than on biological differences. Boa imperator, Boa nebulosa, Boa orophias and Boa sigma have all been elevated to full species status.

Scientific name	Taxon author	Common name	Geographic range	Etymology
B. c. constrictor	Linnaeus, 1758	red-tailed boa constrictor or red-tailed boa	South America except for the ranges of the other three subspecies	
B. c. longicauda	Price & Russo, 1991	long-tailed boa constrictor or long-tailed boa	northern Peru	
B. c. occidentalis	Philippi, 1873	Argentine boa constrictor or Argentine boa	Argentina and Paraguay	
B. c. ortonii	Cope, 1878	Orton's boa constrictor or Orton's boa	northwestern Peru	The subspecific name ortonii is in honor of American naturalist James Orton.

Several other subspecies have been described at different times, but currently, these are no longer considered to be valid subspecies by many herpetologists and taxonomists. They include:

- B. c. amarali Stull, 1932
- B. c. melanogaster Langhammer, 1983: a nomen dubium

== Description ==
=== Size and weight ===
The boa constrictor is a large snake, although it is only modestly sized in comparison to other large snakes, such as the reticulated python, Burmese python, or the occasionally sympatric green anaconda, and can reach lengths from 3 to 13 ft (0.91 to 3.96 m) depending on the locality and the availability of suitable prey. Clear sexual dimorphism is seen in the species, with females generally being larger in both length and girth than males. The usual size of mature female boas is between 7 and 10 ft (2.1 and 3.0 m) whereas males are between 6 and 8 ft (1.8 and 2.4 m). Females commonly exceed 10 ft (3.0 m), particularly in captivity, where lengths up to 12 ft (3.7 m) or even 14 ft (4.3 m) can be seen. The largest documented non-stretched dry skin is deposited at Zoologische Staatssammlung München (ZSM 4961/2012) and measures 14.6 ft (4.5 m) without head. A report of a boa constrictor growing up to 18.5 ft (5.6 m) was later found to be a misidentified green anaconda.

The boa constrictor is a heavy-bodied snake, and large specimens can weigh up to 27 kg (60 lb). Females, the larger sex, more commonly weigh 10 to 15 kg (22 to 33 lb). Some specimens of this species can reach or possibly exceed 45 kg (100 lb), although this is not usual.

The size and weight of a boa constrictor depends on subspecies, locale, and the availability of suitable prey. B. c. constrictor reaches, and occasionally tops, the averages given above, as it is one of the relatively large subspecies of Boa constrictor.

Other examples of sexual dimorphism in the species include males generally having longer tails to contain the hemipenes and also longer pelvic spurs, which are used to grip and stimulate the female during copulation. Pelvic spurs are the only external sign of the rudimentary hind legs and pelvis and are seen in all boas and pythons.

=== Coloring ===
The coloring of boa constrictors can vary greatly depending on the locality. However, they are generally a brown, gray, or cream base color, patterned with brown or reddish-brown "saddles" that become more pronounced towards the tail. This coloring gives B. constrictor subspecies the common name of "red-tailed boas." The coloring works as a very effective camouflage in the jungles and forests of its natural range.

Some individuals exhibit pigmentary disorders, such as albinism. Although these individuals are rare in the wild, they are common in captivity, where they are often selectively bred to make a variety of different color "morphs". Boa constrictors have an arrow-shaped head with very distinctive stripes on it: One runs dorsally from the snout to the back of the head; the others run from the snout to the eyes and then from the eyes to the jaw.

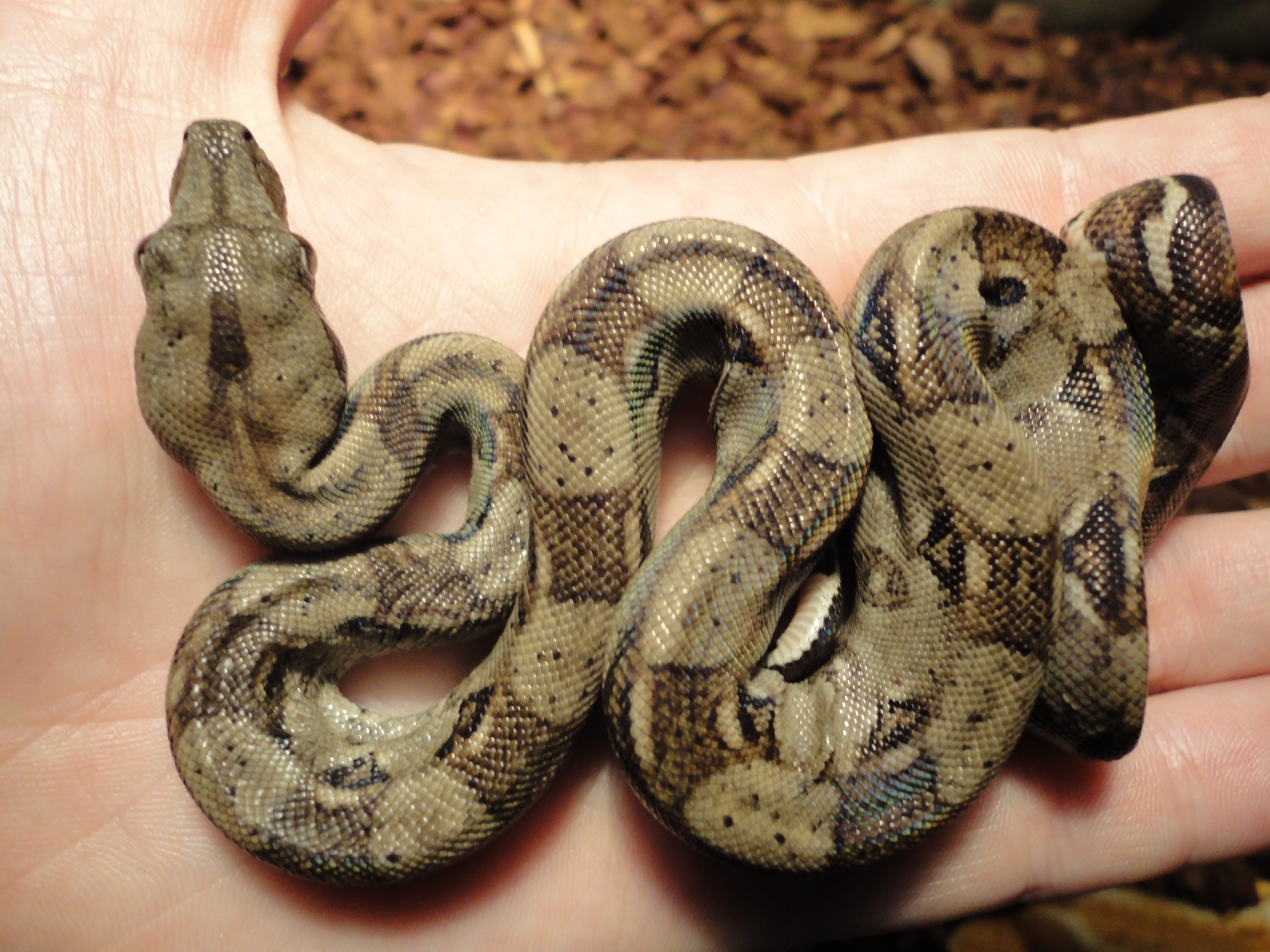
A juvenile South American boa constrictor

Boa constrictors can sense heat via cells in their lips, though they lack the labial pits surrounding these receptors seen in many members of the family Boidae. Boa constrictors also have two lungs, a smaller (non-functional) left and an enlarged (functional) right lung to better fit their elongated shape, unlike many colubrid snakes, which have completely lost the left lung.

== Distribution and habitat ==
Depending on the subspecies, Boa constrictor can be found through South America north of 35°S (Colombia, Ecuador, Peru, Venezuela, Trinidad and Tobago, Guyana, Suriname, French Guiana, Brazil, Bolivia, Uruguay, and Argentina), and many other islands along the coasts of South America. Introduced populations exist in Cozumel, extreme southern Florida, and St. Croix in the U.S. Virgin Islands. The type locality given is "Indiis"—a mistake, according to Peters and Orejas-Miranda (1970).

B. constrictor flourishes in a wide variety of environmental conditions, from tropical rainforests to arid semidesert country. However, it prefers to live in rainforest due to the humidity and temperature, natural cover from predators, and vast amount of potential prey. It is commonly found in or along rivers and streams, as it is a very capable swimmer. Boa constrictors also occupy the burrows of medium-sized mammals, where they can hide from potential predators.

== Behavior ==
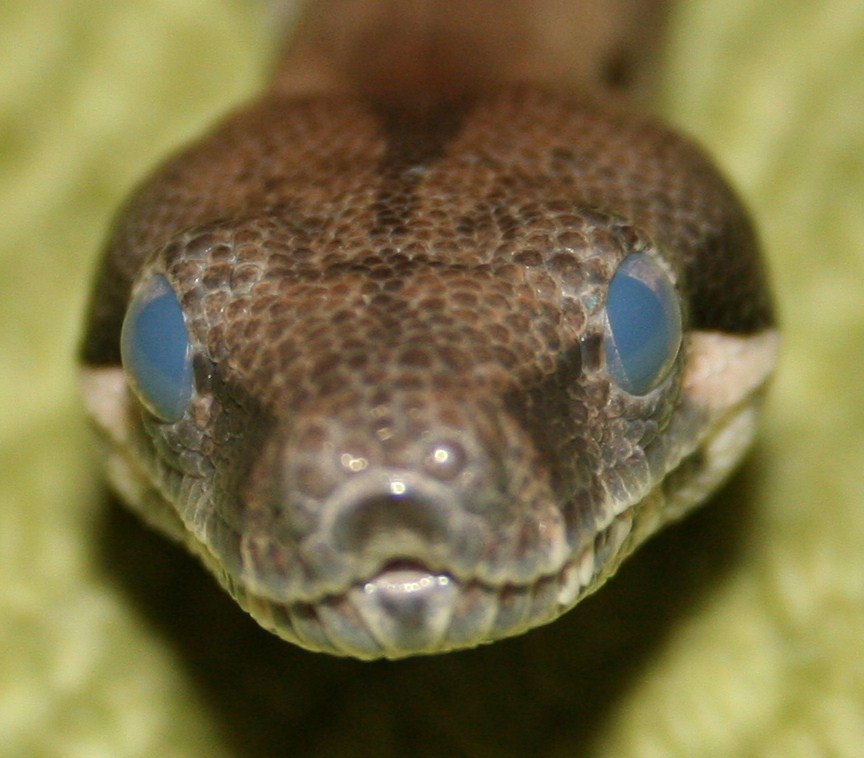
A juvenile female boa constrictor in a shed cycle, indicated by the blue opaque eyes

Boa constrictors generally live on their own and do not interact with any other snakes unless they want to mate. They are nocturnal, but they may bask during the day when night-time temperatures are too low. As semi-arboreal snakes, young boa constrictors may climb into trees and shrubs to forage; however, they become mostly terrestrial as they become older and heavier. Boa constrictors strike when they perceive a threat. Their bite can be painful, especially from large snakes, but is rarely dangerous to humans. Specimens from Central America are more irascible, hissing loudly and striking repeatedly when disturbed, while those from South America tame down more readily. Like all snakes, boa constrictors in a shed cycle are more unpredictable, because the substance that lubricates between the old skin and the new makes their eyes appear milky, blue, or opaque so that the snake cannot see very well, causing it to be more defensive than it might otherwise be.

=== Hunting and diet ===
A captive boa constrictor strike-feeding on a large (already dead) rat

Their prey includes a wide variety of small to medium-sized mammals and birds. The bulk of their diet consists of rodents (such as squirrels, mice, rats and agoutis), but frogs, larger lizards (such as ameivas, iguanas and tegus) and mammals as big as monkeys, marsupials (opossums), introduced mongooses, armadillos, wild pigs, young brocket deer and ocelots are also reported to have been consumed. Domestic animals such as dogs, cats, rabbits, ducks and chickens are frequently consumed. Young boa constrictors eat small mice, birds, bats, lizards, and amphibians. The size of the prey item increases as they get older and larger. Once a boa constrictor has caught its prey, it will wrap its coils around the animal and constrict it until it dies by asphyxiation. The boa's powerful muscles allow it to exert a great deal of pressure, and the prey is typically killed within a few minutes.

Boa constrictors are ambush predators, so they often lie in wait for an appropriate prey to come along, then they attack a moment before the prey can escape. However, they have also been known to actively hunt, particularly in regions with a low concentration of suitable prey, and this behavior generally occurs at night. The boa first strikes at the prey, grabbing it with its teeth; it then proceeds to constrict the prey until death before consuming it whole. Unconsciousness and death likely result from shutting off vital blood flow to the heart and brain, causing asphyxiation, rather than suffocation as was previously believed; constriction can interfere with blood flow and overwhelm the prey's usual blood pressure and circulation. This would lead to unconsciousness and death very quickly. Their teeth also help force the animal down the throat while muscles then move it toward the stomach. It takes the snake about 4–6 days to fully digest the food, depending on the size of the prey and the local temperature. After this, the snake may not eat for a week to several months, due to its slow metabolism.

=== Reproduction and development ===
The effects of central fusion and terminal fusion on heterozygosity

Boa constrictors are ovoviviparous, giving birth to live young. They generally breed in the dry season—between April and August—and are polygynous; thus, males may mate with multiple females. Half of all females breed in a given year, and a larger percentage of males actively attempt to locate a mate. Due to their polygynous nature, many of these males will be unsuccessful. As such, female boas in inadequate physical condition are unlikely to attempt to mate, or to produce viable young if they do mate. Reproduction in boas is almost exclusively sexual. In 2010, a boa constrictor was shown to have reproduced asexually via parthenogenesis. The Colombian rainbow boa (Epicrates maurus) was found to reproduce by facultative parthenogenesis resulting in production of WW female progeny. The WW females were likely produced by terminal automixis (see Figure), a type of parthenogenesis in which two terminal haploid products of meiosis fuse to form a zygote, which then develops into a daughter progeny. This is only the third genetically confirmed case of consecutive virgin births of viable offspring from a single female within any vertebrate lineage. In 2017, boa constrictors, along with Boa imperators and Burmese pythons, were found to contain a new set of sex determining chromosomes. Males were discovered to contain a pair of XY sex determining chromosomes, while females have a XX pair. This is the first time snakes were thought to contain male heterogamety; since then it has been found in ball pythons (Python regius) as well.

During the breeding season, the female boa constrictor emits pheromones from her cloaca to attract males, which may then wrestle to select one to breed with her. During breeding, the male curls his tail around the female's and the hemipenes (or male reproductive organs) are inserted. Copulation can last from a few minutes to several hours and may occur several times over a period of a few weeks. After this period, ovulation may not occur immediately, but the female can hold the sperm inside her for up to one year. When the female ovulates, a midbody swell can be noticed that appears similar to the snake having eaten a large meal. The female then sheds two to three weeks after ovulation, in what is known as a post-ovulation shed which lasts another 2–3 weeks, which is longer than a normal shed. The gestation period, which is counted from the postovulation shed, is around 100–120 days. The female then gives birth to young that average 15–20 in (38–51 cm) in length. The litter size varies between females but can be between 10 and 65 young, with an average of 25, although some of the young may be stillborn or unfertilized eggs known as "slugs". The young are independent at birth and grow rapidly for the first few years, shedding regularly (once every one to two months). At 3–4 years, boa constrictors become sexually mature and reach the adult size of 6–10 feet (1.8–3.0 m), although they continue to grow at a slow rate for the rest of their lives. At this point, they shed less frequently, about every 2–4 months.

== Captivity ==
Though still exported from South America in significant numbers, they are widely bred in captivity. Captive life expectancy is 20 to 30 years, with rare accounts of over 40 years. The greatest reliable age recorded for a boa constrictor in captivity is 40 years, 3 months, and 14 days. This boa constrictor was named Popeye and died in the Philadelphia Zoo, Pennsylvania, on April 15, 1977.

Up to 41.5% of captive boas test positive for eosinophilic inclusion bodies.

== Economic significance ==
Boa constrictors are very popular within the exotic pet trade and have been both captured in the wild and bred in captivity. Today, most captive boa constrictors are captive-bred, but between 1977 and 1983, 113,000 live boa constrictors were imported into the United States. These huge numbers of wild-caught snakes have put considerable pressure on some wild populations. Boa constrictors have also been hunted for their meat and skins, and are a common sight at markets within their geographic range. After the reticulated python, boa constrictors are the snake most commonly killed for snakeskin products, such as shoes, bags, and other items of clothing. In some areas, they have an important role in regulating the opossum populations, preventing the potential transmission of leishmaniasis to humans.

== Conservation ==
All boa constrictors fall under CITES and are listed under CITES Appendix II, except B. c. occidentalis, which is listed in CITES Appendix I.

In some regions, boa constrictor numbers have been severely hit by predation from humans and other animals and over-collection for the exotic pet and snakeskin trades. Most populations, though, are not under threat of immediate extinction; thus, they are within Appendix II rather than Appendix I.

== See also ==
- List of largest snakes
- Daletvirus boae
