= Frank Orton =

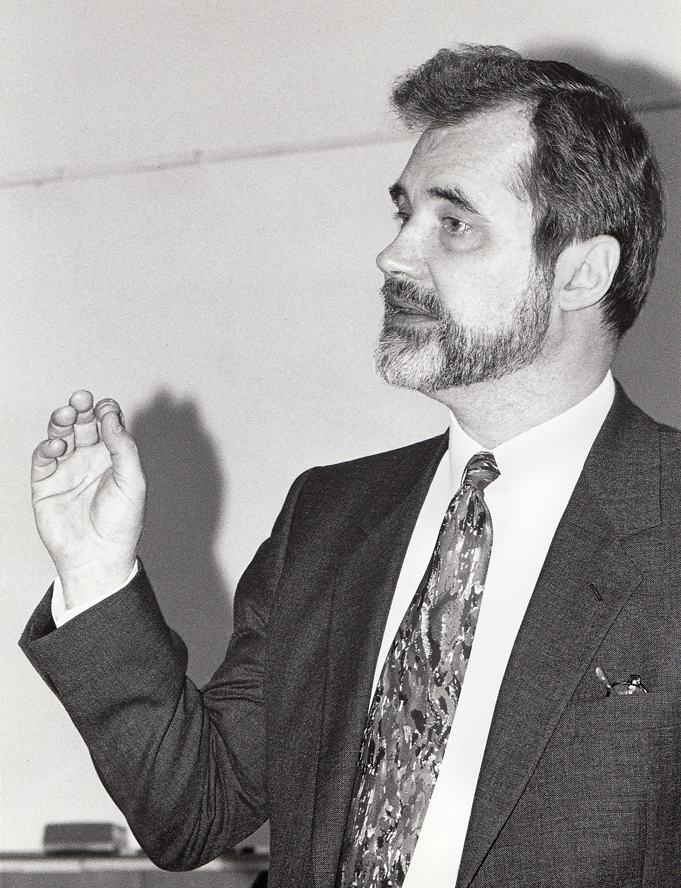
Frank Orton lectures during a seminar in Malmö 1994.

Frank Orton (born September 13, 1942, in Malmö, Sweden) is a Swedish lawyer and civil servant, who has been a Swedish Judge and The Discrimination Ombudsman (DO) of Sweden as well as The Human Rights Ombudsman of Bosnia and Herzegovina during almost four years.

== Biography ==
Orton graduated from high school in 1961 (Malmö Latinskola) and made his military service at The Army Language School in Uppsala, Sweden, 1961–62. He graduated from The University of Lund in 1968 and studied subsequently law at The University of California at Berkeley 1968–69. After serving as a law clerk at The City Court of Malmö, he became a law clerk at The Court of Appeals of Scania in 1973 and a junior judge at The City Court of Malmö in 1975. He was the legal secretary of a legal commission, which published the report Deprivation of Liberty in Cases of Disturbance and Drunkenness ("Frihetsberövande vid bråk och berusning", SOU 1982:66; ISBN 91-38-07209-2), a judge pro tem at The City Court of Lund in 1984 and a judge referee at the Supreme Court of Sweden 1985–1989, the latter three years as an inheritance and gift taxation cases expert. He became The Director of the Swedish Broadcasting Commission in 1989 and was The Swedish Discrimination Ombudsman (DO) from 1992 to 1998.

Orton has led a number of human rights projects for EU, OSCE, SIDA, UN and UNDP inter alia in Armenia, Georgia, Latvia, Namibia, Nicaragua, Paraguay, South Africa, Turkey and The West Bank with Gaza. He was 1994 -1998 the first President of The European Commission against Racism and Intolerance (ECRI) of The Council of Europe and 1993 -1998 one of the two European members of The UN International Coordinating Committee (ICC) of National Human Rights Institutions (NHRI). He was The Human Rights Ombudsman of Bosnia and Herzegovina from the spring of 2000 until 2004.

In 1998, assigned by UNHCHR Mary Robinson, Orton together with professor Leonard Joy studied as independent experts The UN Human Rights Center's activities concerning National Human Rights Institutions and published a report with proposals on measures to be taken. In 1999 Orton headed a group, assigned by The International Commission of Jurists in Geneva (ICJ) to study the independence of the Turkish judicial system, which published a thorough report.

In 2005, assigned by UNDP Armenia, he published a handbook for ombudsmen and civil servants, which is available on the Internet.

Orton has also published a number of articles in English on human rights and on the ombudsman institution.

Since 2007, Orton has been visiting professor at The Széchenyi István University in Hungary, where he was promoted to Honorary Doctor of Law in 2014.

Orton initiated in 2004 the establishing of The Frank Heller Society (Frank Heller-sällskapet) and since 2011, he is the Honorary President of this society. Since 2015, he is as well the President of The Heimdall Society (Sällskapet Heimdall) in Malmö.

== Family ==
Orton is the son of Army Major Bertel Orton (1915–1994) and the grandson of District Chief Judge Ivar Öhman (1868–1937).[8] Han was 1977–1983 married to Court of Appeals Judge Birgitta Orton Åqvist, född Bohman (1934–1995), with whom he has a daughter, Ebba Orton. Orton is a descendant of Consul Petter Olsson, Helsingborg (1830–1911), and since 2005 the President of The Consul P Olsson's Descendants' Family Association (Släktföreningen konsul P Olssons ättlingar).

== Bibliography (selections) ==
- 1991 – "Human Rights: How We Ought to Proceed” införd i The Iranian Journal of International Affairs, Vol. III, No 4, Winter 1991/92, s 749–752, (ISSN 1016-6130).
- 1993 – "Storsamhällets okunskap är samers värsta fiende" in Sameexistens samexistens, ed Göran Kristiansson, Stockholm: DO. 1996 – Mångfald lönar sig: om invandrare i arbetslivet. Stockholm:
- 1998 – "A new era for the Saami People of Sweden" in The Human Rights of Indigenous People, with Hugh Beach, ed Cynthia Price Cohen, p 91-107. ISBN 0-941320-93-6.
- 2000 – Hörnfeldt nr 1 – en släkt från Själevad. Stockholm.
- 2011 – Sigge och hans 1000 elever. Tolkskolan i Uppsala 1957–1989, ed with Sven-Ivan Sundqvist. Stockholm: SIS ägarservice. ISBN 978-91-977644-5-2
- 2012 – "Denna gyllene septemberlördag år 1912" in The Frank Heller Society Yearbook no 7, "Frank Heller på Rivieran", p 11-16. ISBN 978-91-976219-6-0.
- 2013 – "Frank Heller & Evert Taube. Några broderliga möten" in The Taube Society Yearbook 2013 Så blandar vi fredligt…, p 38-49. ISSN 1652-8514.
- 2014 – "Frank Hellers debut som författare" in Parnass 2014 no 4.
- 2014 – "Var håller storhertigen hus?" in The Frank Heller Society Yearbook no 9, Frank Heller och filmen, p 37-40. ISBN 978-91-976219-8-4.
- 2015 – "Resenären Frank Heller" in The Frank Heller Society Yearbook no 10, Reseskildraren Frank Heller, p 9-31. ISBN 978-91-976219-9-1.
- 2015 – "Frank Heller och inlandsbanan", in The Frank Heller Society Yearbook no 10, Reseskildraren Frank Heller, p 105-114. ISBN 978-91-976219-9-1.
