= Reginald Orton =

British surgeon

- Born: 27 January 1810; Surat, India
- Died: 1 September 1862 (aged 52); Bishopwearmouth, England
- Occupation: Surgeon

Reginald Orton (27 January 1810 – 1 September 1862) was a British surgeon.

== Biography ==
Orton was born at Surat, near Bombay, on 27 January 1810. He was the only son of James Orton, surgeon in the East India Company's service and inspector-general of Bombay hospitals, whose father, Reginald Orton, was rector of Hawksworth, near Richmond, Yorkshire. Reginald was educated at the grammar school, Richmond, under James Tate. He afterwards returned to Bombay, where he was bound apprentice to his father. He returned to England on the completion of his apprenticeship, entered at St. Thomas's Hospital as a medical student, and was admitted a member of the Royal College of Surgeons of England in 1833, and a licentiate of the Society of Apothecaries in the following year.

In 1834 he took charge of Mr. Fothergill's practice in Sunderland, purchased it, and in the same year married. He lived in Sunderland until shortly before his death, when he took a farm at Bishopwearmouth. He was surgeon to the Sunderland Eye Infirmary and consulting surgeon to the Seaham Infirmary.

Orton, although only locally conspicuous in his lifetime, brought about, by his energy, changes which affected the whole empire. Throughout his life he was a busy medical practitioner and an active reformer. Sunderland owes to his initiative its system of lighting by gas, its water-supply, its public baths, its library, and its institute. But his services were not confined to Sunderland. It was owing to his repeated protests, and to the public attention which he drew to the iniquity of taxing light and air, that the chancellor of the exchequer was at last obliged to repeal the duty which for many years had been levied upon glass and windows. Orton suggested to the government that, if light was still to be taxed, the duty should be regulated by the size of the panes, and not by the number of windows, as had hitherto been done; so that the wealthy and those who could afford large sheets of plateglass should pay more than their poorer neighbours. He also advocated the imposition of a moderate house duty, commencing at a certain rental, to make good the loss of revenue, if it was found that the duty could be entirely abolished. The latter scheme was eventually adopted. Orton also took a lively interest in maritime affairs, and turned his attention to the means and appliances for saving life at sea. He projected a new form of reel lifebuoy, and invented a lifeboat which was light, low in the water, open so that the sea passed through it (the crew being encased in waterproof bags), and practically incapable of being capsized; for these he took out a patent in 1845 (No. 10898). The boat was used on one or two occasions. Orton died on 1 September 1862 at Ford North Farm, Bishopwearmouth. He is buried in the cemetery of that town. He wrote no book; the ‘Essay on the Epidemic Cholera of India,’ London, 1831, 8vo, is by his uncle of the same name as himself.
