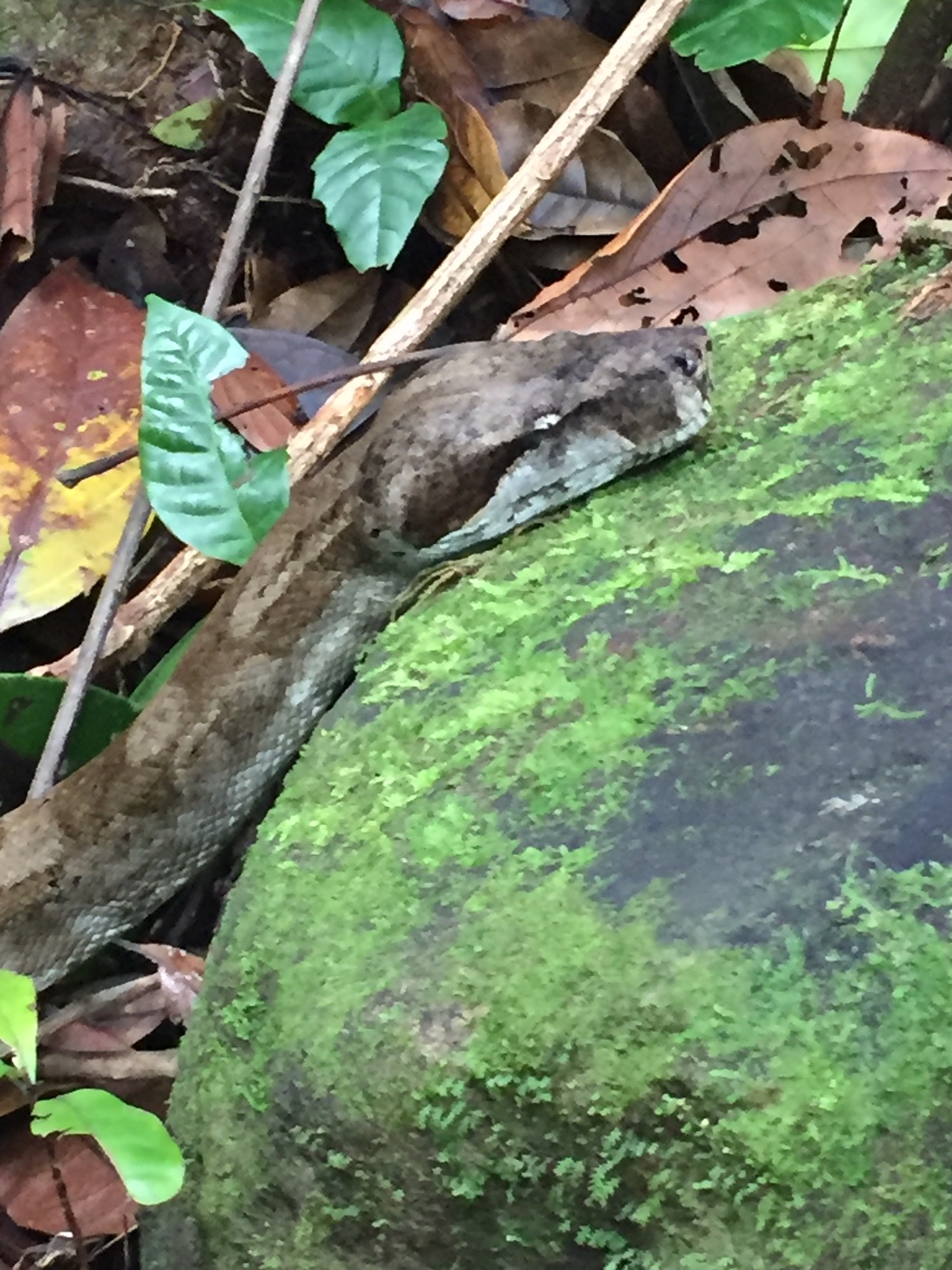

Conservation status
- Least Concern (IUCN 3.1)

Scientific classification
- Kingdom: Animalia
- Phylum: Chordata
- Class: Reptilia
- Order: Squamata
- Suborder: Serpentes
- Family: Boidae
- Genus: Boa
- Species: B. nebulosa

Binomial name
- Boa nebulosa (Lazell, 1964)

= Boa nebulosa =

Species of snake

Boa nebulosa, the Dominican boa, is a species of snake in the family Boidae. The species is endemic to Dominica.

== Diet ==
Boa nebulosa eats rodents, bats, iguanas and occasionally hens.
