= James Orton =

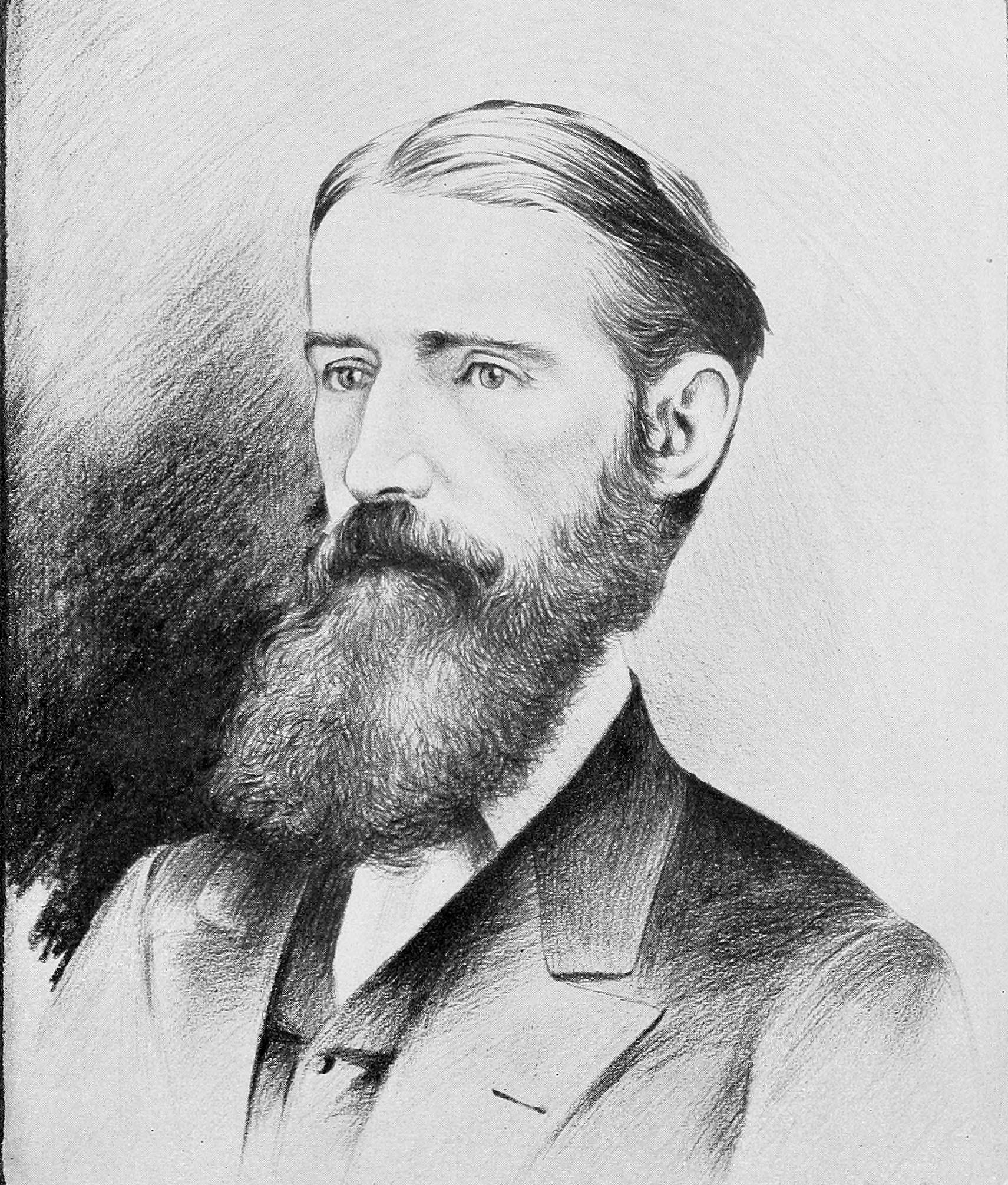
- Born: April 21, 1830; Seneca Falls, New York
- Died: September 25, 1877 (aged 47); Lake Titicaca, Peru
- Father: Azariah Giles Orton
- Scientific career
- Fields: Geology, Physical geography
- Institutions: University of Rochester, Vassar College

James Orton (21 April 1830, Seneca Falls, New York – 25 September 1877, Lake Titicaca, Peru) was an American naturalist who contributed much to the knowledge of South America and the Amazon basin.

== Biography ==
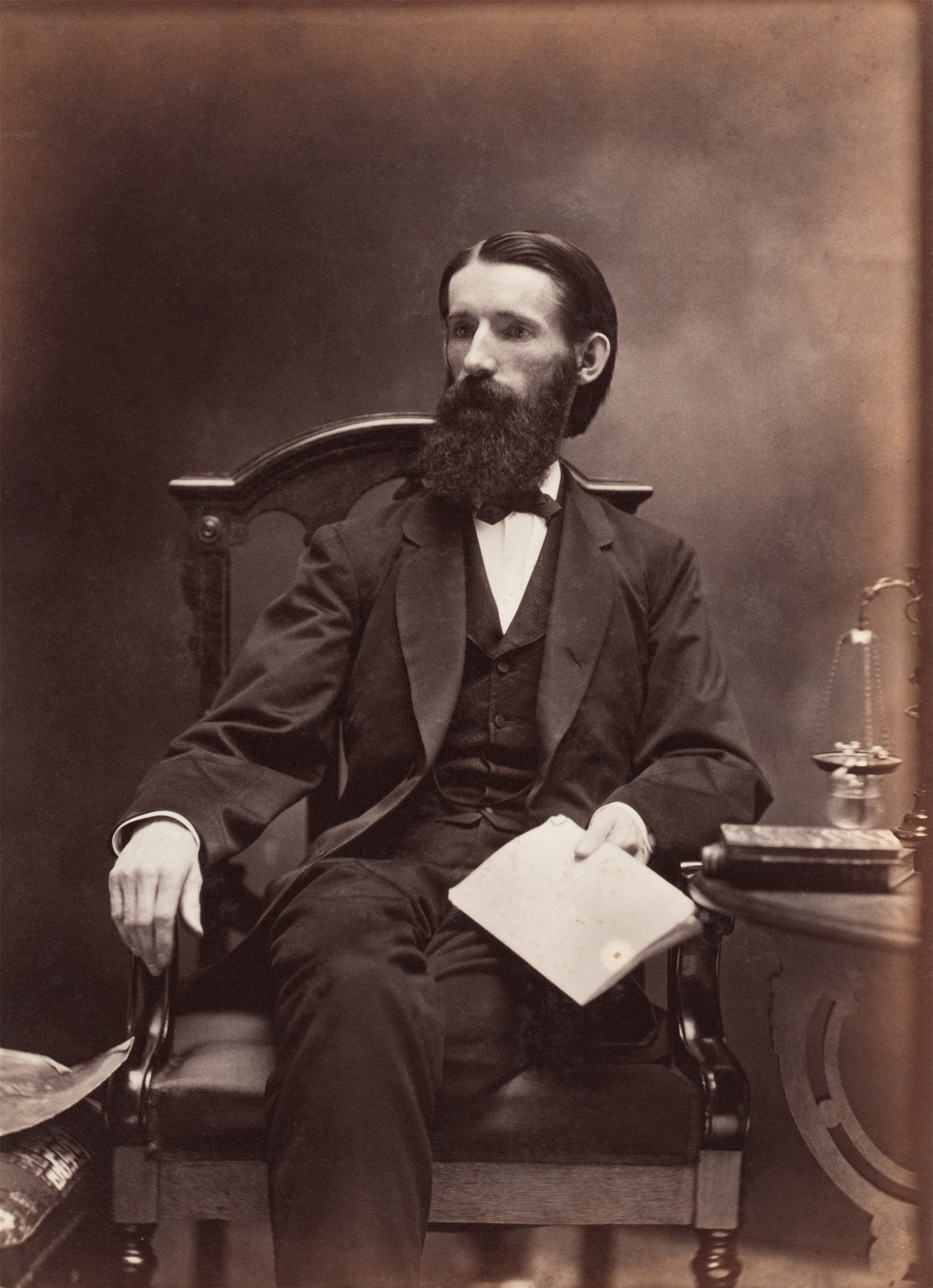
James Orton taken in William Notman's studio in Montreal in 1870.

Orton was the son of Presbyterian clergyman and theologian Azariah Giles Orton. Four of his seven brothers died in infancy, and the family's financial resources were very meager. Early in life he developed an interest in natural history and writing. Financial difficulties and poor health delayed his matriculation at Williams College, where he graduated in 1855. In 1858, he graduated from Andover Theological Seminary. After spending some time in travel in Europe and the East, he was ordained pastor of the Congregational Church in Greene, New York, on July 11, 1860. In 1861 he accepted a charge in Thomaston, Maine, where he remained until 1864, when he became pastor in Brighton, New York. He was appointed instructor in natural sciences in the University of Rochester in 1866, and in 1869 was appointed professor of natural history at Vassar College, which position he held until his death.

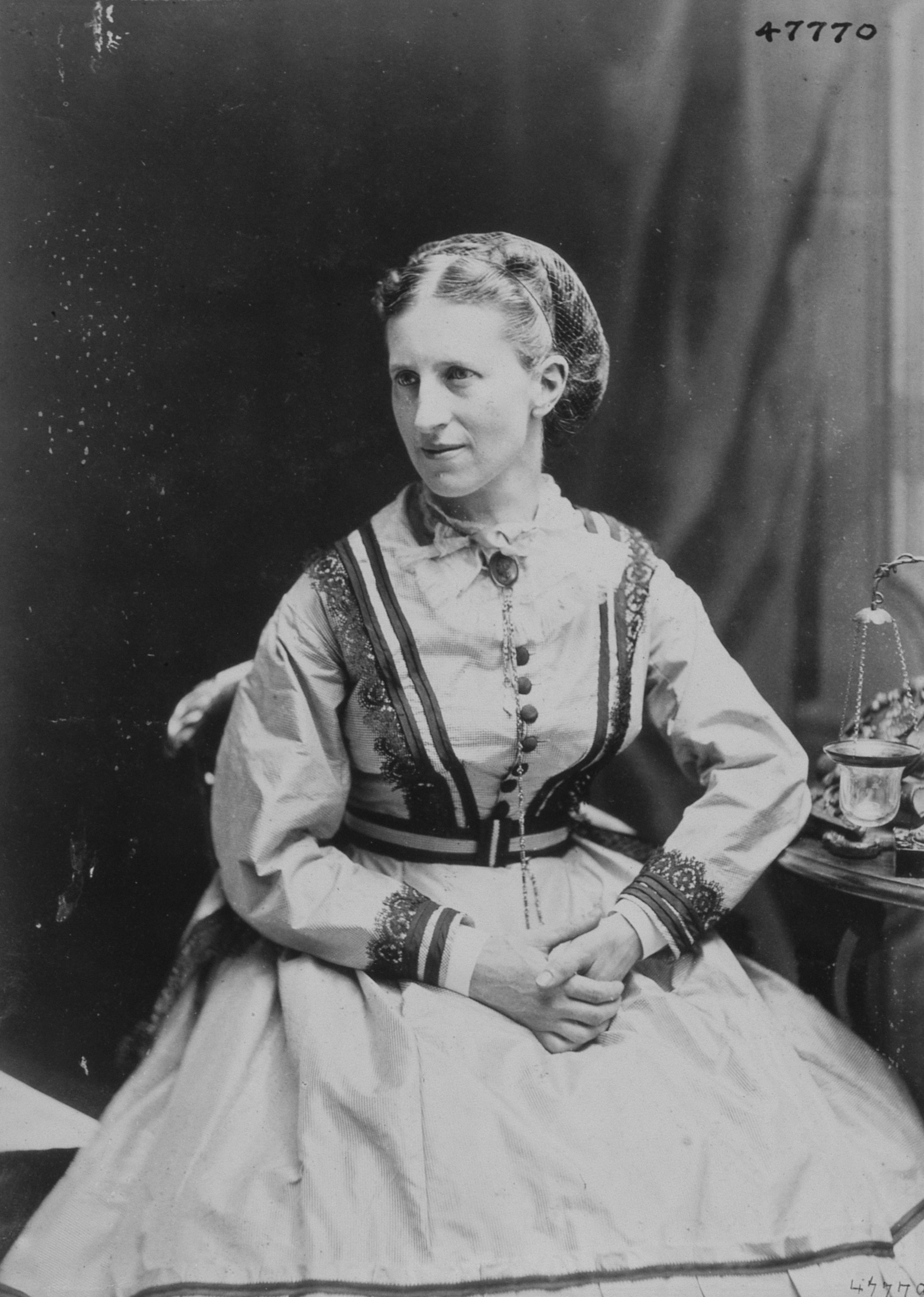
Mrs. James Orton taken in William Notman's studio in Montreal in 1870.

In 1867 Orton visited South America at the head of an expedition of students that were sent out under the auspices of Williams College. On this occasion, he crossed the continent by way of Quito, the Napo River, and the Amazon, discovering the first fossils that were found in the valley of the latter river. He made a second journey in 1873, and crossed from Pará, by way of the Amazon, to Lima and Lake Titicaca. In 1876 he undertook the exploration of the Beni River, which carries the waters of eastern Bolivia to the Amazon by way of the Madeira River, and he died on this journey during the passage of Lake Titicaca, on his way to Puno.

Orton was regarded as the best authority on the subject of the geology and physical geography of the west coast of South America and the Amazon valley. No one since the time of Alexander von Humboldt had contributed so much to the exact knowledge of this region. He was a member of scientific societies in the United States and in Europe, whose transactions he enriched with papers on the natural history of South America.

== Eponyms ==
Two South American reptiles are named in his honor: Anolis ortonii and Boa constrictor ortonii.

== Works ==
His works include:

- Miners' Guide and Metallurgists' Directory (New York, 1849)
- The Proverbalist and the Poet (Philadelphia, 1852)
- The Andes and the Amazon (New York, 1870; 3rd ed. 1876)
- Underground Treasures: How and Where to Find Them. A Key for the Ready Determination of All the Useful Minerals Within the United States (Hartford, 1872)
- The liberal education of women: the demand and the method. Current thoughts in America and England(New York, 1873)
- Comparative Zoology, structural and systematic (1875)
