= Azariah Giles Orton =

American theologian

Azariah Giles Orton (August 6, 1789 – December 28, 1864), was an American theologian.

== Biography ==
Orton was born in Tyringham, Berkshire County, Massachusetts on August 6, 1789. He was graduated at Williams in 1813, and at Princeton Theological Seminary in 1820.

On completing his theological course he was commissioned by the board of missions of the Presbyterian assembly "to preach to destitute places in Georgia". In 1822 he was ordained pastor of the Presbyterian church at Seneca Falls, New York, where he remained until 1835. After preaching three years at Lisle, New York, he accepted a call from a Congregational church at Greene, New York, which connection he maintained from 1838 till 1852. He then returned to Lisle, and labored there until 1860.

He received the degree of D. D. from the University of the City of New York in 1849 and from Union College in 1850. In 1838 he published a reply to Professor Moses Stuart on the constitution of the United States in its relation to slavery. In 1842 he prepared the memorial of Chenango County, New York, to the state senate, praying that the bill for the abolition of capital punishment might not become a law, by the timely reception of which the final passage of the bill was prevented. He was also the author of an article on the Scripture argument for capital punishment, parts of which were printed in the "Genesee Evangelist" of 1849. In 1854 he delivered an address at Miami university on "Nature and Revelation", which was published. He also was the author of several poems. He was a man of profound scholarship. He died in Lisle, Broome County, New York, 28 December 1864.

== Family ==
Orton's son, James (1830–1877), was a notable naturalist.
