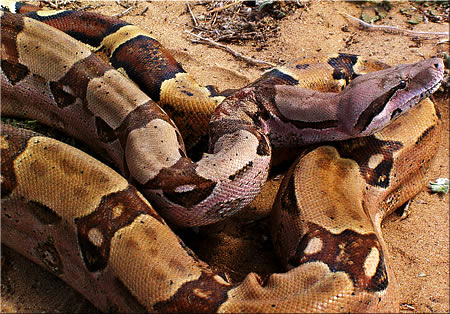
- Boa constrictor, B. constrictor

Scientific classification
- Kingdom: Animalia
- Phylum: Chordata
- Class: Reptilia
- Order: Squamata
- Suborder: Serpentes
- Family: Boidae
- Subfamily: Boinae
- Genus: Boa; Linnaeus, 1758

Type species
- Boa constrictor Linnaeus, 1758

= Boa (genus) =

Boa Temporal range: Paleogene-Recent (Eocene to Holocene), 41.3–0 Ma

Genus of snakes

Boa is a genus of boas found in Mexico, the Caribbean, and Central and South America. Six extant species, and one extinct, are currently recognized.

== Etymology ==
The Online Etymology Dictionary says that the word comes from the "late 14c., "large snake", from Latin boa, type of large serpent mentioned in Pliny's "Natural History;" origin unknown (in medieval folk etymology the name was associated with Greek bous "ox")." There might be a connection to the Albanian word bollë, from proto-Albanian *bālwā, meaning any of various nonvenomous snakes of the families Colubridae family, Boidae family or a kuçedër's early form.

== Species ==
List of Boa species
Image	Scientific name	Common name	Subspecies (not including nominate subspecies)	Distribution
	Boa constrictor	Boa constrictor or red-tailed boa	3	South America (except Chile and a small part of the northwest)
	Boa imperator	Central American boa, northern boa or Colombian boa	1	Mexico, Central America and a small part of northwestern South America
	Boa nebulosa	Dominican boa	0	Dominica
	Boa orophias	St. Lucia boa or San Lucia boa	0	Saint Lucia
	Boa sigma	Mexican west coast boa	0	western Mexico
	Boa blanchardensis †	Marie-Galante boa	0	Marie-Galante (extinct)
	Boa atlantica	Jibóia-da-mata-atlântica	0	Brazil

== Distribution and habitat ==
Boa species are found in northern Mexico through Central America (Belize, Guatemala, Honduras, El Salvador, Nicaragua, Costa Rica and Panama) to South America north of 35°S (Colombia, Ecuador, Peru, Venezuela, Guyana, Suriname, French Guiana, Brazil, Bolivia, Uruguay and Argentina). One species is present in the Lesser Antilles (Dominica and St. Lucia), on San Andrés, Providencia and many other islands along the Caribbean coasts of Mexico and Central and South America.

== Taxonomy ==
Kluge (1991) moved the genera Sanzinia and Acrantophis into Boa, based on a phylogeny derived from morphological characters. However, it has since been shown that the Malagasy boids and Boa constrictor do not form a monophyletic group, and the lumping of Sanzinia, Acrantophis and Boa was, therefore, an error. These snakes are therefore correctly represented in their own genera: Sanzinia and Acrantophis.

To add further to the naming confusion, many species of snake in the family Boidae are known colloquially as "boas". Also, four subspecies of B. constrictor are recognized, each with a distinct common name.
