= Grigg (disambiguation) =

Grigg is a surname.

Grigg may also refer to:

- Grigg (crater), lunar crater on the far side of the Moon
- Grigg Peak, 2130 metres high, 13 km west of the Lyttelton Range in the Admiralty Mountains of Victoria Land, Antarctica
- Grigg Motor and Engineering, historic British manufacturer of scooters and motorcycles

== See also ==
- Comet Grigg-Skjellerup, a periodic comet
- Griggs (disambiguation)
- Grieg (disambiguation)
- Greig (disambiguation)
