= Grigg =

Grigg is a surname. Notable people with the surname include:

- Edward Grigg, 1st Baron Altrincham (1879–1955), British colonial administrator and politician
- John Grigg (1924–2001), British writer, historian and politician
- Stevan Eldred-Grigg (born 1952), New Zealand author of novels, history books, essays and short stories
- Albert Grigg (born 1873), Ontario merchant and political figure
- Allan Grigg, also known as Kool Kojak, multi-platinum Brazilian-American songwriter, producer, film director and artist
- Arthur Grigg (1896–1941), New Zealand politician of the National Party
- Bob Grigg (1924–2002), British designer of the British Aerospace 146
- Cecil Grigg (1891–1968), American football player
- Charles Grigg, former comic artist for DC Thomson
- Charles Leiper Grigg (1868–1948), the inventor of 7 Up in 1929
- Chubby Grigg (1926–1983), American football tackle
- Dick Grigg (1884–1972), Australian rules footballer
- Eliza Grigg, New Zealand alpine ski racer
- Etta Grigg (1880–1945), South Australian viola player
- John Grigg (astronomer) (1838–1920), New Zealand astronomer
- John Grigg (New Zealand politician) (1828–1901), 19th century Member of Parliament in Canterbury, New Zealand
- Mary Grigg MBE (1897–1971), New Zealand politician of the National Party
- May Grigg (1885–1969), South Australian portrait painter
- Milton L. Grigg (1905–1982), Virginia architect known for restoration work at Colonial Williamsburg and Monticello
- P. J. Grigg (1890–1964), British civil servant who became Secretary of State for War during WWII
- Ron Grigg, British chemist, Professor of Organic Chemistry at the University of Leeds
- Russell Grigg (philosopher), Australian philosopher and psychoanalyst
- Shaun Grigg (born 1988), Australian rules footballer
- Simon Grigg (born 1955), New Zealand music businessman, writer, radio host, publisher, producer, DJ and archivist
- Thomas Grigg (politician) (1889–1969), Australian politician
- Thomas Grigg (musician) (1859–1944), South Australian violinist, teacher and conductor
- Will Grigg (born 1991), footballer
- William Norman Grigg (1963–2017), the author of several books from a Constitutionalist perspective

== See also ==
- Griggs (disambiguation)
- Grieg (disambiguation)
- Greig (disambiguation)
