= Fitch Lovell =

British Food processing, wholesaling and retailing conglomerate

Fitch Lovell plc
- Traded as: Public company
- Industry: Food manufacturer, wholesaler and retailer
- Founded: 1784
- Fate: Purchased and merged into Booker Group in 1991
- Headquarters: London, England
- Area served: United Kingdom
- Subsidiaries: Keevil and Keevil; Key Markets Supermarkets Ltd; Hales Trent Cakes; West Gunner Butchers; Huttons & Co Ltd; Jus-Rol; Jacksons of Piccadilly; Buckingham Foods; UYC; Bluecrest

Fitch Lovell was a British food manufacturing, transportation, distribution and retail conglomerate with origins dating back to 1784. The company was purchased by Booker Group in 1990 for £279.7 million and during 1991 the business was merged into its parent.

== Early history ==
Fitch & Co started out in 1784, when James Fitch (1762–1818) opened a cheesemaking business in Leadenhall, London near to St Katherine Cree church, which since 1965 has hosted the Fitch Gardens (paid for by Fitch Lovell).

During the 19th century Fitch & Son grew from being a cheesemaker to become a producer and provider of many food products, from cheese to bacon. In 1839 it had premises in 66 Bishopgate, 83 Leadenhall and 98 Union Street, London, while in 1846 it had further premises in 33 New Gloucester Street in Hoxton, 9 Coalville Terrace in Chelsea and 11 High Street, Newington Butts. It held several Royal Warrants, had expanded to provide livestock auctioning and by 1878 was providing dairy products nationwide.

== Incorporation and expansion ==
The company was incorporated as Fitch & Son Ltd in 1908, the same year that one of the families most famous members was born, the philanthropist Marc Fitch. In 1909 a fraud case was brought involving Fitch & Son at the Old Bailey. A former member of staff, Frederick Crocker, who had been dismissed by Edwin & Stanley Finch for reputedly using company funds to do his own business deals, was found guilty of purchasing lard from the Morris Beef Company using Fitch & Son paperwork and selling the goods on.

During the 1940s and 50s, the company grew further into different areas of the food industry. In 1941 it purchased Hales Home Bakery (Clevedon) Ltd from its owner Frank Hale. This was followed up by purchasing Far Famed Cake Company in 1950 from Meridith & Drew and the John Trent company in 1962, merging them to form Hales Trent Cakes in 1962.

It also expanded into the butchery market, first buying Keevil and Keevil, a Smithfield meat seller, before buying the Layton & Burkett group in 1950, and expanding the business by purchasing several other London butcher chains. Fitch & Co merged with Lovell & Christmas Ltd, Europe's most important dairy company in 1958 to form Fitch Lovell. By 1958 it had 49 butcher shops, and had purchased the West Butchers chain. This was in turn merged with the Gunner chain to form West Gunner (incorporated 1 June 1962) and had 250 shops.

In 1963, Fitch Lovell merged its purchased grocery store businesses of Green & Dyson (which had 147 shops), World Stores (which had 212 stores), Walkers and Hale & Partners to form its own supermarket chain, Key Markets (later part of Somerfield), as they saw this as the future of food retailing, opening many stores in the south and east of England. They expanded the business by buying up several rivals. In 1965 they bought Barrow Stores (based in Birmingham), which had been started by John Cadbury in 1824, and was merged into Key Markets in 1966. In 1972, they purchased the David Greig chain, which included the former Wrenson business.

== 1970s ==
During the 1970s the business expanded by purchasing Huttons & Co Ltd, a ship chandlers, food warehousing and transportation company, and building more Key Market stores. Hales Trent Cakes were sold in 1974 to J. Lyons and Co. In 1975 Fitch Lovell purchased the pastry firm Jus-Rol. The company expanded its product manufacturing by entering the burgeoning margarine market, in partnership with American firm Standard Brands.

During the 1970s, Key Markets became the second UK supermarket to market its own fuel, after Sainsbury's launched its own fuel product in 1974. Key Markets were also the first store in the UK to have a barcode scanner, launching the system in their store in Spalding, Lincolnshire in 1977. Unfortunately, no UK food manufacturer used barcodes on their products at the time, so the staff had to add the labels to each product for it to work. Key Markets also launched the Super Key brand for its larger stores, with its largest opening in Wisbech that had 410,000 sq. feet of sales space and parking for over 400 cars. It was during the 1970s that Fitch Lovell split their organisation into the retail and catering distribution business.

== 1980s and 1990s ==
In 1982, Linfood plc, later the Dee Corporation (Somerfield), made a takeover bid of £74 million for Fitch Lovell. The proposal was referred on 9 November 1982 to the Monopolies & Merger commission. Eventually Linfood purchased the 101 Key Market Stores in 1983 for £44.8 million, after a battle with Safeway and merged them with their Gateway business. Fitch Lovell sold West Gunner business to Vestey Group (Dewhurst) for £4m in 1984, although the chain now only had 100 stores.

With the finance raised from the sale of Key Markets, the West Gunner butcher shops, Favour Parker Poultry (£2.5 million), Marine Farming and animal feed firm Pilwood Feeds (for £2.5 million), Fitch Lovell purchased or created new business to grow its catering and production business. In 1985, it bought Jacksons of Piccadilly owners of purportedly the original 1830 recipe for Earl Grey tea and promptly sold them on to Twinings. In 1984, it set up Buckingham Foods as a sandwich manufacturer, while in 1988 it purchased UYC, a food services company from Guniness. In 1985, it also purchased the frozen fish group Bluecrest. In 1989, it was reported that Fitch Lovell had increased profit by 21%. Other Fitch Lovell business were Farmers Table Chicken (based in Witham, Essex), Blue Cap (contract distribution), Stocks Lovell (bacon supplier to supermarkets), Dixons (pork processing), Newforge Foods of Gateacre, Liverpool, who held the licence to produce SPAM in the UK as well as L Noels in Oswaldtwistle.

In the late 1980s Fitch Lovell moved into new headquarters at 83 Turnmill Street, London but when the company was sold to Booker plc in 1990, the building was sold to Corps of Commissionaires for £1.7 million.

Booker plc purchased the company in 1990 for £308 million, and completed the merger into its business by 1991. Several of the subsidiaries were sold off, including Miller-Robirch (Kerry Group) while several transportation depots were closed.
