= Greig =

Greig may refer to:

== People ==
- Greig (name)

== Places ==
=== United States ===
- Greig, New York, a town in Lewis County, New York
- Cape Greig in Alaska

=== Canada ===
- Greig Lake (Saskatchewan), a lake in Saskatchewan
- Greig Lake (Vancouver Island), a lake in British Columbia

== Other uses ==
- David Greig (supermarket), a former UK supermarket chain, now part of the Co-operative Group
- Greig cephalopolysyndactyly syndrome
- Greig City Academy

== See also ==
- Grieg (disambiguation)
