= Barrow's Stores =

Former department store in Birmingham

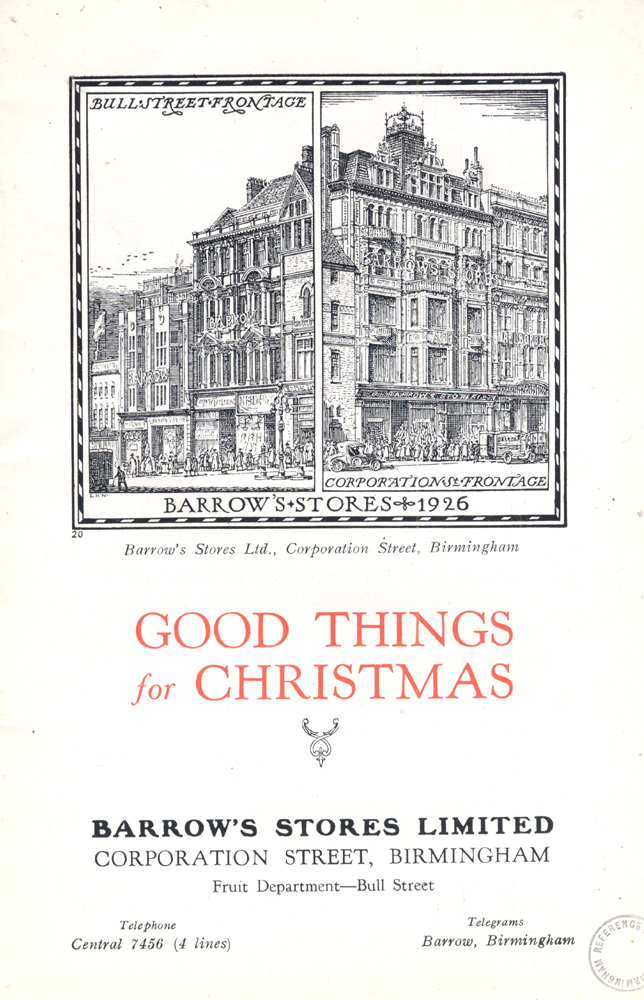
- 1926 Christmas catalogue, showing the Bull Street and Corporation Street frontages
- Industry: Retail
- Fate: Purchased by Fitch Lovell
- Successor: Key Markets
- Headquarters: Birmingham, England
- Products: Grocery and homeware

Barrow's Stores, also known as Barrow's, was an upmarket department store located in Birmingham, England. In the late 1950s, Barrow's Stores moved into the emerging supermarket business, and in 1964 was purchased by Fitch Lovell, the food distribution and manufacturing group, who eventually merged the business into their own chain, Key Markets.

== History ==
Barrow's Stores was originally started by Richard Cadbury, of the Cadbury family. Richard opened a small drapery store in 1794 in Bull Street. By 1824 the Cadbury family opened a new shop next door selling tea, coffee and cocoa.

However, in 1849 John Cadbury transferred the business to his cousin Richard Cadbury Barrow so they could concentrate on the manufacture of chocolate. The business was renamed Barrow's Stores.

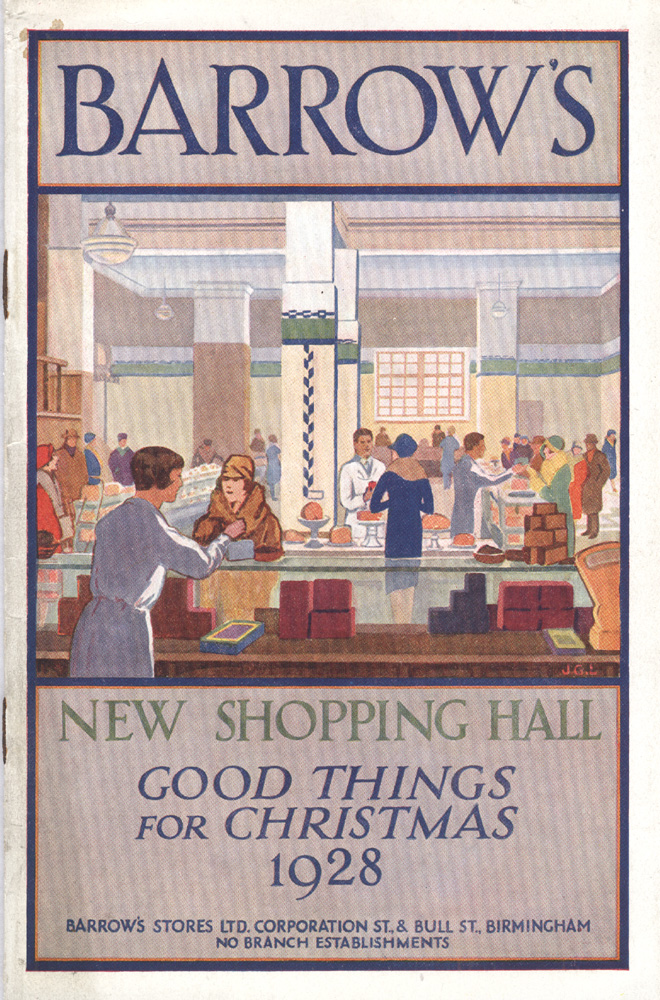
1928 Christmas Catalogue cover

By 1905 the store had been rebuilt with a new cafe on the first floor for the customers to try the company's products, and had numerous departments from glass & china to food. The business provided Christmas lists of goods available for customers to purchase, while their fleet of vehicles delivered goods across Birmingham and to areas such as Wolverhampton & Lichfield. The business was one of a selected retailers who sold Suttons Seeds.

During the late 1950s, Barrow's Stores moved into the emerging supermarket business, with a new store opening in Solihull during 1959 (it closed in 1967). In the 1960s Barrow's moved from their location on the corner of Bull Street and Corporation Street to a smaller store on Corporation Street opposite Lewis', where the new store concentrated on food. The business was purchased by Fitch Lovell in 1964, and in December 1973 they merged Barrow's into their chain Key Markets Supermarkets.

J.R.R. Tolkien's fascination for Barrow's led him to name his student club T.C.B.S. (Tea Club and Barrovian Society) after the store.
