= Pocha =

Pocha could refer to:

- Pojangmacha, a South Korean term for outdoor carts that sell street food.
- Pocha Seeds, seed company from India
