= Keevil and Keevil =

British butcher shop

Coordinates: 51°31′07″N 0°06′10″W

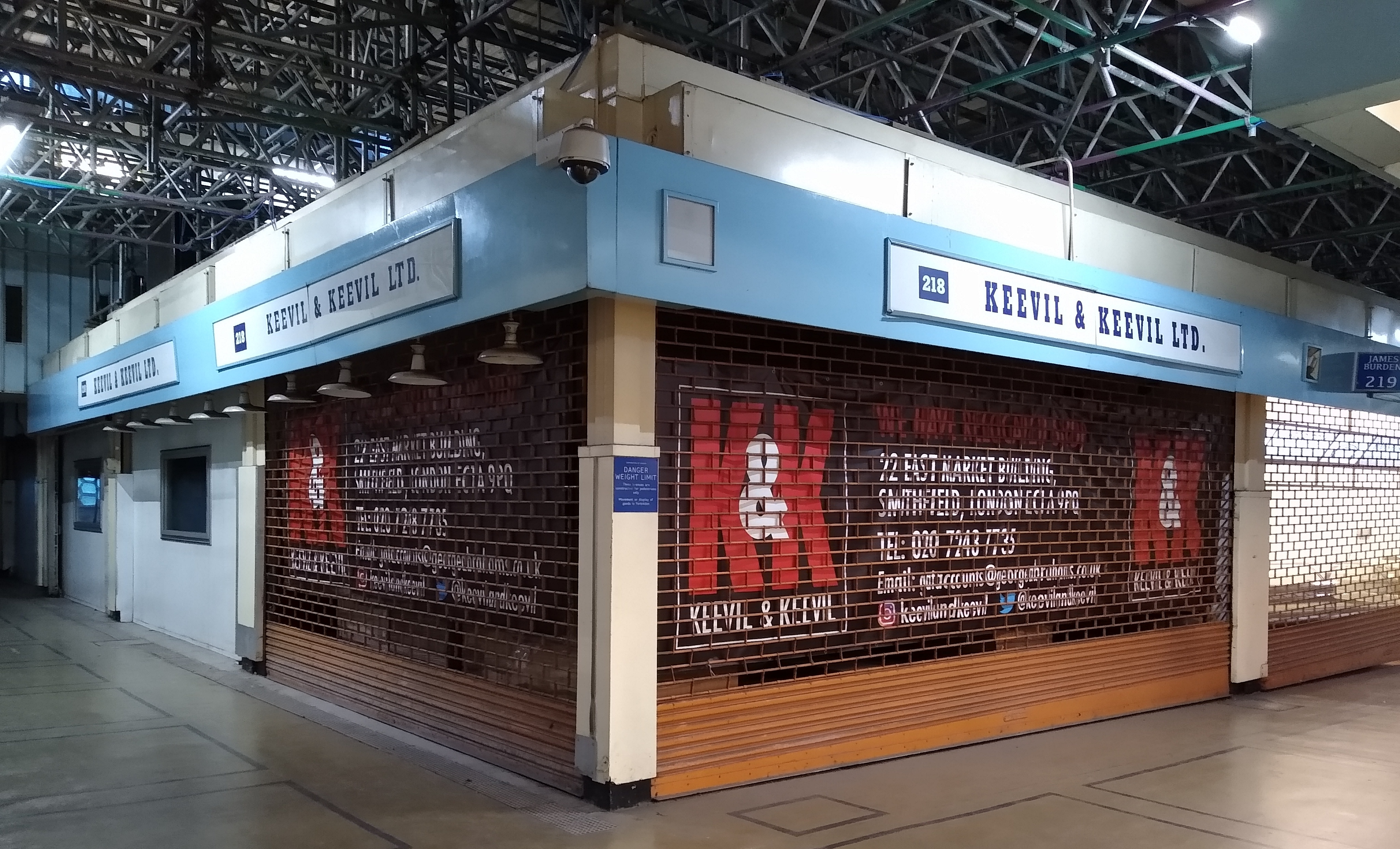
Keevil and Keevil

Keevil and Keevil are British butchers, and are the oldest company still operating from London's Smithfield Market.

== History ==
Nicholas de Kevilly is the first name in the records of this old Wiltshire family. He was recorded as living in Camelay in Somerset in 1260. The de Kevilly's were yeoman farmers, and they all lived within a 20-mile radius for nearly 600 years. Gradually the name was anglicised and changed to Keevil.

Job Keevil was born in 1830, and was one of 14 children. As they had trouble finding work for the whole family in their local area, he left Somerset to come to London, and founded the wholesale provision firm Keevil & Best, in Cowcross Street, near Smithfield Market. His brother Peter, who had been born in 1837, came to London soon after, and he also started a provisions company, Peter Keevil and Sons. When Job died 3 years later, Peter bought Keevil & Best and it became part of his company.

Peter's youngest brother Clement (b. 1850) followed his older siblings to London in 1866, and sought his brother's permission to begin a business. They agreed that Peter would keep to selling provisions, and Clement would only sell meat and poultry – so that the two would not be in direct competition. Clement opened his first shop in Brixton in 1872. His friend Frederick Dean already had a shop in Smithfield, which had previously been at Newgate Market since 1794. Frederick asked Clement to go into partnership with him. Clement kept the shop in Brixton as well, but it was run by his shop manager Tom Weston.

He shared his time between the two companies and his Shire Horse business – in which he had a keen interest. In his time he sold horses to many high-profile buyers, including King Edward VII. In the London Cart Horse Show of 1882, Clement was Highly Commended for his stallion Britons Glory. Clement was one of the founders of the Van Horse Parade in Regent's Park, which begun in 1904 and still takes place every Easter Sunday, although now known as The London Harness Horse Parade.

Frederick Dean left the Smithfield business after only a few months and Tom Weston came over from Brixton to run it as a partnership. The name was changed to Keevil & Weston, and they traded as such for 25 years. Weston died very suddenly in 1908, leaving Clement to run the business on his own – something he was unprepared for, especially with the amount of time he liked to spend with his horses.

Luckily Clement's son Percy had done well in the silk industry in Manchester and wanted to move to London to go into business with his father. He became a partner in the firm in 1910, after Clement lent him the money to buy a 3/7 share in the company.

They changed the business name to Keevil & Keevil in 1911.

In 1913 Clement's youngest son Ambrose also joined the firm, starting as an office boy on £1 a week. He had spent some time in Paris and was put in charge of buying from and selling to foreign meat suppliers. During World War I of 1914–1918, Ambrose volunteered for the army and was sent to France, leaving his brother and father to run the business.

Keevils were trailblazers in their time – Miss Masters, the first woman to work full-time at Smithfield Market, was a Keevils employee from 1917. She later left to marry and eventually became the Mayoress of Ilford.

Clement's wife Emma died in 1919, and after this he spent a lot more time with his horses rather than at Smithfield. When Clement died in 1925 the firm ceased trading at breakfast time, and although he had not been active in the business for some years, all of the staff attended the funeral. His tombstone carried the words of St Paul: "I have fought a good fight".

In the 1920s the Keevil brothers excelled in importing and exporting of meats across Europe, particularly excelling in the Christmas turkey trade – something of a logistical nightmare in the days before refrigerated transport.

In the late 1930s, as war began to seem inevitable, Ambrose (in his role as Chairman of the Co-Ordination Committee of the Provision Exchanges) persuaded many large suppliers to enter into a gentleman's agreement that food prices would be frozen, to avoid sharp rises at the war scare.

This was a success and the Food (Defence Places) department wrote a letter to Ambrose. Extract below:

"As you are aware, the agreement was followed by similar agreements in a large number of other trades, and this proved of real national value."

The President of the Board of Trade, the Right Honourable Oliver Stanley, also wrote to Ambrose:

"I am writing to express my sincere thanks for your work during the recent crisis in connection with the organisation of the distribution of provisions throughout the United Kingdom. I feel very much indebted to you not only for your personal efforts.. but also for the way in which you obtained the co-operation of provisions importers throughout the country.”

In August 1939, 3 days before the outbreak of war, the UK Government's Ministry of Food appointed Ambrose as the Chairman of the London Area Committee, whose role it was to ensure that supplies could still get through in the event of shops and warehouses being destroyed. This became a very busy and challenging role during the heavy bombing of London during the Blitz. Keevils suffered much damage in the bombing. All of their sites in Smithfield were affected – the 23 and 24 King Street and 228 and 229 Central Market shops were destroyed, and 36 Snow Hill was badly damaged. Percy still ran Keevils from the ruined Market, and refused to move even when served with papers instructing him to do so by the Ministry of Food – and signed by his brother Ambrose!

Ambrose was subsequently called up for a military Command position in 1942.

On 8 March 1945, a Keevils employee named Mears had been taking his turn firewatching, and was killed when a V-2 rocket struck Smithfield causing 110 deaths. This was only 2 weeks before the end of the V-2 strikes.

After the War the two brothers decided the time had come to move on, and sold a majority interest to Fitch Lovell, another long-established market name, having been in operation since 1784.

Although they sold their majority share, the brothers still kept a close eye on the company – with Percy visiting the Smithfield offices regularly until he was 89 years old.

Fitch Lovell was brought into the spotlight after being given the licence to produce spam in the UK (doing so at its Gateacre factory, Liverpool), where it stayed until production switched to the Danish Crown Group (owners of the Tulip Food Company) in 1998, forcing the closure of the Liverpool factory and the loss of 140 jobs.

In 1991 Keevils was sold by Fitch Lovell and bought by George Abrahams, who was already a successful Smithfield trader in his own right.

As part of the George Abrahams Group, Keevils became part of one of the largest supply groups on Smithfield, and the launch of their website in 2009 saw them also launch into the online meat trade.

== Ambrose Keevil ==
Perhaps the most widely successful and highly regarded member of the Keevil family was Sir Ambrose Keevil.

Ambrose achieved the grade of Colonel during his service in World War II, and was awarded an MBE, Military Cross and bar (1918), CBE (1944), and Knighthood(1952) and(1961) for "Political and Public services in the Home Counties(52) / South East of England(62)”. Colonel Keevil was also the President of the East Surrey Conservative Association and The High Sheriff of Surrey for 1956

Ambrose became the Chairman and Managing Director of Fitch Lovell from 1959–1963, and was the President of the company from 1963–1969, until his retirement in the same year at the age of 70.

Of his retirement, the Commissioner of Uganda and former Divisional Food Officer, J.R.P Postlethwaite, wrote in his book 'I Look Back':

"Colonel Ambrose Keevil who had steered the wholesale ship through the first two years of war.. tendered his resignation. The Ministry owed him much; London also owed him much".

== See also ==
- List of butcher shops
