= Saxby Bros Ltd =

Saxby Brothers (Bros) Ltd
- Industry: Food Manufacturing
- Founded: 1904
- Defunct: 2008
- Fate: Takeover
- Successor: General Mills
- Headquarters: Wellingborough, Northamptonshire
- Products: Melton Mowbray Pork Pie, Pastry, Delicatessen, Sausage & Meat
- Number of employees: 325

Saxby Bros Limited was a food manufacturing company based in Wellingborough, Northamptonshire, who manufactured pork pies, delicatessen, meat and pastry products. In 2007, the company was taken over by General Mills, which led to its closure a year later. The factory is now demolished and redeveloped for housing.

== History ==
The company began as a butchery in 1904, by brothers Herbert and Ted Saxby, opened a shop to sell their meat and pies, which the carcasses were displayed hanging outside the shop frontage. Pies were handmade above the shop, and various meats were prepared in the kitchen. Herbert would catch the 3.17 am train to buy pigs at Smithfield Market in London at dawn, returning to Wellingborough to open the shop at 9am.

The brothers raised funds to purchase the vacant land next door where a small bakery and extended butchery was constructed. Home deliveries of their produce were carried out using a pony and trap to customers who were unable to visit the Saxby's shop. A veal and ham pie would sell for a shilling; an individual pork pie cost tuppence.

== Expansion ==
Saxby's thrived and opened their first factory in 1912 at Brook Street East, half-a-mile from the town centre where 12 workers were employed. By 1921, a pig abattoir and a sausage department was constructed. The brothers originally began the business by butchering ten pigs a week; this amount rose to 500 when Saxby's celebrated their Golden Jubilee.

From 1938, the company expanded six times. In 1988, HRH Diana, Princess of Wales officially opened an £8 million extension and office block at Chester Road in the town, backing onto the Brook Street East site.

== Product range and customers ==
The company was famous for their Melton Mowbray pork pies which were made to a secret recipe. The product range was varied which resulted in producing other baked delicatessen products for supermarkets; chicken & ham pies, pork gala, turkey & stuffing as well as puff pastry; steak & kidney pies, minced beef, Cornish Pasties and fruit pies.

Saxby's also manufactured raw products from their own butchery; sausages, ham, cured pork & faggots (meat balls with gelatine).

The overall product produced was chilled pastry which was sold in its entirety, first launched by Saxby's in 1962. This gave consumers the opportunity to bake their own pies at home. The company participated at the East of England Showground, the Ideal Home Exhibition, and other outdoor events which resulted in winning more than 100 national prizes. Pies have also been sold in famous outlets; Rackhams of Birmingham, Harrods, Selfridges, and Fortnum & Mason in London. Saxby's also held major contracts with the other leading supermarkets.

Saxby's owned a fleet of vans and delivery lorries, travelling to small towns and villages to sell their products, especially to customers who were isolated. In 1994, the company created a food service division named as Irchester Grange. The products were vacuumed-packed pies and pastries sold to the commercial sector, where the major contracts were British Rail and British Airways.

Saxby's earned international acclaim by commissioning worldwide customers, exporting their products to South Africa, Malaysia, West Indies and the Ministry of Defence British army based in Bahrain.

== Shops ==
The company owned 14 shops across Northamptonshire, Hertfordshire, Bedfordshire and three separate shops in Wellingborough: Midland Road, Cambridge Street and later, in the Swansgate Shopping Centre. However, 2002 saw Saxby's close their final Wellingborough shop located in the Swansgate Shopping Centre due to competition from the supermarket chains.

== Takeover and closure ==
Saxby's was one of the major players in the food industry. The business since its inception had always been under family ownership. In 2001 the Innovation Centre was established, where ideas were dedicated to improving and refreshing their product range, which followed their 100th anniversary celebrations in 2004. A book was published highlighting the company history and achievements, where gifts were handed to their employees.

In 2005, Saxby's announced that it was to end production of sausage meat and delicatessen baked goods due to increased competition, price pressure and poor sales. There were 325 members of staff employed and 200 redundancies were planned. The chilled pastry continued production, as well as the Melton Mowbray meat pies which were then sold in a raw format. 125 staff remained at the restructured sector. In early 2007, Saxby's was purchased by General Mills, the parent company of Jus-Rol, who obtained the remaining business. After consultation with staff, it was decided to close outright the Chester Road and Brook Street East sites.

A year later, the chilled pastry sector was transferred to Jus-Rol's Berwick-Upon-Tweed division. The Saxby's pastry brand was absorbed into Jus Rol, resulting the last 125 staff redundant from Saxby's. The site was returned to Saxby Bros Holdings; the factory demolished and the land redeveloped for housing. The Saxby's Melton Mowbray, meat and pastry brands have completely disappeared from supermarket shelves, ending a part of Northamptonshire's heritage and history.
