= Jus-Rol =

Manufacturer of chilled and frozen pastry, and related products such as vol-au-vents

- Product type: Pastry
- Current owner: Rinkelberg Capital
- Country: United Kingdom
- Introduced: 1954; 72 years ago
- Markets: Worldwide
- Previous owners: Fitch Lovell; Booker Group; Grand Metropolitan; General Mills; Cérélia
- Tagline: "Pastry to be proud of"
- Website: jusrol.co.uk

Jus-Rol is a manufacturer of chilled and frozen pastry and related products, such as vol-au-vents. The company is owned by Rinkelberg Capital.

The company began in 1954 in Coldstream, Scotland, when local baker, Mr Tom Forsythe, started selling "Just Roll" puff pastry to his customers. In 1975 the business was sold to the food giant Fitch Lovell, before being sold off by Booker Group (the new owners of Fitch Lovell) in 1990 to Grand Metropolitan which subsequently sold it to General Mills.

In early 2007, the parent company of Jus-Rol, General Mills, acquired the Northamptonshire frozen pastry and pork pie company Saxby Bros Ltd, in a takeover bid. All frozen pastry production was transferred from the Wellingborough Saxby's site to Berwick-upon-Tweed in 2008, terminating the Saxby brand. In 2016 the Berwick site closed as General Mills moved production outside the UK.

In 2021, Cérélia UK acquired Jus-Rol from General Mills, but following an order by the Competition and Markets Authority, in 2025 sold Jus-Rol's business in the UK and the Republic of Ireland to Rinkelberg Capital.

== British Pie Week ==
In 2007, Jus-Rol launched an annual celebration British Pie Week on 4 March.
