= Marc Fitch =

English historian

Marc Fitch CBE FBA FSA
- Born: 5 January 1901; Kensington, London, England
- Died: 2 April 1994 (aged 93); Andover, Hampshire, England
- Education: Repton School
- Occupations: Historian, philanthropist, businessman
- Partner(s): Evelyn Murray Wilson (Dissolved); Ismene Georgalopoulo

Marcus Felix Brudenell Fitch CBE FBA FSA, (5 January 1908 – 2 April 1994) was an English historian and philanthropist.

Fitch was born in Kensington, London in 1908, the only child of provision merchant Hugh Bernard Fitch (1873–1962) and his wife Bertha Violet (née James). His family owned the food company Fitch & Son Ltd, later named Fitch Lovell. Fitch was educated at Wagner’s Day Preparatory School in Kensington, the Dragon School, Oxford, and then at Repton School, before joining the family business as an apprentice in central Europe, as his father wanted him to learn languages. He was appointed a director of the company in 1930. In 1933, he married Evelyn Murray Wilson, with whom he had a son and a daughter, before their marriage was dissolved.

During his life he travelled around Europe, with interests in history, antiquities, and archaeology. Fitch was appointed as a Gold Staff Officer by the Duke of Norfolk, and acted as an usher at both the coronations of King George VI and Queen Elizabeth II. During World War II, Fitch served with the Intelligence Corps, serving in the Belgian Congo, Eritrea and Egypt. While in Egypt, he met Ismene Georgalopoulo, whom he married in 1949. Soon after their marriage, Fitch purchased Olivers, a Georgian manor house in Stanway, Essex which started his interest in the county's history. In 1952 he was elected a Fellow of the Society of Antiquaries of London, and was also made a Fellow of the British Academy.

While he was chairman of the British Record Society (1949–67) he set up the Marc Fitch Fund (1956), an educational charity which funds research and publication, primarily in the UK, in the fields of archaeology, historical geography, history of art, and architecture, heraldry and genealogy. Fitch also served as the chairman of the Society of Genealogists during 1956, and was the master of the Worshipful Company of Tallow Chandlers in 1957–8.

Fitch was awarded an Honorary DLitt. by the University of Leicester. A university building was named after him, which housed the Marc Fitch Library, a large collection of local history and a collection of national geography that Fitch helped build with F.W. Steer. The library moved to the Attenborough building in 2020. The university's Marc Fitch Historical Institute, on Salisbury Road, is a centre for urban historical research named after Fitch.

Between 1975 and 1988, the Marc Fitch Award for Bibliography was funded by Fitch. Since 1956, the Marc Fitch lectures have been given by guest speakers, including David Starkey. During the 1970s, Fitch helped set up the Aurelius Trust, a charity which makes donations in the interests of the conservation of culture.

In 1973 the British School at Athens built a laboratory with Fitch's backing, named after him. Fitch had been involved with the school since his marriage to Ismene, and during the 1960s had been member of the School’s Managing Committee, and had co-funded the Stratigraphical Museum at Knossos with Dame Joan Evans. He was appointed as Vice President of the school in 1978.

In 1977, Fitch was awarded CBE. Fitch died in 1994 in Andover, Hampshire.

== The Marc Fitch Lectures ==
The lectures were started by Marc Fitch in 1956, and are funded by the Marc Fitch Fund, an educational charity also set up in 1956.

The lectures were held at the Institute of Historical Research until 2012, when the series moved to a tour of the counties with three held a year.

=== Previous lectures ===
- 1 February 2005 – Roy Strong – "Forgotten faces: regional history and regional portraiture"
- 6 July 2009 – John Morrill – "The British Revolution in the English Provinces, 1640–9"
- 2010 – Steve Hindle – "Below stairs at Arbury Hall: Sir Richard Newdigate and his household staff, c.1670–1710"
- 2011 – Jeremy Black – "London History"
- 25 June 2012 – David Starkey – "Head of Our Morality: why the twentieth-century British monarchy matters"
- 18 May 2013 – Tristram Hunt – "Aristocracy and Industry: the Sutherlands in Staffordshire"
- 25 October 2013 – Christopher Dyer – "Corby, Northamptonshire and Beyond: The History of Industry in the Countryside"
- 12 April 2014 – David Hey – "The Origins and Spread of Derbyshire Surnames"
- 24 October 2014 – Trevor Rowley – "The Making of the Shropshire Landscape"
- 14 November 2015 – Chris Mullin – "Changing Face of Sunderland"
