= Pocha Seeds =

Indian seed company

The seed company Pestonjee P. Pocha & Sons at Pune was founded by Pestonjee P. Pocha (1854—1917) in 1884 in a small store at Char Bowri in Poona with two staff members. This was the first indigenous seed company in India. They were followed by Suttons Seeds company in Calcutta in 1912, a branch of the older British seed company. The company grew to 70 employees in 1939 and established its own printing press printing catalogues, calendars atc. They sold seeds for vegetables, flowers, fruits as well as garden tools and equipment. Palekar and Co of Bombay were founded in 1871 but they sold imported seeds. Pestonjee P. Pocha & Sons initially imported seeds from Cape of Good Hope with a climate similar to India.

The Pocha Seed company supplied seeds within India as well as overseas, including Oman, Ceylon and Philippines. Many gardeners in India remember starting with Pocha seeds. They published a Pochas Garden Guide in 1916 with detailed planting instructions, sometimes with specific instructions for different cities in India.

Its modern descendant Pocha Seeds Pvt. Ltd was founded in 1972. They sell seeds for vegetables, flowers, fruits and also offers nursery plants, fertilizers, planters & pots, garden tools and irrigation equipments.

Ustad Mian Abdullah Naqaash (traditional ornamental designer) of Multan in late 19th century used to use a catalogue of Pestonjee P. Pocha & Sons to design frescos in Multan.

== Also see ==
- Suttons Seeds
- Seed company
