= David Greig (supermarket) =

British supermarket chain

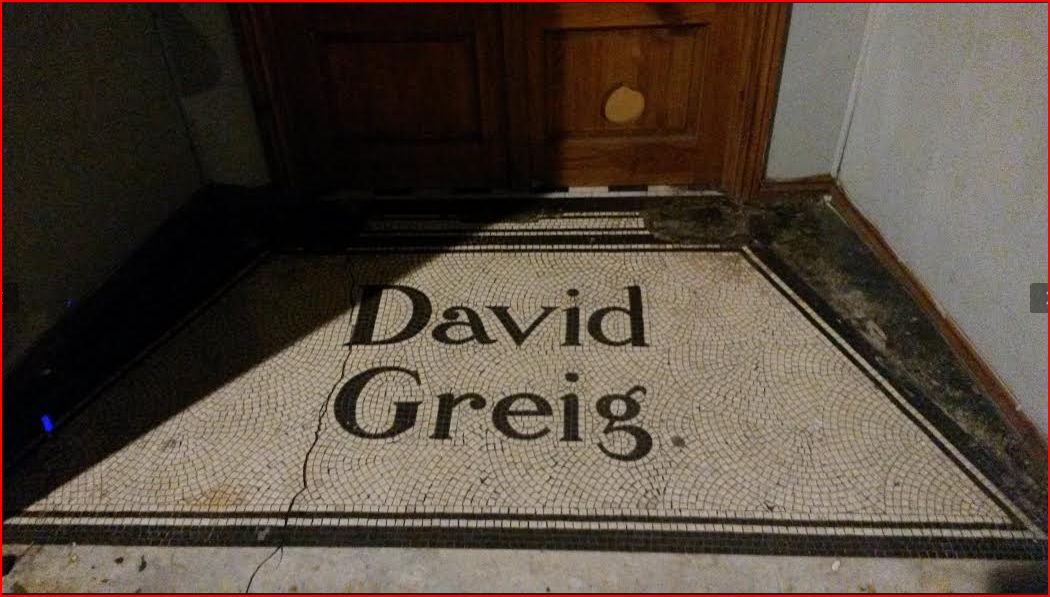
- Traded as: Public company
- Industry: Grocers & Supermarket chain
- Founded: 1870
- Founder: Mary Greig
- Fate: Purchased initially by Wrensons, before being bought by Fitch Lovell and being merged into the Key Markets Supermarket chain.
- Headquarters: London, England
- Area served: United Kingdom

David Greig was initially a grocery store that grew to become one of the burgeoning supermarket chains in the United Kingdom. The original business was founded by the Greig family of Hornsey, North London. During the seventies, the business was first purchased by Wrensons, a Midlands-based grocery chain before the combined group took on the David Greig name. The combined company was purchased by British food conglomerate Fitch Lovell and was eventually merged into the group's supermarket chain Key Markets.

== The original David Greig company ==
The David Greig chain is considered to have been established in 1870, when the wife of a Hornsey cabinet maker of Scots birth, Mary Greig opened a small provisions shop at 32 High Street, Hornsey. By 1881 her son David Greig had joined her in the business and described himself as a 'provision dealer' in the census of that year. The business thrived and wishing to expand beyond Hornsey, Greig opened his first shop at 54-58 Atlantic Road, Brixton in 1888, which he and his wife, Hannah Susan Deacock lived above. Around 1890 a second shop was opened at nearby Loughborough Junction, near Brixton. This was probably the shop at 232 Coldharbour Lane where a wooden 'David Greig' fascia with 'Brilliant cut' gilded lettering in the distinctive serif typeface of the chain, was uncovered in 2020. In 1895, David Greig was accused of selling margarine as butter.

The company continued to expand with stores across the South of England, including Exmouth Market, London, Windsor, Basingstoke and Clacton. The company employed the services of architect Philip Woollatt Home to design the company's stores. In 1928 the company opened a new headquarters at 145 Waterloo Road, London, also called the Scotch House. John and Mary Sainsbury having opened their first grocery shop in Holborn one year earlier and were initially friends. However, a deep personal rivalry developed between the two families, because of acrimonious feelings about the Greigs' alleged betrayal of a verbal agreement regarding the purchasing of sites for development. In 1932, David Greig opened the first self-service grocery store in the UK at Turnpike Lane, Hornsey, but the store although a success, was closed down after 8 months of the experiment.

In 1958, David Greig died at the age of 86, with his son David Ross Greig running the business. In 1962 the company merged with Colebrook & Co, a chain of butchers and fishmongers. By the late 1960s, there were more than 220 Greig shops across the south of the country, all trading under the David Greig brand. During the 60s, the company launched their own magazine for customers and were one of the pioneers of own brand goods using the Thistle brand. The company continued to be innovative when they were the first company to wrap butter in metallised cellulose wrap. However, by 1971, the company had shrunk down to 134 stores with a turnover of £24 million.

== Wrensons Stores ==
The company of Wrensons Stores was started in 1909 to take over the running of nine grocery stores in the Birmingham area. The company was listed on the Birmingham Stock Exchange in 1950, and by 1962 operated 120 stores across Birmingham. Wrensons by 1971 was a chain of small grocery stores serving the Midlands with approximately £5 million in turnover. The business was purchased by the Green brothers, Martin and Peter, in April 1972 for £700,000, whom had previously built up the Adsega supermarket chain and sold it to Tesco. Shortly after purchasing Wrensons, the Green brothers added the seventy store chain of Manchester-based grocers, T.Redmans. This was followed by the purchase of David Greig for £10 million in June of the same year, all backed by funding from Slater Walker. The Greig family had to sell the business due to the death of several family members and owing large death duties. The New Wrenson group was taken public in October, with the share prospectus stating that the combined group had 266 stores, which 66 were self service. Wrensons sold off Greig's freehold stores in Bromley, High Wycombe, Maidenhead, Ramsgate, Torquay and Plymouth for £1.9 million while the former headquarters at Waterloo Road was put on the market for £3.25 million. In 1972 the combined company had lost £315,000.

== Return to David Greig and demise ==
In 1973, the combined group formally changed its name from Wrensons to David Greig Ltd, but by the following year was subjected to take-over interest from retail conglomerate Combined English Stores. A fee of £12.5 million was agreed, but the shareholders of Combined English Stores withdrew support for the deal as there were validity questions over David Greig's projected trading figures. However, by April the board had accepted a £6 million bid from the food processing, wholesaling and retailing conglomerate Fitch Lovell. The deal was completed, and Fitch Lovell recouped half of the purchase price by selling stores for £3.4 million. By 1976 David Greig Stores had shrunk down to 86, before being re-branded under Fitch Lovell's own chain Key Markets.

== Images of former David Greig stores ==
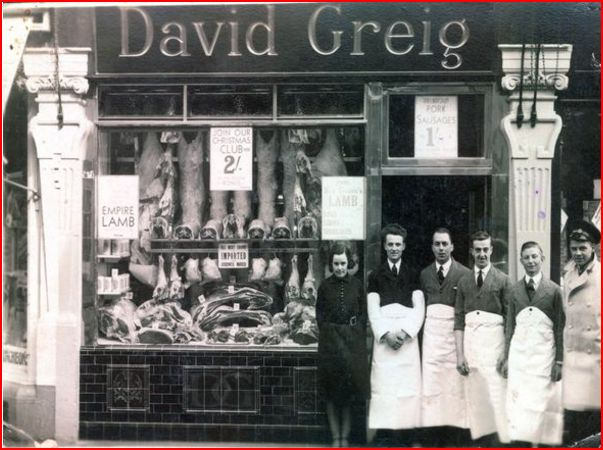

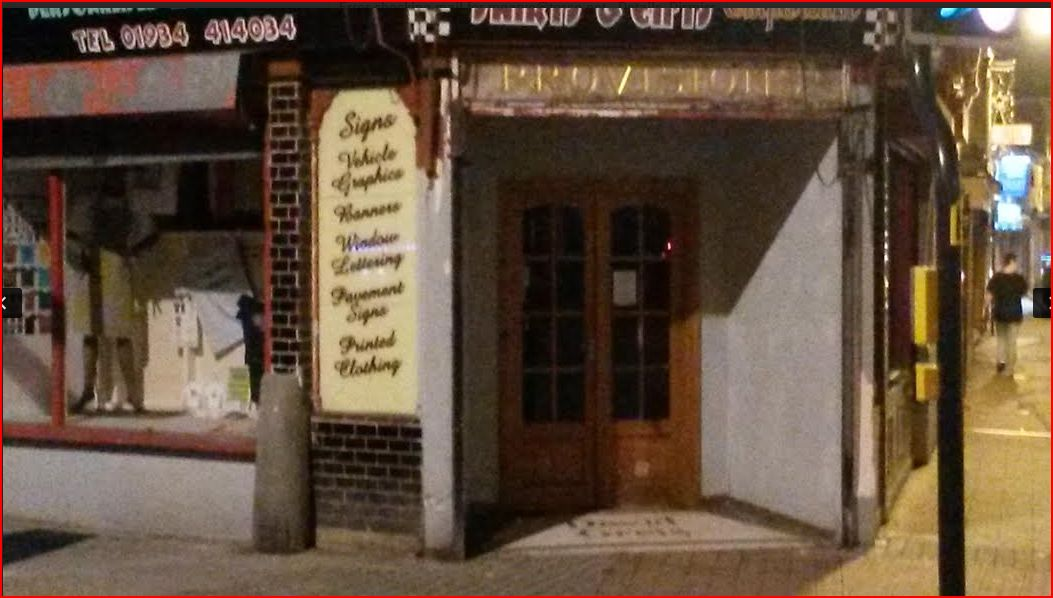
Shop Front Meadow St Weston super Mare 2015

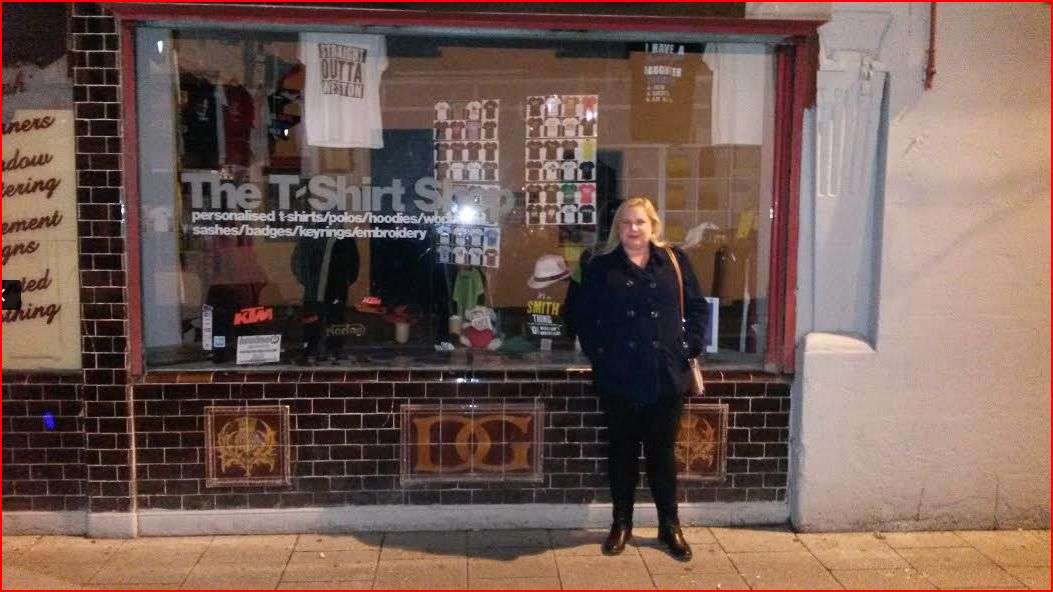
Shop Front 2015

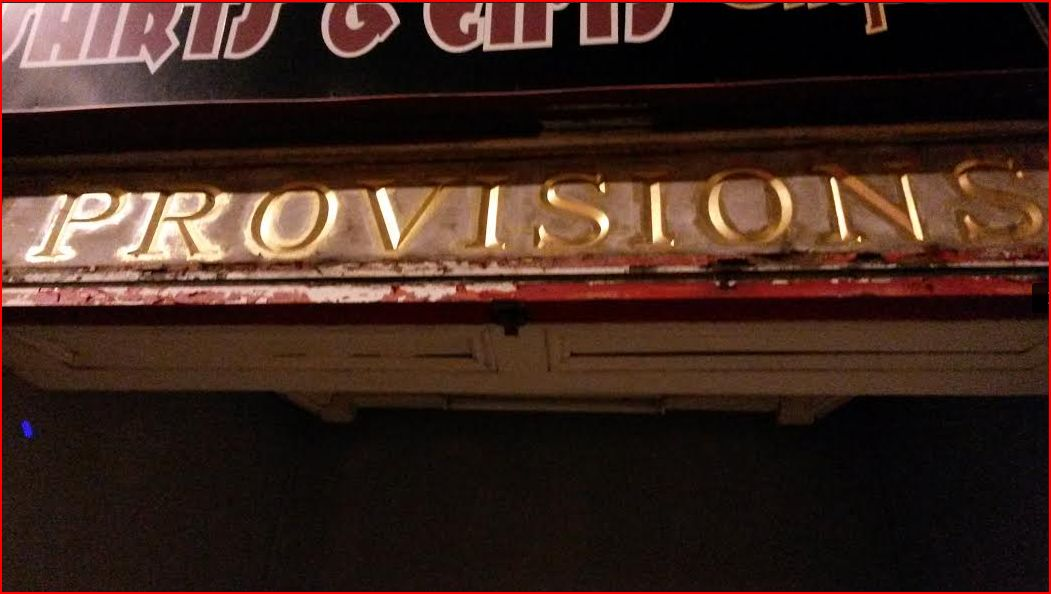
Shop Front 2015

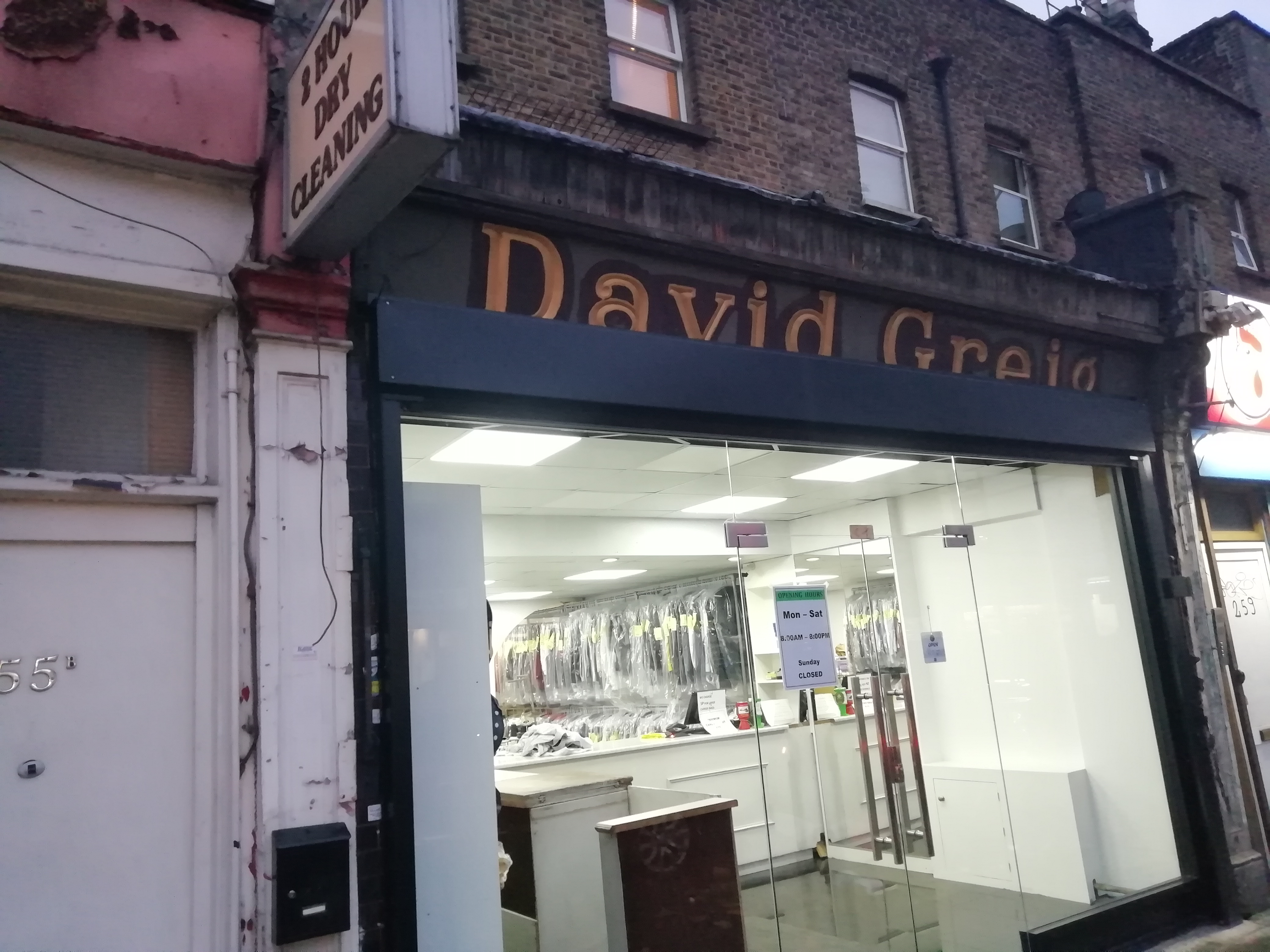
David Greig shop sign.

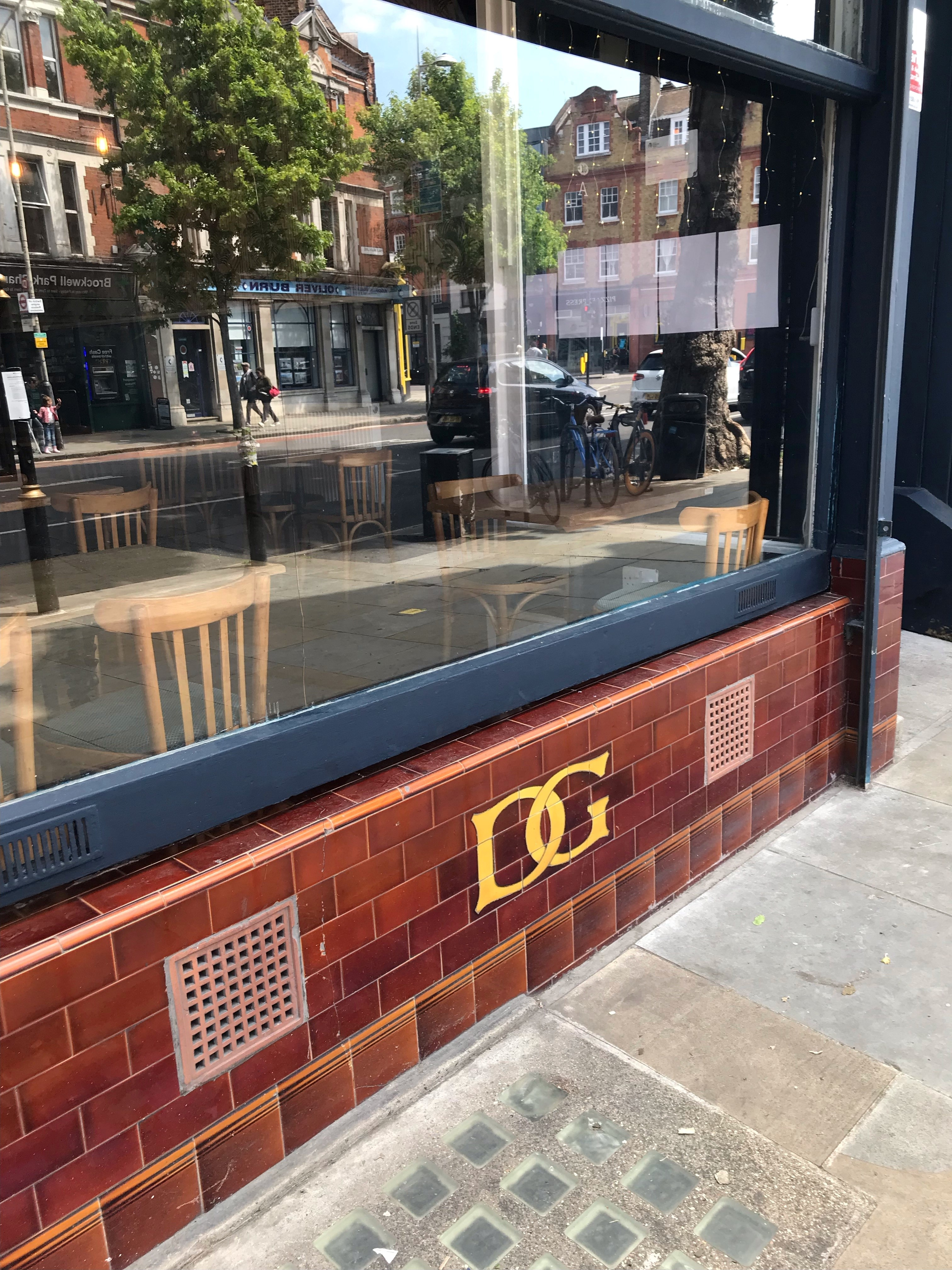
David Greig tiling at 16 Half Moon Lane in Herne Hill.

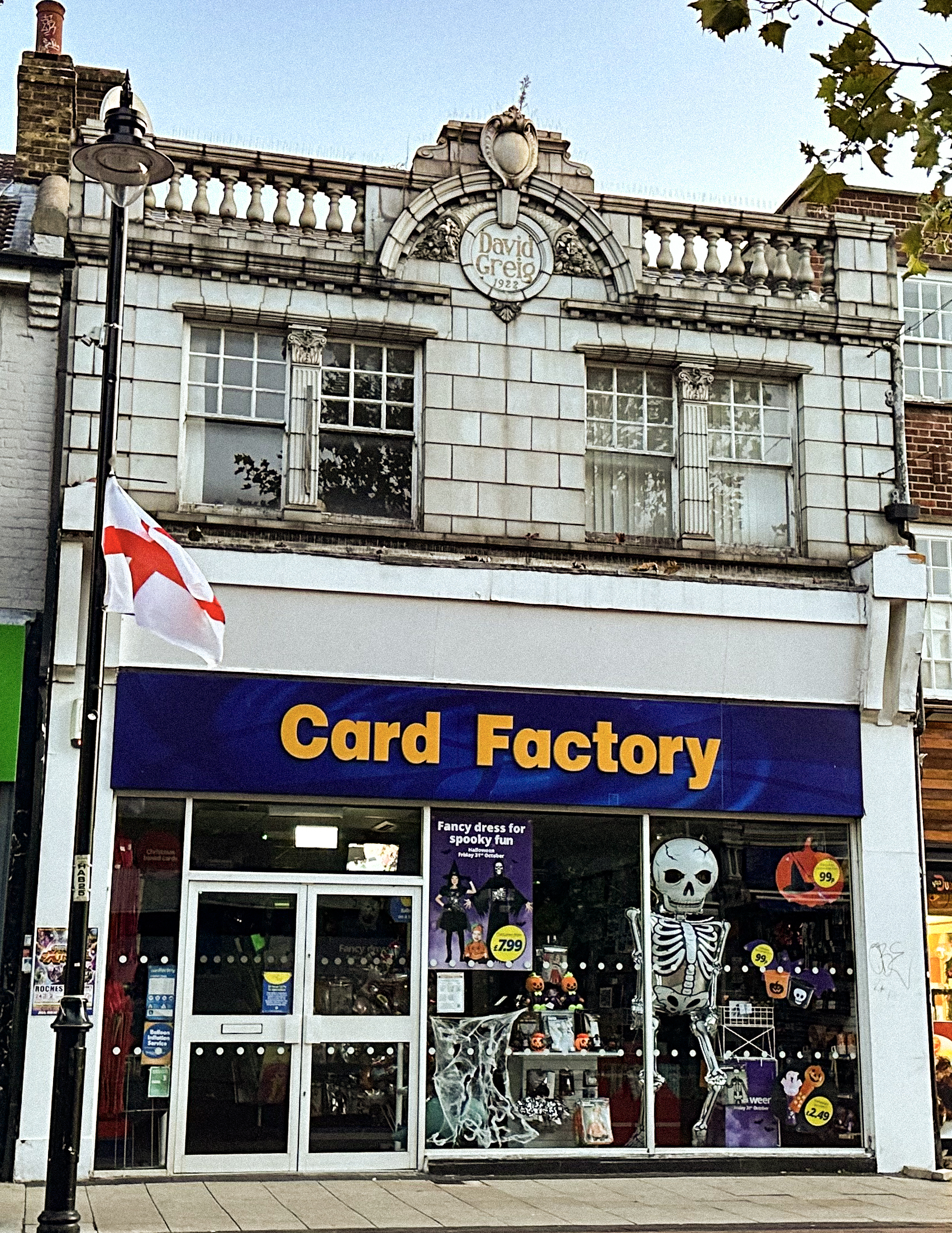
David Greig façade (1922), now occupying a Card Factory, in Gillingham High Street, Kent.

== Legacy ==
David Greig was a notable philanthropist, and, grateful for the education he received at the local parish school in Hornsey village, creating the David & Mary Grieg trust in 1933 for the benefit of Hornsey and the community. These have contributed to the Greig City Academy in Hornsey.

A commemorative plaque has been placed on 32 Hornsey High Street, the site of the very first Greig shop. The David Greig shop at 54-58 Atlantic Road, Brixton, is no longer a supermarket, but the frontage, containing a "DG" cypher, remains relatively original, and although the full name has been removed from the facade it is still visible in the mosaic floor outside the recessed shop entrance. Two well-preserved examples of David Greig shops have been listed Grade II by Historic England - firstly in 2000 the branch at 177 Streatham High Road (for listing description see: https://historicengland.org.uk/listing/the-list/list-entry/1380345?section=official-listing) and later in 2017, No.65 Lordship Lane in East Dulwich both largely retain their authentic late 19th-century interiors.

The old David Greig building at 23 St Georges Street Canterbury (now Superdrug) was designed by Robert Paine and Partners in 1952 and became a listed building in 1995 under the English Heritage building protection scheme. There is an inscription on the wall, in memory of DAVID GREIG, founder and DAVID ROSS GREIG. When Superdrug refurbished the store in the 1990s and the marble replaced, a stonemason was employed to re-create the inscription. It can still be seen today.

Film of the Canterbury store from about 1955 is held in the collection of The Cinema Museum London Ref HM0355. There is another facility in Alcester (Warwickshire) in memory of his wife Hannah Susan. The current sports, arts and community facilities are called The Greig and are managed by the Hannah Susan Greig Memorial Company Limited. The family tableaux is located in Magpie Hall Lane cemetery, Bromley, London.ent. A David Greig shop sign was uncovered at No.257 Old Kent Road after the current occupiers carried out refurbishments in November 2019.

== See also ==
- List of supermarket chains in the United Kingdom
