= Russell Grigg =

Australian philosopher

- Born: 1963 (age 62–63)

Academic background
- Education: University of Paris VIII
- Thesis: La semantique du signifiant (1982)
- Doctoral advisor: Jacques-Alain Miller

Academic work
- Era: 21st-century philosophy
- Region: Western philosophy
- Institutions: Deakin University
- Main interests: psychoanalysis

Russell Grigg (born 1963) is an Australian philosopher and psychoanalyst and retired associate professor at Deakin University. He is known for his works on Jacques Lacan's thought.

== Books ==
- Lacan, Language, and Philosophy, SUNY Press. 2009
- Écrits: The First Complete Edition in English, trans. Bruce Fink with Héloïse Fink and Russell Grigg, W.W. Norton & Company, 2006
- Clemens, Justin and Russell Grigg (eds.), 2006, Jacques Lacan and the Other Side of Psychoanalysis: Reflections on Seminar XVII, Durham: Duke University Press
- Jacques Lacan, Book III: The Psychoses, 1955–1956, Jacques-Alain Miller (ed.), Russell Grigg (trans.), New York: W.W. Norton and Company, 1993
- Jacques Lacan, Book V: Formations of the Unconscious, 1957–1958, Jacques-Alain Miller (ed.), Russell Grigg (trans.), Cambridge: Polity, 2016
- Jacques Lacan, Book XVII: The Other Side of Psychoanalysis, 1969–1970, Jacques-Alain Miller (ed.), Russell Grigg (trans.), New York: W.W. Norton and Company, 2007
- Grigg, Russell; Hecq, Dominique; Smith, Craig (1999). Female Sexuality: The Early Psychoanalytic Controversies. London: Rebus Press. pp. 7–17. ISBN 1-900877-13-9.
