= Grieg (disambiguation) =

Grieg usually refers to the Norwegian composer and pianist Edvard Grieg. It may also refer to:

== People ==
- Grieg (surname)

== Enterprises ==
- Grieg Group, a Norwegian shipping and investment corporation
- Grieg Hall, a concert hall
- Grieg Seafood, an international seafood company
- Griegakademiet, a music conservatory

== Other uses ==
- Grieg (crater), a crater on Mercury

== See also ==
- Greig (disambiguation)
