= Greig (name) =

Greig is a surname and given name. The surname is of Scottish origin and is derived from a shortened form of the personal name Gregory and Greg. As a given name, Greig is of English and Scottish origin. This name is a short form of the names Gregory or Gregor. In some cases it is derived from the surname of the same spelling. A variant form of the given name is Gregg.

== Surname ==
- Aleksey Greig (1775–1845), Russian Admiral, son of Samuel Greig
- Andrew Greig (b. 1951), Scottish writer
- Andy Greig (1893 - after 1925), Scottish footballer
- Brian Greig (b. 1966), Australian politician
- Bruce Greig (1953–2008), Canadian ice hockey player
- Charlotte Greig (1954–2014), Maltese journalist, singer and songwriter
- Dara Greig (born 2000), Canadian ice hockey player
- Doug Greig (1928–2003), Canadian soccer player
- David Cunningham Greig (1922–1999), British Geologist
- Edvard Grieg, Norwegian composer and pianist, whose family name was of Scottish origin and originally spelled "Greig"
- Flos Greig, the first female barrister and solicitor in Australia
- Gavin Greig, the collector of Scottish folk songs
- Geoffrey Greig, English cricketer
- Geordie Greig (born 1960), English journalist and newspaper editor
- Ian Greig, English cricketer, brother of Tony Greig
- J. G. Greig (1871-1958), English cricketer
- Sir James William Greig (1859–1934), British barrister and Liberal Party politician
- John Greig, Scottish footballer
- Keith Greig, Australian rules footballer
- Mark Greig (born 1970), Canadian ice hockey player
- Mel Greig, Australian radio and television personality
- Nia Greig (born 2008), Jersey cricketer
- Ridly Greig (born 2002), Canadian ice hockey player
- Samuel Greig, Scottish-born Russian Admiral
- Tamsin Greig (b. 1966), British actress
- Teresa Billington-Greig (1877–1964), the suffragette who created the Women's Freedom League
- Thomas E. Greig (1921–1999), American businessman and politician
- Tony Greig (1946–2012), South Africa-born English cricketer and cricket commentator
- W. D. O. Greig (1851–1942), English footballer

== Given name ==
- Greig Fraser (b. 1975), Australian cinematographer
- Greig Laidlaw (b. 1985), Scottish Rugby Union international
- Greig Nori (b. 1962), Canadian producer and musician
- Greig Pickhaver (b. 1948), Australian actor and comedian
- Greig Smith, Los Angeles City Council member

== See also ==
- Grieg (surname)
