= Jacksons of Piccadilly =

Defunct London tea house, tea wholesaler and retailer

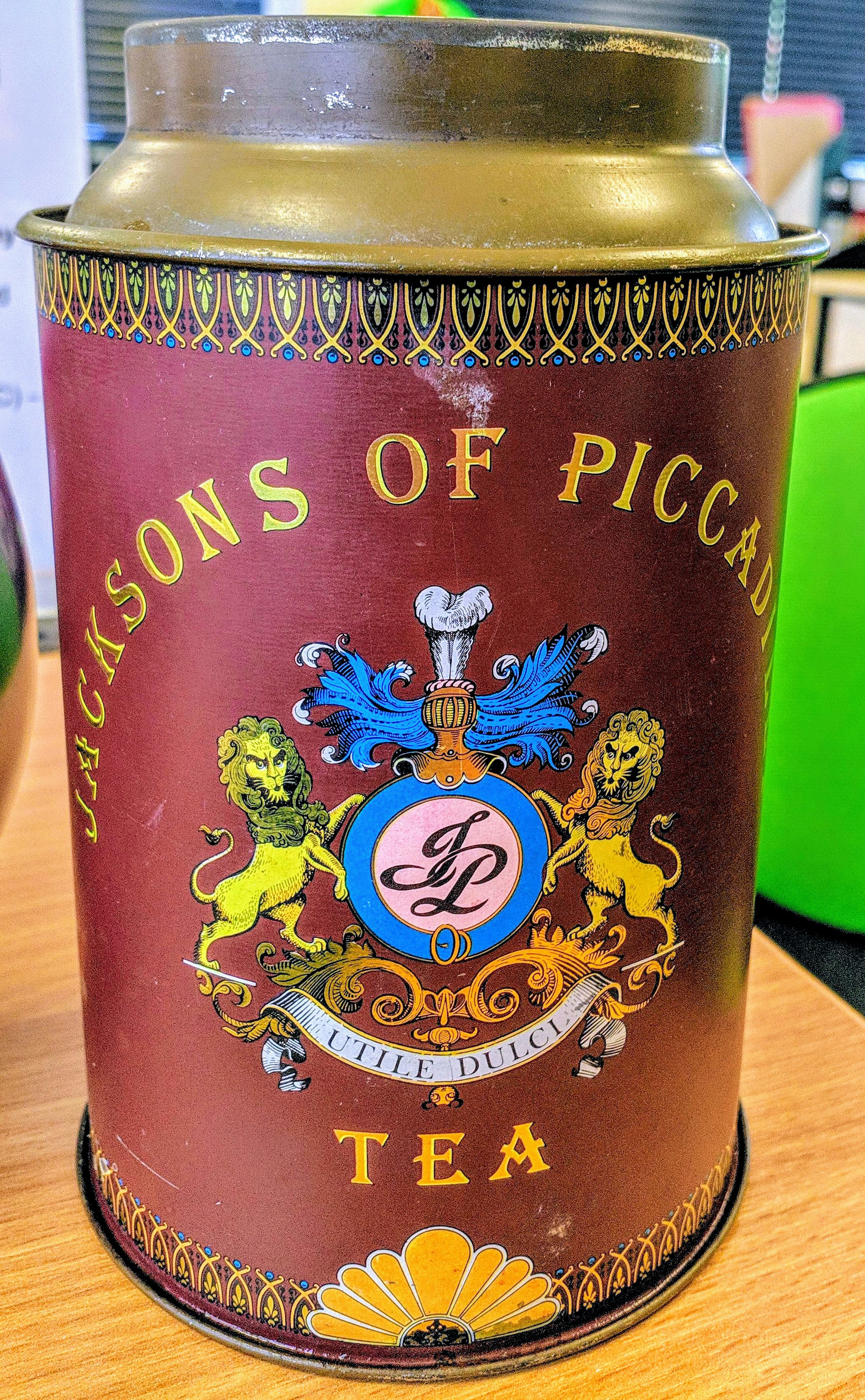
A vintage tea canister with the Jackson's of Piccadilly brand

Jacksons of Piccadilly was a London, England tea house, tea wholesaler and retailer, grocer, wine merchant, and deluxe department store, founded by Robert Jackson in Piccadilly in 1700. It is now a brand owned by R. Twinings and Company Limited, a former tea business rival.

By 1815, Jacksons had earned a reputation for selling pre-blended teas direct to customers, which was uncommon at that time because people blended different teas themselves at home. The Jacksons trade empire expanded and earned several Royal Warrants for tea from numerous royals through the 19th and 20th centuries. By 1905, Jacksons had moved to 171–172 Piccadilly.

An example of Jacksons' blending ability was its "The Lady Londonderry Mixture Tea". It was a blend of teas from the foothills of Ceylon (now Sri Lanka), the hills of Darjeeling district (in West Bengal state in India), and the tea gardens of Formosa (now the island of Taiwan). The blend was originally prepared for the Marchioness of Londonderry, Edith Vane-Tempest-Stewart (1878–1959), and in 1932 she gave her permission for the blend to be registered in her name.

Under Twinings, the Jacksons of Piccadilly brand offers six tea varieties, three of which are actually tisanes (herbal teas).

The company also claims (although this is contested) to have invented the "original" recipe for Earl Grey tea, Grey having given the recipe to Robert Jackson & Co. partner, George Charlton, in 1830.

== Gallery ==
The Lady Londonderry Mixture Tea blended by Jacksons

The Lady Londonderry tea sources

The Lady Londonderry's consent
