= Ron Grigg =

British chemist (died 2021)

- Ronald Ernest Grigg FRS
- Born: September 1, 1935; Southall
- Died: January 1, 2021 (aged 85); Leeds
- Education: University of Nottingham
- Spouse: Jean Mary Rose Palmer
- Children: Stephen Paul; Nicola Jayne
- Awards: Fellow of the Royal Society

Ronald Ernest Grigg FRS (1 September 1935 - 10 January 2021) was a British chemist and Professor of Organic Chemistry at the University of Leeds.

== Early life and education ==
Grigg was born in Southall, to Ernest Ronald Grigg (a parcels packer) and Gladys Vera McBride (née Price).

Prior to university, Grigg worked at Glaxo Laboratories from 1952 to 1960 whilst studying part-time for his first degree. He received his PhD from the University of Nottingham and undertook postdoctoral research at the University of Cambridge with the team led by Nobel Laureate Alexander (later Lord) Todd.

== Academic career ==
Grigg was appointed to a lectureship in organic chemistry at Nottingham in 1965 and remained there until 1974 when he became Professor of Organic Chemistry at Queen's University, Belfast. He was appointed Professor of Organic Chemistry at the University of Leeds in 1989. He retired from Leeds in 2001 when he was made Emeritus Professor.

== Honours ==
Grigg was elected a Fellow of the Royal Society (FRS) in 1999.

== Private life ==
Grigg married Jean Mary Rose Palmer in Ealing in 1956. They had two children: Stephen Paul in 1962, and Nicola Jayne in 1967.

Jean died in 2005. Ron Grigg died in Leeds on 10 January 2021.
