= Grieg (surname) =

Grieg is a Norwegian surname originating from the Scottish surname Greig, notably Alexander Greig, great-grandfather of Edvard Grieg. The spelling "Grieg" reflects the Scots pronunciation of "Greig" at the time the name migrated. (In Scots, ei is regularly pronounced 'ee', e.g. heid [=head].) Notable people with this surname include the following:

- Edvard Grieg (1843-1907), Norwegian composer and pianist
- Harald Grieg (1894–1972), Norwegian publisher
- John Grieg (1856-1905), Norwegian printer, publisher and bookseller
- Nina Grieg (1845-1935), Danish-Norwegian lyric soprano
- Nordahl Grieg (1902-1943), Norwegian poet, novelist, dramatist and journalist
- Otto Grieg Tidemand (1921-2006), Norwegian politician
