= Suttons Seeds =

English seed supply company

Suttons Consumer Products Limited

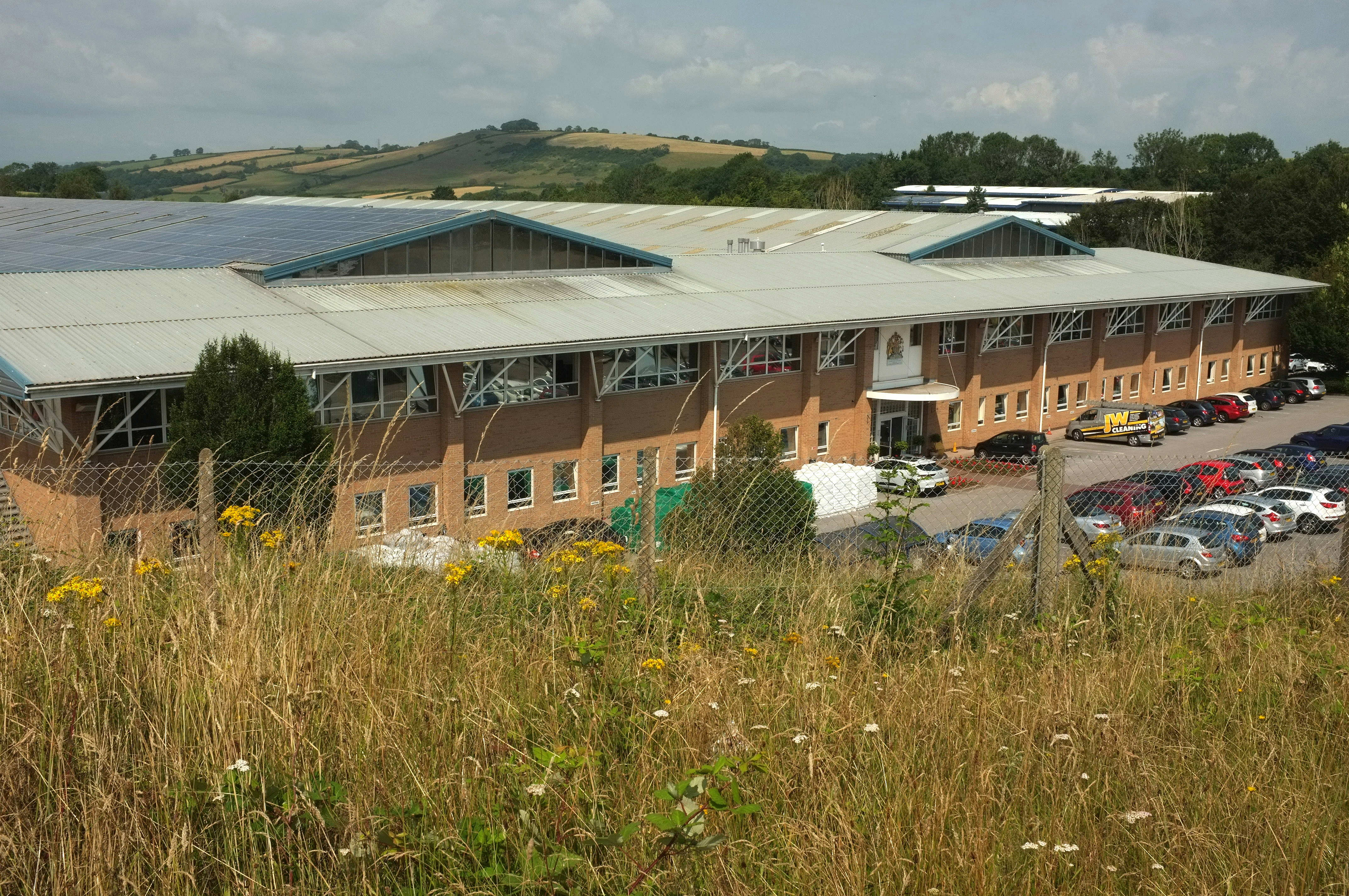
- Company office
- Type: Private
- Industry: Gardening
- Founded: 1806
- Headquarters: Paignton, Devon, England
- Area served: Worldwide
- Products: Seeds, plants, garden equipment
- Parent: Branded Garden Products Limited
- Website: www.suttons.co.uk

Suttons Seeds is a long established supplier of seeds, bulbs, and other horticultural products. Today based in the English town of Paignton, the company supplies its products worldwide, and until 2014 was part of the Vilmorin Clause & Compagnie group of companies.

== History ==
=== Founding ===
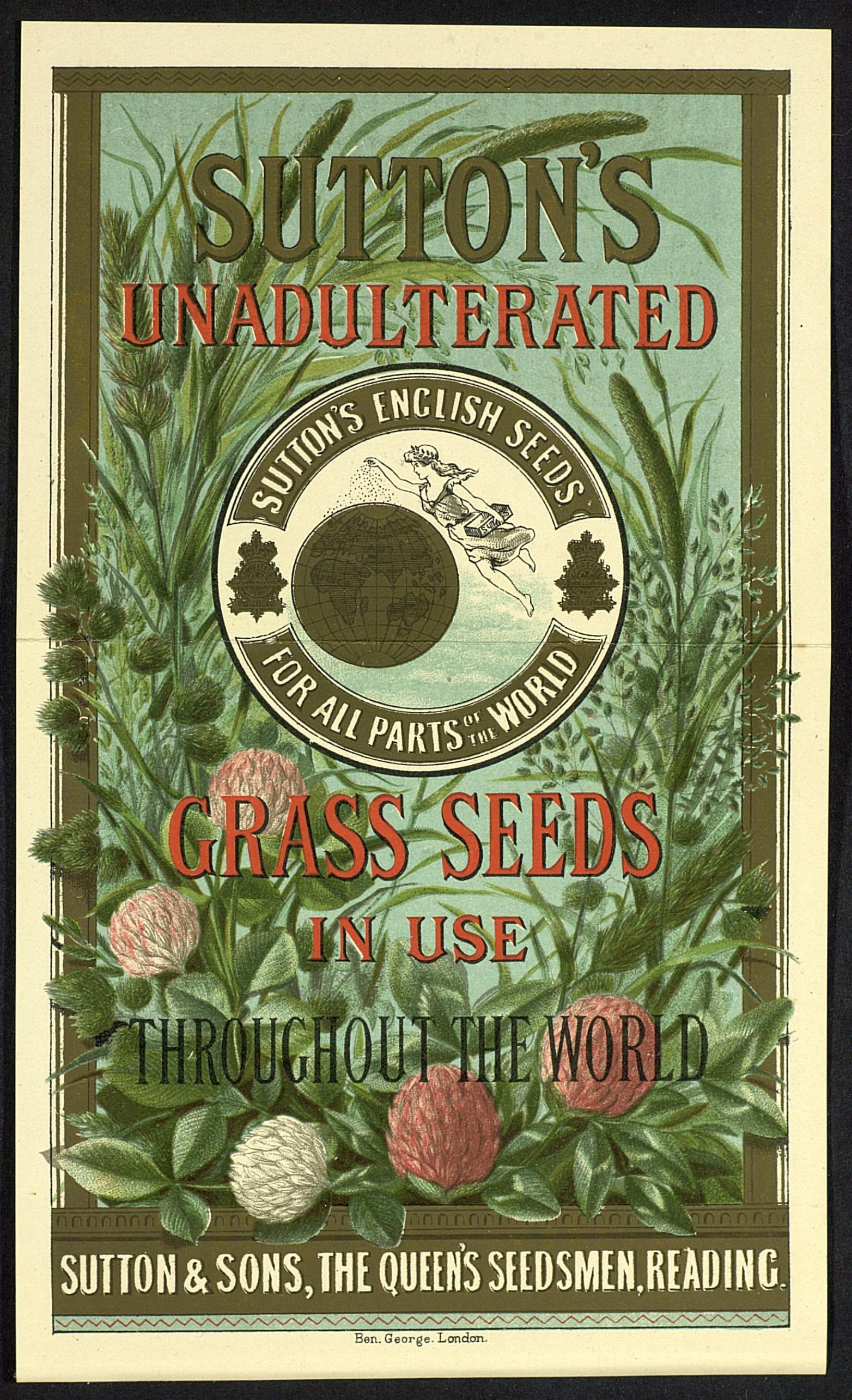
Grass seed advertisement, 1887

Suttons Seeds were founded in the Berkshire town of Reading in 1806 by John Sutton (1777–1863). Originally the company traded as corn merchants and were known as the 'House of Sutton'. In 1832 John Sutton was joined in the business by his sons, Martin Hope Sutton (1815–1901) and Alfred Sutton (1818–1897).

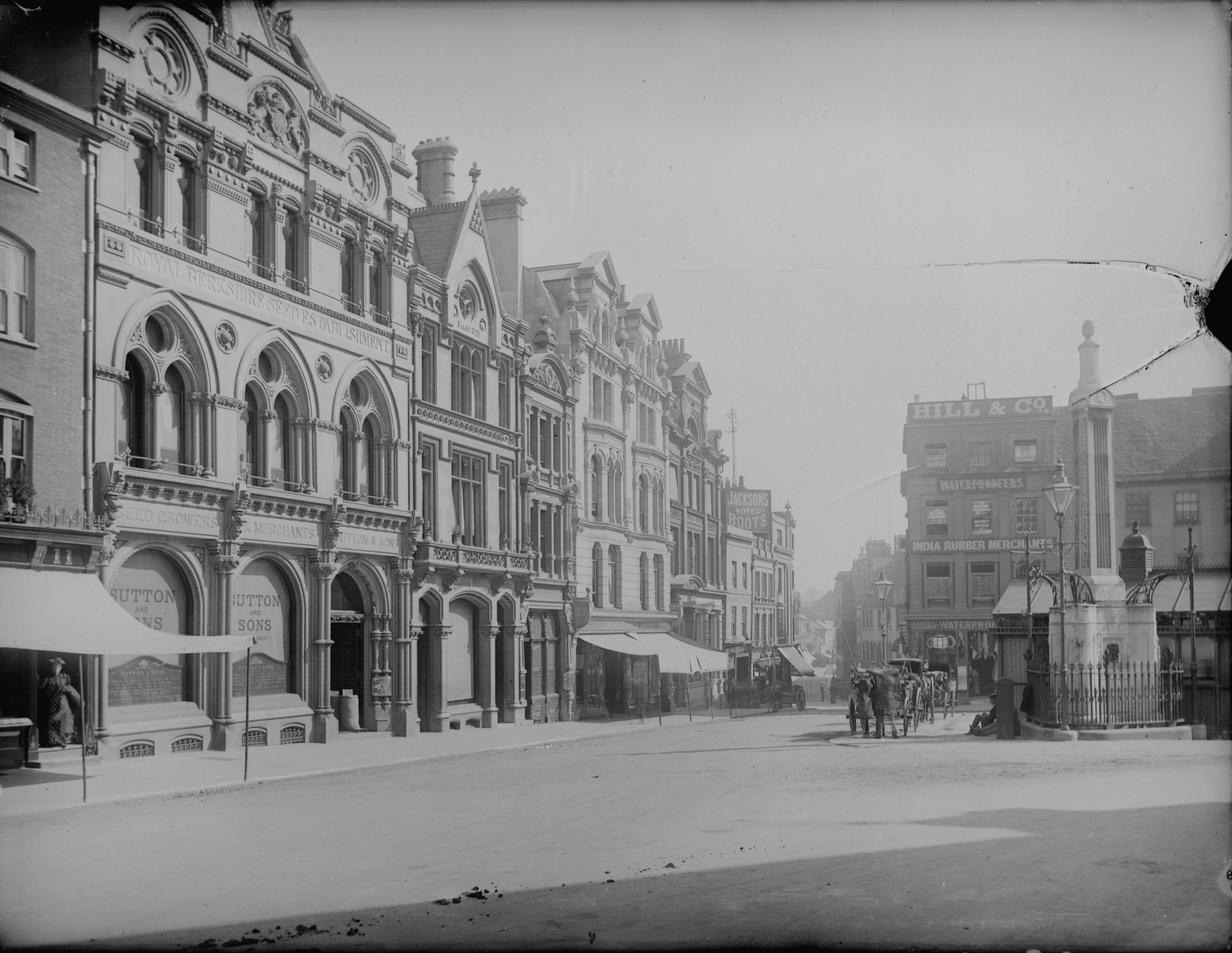
Premises on Market Place, Reading (left of image), c. 1890

In 1837, the business moved to Reading's Market Place, where the sons persuaded their father to expand into the flower and vegetable seed trade. From this time on the firm progressed and expanded rapidly, earning a reputation for supplying pure, unadulterated seed.

The Market Place shop occupied a prominent position overlooking the Saturday vegetable and general market. Martin Hope acquired nursery grounds in Queens Road along with a greenhouse. In 1836, aged 21 years, he became a partner and the 'House of Sutton' became Sutton & Son. By mid-1838 they began selling greenhouse plants, many of the bulbs coming from local nurseries, but some from the Netherlands.

Suttons established their own laboratory to test seeds for germination and purity in 1840. In the same year, the company became one of the first to take advantage of the opening of the Great Western Railway through Reading. The railway was responsible both for bringing in large consignments of seeds and bulbs, and for carrying outgoing mail orders to all parts of the country.

A branch was established in Calcutta, India in 1912, making it one of the earliest seed companies in India after Pune-based Pestonjee P. Pocha & Sons, established in 1884.

=== Royal patronage ===
Suttons received royal patronage in 1858, when Queen Victoria requested Martin Hope Sutton to supply seeds to the royal household. Suttons Seeds have held a Royal Warrant ever since, and were suppliers to Queen Elizabeth II.

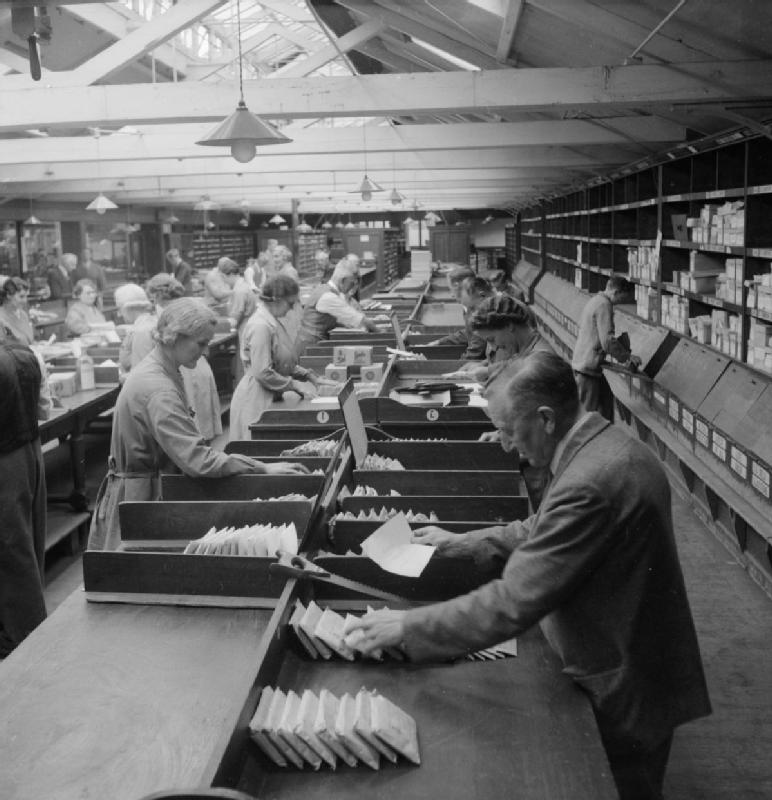
Packing seeds in Reading, 1945

In 1873, extensive new offices and warehouses replaced the original premises, albeit still fronting Market Place. These occupied a considerable part of central Reading. The premises included offices, different store rooms for various seeds and bulbs, an exhibition department, stables and even a works fire station. During the 1880s the company funded a Mission Room in Albert Road Reading and presumably employed a Mission Woman, Susan Warwick (Census 1881).

=== 20th century ===
In 1911, the company donated money towards the setting up of a new hall at the then University College Reading (later to become the University of Reading), providing half the funds for Wessex Hall (Brown, 2006).

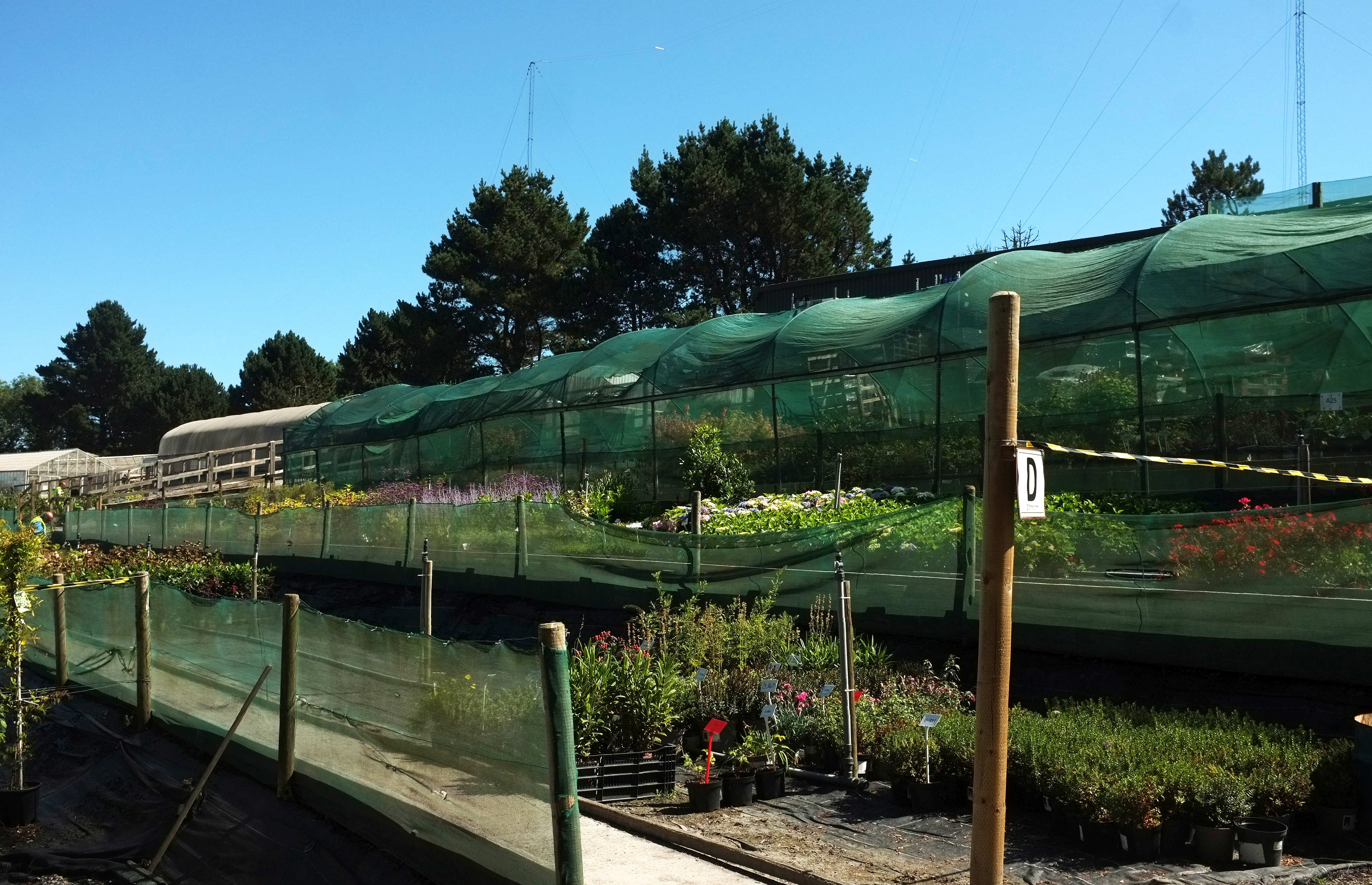
Trial nursery, Devon

In 1962, Suttons moved again to new show grounds and premises on the then main A4 road just to the east of Reading. In 1965, Suttons were the first company to offer foil packets to the amateur gardener in the UK. The company relocated from Reading to Torquay in the county of Devon in 1976 and in 1998 moved again to brand-new premises in the nearby town of Paignton.

In December 2014, the company was taken over by a management buyout.

The Museum of English Rural Life holds records for the company including accounts, administrative and commercial records, publications and advertising, international photographic records, records of exhibitions and personal records plus over 100 objects used and made by Suttons, including sacks, signs and seeds.

== References and sources ==
Sources

- Suttons Seeds (2005). Suttons Seeds - History. Retrieved August 12, 2005.
- Brown, C. (2006). Four Score & More. Reading: The University of Reading Press
- Family Tree of Frederick Chater-Jack Family Tree of Frederick Chater Jack (Tree Format)
- Family Tree of Frederick Chater-Jack Family Tree of Frederick Chater-Jack (List format)
