= Greig City Academy =

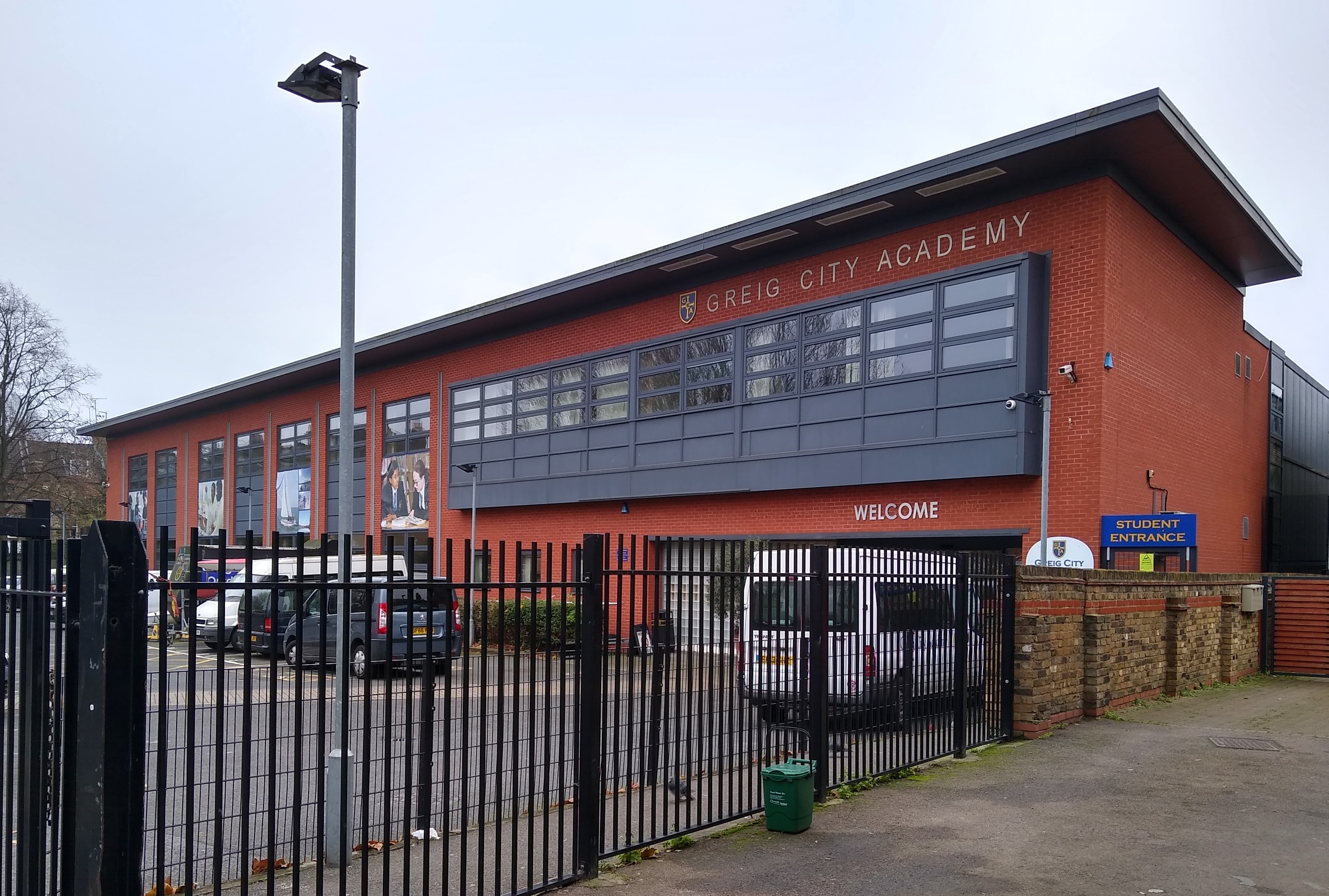

Location
- High Street; Hornsey, London, N8 7NU; England; 51°35′14″N 0°06′55″W

Information
- Type: Academy
- Religious affiliations: C of E welcoming all faiths and none
- Established: c. 2002
- Department for Education URN: 133386 Tables
- Ofsted: Reports
- Chair: Hugh Reynolds MA Oxon
- Principal: Paul Sutton OBE, MA, BSc (Hons)
- Gender: Mixed-sex
- Age: 11 to 19
- Enrolment: c. 1,100
- Sponsors: The Greig Trust and LDBS
- Website: www.greigcityacademy.co.uk

Greig City Academy is a mixed-sex secondary school in the London borough of Haringey. It has around 1,100 pupils on its roll.

As well as a main school, the Academy includes a thriving sixth form with links to Russell Group and other universities, as well as specialist sports and arts colleges. In 2024, the school reported that 82% of sixth formers moved on to higher education, including Oxford and Cambridge.

Its outdoor education programme is supported by the Greig Trust. The programme enables students across the school to experience activities such as abseiling, mountain biking, canoeing, kayaking, sailing, rock climbing and much more. In particular, the school has its own fleet of boats, several of which are moored in the Solent. The school was the first and only state school to compete in the 2017 Fastnet Race. It will compete in the 2019 race with crew members aged 13 and up. @GCASailingClub.

Greig City Academy is the only state school in Haringey to offer a classics course and a Latin GCSE. The school is also part of the Mandarin Excellence Programme.

The Greig Trust and the Church of England co-sponsor the Academy. David Greig, a successful local businessman, founded the Greig Trust in memory of his mother in 1949. The school receives sponsorship for STEM from the Worshipful Company of Tallow Chandlers Livery Company.

Sixth-former Montel Fagan-Jordan was awarded Young Sailor of the Year in January 2018.

For the 2025-26 Season, and having the year before being named ISC Young Skipper of the Year, GCA alumnus Kai Hockley was selected to represent the Great Britain SailGP Team.

== Achievements ==
The school has a strong STEM offering with teams of pupils winning the UK Robotics Championships and competing in the World Championships in Kentucky in 2015, 2016 and 2017. Several teams reached national level in 2018 and 2019. The school is working with associated primary schools to improve STEM across Haringey and has a STEM aptitude stream.

Greig City Academy is the only state school in the UK with a competitive sailing yacht.

Haringey Council's Outstanding for All Awards: The school's Robotics team won the Outstanding Achievement Award for STEM in 2018 and Joye Manyan won the Governor of the Year award. Head of Sixth Form, Jon Holt, won the Councillor Egan Outstanding Achievement Award 2017. Student Jackie Lee won the Achievement in the Arts Award 2017. The outdoor education programme won the Sports Award in 2016. A robotics team from the school won the STEM Award in 2016. Students in previous years have also won arts and sports awards.

The school is an affiliated school of the UK-wide Arkwright Scholarships and its students regularly secure the prestigious Arkwright Engineering Scholarships.

GCA was one of 10 schools selected to run the Falcon Initiative project (sponsored by the Royal Aeronautical Society and Boeing) - to design and build a fully functional flight training simulator for under £500.

The school's Progress 8 scores for GCSE 2016 place it in the top 2% of schools in the country for high achievers and girls.

== Notable alumni ==
Sports

- Donervon Daniels
- Kyle Walker-Peters
- Jamar Loza
- Dujon Sterling

Music

- Avelino (rapper)
- Not3s
- Mostack
