= Griggs =

Griggs may refer to:

== Places ==
- Griggs County, North Dakota, U.S.
- Mount Griggs (also known as Knife Peak Volcano), Katmai range, Alaska, U.S.

== Other uses ==
- Griggs (surname)
- Griggs v. Duke Power Co. (1971), an employment discrimination lawsuit in the United States
