= Gregory (given name) =

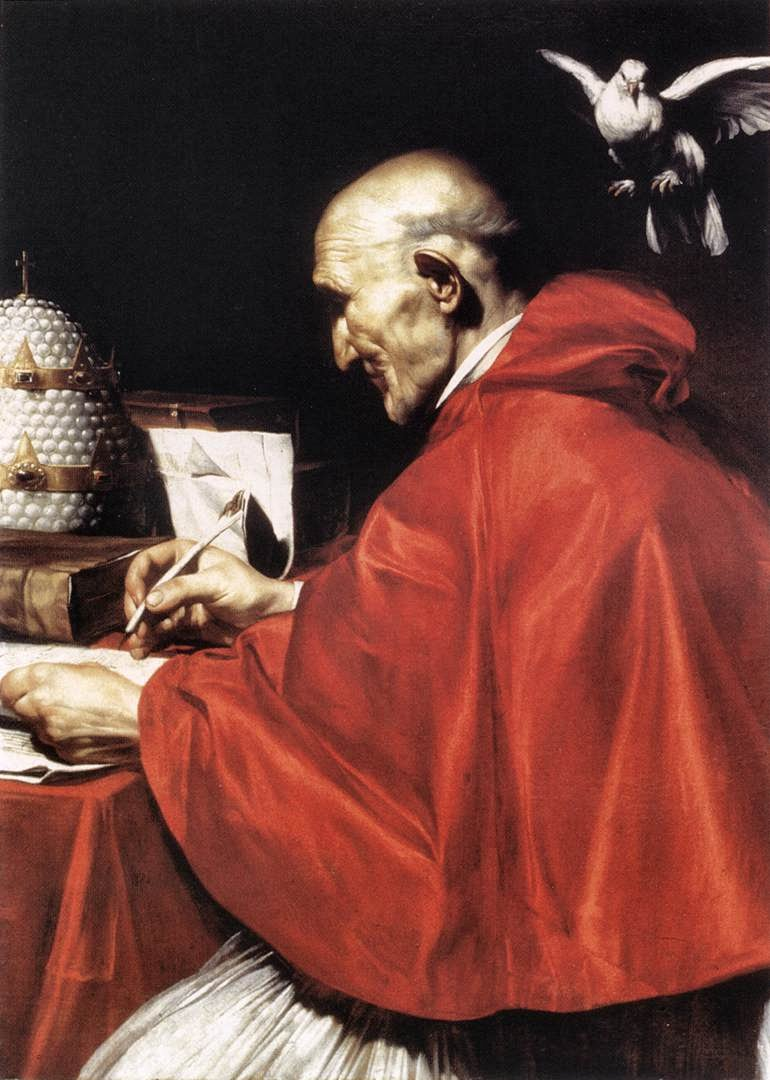
- Pope Gregory I (Gregory the Great)
- Pronunciation: /ˈɡrɛɡəri/
- Gender: Male

Origin
- Origin: Greek via Latin
- Meaning: watchful, alert
- Region of origin: worldwide

Other names
- Related names: Greg; Gregg; Grierson; Gregor; Greggor; Greggory; Gregorio; Grégoire; Grigory; Ory/Ori; Grzegorz; Ari; McGregor; MacGregor; McGreggor; MacGreggor

The masculine first name Gregory or Grégory derives from the Latin name "Gregorius", which came from the late Greek name "Γρηγόριος" (Grēgórios) meaning "watchful, alert" (derived from "ἐγείρω" "egeiro" meaning "to awaken, arouse"). (See also the egrḗgoroi or Watcher angels in Second Book of Enoch).

Through folk etymology, the name also became associated with Latin grex (stem greg–) meaning "flock" or "herd". This association with a shepherd who diligently guides his flock contributed to the name's popularity among monks and popes.

Sixteen popes and two antipopes have used the name Gregorius, starting with Pope Gregory I (Gregory the Great). It is tied with Benedict as the second-most popular name for popes, after John.

Although the name was uncommon in the early 20th century, after the popularity of the actor Gregory Peck it became one of the ten most common male names in the United States in the 1950s and has remained popular since.

== Name days ==
The Roman Catholic Church traditionally held the feast of Saint Gregory (the Great) on March 12, but changed it to September 3 in 1969. March 12 remains the name day for Gregory in most countries.

Gregory the Theologian (also known as Gregory of Nazianzus) is one of the Three Hierarchs (Ancient Greek: Οἱ Τρεῖς Ἱεράρχαι; Greek: Οι Τρεις Ιεράρχες). The other two are Basil the Great, also known as Basil of Caesarea and John Chrysostom. All three have separate feast days in January: Basil on January 1, Gregory on January 25, and Chrysostom on January 27.

== Forms in different languages ==
- Albanian: Grigor, Gregor, Gërgur
- Amharic: ጎርጎሪዯስ (Gorgorios)
- Arabic: جِرْجِير (Jirjir), جريج (Jurayj), جريجوري (Jirījūrī), غريغوري (Ghirīghūrī)
- Armenian: Գրիգոր (Western Armenian: Krikor; Eastern Armenian: Grigor)
- Belarusian: Рыгор (Ryhor)
- Bengali: গ্রেগরি (Grēgari)
- Bulgarian: Григор (Grigor)
- Catalan: Gregori
- Chinese: 格雷戈里 (Géléigēlǐ), 格里高利 (Gélǐgāolì)
- Croatian: Grgur, Grga or Grgo
- Czech: Řehoř
- Danish: Gregers
- Dutch: Gregoor, Gregorius
- English: Gregory, also Gregg, Greg
- Estonian: Reigo
- Faroese: Grækaris
- Finnish: Reijo or Reko
- French: Grégoire or Grégory
- Filipino Gregorio
- Georgian: გრიგოლი (Grigoli, Grigori)
- German: Gregor
- Greek: Γρηγόριος (Grigorios, Gri̱górios, Gregorios), Γρηγόρης (Grigoris, Gregoris)
- Gujarati: ગ્રેગરી (Grēgarī)
- Hebrew: גרגורי
- Hindi: ग्रेगोरी (Grēgōrī)
- Hungarian: Gergely, Gergő or Transylvanian: Gerő
- Icelandic: Gregor
- Indonesian: Gregorius, Gregory
- Irish: Gréagóir
- Italian: Gregorio
- Japanese: Guregori (グレゴリー)
- Kannada: ಗ್ರೆಗೊರಿ (Gregori)
- Korean: 그레고리오 (Geulegolio)
- Latin: Gregorius
- Latvian: Gregors
- Lithuanian: Grigalius, Grigas or Gregoras, Gregorijus
- Macedonian: Григориј, Grigorij
- Maltese: Girgor
- Marathi: ग्रेगोरी (Grēgōrī)
- Mongolian: Грегори, Gryegori
- Nepali: ग्रेगरी, Grēgarī
- Norwegian: Greger or Gregers
- Persian: گرگوری
- Polish: Grzegorz, diminutives Grześ, Grzesiu, Grzesio, Grzesiek
- Portuguese: Gregório
- Romanian: Grigore or Gligor
- Russian: Григорий (Grigoriy, Grigori, Grigory), with diminutives Гришa (Grisha), Гришка (Grishka)
- Scottish Gaelic: Griogair
- Scots: Gregor, Greig (diminutive)
- Serbian: Grigorije (Григорије), Gligorije (Глигорије), or Grgur (Гргур)
- Slovak: Gregor, Jerguš
- Slovene: Grega or Gregor
- Spanish: Gregorio
- Swedish: Greger
- Tamil: கிரிகோரி (Kirikōri)
- Telugu: గ్రెగొరీ (Gregorī)
- Thai: เกรกอรี or เกรกกอรี (Gregori, Greggori, Krekori, Krekkori)
- Turkish: Krikor or Grigor
- Ukrainian: Григорій (Hryhoriy), Гриць(ко) (Hryts(ko))
- Urdu: گریگوری
- Welsh: Grigor
- Yiddish: גרעגאָרי, Gregori

== Notable people named Gregory ==
=== Religious figures ===
- Pope Gregory (disambiguation)
- Patriarch Gregory (disambiguation)
- Saint Gregory (disambiguation)
- Gregory Asbestas (fl. 844–880), archbishop of Syracuse
- Gregory of Nin, 10th century Croatian bishop and reformer
- Gregory of Narek (c. 950–1003/1011), Armenian monk, philosopher, poet, and theologian
- Gregory (bishop of Győr) (died 1241), Hungarian prelate
- Gregory Palamas (c. 1296–1357 or 1359), archbishop, monk, and theologian
- Gregory of Rimini (c. 1300–1358), philosopher and theologian
- Gregory IV of Athens, Metropolitan of Athens
- Gregory (Afonsky) (1925–2008), Archbishop of Sitka and Alaska
- Gregory Karotemprel (born 1933), Syro–Malabar bishop
- Gregory Greiten (born c. 1964/1965), an American Catholic priest

=== Aristocrats ===
- Gregory (exarch), Exarch of Ravenna 664–677
- Gregory of Benevento (died 739/740), Italian duke
- Gregory I of Naples, Duke of Naples (739–755)
- Gregory II of Naples, Duke of Naples (767–794)
- Gregory III of Naples, Duke of Naples (864–870)
- Gregory IV of Naples, Duke of Naples (898–915)

=== Other ===
- Gregory Abbott (born 1954), American composer, musician, singer, and record producer
- Gregory Abowd (born 1964), American computer scientist
- Gregory H. Adamian (1926–2015), American college administrator and lawyer
- Gregory Agboneni (born 1948), Nigerian military administrator and soldier
- Grégory Alldritt (born 1997), French rugby player
- Gregory Amenoff (born 1948), American painter
- Gregory Areshian (1949–2020), Armenian–American archaeologist and historian
- Grégory Arganese (born 1982), French rugby player
- Gregory Arkhurst (born 1976), Ivorian swimmer
- Grégory Arnolin (born 1980), French soccer player
- Gregory Asgarali (born 1947), Trinidadian cricket player
- Gregory Balestrero (born 1947), American industrial engineer
- Gregory Bateson (1904–1980), English anthropologist and linguist
- Grégory Bauge (born 1985), French racing cyclist
- Gregory Baum (1923–2017), German–born Canadian priest and theologian
- Gregory Bayne (born 1972), South African rower
- Gregory Beale (born 1949), American professor and theologian
- Gregory Bedny (1938–2018), Ukrainian–American psychologist
- Gregory Beecroft (born 1952), American actor
- Gregory Benford (born 1941), American astrophysicist and author
- Gregory Benko (born 1952), Australian fencer
- Gregory Beroza (born 1959), American professor and seismologist
- Gregory Berríos (born 1979), Puerto Rican volleyball player
- Gregory Betts (born 1975), Canadian poet and professor
- Gregory Beylkin (born 1953), Russian–American mathematician
- Gregory J. Bonann (born 1952), American lifeguard, showrunner, and television producer
- Gregory Brathwaite (born 1969), Barbadian cricket umpire
- Gregory Brenes (born 1988), Costa Rican cyclist
- Gregory Brigman (born 1987), American paralympic soccer player and referee
- Gregory H. Botz (born 1962), American physician
- Grégory Bourdy (born 1982), French golfer
- Grégory Bourillon (born 1984), French soccer player
- Gregory Buchakjian (born 1971), Lebanese filmmaker, photographer, and art historian
- Gregory Burke (born 1968), Scottish playwright
- Gregory Cahill (born 1982), American filmmaker and film producer
- Gregory Carigiet (born 1987), Swiss luger
- Grégory Cerdan (born 1982), French soccer player
- Gregory Chaitin (born 1947), Argentine–American computer scientist and mathematician
- Gregory Chamitoff (born 1962), American astronaut
- Gregory Chaney (born 1981), American politician
- Gregory Charles (born 1968), Canadian musician and singer
- Gregory S. Chirikjian (born 1966), American mathematician and roboticist
- Gregory Chow (born 1930), Chinese–American economist
- Gregory R. Ciottone (born 1965), American physician
- Gregory Clifton (born 1968), American football player
- Gregory Coates (born 1961), American artist
- Gregory Cochran (born 1953), American anthropologist and author
- Gregory Colbert (born 1960), Canadian photographer
- Gregory Corbitt (born 1971), Australian field hockey player
- Gregory Corso (1930–2001), American poet
- Gregory Costantino (born 1960), American politician
- Grégory Coupet (born 1972), French soccer player
- Gregory B. Craig (born 1945), American lawyer and politician
- Gregory Crewdson (born 1962), American photographer
- Gregory Cusack (born 1943), American politician
- Gregory Damons (born 1995), South African soccer player
- Gregory Daniel (born 1994), American cyclist
- Gregory Deighan (born 1939), Canadian politician
- Gregory Doran (born 1958), English stage director
- Grégory Dubois (born 1975), French ice hockey player
- Grégory Dufer (born 1981), Belgian soccer player
- Grégory Dufrennes (born 1983), French soccer player
- Gregory Duralev (born 1979), Russian bodybuilder, businessman, and economist
- Gregory Durand (born 1977), French speed skater
- Grégory Duruz (born 1977), Swiss soccer player
- Grégory Dutil (born 1980), French soccer player
- Gregory Echenique (born 1990) Venezuelan basketball player
- Gregory W. Engle (born 1954), German–born American diplomat
- Gregory Euclide (born 1974), American painter and teacher
- Gregory A. Feest (born 1956), American major general
- Gregory L. Fenves (born 1957), American professor and structural engineer
- Gregory S. Forbes (born 1950), American meteorologist
- Gregory Franchi (born 1982), Belgian racing driver
- Gregory Frost (born 1951), American novelist
- Gregory Gagnon (born 1972), American major general
- Grégory Galbadon (born 1973), French politician
- Gregory Galloway (born 1962), American writer
- Gregory G. Garre (born 1964), American lawyer and politician
- Grégory Gaultier (born 1982), French squash player
- Gregory Gaye (1900–1993), Russian–American actor
- Gregory Gillespie (1936–2000), American painter
- Gregory Goodridge (born 1971), Barbadian soccer player
- Gregory Gourdet (born 1975), American chef and restaurateur
- Gregory Grefenstette (born 1956), French–American computer scientist and professor
- Gregory Haddad (born 1966), American politician
- Gregory Haerr (born 1957), American entrepreneur
- Gregory Haimovsky (born 1926), Russian pianist and writer
- Gregory Halpern (born 1977), American photographer and teacher
- Gregory J. Harbaugh (born 1956), American astronaut and astronautical engineer
- Gregory Harrison (born 1950), American actor
- Gregory T. Haugan (born 1931), American author
- Gregory P. Hawkins (born 1957), American lawyer, teacher, and writer
- Gregory Heisler (born 1954), American photographer
- Gregory Helms (born 1974), American professional wrestler
- Gregory Henriquez (born 1963), Canadian architect
- Gregory Herbert (1947–1978), American saxophonist
- Gregory M. Herek (born 1954), American author and professor
- Gregory Herman (born 1972), American fashion designer
- Gregory Hines (1946–2003), American actor, choreographer, dancer, and singer
- Gregory Hoblit (born 1944), American filmmaker and television producer
- Gregory Hogeboom (born 1982), Canadian ice hockey player
- Gregory Huber (born 1956), American judge, lawyer, and politician
- Gregory C. Huffman (born 1967), American rear admiral
- Gregory Iron (born 1986), American professional wrestler
- Gregory Isaacs (1951–2010), Jamaican musician
- Gregory Alan Isakov (born 1979), South African–born American singer and songwriter
- Gregory Itzin (1948–2022), American actor
- Gregory Jaczko (born 1970), American physicist and politician
- Gregory Jagenburg (born 1957), American swimmer
- Gregory Jarvis (1944–1986), American astronaut and engineer
- Gregory Jbara (born 1961), American actor and singer
- Gregory Kaidanov (born 1959), Ukrainian–born American chess grandmaster
- Gregory Kats (born 1959), American businessman and environmentalist
- Gregory G. Katsas (born 1964), American judge
- Gregory Kealey (born 1948), Canadian historian
- Gregory Kelley (1944–1961), American figure skater
- Gregory Keyes (born 1963), American writer
- Gregory Kimble (1917–2006), American professor and psychologist
- Gregory Kirchhoff (born 1992), German filmmaker
- Gregory Kolovakos (1951–1990), American activist and literary translator
- Gregory Kondos (1923–2021), American painter
- Gregory Kotrotsios (born 1984), Greek basketball player
- Gregory Kramer (born 1952), American author, composer, inventor, and meditation teacher
- Gregory Kuisch (born 2000), Dutch soccer player
- Gregory Kunde (born 1954), American operatic tenor
- Gregory La Cava (1892–1952), American filmmaker
- Grégory Labille (born 1968), French politician
- Gregory Lavelle (born 1963), American politician
- Gregory Lekhtman (born 1946), Russian–Canadian entrepreneur and inventor
- Grégory Lemarchal (1983–2007), French singer
- Grégory Levasseur (born 1979), French filmmaker and film producer
- Gregory Levey (born 1978), Canadian entrepreneur and writer
- Gregory Liebenberg (born 2001), Zimbabwean cricket player
- Gregory T. Linteris (born 1957), American scientist
- Gregory Loewen (born 1966), Canadian philosopher
- Gregory Lomayesva (born 1971), American painter and sculptor
- Gregory Loselle (born 1963), American dramatist, poet, and teacher
- Gregory Maguire (born 1954), American novelist
- Gregory Mahler (born 1950), American political scientist
- Gregory Mahlokwana (born 1994), South African cricket player
- Gregory Mairs (born 1994), English badminton player
- Gregory Mangin (1907–1979), American tennis player
- Gregory John Mansour (born 1955), Current eparch of the Maronite Catholic Eparchy of Saint Maron of Brooklyn
- Gregory Markopoulos (1928–1992), American filmmaker
- Gregory P. McGuckin (born 1961), American politician
- Gregory Meeks (born 1953), American lawyer and politician
- Gregory Melleuish (born 1954), Australian professor
- Gregory Merriman (born 1988), Australian figure skater
- Gregory Mertens (1991–2015), Belgian soccer player
- Gregory Mertl (born 1969), American composer
- Gregory Messam (born 1973), Jamaican soccer player
- Gregory Mitchell (born 1969), American politician
- Gregory Morava (born 1959), American handball player
- Gregory Mosher (born 1949), American filmmaker, stage director, and stage producer
- Gregory Motton (born 1961), English author and playwright
- Grégory Mounis (born 1985), French rugby player
- Gregory Mulamba (born 1986), South African soccer player
- Gregory Nagy (born 1942), Hungarian–Canadian professor
- Gregory Nava (born 1949), American filmmaker and film producer
- Gregory Nelson (born 1988), Dutch soccer player
- Gregory J. Newell (born 1949), American diplomat and politician
- Grégory Nicot (born 1982), French soccer player
- Gregory Norminton (born 1976), English novelist
- Gregory O'Brien (born 1961), New Zealand painter and poet
- Gregory O'Donoghue (1951–2005), Irish poet
- Gregory O'Kane (born 1972), Irish coach and hurler
- Gregory O'Kelly (born 1941), Australian prelate
- Gregory Olsen (born 1945), American engineer, entrepreneur, and scientist
- Gregory Orfalea (born 1949), American writer
- Gregory V. Palmer (born 1954), American bishop
- Gregory Pardlo (born 1968), American poet, professor, and writer
- Gregory Peck (1916–2003), American actor
- Gregory Pence (born 1948), American philosopher
- Gregory Perino (1914–2005), American archaeologist and author
- Gregory Perkel (born 1939), Ukrainian–born American artist
- Gregory Petsko (born 1948), American biochemist
- Gregory Peyser (born 1983), American lacrosse player
- Gregory Pikus (1923–1998), Soviet theoretical physicist
- Gregory Pinas (born 1984), Dutch basketball player
- Gregory Pokie (born 1987), Surinamese soccer player
- Gregory Polanco (born 1991), Dominican baseball player
- Gregory Porter (born 1971), American actor, singer, and songwriter
- Gregory Rabassa (1922–2016), American literary translator
- Gregory Raleigh (born 1961), American entrepreneur and inventor
- Gregory Randolph (born 1972), American cyclist
- Grégory Rast (born 1980), Swiss road bicycle racer
- Gregory Ratoff (1893–1960), Russian–born American actor and filmmaker
- Gregory F. Rayburn (born 1958), American businessman
- Gregory Razran (1901–1973), Russian–American professor
- Gregory Reinhart (born 1951), American operatic bass
- Gregory Retallack (born 1951), Australian author, geologist, and paleontologist
- Gregory Reyes (born 1962), American businessman
- Gregory Rickel (born 1963), American bishop
- Gregory Rockman (born 1959), South African police officer and politician
- Gregory Rodrigues (born 1992), Brazilian mixed martial artist
- Gregory Rogers (1957–2013), Australian illustrator and writer
- Gregory Rokosh (born 1942), Canadian rower
- Gregory Rousseau (born 2000), American football player
- Gregory Rudelson (born 1988), Israeli judoka and belt wrestler
- Gregory Rusland (born 1959), Surinamese politician
- Gregory Russell (born 1951), Canadian volleyball player
- Gregory Ruth (1939–1974), American wrestler
- Gregory Saavedra (born 1989), Chilean soccer player
- Gregory Salcido (born 1968), American educator and politician
- Gregory Sambou (born 1994), Gambian soccer player
- Gregory Santos (born 1999), Dominican baseball player
- Gregory Scarpa (1928–1994), American caporegime and hitman
- Gregory Schaken (born 1989), Dutch soccer player
- Gregory Schulte (born 1958), American diplomat
- Gregory Scofield (born 1966) Canadian Métis beadwork artist, dramatist, and poet
- Gregory Shambrook (born 1953), Australian rugby player
- Gregory Short (1938–1999), American composer, educator, and pianist
- Gregory Shvedov (born 1976), Russian activist and journalist
- Gregory Sierra (1937–2021), American actor
- Gregory Siff (born 1977), American actor, writer, and visual artist
- Gregory Simons (born 1958), Bermudian sprinter
- Gregory Sivashinsky (born 1945), Russian–Israeli professor
- Gregory Soto (born 1995), Dominican baseball player
- Gregory Spaid (born 1946), American artist
- Gregory Spatz (born 1964), American author and musician
- Gregory Sporleder (born 1964), American actor and filmmaker
- Gregory Springer (born 1961), American rower
- Gregory Stephanopoulos (born 1950), American chemical engineer
- Gregory Sterling (born 1954), American academic and religious scholar
- Gregory N. Stivers (born 1960), American judge
- Gregory Stroud (1892–1974), English operatic baritone
- Gregory Strydom (born 1984), Zimbabwean cricket player
- Gregory Stump (born 1954), American linguist and professor
- Gregory Swallow, American politician
- Grégory Tadé (born 1986), French soccer player
- Grégory Tafforeau (born 1976), French soccer player
- Gregory Tardy (born 1966), American clarinetist and saxophonist
- Grégory Tarlé (born 1983), French ice hockey coach
- Gregory Tesser (born 1946), English sports broadcaster and writer
- Gregory Tilyard (born 1932), Australian cricket player
- Gregory Tucker (born 1957), American politician
- Grégory Turpin (born 1980), French singer and songwriter
- Gregory Ulmer (born 1944), American professor
- Grégory Ursule (born 1977), French soccer player
- Gregory Vajda (born 1973), Hungarian clarinetist, composer, and conductor
- Gregory Vargas (born 1986), Venezuelan basketball player
- Gregory Venables (born 1949), English bishop
- Gregory L. Verdine (born 1959), American entrepreneur, professor, chemical biologist, and venture capitalist
- Grégory Vignal (born 1981), French soccer player and coach
- Gregory A. Voth (born 1959), American professor and theoretical chemist
- Gregory Walcott (1928–2015), American actor
- Gregory Wannier (1911–1983), Swiss physicist
- Gregory Ward (born 1955), American academic, linguist, and professor
- Gregory Wasson (born 1958), American businessman
- Gregory Wheeler (born 1968), American logician, philosopher, and computer scientist
- Gregory Williscroft (born 1966), Australian–born Canadian volleyball player
- Gregory Wilpert (born 1965), German activist
- Gregory Winter (born 1951), English molecular biologist
- Gregory Wong (born 1978), Hong Kong actor
- Gregory Woods (born 1953), Egyptian–born English academic and poet
- Gregory Wüthrich (born 1994), Swiss soccer player
- Gregory Yeghikian (1880–1951), Iranian–Armenian playwright and historian
- Gregory Yob (1945–2005), American computer game designer
- Gregory Zuckerman (born 1966), American author and journalist

== Fictional characters ==
- Gregory, protagonist of the video game Five Nights at Freddy's: Security Breach
- Gregory, in the comic book series and television series, both titled The Walking Dead
- Gregory Heffley, protagonist of the Diary of a Wimpy Kid series
- Gregory House, the main character of House
- Gregory Bridgerton, the youngest son of Bridgertons and protagonist of On the Way to the Wedding by Julia Quinn
- Gregory, a movie-exclusive South Park character from South Park: Bigger, Longer & Uncut
- Gregory Eddie, male protagonist of the sitcom Abbott Elementary

== See also ==
- Greg
- Gregg (given name)
- Gregor
- Grigory
- Grzegorz (given name)
