= Grzegorz =

- Pronunciation: [ˈɡʐɛɡɔʐ]
- Gender: male

Origin
- Origin: Greek via Latin
- Meaning: "watchful", "alert"
- Region of origin: Poland

Other names
- Related names: English: Gregory

Grzegorz (Polish pronunciation: [ˈɡʐɛɡɔʐ]) is a Polish given name, equivalent to English Gregory. Its diminutive forms include Grześ, Grzesiek, and Grzesio; augmentative – Grzechu.

Individuals named Grzegorz may choose to celebrate their name day on 2, 4 and 10 January; 12 March; 24 and 26 April; 4, 9, 25 May; 13 June; 25 August; 3 and 30 September; 17, 20, 23, and 28 November and 10, 19 and 24 December.

Notable people with the name include:

- Grzegorz of Sanok (1407–1477), archbishop, poet, and humanist
- Grzegorz Braun (born 1967), Polish MP
- Grzegorz Cebula (born 1981), DJ and record producer known professionally as C-BooL
- Grzegorz Ciechowski (1957–2001), rock singer and film score composer
- Grzegorz Fitelberg (1879–1953), conductor, violinist and composer
- Grzegorz Gajewski (born 1985), chess grandmaster
- Grzegorz Gawlik (born 1980), traveler and mountaineer
- Grzegorz Hajdarowicz (born 1965), entrepreneur, film producer and publisher
- Grzegorz Halama (born 1970), parodist and cabaret actor
- Grzegorz Hyży (born 1987), singer-songwriter
- Grzegorz Kacała (born 1966), rugby player
- Grzegorz Karnas (born 1972), jazz vocalist, music producer, linguist and photographer
- Grzegorz Kaszak (born 1964), bishop
- Grzegorz Kaźmierczak (born 1964), poet, singer and record producer
- Grzegorz Kosok (born 1986), volleyball player
- Grzegorz Krychowiak (born 1990), football player
- Grzegorz Lato (born 1950), football player
- Grzegorz Łomacz (born 1987), volleyball player
- Grzegorz Małecki (born 1967), diplomat and senior official
- Grzegorz Miecugow (1955–2017), journalist and television personality
- Grzegorz Napieralski (born 1974), politician
- Grzegorz Nowak (conductor) (born 1951), conductor
- Grzegorz Nowak (rower) (born 1954), rower
- Grzegorz Pojmański (born 1959), astronomer
- Grzegorz Przemyk (1964–1983), Polish student and poet, victim of police brutality
- Grzegorz Rasiak (born 1979), football player
- Grzegorz Rosiński (born 1941), comic book artist
- Grzegorz Schetyna (born 1963), politician
- Grzegorz Stec (born 1955), painter, graphic artist and poet
- Grzegorz Sztolcman (born 1962), Polish politician and physician
- Grzegorz Turnau (born 1967), composer, pianist, poet and singer
- Grzegorz Wagner (born 1965), volleyball player and coach
- Grzegorz Walasek (born 1976), speedway rider
- Grzegorz Wrochna (born 1962), physicist
- Grzegorz Zengota (born 1988), speedway rider

== See also ==
- Polish patronymic surnames:
  - Grzegorzewski
  - Grzegorczyk
