= Gregorio López =

Gregorio López may refer to:

- Gregorio López-Bravo (1923–1985), Spanish politician, minister of foreign affairs between 1969 and 1973
- Gregorio López y Fuentes (1895–1966), Mexican novelist, poet, and journalist
- Gregorio López (handballer) (1951–1987), Spanish handball player
- Gregorio López (hermit) (1542–1596), Spanish hermit in New Spain
- Gregorio López (jurist) (1496–1560), Spanish humanist and lawyer in the colonial Americas, president of the Council of the Indies

== See also ==
- Luo Wenzao (c. 1610s–1691), first Chinese Catholic bishop, also known as "Gregorio Lopez" in Spanish
