= Grigoriadis =

Grigoriadis or Gregoriades (Greek: Γρηγοριάδης) is a Greek surname, deriving from the given name Grigorios (Gregory). The feminine form is Grigoriadi (Γρηγοριάδη) or Grigoriadou/Gregoriadou (Γρηγοριάδου). Notable people with the surname include:

- Afroditi Grigoriadou (1931–2020), Greek actress
- Aristeidis Grigoriadis (born 1985), Greek swimmer
- Elpida Grigoriadou (born 1971), Greek rower
- Gregory Gregoriadis (1934–2026), Greek biochemist
- Mary Grigoriadis (born 1942), American artist
- Michail Grigoriadis, Ottoman Greek official, Prince of Samos
- Neokosmos Grigoriadis (1879–1967), Greek general and politician
- Solon Grigoriadis (1912–1994), Greek naval officer, journalist, and politician
- Vanessa Grigoriadis, American journalist
