= Grzegorczyk =

Korczak coat of arms used by some of Grzegorczyk family

Grzegorczyk (Polish pronunciation: [ˈɡʐɛˈɡɔrt͡ʂɨk]) is a Polish patronymic surname developed from the given name Grzegorz (Gregory).

Archaic feminine forms are Grzegorczykowa (by husband), Grzegorczykówna (by father); they still can be used colloquially. Some of them use Korczak coat of arms. It might be transliterated as Gregorczyk. Notable people with this surname include the following:

- Andrzej Grzegorczyk (1922–2014), Polish logician, mathematician, philosopher and ethicist
- Renata Maria Grzegorczykowa (born 1931), Polish philologist and an expert in polonist linguistics
- Robert Grzegorczyk (born 1973), Polish figure skater
- Ryszard Grzegorczyk (1939–2021), Polish footballer
- Sylwia Gregorczyk-Abram (born 1982), Polish attorney and social activist
- Tomasz Grzegorczyk (born 1981), Polish football manager and player
- Władysław Grzegorczyk (1905–1981), Polish Righteous Among the Nations

== See also ==
- Grzegorczyk hierarchy, hierarchy of functions used in computability theory
- Grzegorzewski
- Hryhorchuk
