= Gregorini =

Gregorini (Italian pronunciation: [ɡreɡoˈriːni]) is an Italian surname, derived from the name Gregorio. The Grégorini variant is the French rendering of the original Italian surname.

Notable people with this surname include:

- Damien Grégorini (born 1979), French football player
- Francesca Gregorini (born 1968), Italian-American director
- Giorgio Gregorini, Italian makeup artist
- Loretta Gregorini (born 1948), Italian astronomer
- Silvia Gregorini (born 1983), Italian rhythmic gymnast
