= Grzegorzewski =

Grzegorzewski (feminine Grzegorzewska) is a Polish patronymic surname developed from the given name Grzegorz (Gregory). Notable people with the surname include:

- Adam Grzegorzewski (born 1998), Polish equestrian
- Filip Grzegorzewski, Polish diplomat
- Gaja Grzegorzewska (born 1980), Polish novelist
- Jakub Grzegorzewski (born 1982), Polish footballer
- Maria Grzegorzewska (1887–1967), Polish educator
- Wioletta Grzegorzewska (born 1974), Polish poet and writer

== See also ==
- Grzegorczyk
