= Gregorio =

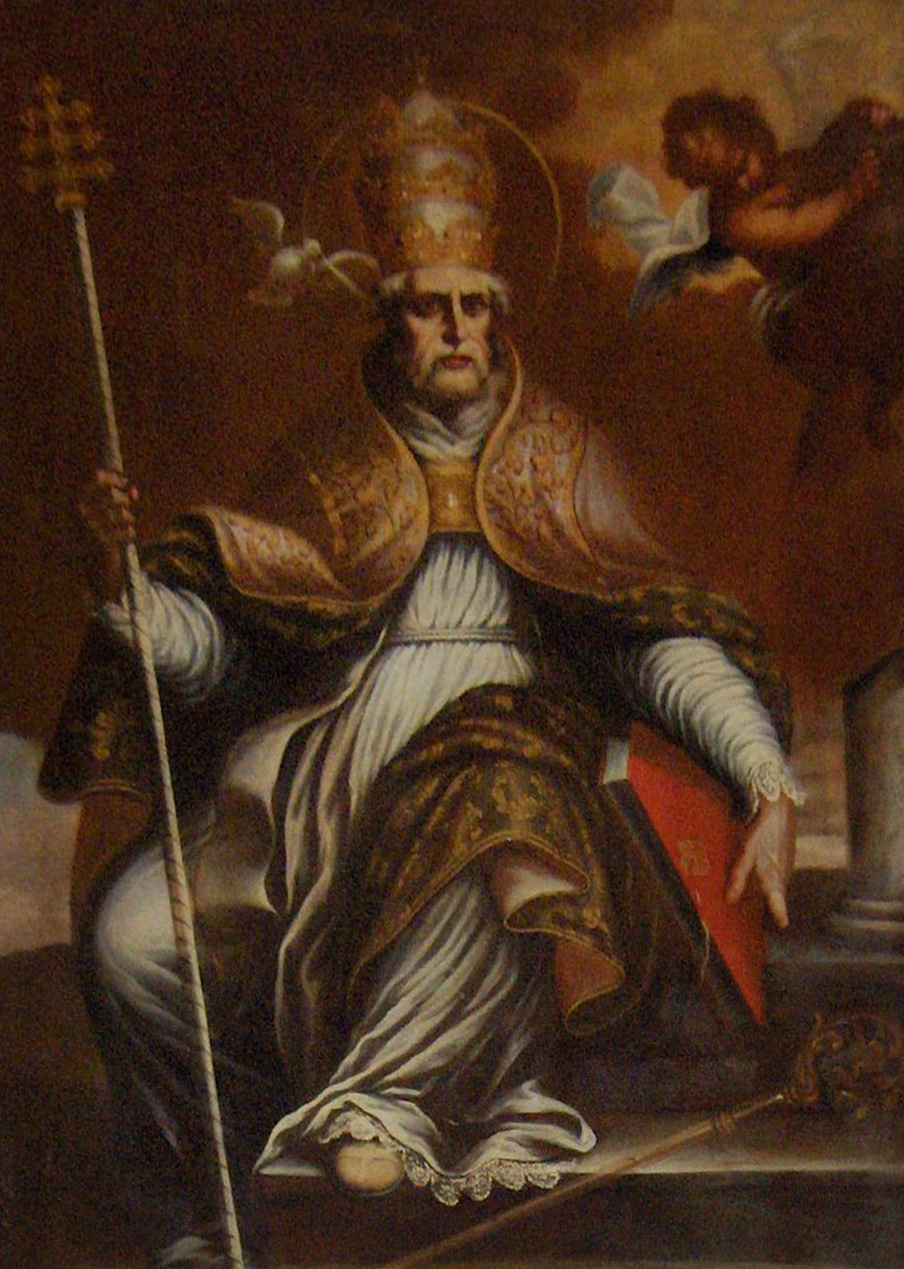
St. Gregorius I Magnus; Oratory of St. Catherine of Alexandria; Church of S. Ambrogio, Alassio, Italy

Gregorio is a masculine given name and a surname. It may refer to:

== Given name ==
- Gregorio Aglipay (1860–1940), Filipino revolutionary and first supreme bishop of the Philippine Independent Church
- Gregorio Álvarez (historian) (1889–1986), Argentine historian, physician and writer
- Gregorio Conrado Álvarez (1925–2016), Uruguayan army general and de facto President of Uruguay from 1981 until 1985
- Gregorio S. Araneta (1869–1930), Filipino lawyer, businessman and nationalist
- Gregorio Benito (1946–2020), Spanish retired footballer
- Gregorio C. Brillantes, Filipino writer
- Gregorio di Cecco (c. 1390–after 1424), Italian painter
- Gregório Nunes Coronel (c. 1548– c. 1620), Portuguese theologian, writer and preacher
- Gregorio Cortez (1875–1916), Mexican-American tenant farmer and folk hero
- Gregorio De Ferrari (c. 1647–1726), Italian painter
- Gregorio De Gregori (fl. 1496–1527), printer in Renaissance Venice
- Gregorio del Pilar (1875–1899), Philippine Revolutionary Forces general during the Philippine Revolution and the Philippine–American War
- Gregorio López (handballer) (1951–1987), Spanish handball player
- Gregorio López (jurist) (1496–1560), president of the Council of the Indies
- Gregorio López-Bravo y Castro (1923–1985), Spanish politician, Minister of Foreign Affairs between 1969 and 1973
- Gregorio López y Fuentes (1895–1966), Mexican novelist, poet and journalist
- Gregorio Luperón (1839–1897), Dominican military and political leader, President of the Dominican Republic from 1879 to 1880
- Gregorio Marañón (1887–1960), Spanish physician, scientist, historian, writer and philosopher
- Gregório de Matos (1636–1696), colonial Brazilian poet
- Gregorio Pérez (born 1948), Uruguayan football manager and former player
- Gregorio Petit (born 1984), Major League Baseball player from Venezuela
- Gregorio Ricci-Curbastro (1853–1925), Italian mathematician, inventor of tensor calculus
- Gregorio Rodríguez (footballer) (born 2000), Argentine footballer
- Gregorio Salvador Caja (1927-2020), Spanish linguist
- Gregorio Manuel Salvador (born 1981), Equatoguinean footballer

== Surname ==
- Guillermo Gregorio (born 1941), Argentine musician
- John T. Gregorio (1928−2013), American politician
- Mateus Gregório (born 1993), Brazilian weightlifter
- Rose Gregorio (born 1934), American actress
- Rossella Gregorio (born 1990), Italian sabre fencer

== See also ==
- De Gregorio, also DeGregorio, Di Gregorio and DiGregorio; some of these entries consider Gregorio to be the surname
- Gregory (given name)
