= Spaid =

Spaid is a surname. Notable people with the surname include:

- Arthur R. M. Spaid (1866–1936), American educator, school administrator, lecturer, and writer
- Gregory Spaid (born 1946), American artist
- Sue Spaid (born 1961), American curator and philosopher
