= Grigoriy Plaskov =

Soviet artillery lieutenant

- Григорий Пласков
- Plaskov during World War Two

Personal details
- Born: Grigoriy Davydovich Plaskov; December 8 or 20, 1898 Minsk, Russian Empire
- Died: November 2, 1972 Moscow, Soviet Union
- Resting place: Vvedenskoye Cemetery
- Spouse: Dora Grigorievna
- Children: Yuri and Asya
- Awards: List of awards: Order of the Red Banner (4); Order of Lenin (2); Order of Kutuzov; Order of Bohdan Khmelnitsky; Medal for the Defense of Moscow; Medal for the Liberation of Warsaw; Medal for the Capture of Berlin; Medal for the Victory over Germany in the Great Patriotic War 1941–1945

Military service
- Allegiance: Red Guard (1917–1918); Red Army (1918–1952)
- Years of service: 1917–1952
- Rank: Lieutenant General of Artillery
- Commands: Taurida Military District
- Battles/wars: List of battles/wars: Russian Civil War; October Revolution; Winter War; World War II; Battle of Moscow; Battle of Orsha; Vistula–Oder Offensive; Battle of Berlin

Grigoriy Davydovich Plaskov (Russian: Григорий Давидович Пласков), also known as G.D. Plaskov and Hirsch Plaskov, (Note: In several texts, Grigoriy is referred to as "Hirsch" or "Girsch." Both of these originate from translations of "Grisha," a Russian nickname for Grigoriy.) was a Lieutenant General of Artillery for the Soviet Union. He is known for being one of the most prominent Jews in the Red Army.

== Early life ==
Plaskov was born in December 1898 in Minsk to a Jewish family. Plaskov's father was a brewer. In 1911, he graduated from the local yeshiva and was employed as a metal worker in "Mateushik and Sons," an iron foundry.

Plaskov joined the Red Guard in October 1917 and, after joining the Red Army in May 1918, fought in the Russian Civil War for the Bolsheviks.

In the years following the war, Plaskov attended an advanced artillery school, graduating in 1925, as well as attending the Frunze Military Academy in Moscow, graduating in 1932, and the Military Academy of Chemical Protection, graduating in 1938.

== World War II ==
Plaskov saw action during World War Two, beginning in July 1941, when he assisted Ivan Flyorov by firing one of the first Katyushas at the Wehrmacht in Orsha. Roughly a month later, Plaskov would attempt to defend Zhlobin alongside Leonid Petrovsky.

Plaskov then helped to defend Moscow from the German Forces and participated in the counter-offensive that repelled them from the city. In the winter of 1942, Plaskov was promoted to Major General of Artillery of the 10th Army under Lieutenant General Filipp Golikov. During his time in the army, Plaskov would frequently be reprimanded by the Soviet High Command for "indiscreet actions," but would remain a Major General of Artillery for the remainder of the war. During the Battle of Berlin, Plaskov proudly exclaimed to Lieutenant General Semyon Krivoshein:

Look, Sema, just look! Jew Grigory Plaskov beats Hitler, beats this bitch right on the head! Beat, beat him, lads! Beat for Babi Yar, for the torment of our people! Fire, more fire, more fire! Indeed, a symbolic episode...

== Postwar ==
Following the war's conclusion, Plaskov was promoted to Lieutenant General of Artillery and nominated for Hero of the Soviet Union but ultimately never received the latter. Plaskov would later say that he never considered anti-Semitism to be a factor in this event. Plaskov did, however, receive the Order of the Red Banner four times, the Order of Lenin two times, the Order of Kutuzov, the Order of Bogdan Khmelnitsky, the Medal for the Defense of Moscow, the Medal for the Liberation of Warsaw, the Medal for the Capture of Berlin, and the Medal for Victory Over Germany in the Great Patriotic War of 1941–1945. Regarding Plaskov's service in the Soviet military, Marshal Zhukov said, "I don't know of any soldier more valiant than General Plaskov."

In the early 1950s, Plaskov was the Deputy Military Commander of the Taurida Military District, but this changed during "the anti-Semitic year of 1952", when widespread anti-Semitism led to Plaskov's demotion and subsequent appointment as the Head of the Military Department of the State University of Non-Ferrous Metals and Gold. Shortly afterward, in 1956, Plaskov would retire.

Plaskov wrote his memoir, Under the Roar of the Cannonade, in 1969. That same year, the village council of Cosăuți in Moldova awarded Plaskov the title of "Honorary Citizen of Kosouts." Plaskov died three years later in Moscow and was buried in Vvedenskoye Cemetery.

== Legacy ==
In 2010, a memorial was erected in Sheremetevsky that commemorated Plaskov and eighty-one other former residents of the officer's village that contributed to the Soviet war effort in the Second World War. Among the other officers who were commemorated are Vasily Glazunov and Yuri Rykachev.

== Bibliography ==
- Sverdlov, F.D., Ruvik Danieli, and Yishai Cordova. Jewish Generals in the Armed Forces of the Soviet Union. Latrun: Yad Lashiryon, 2005.
- Kazakov, V.I. At the Break. Military Publishing, 1962.
- Schulman, Elias. ‘Sovietish Heimland’: Lone Voices, Stifled Creators. Judaism 14, no. 1 (1965).
- Gitelman, Zvi. Soviet Reactions to the Holocaust, 1945–1991. Essay. In The Holocaust in the Soviet Union, 1st Edition. Routledge, 1993.
- Colton, Timothy J.. Commissars, Commanders, and Civilian Authority: The Structure of Soviet Military Politics. Cambridge, MA and London, England: Harvard University Press, 1979.
- Pashkov, G.P., et al. Belaruskaâ èncyklapedyâ. Polycrates – Prometheus ed., vol. 11, BelEn, 2001.
