= Grigore =

Grigore, the equivalent of Gregory, is a Romanian-language first name. It may refer to:

- Grigore Alexandrescu (1810–1885), Romanian poet and translator
- Grigore Antipa (1866–1944), Romanian Darwinist biologist, ichthyologist, ecologist, oceanologist
- Grigore Băjenaru (1907–1986), Romanian writer
- Grigore Bălan (1896–1944), Romanian Brigadier General during World War II
- Grigore Vasiliu Birlic (1905–1970), Romanian actor
- Grigore Brișcu (1884–1965), Romanian engineer and inventor
- Grigore Cobălcescu (1831–1892), founder of Romanian geology and paleontology
- Grigore Constantinescu (1875–1932), priest and journalist from Romania
- Grigore Cugler (1903–1972), Romanian avant-garde short story writer, poet, and humorist
- Grigore Eremei (b. 1935), Moldovan politician, final First secretary of the Communist Party of Moldavia
- Grigore Gafencu (1892–1957), Romanian politician, diplomat and journalist
- Grigore Alexandru Ghica (1803 or 1807–1857), Prince of Moldavia
- Grigore Leșe (b. 1954), Romanian musician
- Grigore Moisil (1906–1973), Romanian mathematician and computer pioneer
- Grigore Niculescu-Buzești (1908–1949), Romanian politician
- Grigore T. Popa (1892–1948), Romanian physician and public intellectual
- Grigore Răceanu (1906–1996), Romanian communist politician
- Grigore Simionescu (1857–1932), Romanian general
- Grigore Tocilescu (1850–1909), Romanian historian, archaeologist, epigrapher and folklorist
- Grigore Turcuman (1890–1942), Bessarabian Romanian politician
- Grigore Ureche (1590–1647), Moldavian chronicler
- Grigore Vieru (1935–2009), Moldovan poet and writer
