= Georgetown Review =

American literary magazine

Georgetown Review was an annual literary magazine produced at Georgetown College in Georgetown, Kentucky.

== History and profile ==
Georgetown Review was first published in 1993 and hosted a prestigious annual prose contest. The magazine was published annually. It had the largest circulation of any literary magazine published in Kentucky.

Past contributors included Doug Ramspeck, Sam Witt, Frederick Barthelme, Fred Chappell, Denise Duhamel, David Allan Evans, Jacob M. Appel, Mark Halperin, X.J. Kennedy, David Romtvedt, Carla Panciera, Ernest Hilbert, Maraget Hoehn, Gregory Loselle, Shannon Sweetnam, Paula Younger and Emma Bolden.

The magazine's website announced in an undated notice that the Spring 2015 issue will be the last for the journal, although the related press would continue to publish and conduct contests.

== Masthead ==
As of March 2009:

- Editor: Steven Carter
- Poetry Editors: Emma Bolden, Stacy Cartledge
- Assistant Editor: Jacob Price
- Art Director: W.T. Pfefferle

== See also ==
- List of literary magazines
