= Hryhorchuk =

Hryhorchuk is a Ukrainian surname derived from the given name "Hryhor", or Gregory. A variant Ryhorchuk is derived from the simplified variant "Ryhor" of the given name "Hryhor".

- The Russified form is Grigorchuk.
- Belarusian forms: Hryharchuk (from Ukrainian), Grygarchuk (via Russian), or Ryharchuk (native or from "Ryhorchuk").
- Polonized form: Gregorczuk.
- Lithuanized: Grigorčukas (via Russian), Gregorčukas (via Polish)

Notable people with the surname include:

- Lidiia Hryhorchuk
- Roman Hryhorchuk
- Rostislav Grigorchuk

== See also ==
- Grigorchuk group
