= Gregg (given name) =

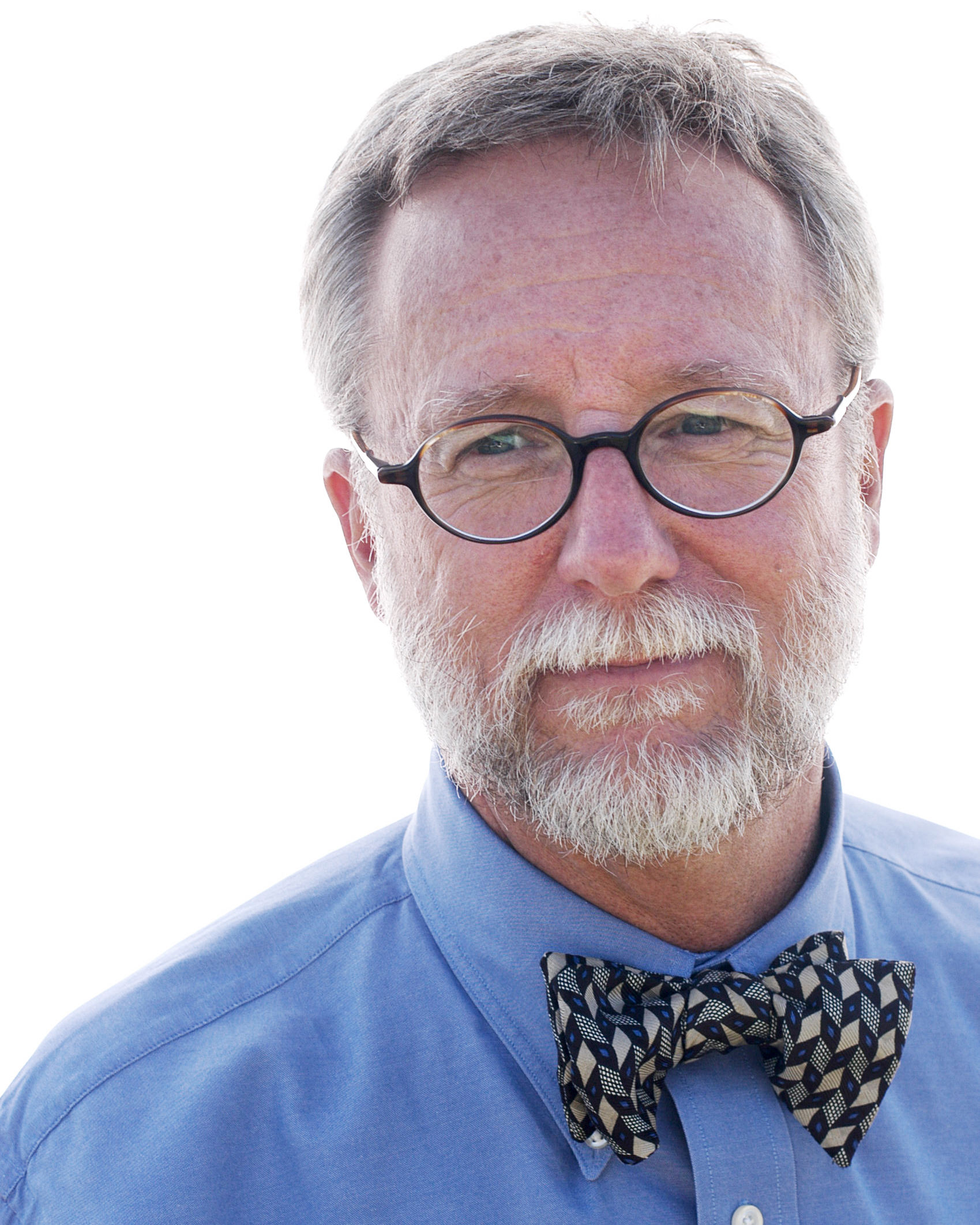
Author Gregg Herken, circa 2004

Gregg is a masculine given name, sometimes a short form (hypocorism) of Gregory. It may refer to:

- Gregg Alexander, American singer/songwriter and producer born Gregory Aiuto in 1970
- Gregg Allman (1947–2017), American singer-songwriter, musician, co-founder of The Allman Brothers Band
- Gregg Amore (born 1966), American politician
- Gregg Araki (born 1959), American film director
- Gregg Bush, American politician
- Gregg Butler (born 1952), American football player
- Gregg Carr (born 1962), American former National Football League player
- Gregg Cunningham (born 1949), American politician
- Gregg Dechert (born 1952), Canadian former keyboardist of Uriah Heep
- Gregg Doyel, American sports writer
- Gregg Edelman (born 1958), American movie, television and theater actor
- Gregg Hale (producer), best known for The Blair Witch Project
- Gregg Hale (musician) (born 1977), best known as the guitarist for the British band Spiritualized
- Gregg Harper (born 1956), American politician
- Gregg Henry, American actor
- Gregg Hoffman (1963–2005), American film producer
- Gregg Hough, American politician
- Gregg Hughes (born 1963), American talk radio broadcaster better known as Opie on The Opie and Anthony Show
- Gregg Jakobson (born 1939), American songwriting partner of Dennis Wilson of The Beach Boys, witness in the murder trials of members of the Manson Family
- Gregg Landaker (born 1951), American re-recording mixer, three-time Academy Award winner
- Gregg Olsen (born 1959), American writer
- Gregg Olson (born 1966), American former Major League Baseball relief pitcher
- Gregg Phillips, former head of the Mississippi Department of Human Services
- Gregg Popovich (born 1949), American National Basketball Association head coach
- Gregg Rolie (born 1947), American singer, keyboardist and organist, lead singer and co-founder of the bands Santana, Journey and Abraxas Pool, member of the Rock and Roll Hall of Fame
- Gregg Rudloff (1955–2019), American re-recording mixer, three-time Academy Award winner
- Gregg Sulkin (born 1992), British actor
- Gregg Takayama (born 1952), American politician
- Gregg Trahey, American biomedical engineer
- Gregg Wallace (born 1964), English television presenter
- Gregg Wattenberg, American songwriter, music producer and musician
- Gregg Zuckerman (born 1949), American mathematician

== See also ==
- R. Gregg Cherry (1891–1957), Governor of North Carolina
- Greg, another masculine given name
