= Gregory Greiten =

American priest

Gregory Greiten (born c. 1964/1965) is an American Catholic priest from Milwaukee, Wisconsin. He gained attention in the United States in 2017 when he came out as a gay man during a homily at Mass.
