= Grzegorz Sztolcman =

Polish politician and physician

Deputy of the Sejm
- In office 2007 – 2015
- Constituency: 28 Częstochowa

Personal details
- Born: Grzegorz Czesław Sztolcman; 23 May 1962 (age 63) Częstochowa, Polish People's Republic
- Party: Civic Platform

Grzegorz Czesław Sztolcman (born 23 May 1962 in Częstochowa) is a Polish politician, physician, and former Sejm member for the Civic Platform (Platforma Obywatelska) during the VI and VII terms.
