= Gregory Pinas =

Dutch basketball player

Personal information
- Born: April 17, 1984 (age 42)
- Listed height: 1.96 m (6 ft 5 in)

Career information
- Playing career: 2002–2004
- Position: Small forward

Career history
- 2002–2004: BSW

Gregory Pinas (born April 17, 1984) is a former Dutch basketball player who played one season in the Dutch Basketball League for BSW during the 2003–04 season.
