= Gregoor =

Gregoor is both a given name and a surname. Notable people with the name include:

- Gillis Smak Gregoor (1770–1843), Dutch landscape painter
- Gregoor van Dijk (born 1981), Dutch footballer
- Jan Gregoor (1914–1982), Dutch painter and art educator
