= Gregory T. Haugan =

American business writer (born 1931)

Gregory T. Haugan (born 1931) is an American author and expert in the field of work breakdown structure.

== Background ==
Haugan received his PhD from American University, his MBA from St. Louis University, and his BSME from the Illinois Institute of Technology.

== Career ==
Haugan specializes in the development and implementation of project management information systems and in training courses relating to development project management. Haugan is associated with the development of the Work Breakdown Structure (WBS) design principle called the 100% Rule. Haugan is vice president of GLH, Incorporated, a management consulting firm for project management, information systems, management consulting, and training support. Haugan has had several books published and has been working as a consultant to the General Services Administration of the US Government since 2004.

== Selected works ==
- Effective Work Breakdown Structures (Management Concepts. Vienna, VA. 2002)
- Project Planning and Scheduling (Management Concepts. Vienna, VA. 2002)
- The Work Breakdown Structure in Government Contracting (Management Concepts. Vienna, VA. 2003)
- Project Management Fundamentals (Management Concepts. Vienna, VA. 2006)
- Work Breakdown Structures for Projects, Programs, and Enterprises Management Concepts (Management Concepts. Vienna, VA. 2008)
