= Gregory Cusack =

American politician

Member of the Iowa House of Representatives from the 81st district
- In office January 8, 1973 – October 1, 1981
- Preceded by: William H. Harbor
- Succeeded by: Thomas H. Fey

Personal details
- Born: May 6, 1943 (age 83) Davenport, Iowa
- Party: Democratic

Gregory Cusack (born May 6, 1943) is an American politician who served in the Iowa House of Representatives from the 81st district from 1973 to 1981.
