= Gregory S. Chirikjian =

American roboticist and scientist (born 1966)

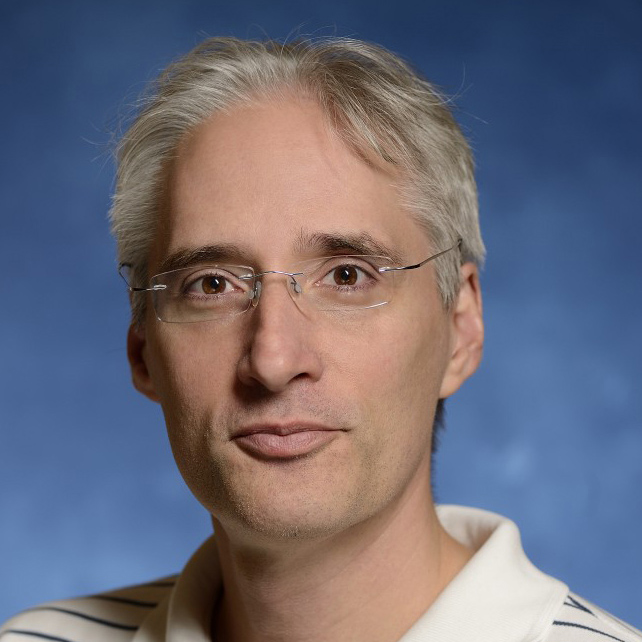
- Born: 1966 (age 59–60)
- Education: Johns Hopkins University (B.S., M.S.); California Institute of Technology (Ph.D.)
- Known for: Robotics, Kinematics, Artificial Intelligence, and Applied Mathematics
- Awards: IEEE Fellow; ASME Fellow
- Scientific career
- Workplaces: Mohamed bin Zayed University of Artificial Intelligence (2026–present)
- Thesis: Theory and Applications of Hyper-Redundant Robotic Manipulators (1992)
- Doctoral advisor: Joel W. Burdick
- Website: chirikjianlab.github.io

Gregory Scott Chirikjian (born 1966) is an American roboticist and applied mathematician, primarily working in the field of kinematics, motion planning, computer vision, group theory applications in engineering, and the mechanics of macromolecules. A longtime professor of Mechanical Engineering at Johns Hopkins University, he recently served as the chair and professor at the Department of Mechanical Engineering at the University of Delaware, and is now a professor in the Robotics Department at Mohamed bin Zayed University of Artificial Intelligence in Abu Dhabi. He is known for his theoretical contributions to the kinematics of hyper-redundant (snake-like and continuum) robots and stochastic methods on Lie groups.

== Academic life ==
Chirikjian received a bachelor's degree from Johns Hopkins University (JHU), Baltimore, MD, USA, in 1988, and the Ph.D. degree from the California Institute of Technology, Pasadena, CA, USA, in 1992. In the same year, he joined the Department of Mechanical Engineering at Johns Hopkins University as an assistant professor. He was promoted to associate professor and full professor in 1997 and 2001, respectively. From 2004 to 2007, he was the Chair of the Department of Mechanical Engineering, Johns Hopkins University. From 2014 to 2015, he served as a program director for the US National Robotics Initiative, which included responsibilities in the Robust Intelligence cluster in the Information and Intelligent Systems Division of CISE at the National Science Foundation (NSF). From 2019 to 2023, he was the Chair of the Department of Mechanical Engineering, National University of Singapore. Unitl recently he was the chair of the Department of Mechanical Engineering at University of Delaware. and is now a professor in the Robotics Department at Mohamed bin Zayed University of Artificial Intelligence in Abu Dhabi.

== Selected Research Accomplishments ==
Chirikjian's PhD work established the concept of `hyper-redundant' (snakelike and continuum) robots and developed framed `backbone curve' models to represent such robots both in terms of their geometrical and inertial properties. These models essentially form the basis for all studies in continuum robots today.

In the 1990s he pioneered `metamorphic' (modular self-reconfigurable) robotic systems, in an attempt to make liquid-like robots that can morph into various shapes, as in a well-known SciFy movie from 1991 that inspired his work on this topic.

In the 2000s Chirikjian worked on robotic self-replication and self-repair. He also applied earlier work on hyper-redundant robotic manipulators to model DNA statistical mechanics, as well as developing computer models of how protein molecules change shape as part of their function.

In the 2010s, he initiated the use of Lie-theoretic methods (e.g., the closed-form `banana distribution') to model uncertainty propagation in robotics, which has become the cornerstone of invariant Kalman filtering. He observed that essentially the same mathematical model that describes DNA statistical mechanics can be used to model the uncertainty in a vehicle's position and orientation, by replacing the framed DNA backbone curve with the time-parameterized trajectory traversed by the vehicle. Starting at this time he also began work on closed-form mathematical expressions for the boundaries of Minkowski sums of ellipsoids, and then generalized that result to Minkowski sums of any bodies with smooth positively curved boundaries.

In the 2020s, he has moved into the area of physical AI, affordance-based reasoning, and `Robot Imagination' while continuing to make contributions to earlier topics. During the COVID lockdown in Singapore, he and his team made rapid progress on this, as well as on completing the Minkowski sum work. Recently, his research group has integrated this into robot motion planning, collision avoidance, and computer vision algorithms that support the concept of `Robot Imagination'.

== Awards and honors ==
Chirikjian was named NSF's Young Investigator in 1993, Presidential Faculty Fellow in 1994, and was a recipient of the ASME Pi Tau Sigma Gold Medal in 1996. He was elected as a fellow of ASME in 2008, and a fellow of IEEE in 2010 for his contributions to hyper-redundant manipulators. In 2019, he received the American Society of Mechanical Engineers' Machine Design Award.
