= Gregory Loewen =

Canadian philosopher

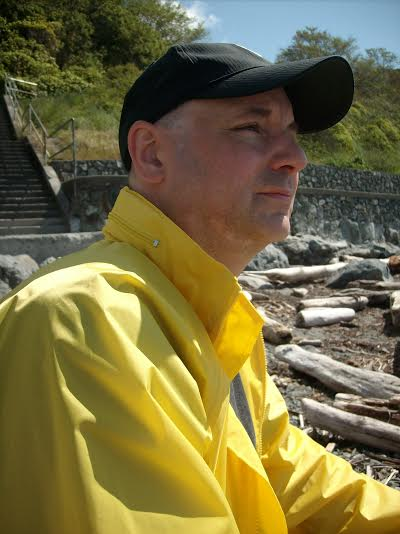
- Loewen in 2013
- Born: January 31, 1966; Victoria, BC, Canada
- Died: May 2, 2026 (age 60); Winnipeg, MB, Canada

Philosophical work
- Notable ideas: Autotopology; artism; the autist; antigonality; phenomemnemonics; the outer child; indefinitude; deontic facticity; detrimental health

Gregory Victor Loewen (January 31, 1966 - May 2, 2026) was a Canadian social philosopher in the traditions of hermeneutics and phenomenology.

== Biography ==
Born in Victoria, BC, Loewen was educated at the University of Victoria with a BA and MA in anthropology and at the University of British Columbia, receiving the PhD in anthropology in 1997. He held two tenure stream positions in the United States before taking up his academic position in Saskatoon, Canada, in 2005, where he was chair of the sociology department for five years and from which he retired in 2018.

== Ideas ==
Loewen's work fits in the traditions of hermeneutics and phenomenology, in which it is assumed that all human perception is subject to variable comprehension and the coming to a shared understanding of texts, worldviews, and even natural objects and forces is an exercise in the arts and uses of language.

In Hermeneutic Pedagogy, Loewen "aims to expound the educational process in the hermeneutical tradition, but is also an essay on the educational model the author calls the hermeneutical circle of experiential pedagogy. Loewen elaborates a conception of learning which considers the dynamic relations between the conservative, the technical and the moral dimensions of education." The book defines the relationships amongst hexis, or custom, praxis, or applied theory, and phronesis, the Aristotelian understanding of practical wisdom, which Loewen considers to be the aim of learning. According to Loewen, "Customs are reinterpreted, theory adjusted to suit reality, [and] the social reality of tradition is reshaped" as people learn. Loewen believes that praxis, applied theory, has the goal of expanding knowledge. According to Loewen, phronesis, the collective experiences that a person learns from, amplifies the effects of hexis and praxis by putting them into question.

In What is God? Loewen asserts that a combination of human aspiration and anxiety regarding mortality that provides an inclination for religion and that the cultural necessity for religion is grounded in the need for human community. In On the Afterlife, Loewen suggests that all known societies are categorized by one of five patterns, either thinking that the soul returns unevaluated to the world, it returns evaluated, it is evaluated and does not return, or it remains unevaluated and does not return. Loewen argues that the concept of "nothingness" does not hamper ethical efforts to imagine that mortality comes to an abrupt and final halt. His notion of 'phenomemnemonics', the study of objects by which we use to remember other experiences, also links biography and religious traditions.

== Bibliography ==
The following is a list of non-fiction and scholarly monographs by Loewen. Loewen has published additional works.

- Basic Problems in Hermeneutics: text, image, music, world (2026) ISBN 978-1-63410-400-5
- Insightful's Guide to Critical Thinking (2026) ISBN 978-1-63410-382-4
- Contrapaganda: essays in a thinking resistance (2026) ISBN 978-1-63410-379-4
- A Field Guide to Common Ghosts (2025) ISBN 978-1-03834-421-2
- A Social Marginalia: studies from the cultural hinterlands (2025) ISBN 978-1-63410-281-0
- What if Questioned I: essays on self-understanding (2024) ISBN 978-1-63410-193-6
- The Work of Warning: and other essays on the question of critique (2024) ISBN 978-1-68235-989-1
- Investigations, Insights, Indictments: Critical Essays (2023) ISBN 978-1-68235-940-2
- The Misplaced Love of the Dead: and other essays in transformative ethics (2023) ISBN 978-1-68235-862-7
- A Pedagogy for the Suppressed (2023) ISBN 978-1-68235-848-1
- The Scandal of Thought: impolitical commentaries (2023) ISBN 978-1-68235-759-0
- Reimagining the Future: a phenomenology of cross-temporal presence, volume three (2022) ISBN 978-1-68235-734-7
- Represencing the Present: a phenomenology of cross-temporal presence, volume two (2022) ISBN 978-1-68235-660-9
- Reintroducing the Past: a phenomenology of cross-temporal presence, volume one (2022) ISBN 978-1-68235-662-3
- On Time: appointments, schedules, calendars, deadlines (2021) ISBN 978-1-68235-532-9
- Words are also Deeds: essays in public ethics and private aesthetics (2021) ISBN 978-1-68235-484-1
- On Being Ignored: and other necessities of the examined life (2020) ISBN 978-1-68235-259-5
- The Penumbra of Personhood: 'Anti-Humanism' Reconsidered (2020) ISBN 978-1-68235-245-8
- Blind Spots: The Altered Perceptions of Anxiety, Remorse and Nostalgia (2019) ISBN 978-1-950860-05-0
- Sacred Science: Ritual and Miracle in Modern Medicine (2017), ISBN 978-1-4331-4328-1
- The Bungle Book: Some Errors by Which We Live (2016), ISBN 978-0-7618-6642-8
- Place Meant: Hermeneutic Landscapes of the Spatial Self (2015), ISBN 978-0-7618-6492-9
- The Big Secrets: ten things every young person needs to know about and why (2014), ISBN 978-1-63135-234-8
- We Other Nazis - how you and I are still like them (2013), ISBN 978-0-9856479-9-5
- The Reason of Unreason (and the Risus Sardonicus of Rationality (2013), ISBN 978-0-9856479-8-8
- Hermeneutic Pedagogy: teaching and learning as dialogue and interpretation (2012), ISBN 978-0-9856479-6-4
- Our Memory of Things: a phenomemnemonics of the object (2012), ISBN 978-0-9856479-0-2.
- On the Use of Art in the Construction of Personal Identity: toward a phenomenology of aesthetic self-consciousness (2012), ISBN 07734-3929-3, ISBN 978-07734-3929-0
- On the Afterlife: you will get there from here (2012), ISBN 978-1-61897-114-2
- Aesthetic Subjectivity: glimpsing the shared soul (2011), ISBN 978-0-9828997-8-6
- The Sociological Vision: an interpretive introduction (2011), ISBN 978-0-9828997-6-2
- Fetish, Cult and Disenchantment: sociological studies of the projected self (2011), ISBN 978-0-98289-972-4
- Three Apodeictic Dialogues: Examples of Conceptual Mirrors in Religion, Psychology and Social Organization (2010), ISBN 0761854118, ISBN 978-0761854111
- Becoming A Modest Society: On Distinguishing Ourselves (2009), ISBN 978-1-60860-633-7
- Social Science Interpretations of Religion: Comparing the Hermeneutic Methodologies of James, Weber, Heidegger and Durkheim (2009)ISBN 978-0-7734-4782-0
- What is God? Musings on Human Anxieties and Aspirations (2008), ISBN 978-1-60693-022-9
- How can we Explain the Persistence of Irrational Beliefs? Studies in social anthropology (2006), ISBN 0-7734-5508-6
- Adventures in the Aporetic: Anthropological Alterities (2005), ISBN 0-7618-3105-3
- A Socio-Ethnography of the Academic Professionalization of Anthropologists (2004), ISBN 0-7734-62384
- Hermeneutical Apprenticeships: Essays. Epigrams, Verse (2003), ISBN 0-7618-2662-9
