= Gregory Gregoriadis =

Greek biochemist and academic (1934–2026)

- Γρηγόρης Γρηγοριάδης
- Born: 27 February 1934; Athens, Greece
- Died: 16 January 2026 (aged 91)
- Education: University of Athens, McGill University
- Known for: Liposomes, Lipid Nanoparticles, mRNA Vaccine Technology
- Spouse: Susan Byron-Brown (m. 1968)
- Children: 2
- Scientific career
- Fields: Biochemistry, Drug Delivery, Vaccine Development
- Workplaces: Medical Research Council, University of London, Xenetic Biosciences

Gregory Gregoriadis (Greek: Γρηγόρης Γρηγοριάδης; 27 February 1934 – 16 January 2026) was a Greek-born British biochemist who pioneered the use of liposomes in drug targeting and vaccine development. His work laid the foundation for many advances in drug delivery systems, including the mRNA vaccines used in battling COVID-19.

== Early life and education ==
Gregory Gregoriadis was born in Athens, Greece, on 27 February 1934, to Christos Gregoriadis and Athina (née Sakellariou). He lived through the harsh years of the Nazi occupation of Greece (1941–1944), an experience he later reflected on in his 2014 novel Still the Cicadas Sing (Greek: Και τα Τζιτζίκια Ακόμα Τραγουδάνε). After completing his Chemistry Bachelor's degree at the University of Athens, Gregoriadis moved to Canada, where he earned a Master of Science in biochemistry from McGill University in 1966, followed by a PhD in 1968.

== Scientific career ==
Gregoriadis’ pioneering work in drug delivery began in the early 1970s when he moved to Britain as a research fellow at the Royal Free Hospital and became involved in research with liposomes—hollow, microscopic spheres composed of fatty membranes. Liposomes were first discovered by British scientist Alec Bangham in the 1960s and Gregoriadis’ work transformed them to a powerful tool for drug delivery. He collaborated with Brenda Ryman and later Anthony Allison to explore liposomes as carriers for vaccines and drugs, showing that liposomes could significantly enhance immune responses.

In 1971, Gregoriadis published landmark research that demonstrated the potential of liposomes to act as immunological adjuvants, which enhance the body’s immune response. His subsequent work confirmed that liposomes could be used to deliver vaccines more effectively, leading to greater antibody responses. This research laid the groundwork for the development of liposomes and lipid nanoparticles as the gold standard in drug delivery systems.

Throughout his career, Gregoriadis worked with various researchers to refine liposome technology, which was used in a wide range of applications—from treating cancer and diabetes to rare metabolic disorders. His groundbreaking research also led to the use of lipid nanoparticles, which became crucial in the development of messenger RNA (mRNA) vaccines.

=== Liposome technology and impact on vaccine development ===
Gregoriadis’ work proved crucial during the global effort to develop vaccines for COVID-19. mRNA vaccines, such as those developed by Pfizer-BioNTech and Moderna, rely on lipid nanoparticles to protect the fragile mRNA from being destroyed when injected into the body. These lipid nanoparticles, originally derived from liposome technology, also act as adjuvants to enhance the immune response to the virus. Gregoriadis expressed pride in the fact that his early research played a significant role in the development of these life-saving vaccines, noting that his work from decades earlier had directly contributed to the technological advancements seen in the fight against COVID-19.

=== Academic and professional positions ===
Gregoriadis held several prestigious positions throughout his career. He served as a senior scientist with the Medical Research Council from 1972 to 1993 and was a professor and head of the Centre for Drug Delivery Research at University College London’s School of Pharmacy from 1990 to 2001. In 1997, he founded Lipoxen (now Xenetic Biosciences), a biotech company based in Boston, Massachusetts, to commercialize liposome-based technologies. Gregoriadis remained the director of research at Lipoxen until 2015.

== Personal life and death ==
Gregoriadis was interested in the history and philosophy of ancient Athens, politics, and creative writing. In 1968, he married Susan Byron-Brown, with whom he had two children, a son and a daughter. He died on 16 January 2026, at the age of 91.

== See also ==
- mRNA vaccines
- Immunologic adjuvant
