= Grischa =

Male given name

Grischa (alternatively spelled Grisha or Gricha) is a short form for the name Gregory or Grigorij, and sometimes for the name Georgi as well, used in Russia and some other Slavic countries, including Ukraine and Bulgaria. The "sha" ending is a typical short form in the Russian language for names. Other such short forms include Natasha for Natalia, Sasha for Alexander, Alyosha for Alexei, and Misha for Michael (or Mikhail, which is the Russian spelling).

Grisha may refer to

== People ==
=== First name ===
- Grisha Heyliger-Marten (born 1976), Sint Maartener politician
- Grisha Putin (born 2006), Russian nationalist and gaming influencer, often known mononymously as "Grisha"

=== Surname ===
- Gehad Grisha (born 1976), an Egyptian soccer referee

=== Fictional characters ===
- Grisha Yeager, a character in Attack on Titan

== Other ==
- Grisha, a short story by Anton Chekhov
- Grisha-class corvette, a Soviet anti-submarine class of corvettes

== See also ==
- Names in Russian Empire, Soviet Union and CIS countries
- The Case of Sergeant Grischa, the title of a novel by Arnold Zweig
