= Gregory Kotrotsios =

Greek professional basketball player (born 1984)

Gregory Kotrotsios Γρηγόρης Κοτρώτσιος
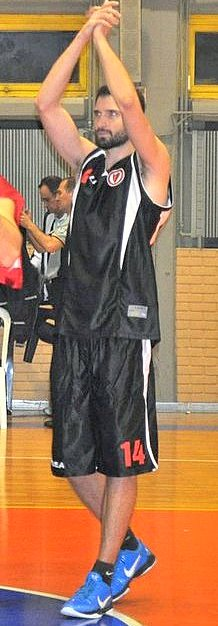
- Gregory Kotrotsios returning the applause.

Personal information
- Born: 6 August 1984 (age 42) Trikala, Greece
- Listed height: 6 ft 10 in (2.08 m)
- Listed weight: 238 lb (108 kg)

Career information
- Playing career: 1999–present
- Position: Power forward-Center
- Number: 14

Career history
- 1999-01: Ikaroi Trikalon
- 2001-02: Ilisiakos B.C.
- 2002-03: Holargos A.O.
- 2003-04: A.G.O. Rethymno Aegean BC
- 2004-05: Kadmos Thiva BC
- 2005-07: Ardittos BC
- 2007-08: Livadeia B.C.
- 2008-09: Deilino Iraklio BC
- 2009-11: AO Pagrati BC

Gregory Kotrotsios (born August 6, 1984) is a Greek professional basketball player who plays for the AO Pagrati BC of the HEBA A2 (Greek basketball league). Standing at 6'10", Kotrotsios plays the power forward position but also has the mobility, size and shooting ability to play the center position.

== Early years ==
Born in Trikala, Greece, Gregory Kotrotsios started playing basketball at the age of 8 and at age 17 signed his first professional contract with Ilysiakos B.C. During his 1st year he made an enormous impression that led to his invitation to the U20 Greece national basketball team making 2 caps in games against the U20 Russia national basketball team. During that year Kotrotsios was not only playing for the first team of Ilysiakos but also for its youth team that finished second in the Greek Youth Basketball League.

After spending some years on loan to gain playing experience, Kotrotsios was transferred to the prestigious A.G.O. Rethymno Aegean BC. He had a very successful year during which he was either the team's Starter or Sixth Man. He was a major contributor to A.G.O.R's promotion to the next higher league with only two defeats.

Following that successful year, Gregory followed up with numerous transfers to smaller league teams where he was a key player. In 2009, he signed with the highly reputed AO Pagrati BC, a legendary team for Greek basketball aficionados, currently playing in the second division of the highest professional basketball competition among pro clubs in Greece HEBA A2. He renewed his contract with AO Pagrati BC for the 2010–2011 season.

== Career stats ==
(Data not available for categories below HEBA A2)

Year	Team	GP	GS	MPG	FG%	3P%	FT%	RPG	APG	SPG	BPG	PPG
2009	AO Pagrati BC	1	7	3.14	.0	.0	.0	.85	.0	.0	.0	.14
2010	AO Pagrati BC	8	22	8.9	.39	.99	.40	1.6	.36	.04	.3	1.2

== Personal links ==
- Gregory Kotrotsios on Facebook.
- Gregory Kotrotsios on Twitter
