= Gregory Brigman =

American Paralympic football player and soccer referee

Personal information
- Nationality: United States
- Born: February 27, 1987 (age 38)

Gregory Brigman (born February 27, 1987) is an American Paralympic football player and soccer referee. He was first called up to the United States National Paralympic Team in March 2016, and traveled with the team for a competition in Salou, Spain in May 2016. He then represented the US at the 2016 Rio Games.

== Personal ==
Brigman was born on February 27, 1987, and is from Harrisburg, North Carolina.

Brigman is a soccer referee for the United States Soccer Federation, refereeing on a state level. He has refereed a number of matches including a 2013 game between Charlotte Eagles and Charleston Battery, a 2016 game between Charlotte Independence and Bethlehem Steel.

== Cerebral palsy football ==
Brigman is a CP7 footballer, who plays in the defense. He tried to crowd fund US$6,000 to compete in Rio but only raised US$2,600.

Brigman took part in a national team training camp in Chula Vista, California in early March 2016. This was his first call up to participate in a national team training camp. He was with the team again at a national team training camp in April 2016 in Florida. Brigman was part of the United States Paralympic National Team that took part in the 2016 Pre Paralympic Tournament in Salou, Spain. The United States finished 6th after beating Argentina in one placement match 4 - 3 and losing to Ireland 4 - 1. The goals scored in the match against Argentina were the first the USA scored in the tournament, before putting up one more in their match against Ireland. The tournament featured 7 of the 8 teams participating in Rio. It was the last major preparation event ahead of the Rio Games for all teams participating.
