= Gregory Kondos =

American painter (1923–2021)

Gregory Kondos (1923-2021) was an American painter known for his landscapes, particularly those of California's Sacramento Valley and coastlines. Kondos’ close friend and frequent collaborator, artist Wayne Thiebaud, called Kondos’s intuitive, unfettered technique “a kind of brush dancing." Throughout his career, Kondos frequently painted Yosemite, serving as artist-in-residence at the national park in 1990. His large-scale paintings, River’s Edge (1988) and Sutter’s Gold (2015) decorate the Sacramento International Airport.

== Contributions ==
With fellow artist and friend, Wayne Thiebaud, Kondos founded the Artists Cooperative Gallery, one of the earliest showcases for aspiring artists in northern California.

== Collections and exhibitions ==
Kondos' works have been exhibited in museums and galleries around the world including the National Academy of Design in New York, the Rives Arches Museum in France, and the Hirshorn Museum in Washington, D.C. The Crocker Art Museum in Sacramento, California, hosted retrospectives of Kondos' career in 2013 and 2021.

== Awards and honors ==
In 2016, Gregory Kondos, along with LeVar Burton, received one of the inaugural stars on Sacramento, California's Walk of Stars. On April 9, 2013, the City of Sacramento, California celebrated Gregory Kondos Day. The California Arts Council recognized Kondos with the prestigious 2007 Golden Bear Artist of the Year Award.

Kondos received an honorary doctorate from his alma mater, California State University, Sacramento. In 1997, a PBS documentary, Gregory Kondos: A Passion for the Land, explored Kondos' contribution to American landscape painting and documented Kondos' working friendship with Wayne Thibaud. Kondos was elected to the National Academy of Design in 1995. The Kondos Gallery at Sacramento City College was named in his honor in 1982.
