= Loretta Gregorini =

Italian astronomer

Loretta Gregorini (born 1948) is an Italian astronomer, active in the fields of radioastronomy and observational cosmology. Minor planet 34004 Gregorini was named after her.
