= Grzegorz Gawlik =

Polish explorer and lawyer

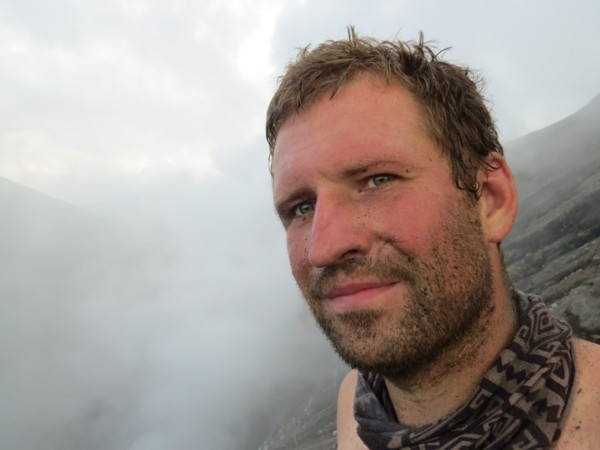
Grzegorz Gawlik - Lokon Tampaluan Volcano, Sulawesi, Indonesia.

Grzegorz Gawlik (born 6 May 1980, died April 2023) was a Polish traveler, mountaineer, volcano explorer, journalist, photographer and lawyer.

== Life and career ==
Gawlik traveled to about 100 countries on six continents. He created the 100 Volcanoes Project in 2006; as of 2016, the project was halfway complete.

Gawlik studied law at the Silesian University in Katowice.

== Disappearance ==
On April 7, 2023, Gawlik disappeared while climbing Mount Ontake in Japan. By April 18, he was presumed dead. On July 7, 2023, a search team found his body on Mount Ontake's southeastern slope.
