= Gregory Loselle =

American poet

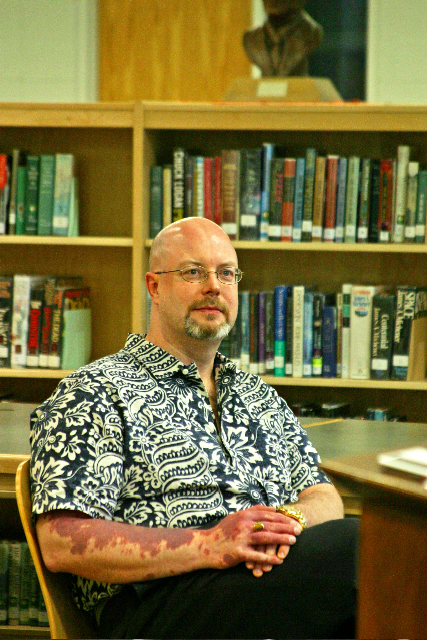
Loselle, Gregory

Gregory Loselle (born 1963) is an American poet, dramatist, teacher, and writer of short fiction.

Winner of the Ruby Lloyd Apsey Award for Playwriting in 1988, for "New York Times," and author of a short play published by The Dramatic Publishing Company in 1981, his fiction has been published in the Georgetown Review and The Saturday Evening Post (his short story, "Lazarus," which won The Lorian Hemingway Short Fiction Competition in 2009), while his poetry has appeared in literary journals such as Alehouse, Oberon, The Comstock Review, Inkwell, Sow's Ear, The Pannus Index, The Pinch and Rattle and has won several competitions and awards, including The Rita Dove Poetry Prize in the Salem College International Writing Awards and the Robert Frost Foundation's Robert Frost Award for Poetry in 2009. He won four Hopwood Awards for Creative Writing, and the Academy of American Poets Prize, at the University of Michigan, where he earned an MFA in Creative Writing.

Loselle is the author of six short collections of poetry, "Phantom Limb" and "Our Parents Dancing," published by Puddinghouse Press (which have since been made available through Google Books), "The Whole of Him Collected" (2012), "About the House" (2013), and "Animal Fare" (2020), published by Finishing Line Press, and "In Ordinary Time," a collection of poems written for song-cycles for composers Jeffrey Nytch and Justin Rito, from Moonstone Press (2020). He is the author of a full-length collection, "The Very Rich Hours," published by The Poetry Box Press in October 2019.

His work has been nominated for the Pulitzer Prize (for his chapbook, "The Whole of Him Collected"), and for the 2019 Best of the Web (his poem 'Lobster in Broth.')

He lives in southeastern Michigan, south of Detroit.
