= Gregory Lomayesva =

American artist from New Mexico, U.S.

- Born: 1971 (age 54–55)
- Citizenship: American
- Parents: William "Bill" Lomayesva (father); Maria Romero Cash (mother)

Gregory Lomayesva (born 1971) is an American painter, sculptor, and mixed-media artist who lives and works in Santa Fe, New Mexico. He draws imagery and ideas from his Hopi and Hispanic heritage and American popular culture.

== Personal life ==
Gregory Lomayesva was born in 1971. His mother, Marie Romero Cash, is Hispanic and a santera, while his father, William "Bill" Lomayesva (Hopi) was a jeweler, painter, and woodcarver. According to Lomayesva, he doesn't identify closely with either culture. but embraces each as a part of his upbringing.

== Contemporary woodwork ==
A painter since his mid-teens, Lomayesva's career began when he combined his woodworking skills with the Hopi imagery into fusion sculptures. Beginning with the masks and dolls that are staples of his historical folk-craft tradition, Lomayesva quickly built a recognizable visual lexicon all his own that he was eventually able to bring to large-scale works of wood, bronze, and steel.

== The paintings ==
Expanding his output to include large-scale painting, Lomayesva began dipping into the contemporary zeitgeist of sampling and appropriation and took his audiences along on a journey to understand the totality of his influences, from Hopi imagery to popular culture icons to the works of the Renaissance masters.

Exploring past painting styles, he appropriated classical images from art history, scanning images from art books then finding a section to explore further in his own work. Using an innovative photo-emulsion process, Lomayesva would capture the projection of the chosen image on canvas, then begin the process of layering meaning into his canvasses by juxtaposing silver-gelatin images with abstract brush strokes, silk-screened pop culture logos, and Hopi iconography from his own visual vocabulary. Lomayesva created hundreds of works on canvas, most of which are in museum or private collections throughout the US and abroad.

== Music and electronics ==
In addition to his fine art paintings, Lomayesva has produced two complete albums of electronic pop music on his label Drip Records, produced several short films, and recently "cloned" an out-of-production music vocal compression circuit board from the 1950s for his own use and for sale as a limited edition functional art piece to electronic music composers. With his developing skills in music, video, film, electronics, and other New Media, Lomayesva produced his first environment at Site Santa Fe.

Lomayesva's body of work includes thousands of canvasses, woodcraft artifacts, and other ephemera. Recent series have drawn inspiration from Op Art and portraiture.

== Selected solo exhibitions ==
- 2008 "Muse" at Gebert Contemporary, Los Angeles
- 2008 "Bounce" at Ursa Gallery, Santa Fe
- 2006 "More Indian" at Winterrowd Fine Art, Santa Fe
- 2006 "The Art of War" at Art & Industry, Santa Fe
- 2005 "You Can Breathe Now" at J. Cacciola gallery, New York
- 2005 "Flutter" Washington DC
- 2005 "Untitled" at Chiaroscuro Gallery, Scottsdale
- 2004 "untitled" at J Cacciola Gallery, New York
- 2004 "16:9" at Peyton Wright Gallery, Santa Fe
- 2003 "Bent" at Peyton Wright Gallery, Santa Fe
- 2003 "Swoon" at Chiaroscuro Gallery, Scottsdale
- 2002 "Curves Ahead" at Peyton Wright Gallery, in Santa Fe
- 2001 "Common bonds" at Peyton Wright Gallery, in Santa Fe
- 2000 STAP project, in Florence, Italy
- 1999 "New Works" at Bryans Gallery, Taos, NM
- 1998 Southwest Museum in Los Angeles
