= Gregory Duralev =

Russian bodybuilder, businessman, economist, author (born 1979)

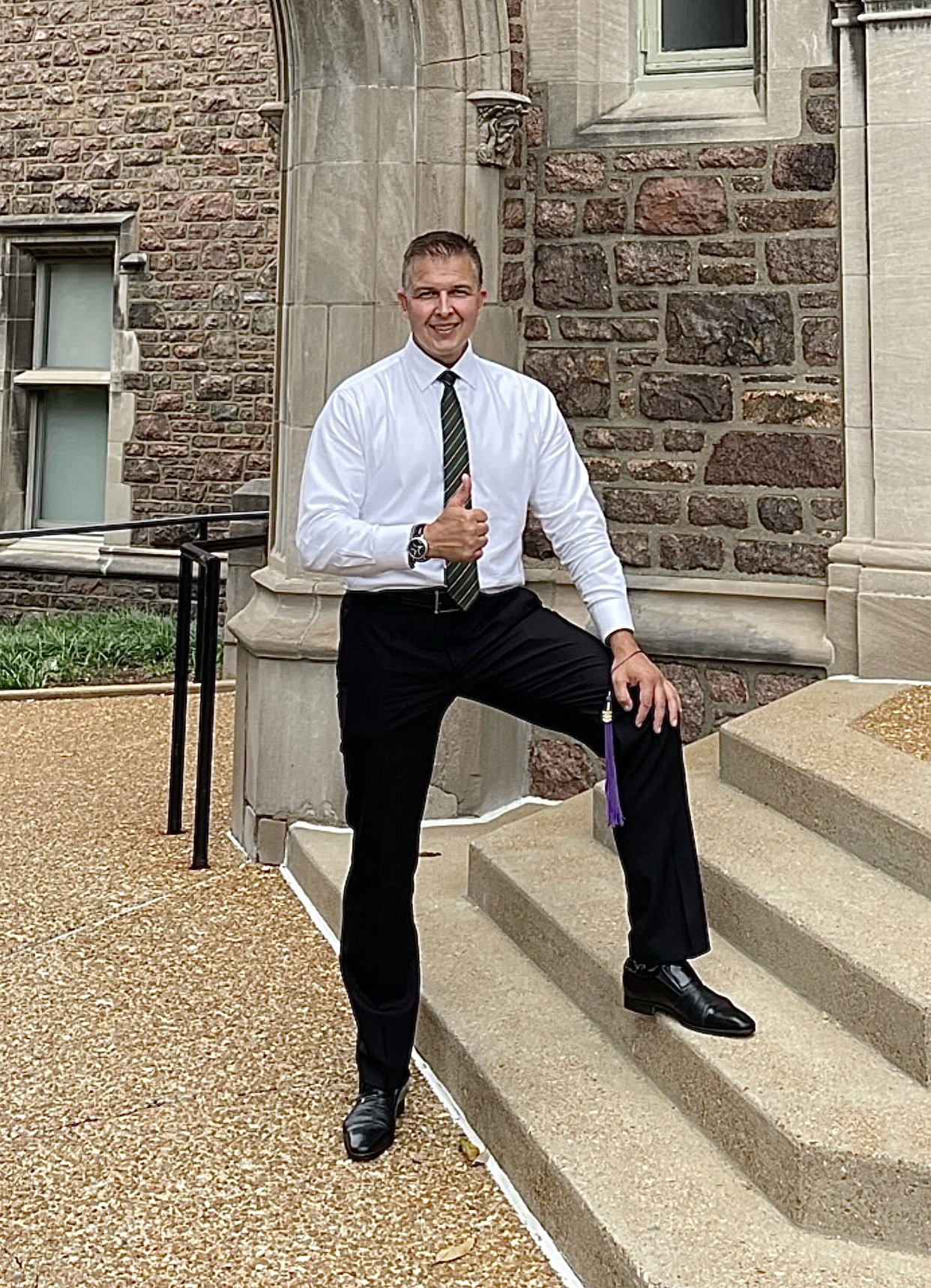
- Gregory Duralev in 2018
- Born: Gregory Urievich Duralev; March 3, 1979 (age 47); Barnaul, Altai Krai, Siberia, Russia
- Education: Altai State Technical University (M.eng.); Russian Presidential Academy of National Economy and Public Administration (M.P.A.); Washington University in St. Louis
- Children: 1
- Website: www.underrednotice.com

Gregory Duralev (born 4 March 1979) is a Russian former bodybuilder, businessman, economist, and author who fled his home country in 2015 after writing his civil initiative on Strategy to develop the Russian economy by supporting medium and small business and comprehensive program to fight against corruption and uploading it directly to the website of the President of Russia V.V. Putin. Subsequently, Duralev being charged with fraud under allegedly fabricated allegations.

Arriving in the United States, he applied for political asylum on January 25, 2016, and was permitted by the U.S. Department of Homeland Security to remain in the United States until his application would be decided. However, in September 2018, while awaiting the decision of his asylum application, he was arrested by the subdivision of the U.S. Department of Homeland Security - Immigration and Customs Enforcement in Los Angeles on the charge of remaining in the United States without permission notwithstanding that the permission allowing Duralev to remain in the United States as an asylum seeker was still valid.

The official narrative signed by the immigration officers revealed that the reason of the conducted arrest was the INTERPOL Red Notice issued for Duralev on Russian request even though such an arrest in specific circumstances was outside of the official power given to the U.S. Department of Homeland Security by the United States legislation. Duralev was sent to the immigration detention that was situated in the maximum security prison - Theo Lacy Facility in Orange, California from where he was relocated several times to the different immigration facilities in California. Until early 2020, when Duralev was released on Immigration bond, he had been detained for approximately 525 days in the United States for administrative violation that he had never committed.

Before an arrest Duralev established a cryptocurrency mining farm specializing on mining Litecoin on professional ASIC devices working on Scrypt algorithm. The farm situated in Reno, Nevada and was ranked as 23–25 in the world among the farms connected to Litecoinpool.org. However, it was destroyed caused by the arrest and detention of Duralev.

After he was released Duralev applied and was admitted to the Washington University School of Law. Duralev is still pursuing his immigration case along with the reinstatement of his right that should have been secured but was violated by the United States having undertaken the important international legal obligation before the United Nations under Refugee Act of 1980 and Protocol Relating to the Status of Refugees of 1967.

In 2022 Freedom House - a non-profit organization based in Washington, D.C., known for political advocacy surrounding issues of democracy, political freedom, and human rights and founded with Wendell Willkie and Eleanor Roosevelt, included Gregory Duralev in its Special Report titled "Unsafe in America: Transnational Repression in the United States" as an example of immigration cases involving Interpol notices from countries known to issue abusive Red Notices.

In April of 2024, Gregory was invited by the legislative staff of the Office of California Assemblymember Jasmeet Bains to get his perspective and advocate before the appropriate committees in support of the proposed state legislation to respond to transnational repression, specifically attempts by foreign governments to harm or threaten California residents who are dissidents or exiles from that country. This bill would make it California policy to prevents acts of transnational repression and support victims when it occurs, and train law enforcement to recognize and respond to these actions.

== Books ==
Under Red Notice is a forthcoming political thriller and memoir by Gregory Duralev, based on his experiences in Russia and the United States and focusing on modern forms of transnational political repression. It is scheduled for release in the first quarter of 2026. Gregory (Grigorii) Duralev has been named a finalist in the True Story Award category at the 2026 British Page Turner Awards for his book Under Red Notice.

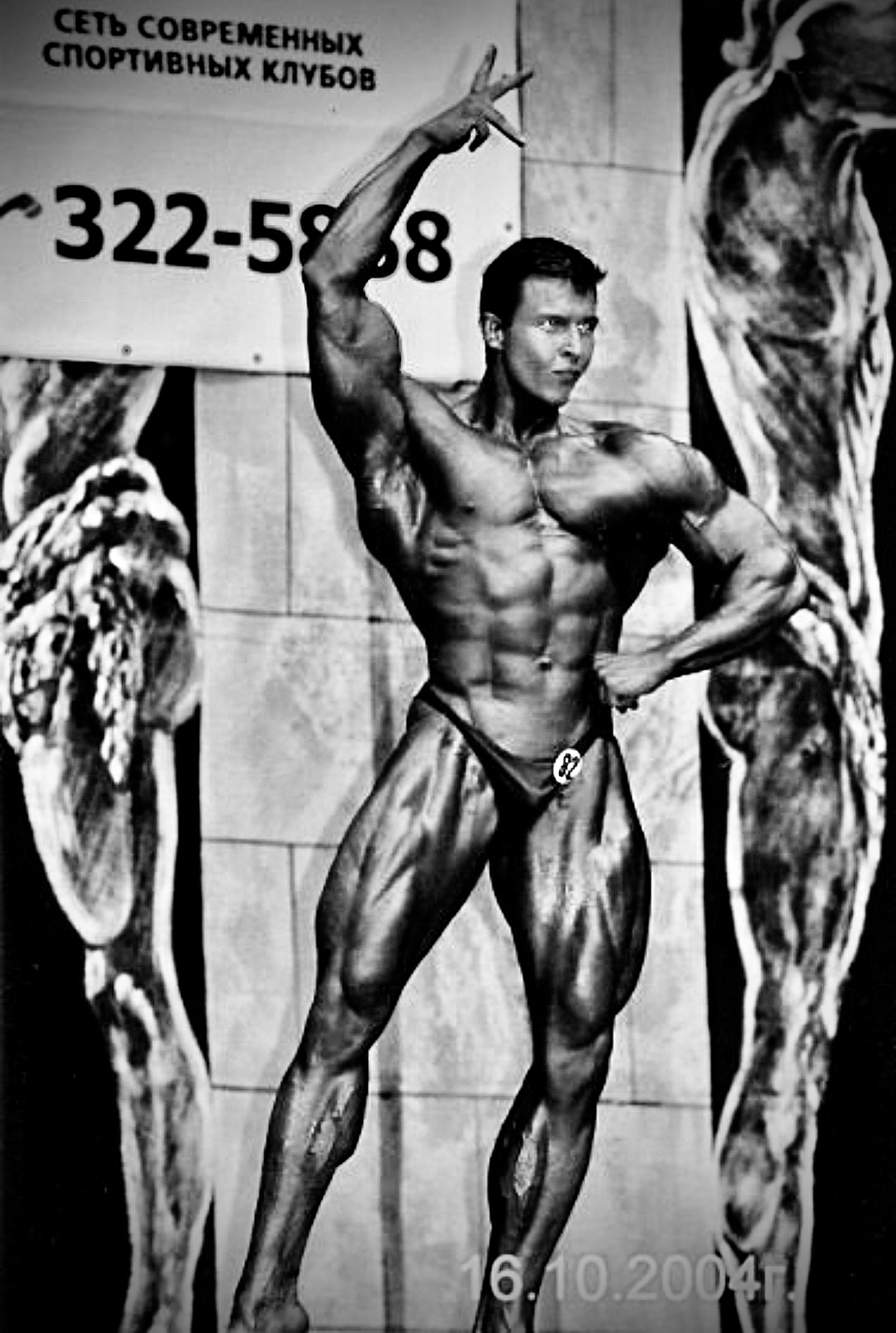
St.Peterburg, Russia at competition 2004

== Early years ==
During Gregory's early years, he was a competing bodybuilder and won several prestigious contests in Russia. Gregory was awarded with the title of Master of Russian Sports at the age of 19. When he won the silver at the Russian Championship in 1999. At the same age he opened his own gym in his home city Barnaul and called it “The Planet of Muscles.” Soon, Gregory's gym became one of the most popular spots in the city to train.
