= Gregory P. Hawkins =

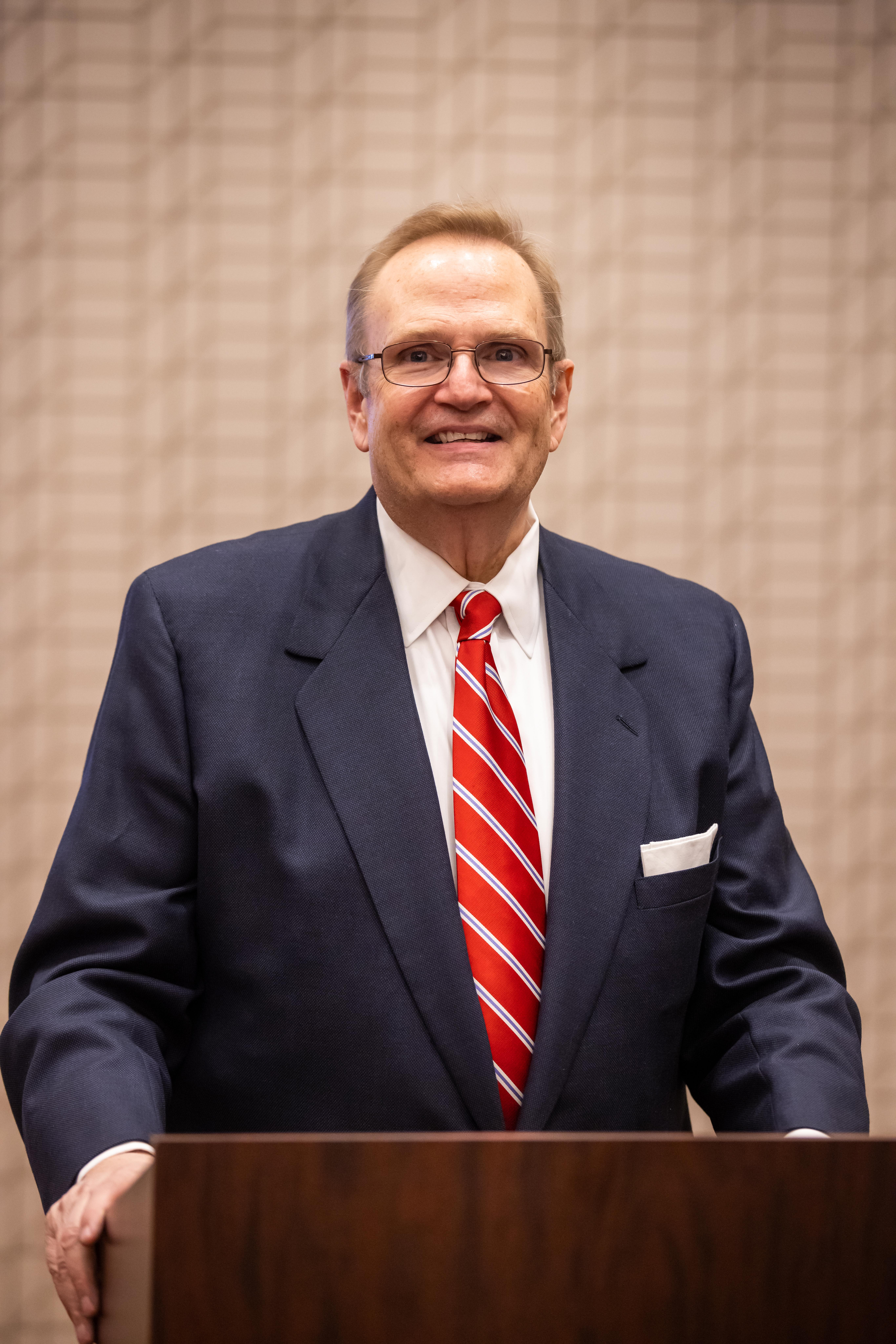

Speaker, writer, lawyer

Personal details
- Born: September 22, 1957 (age 68) Sacramento, CA

Gregory P. Hawkins (born September 22, 1957) is an American speaker, writer, teacher, lawyer and former elected official.

== Personal information ==
Born on September 22, 1957, Hawkins is the son of Joye (née Strange) and Paul Edward Hawkins. Hawkins is a fifth generation Utahn, his great-great-grandmother having arrived in the Salt Lake Valley with one of the first handcart companies. His father served with the U.S. Army occupation force in Germany after World War II and received a commission to the U.S. Air Force upon graduating from the University of Utah. Hawkins lived outside Utah during most of his childhood because his father's military and work assignments took the family to California, Hawaii, Georgia, Florida, and Kentucky.

As a young man, Hawkins worked in a fast food restaurant, hardware store, a landscaping business, and as an electrician's assistant. He started his first business when he was 12 years old setting up a concessions stand at a recreation center in Florida. Hawkins' entrepreneurial spirit continued through his youth: he built and sold surfboards, marketed farm supplies, painted houses, and cleaned carpets.Hawkins graduated from Kentucky's Bardstown High School in 1974. He then served an LDS mission. After his service, Hawkins began his studies at the University of Utah, but transferred to Brigham Young University in 1979. He graduated with his bachelor's degree in Political Science in 1981. After graduation, Hawkins obtained his Juris Doctor from the University of Utah in 1984. Hawkins is married to Arlene Joy Van Der Beek.

== Speaker ==
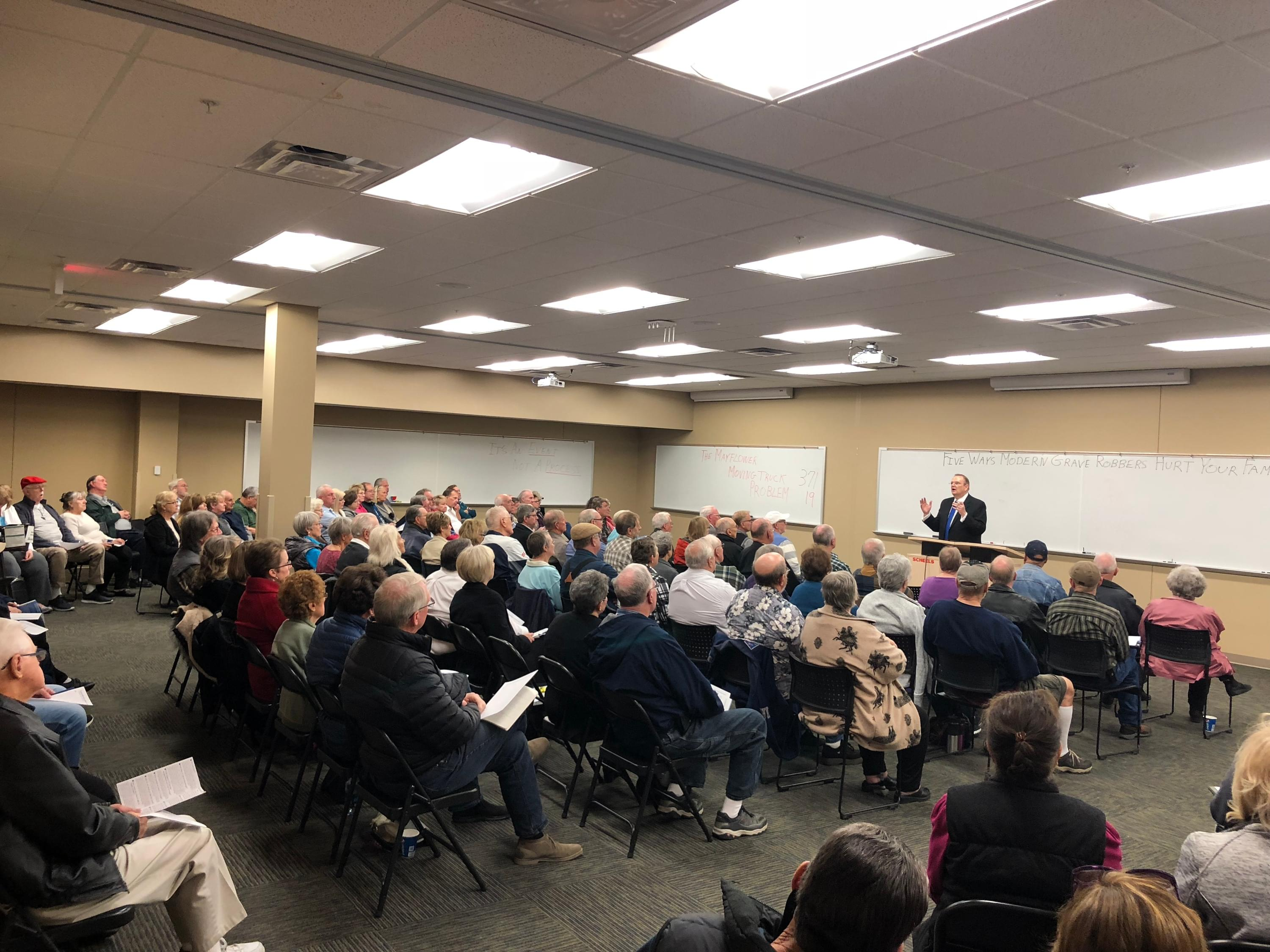

Hawkins has been both a public speaker and a professional speaker since the 1980s. He has spoken in hundreds of settings, thousands of times to tens of thousands of people. Some of his speeches have been reduced to written and CD form. Currently, Hawkins speaks on topics ranging from law to ethics to faith to public policy. Some of these have been organized into keynote, half-day, and full-day seminars; especially designed for professional continuing education and corporate training.

== Writer ==
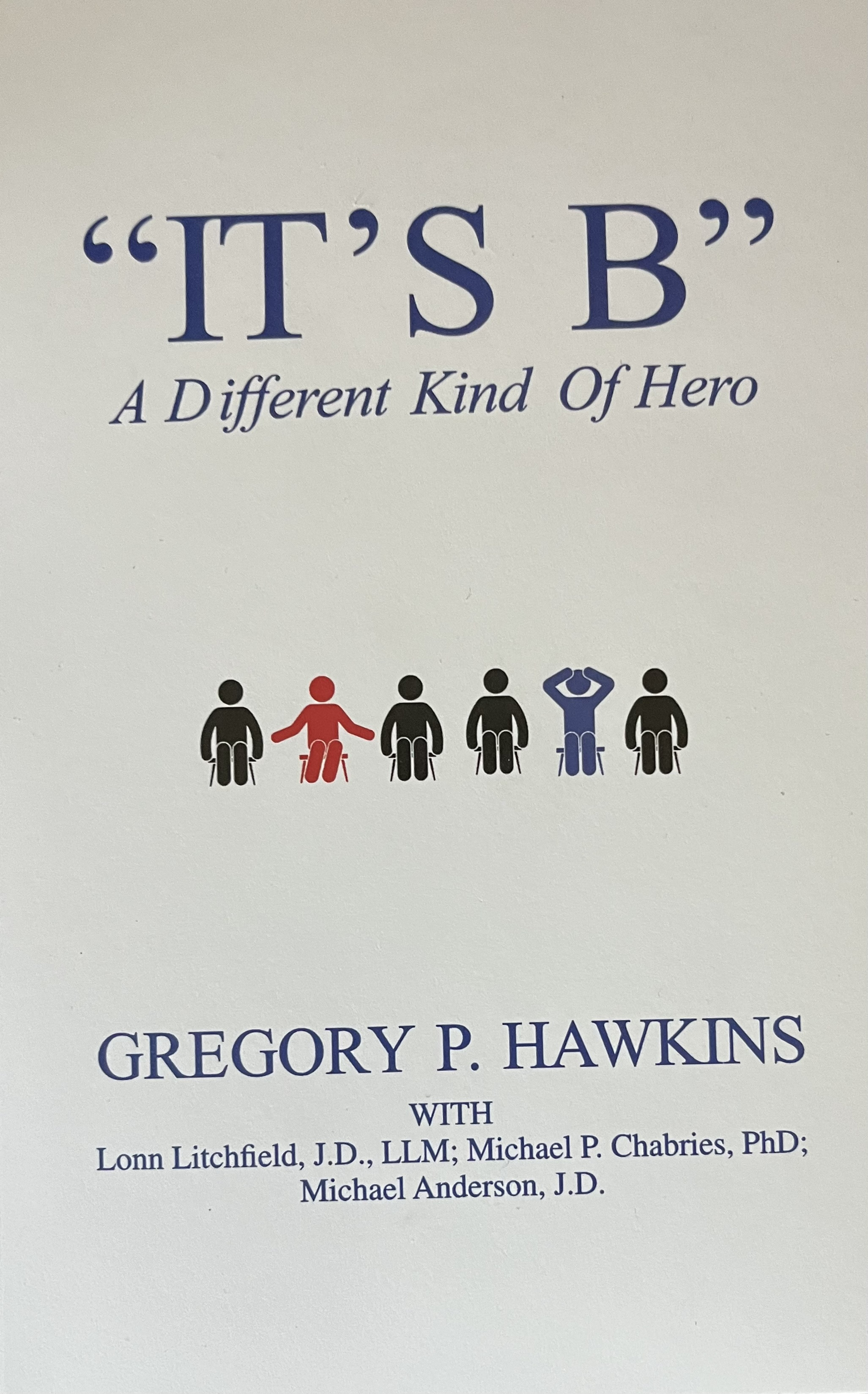

Hawkins has written articles that have been published in over 40 publications on subjects ranging from legal topics to management to American political philosophy to ethics. He published his first book in 2012 – Jesus was Adopted: Triumph of the Human Spirit from the Lives of Celebrated People Who Were Adopted—reworked and republished under the title We Were Adopted. Hawkins's second book was published in early 2014 and co-authored with Lonn Litchfield – Corruption: Fraud, Embezzlement, and Other Bad Acts and the Auditors that Found Them. Hawkins' third book was also published in 2014, titled, Citizenship: An Introduction to Social Ethics Re-examined. His most recent book, It's "B," a Different Kind of Hero. He continues to write articles and work on book projects. The book he cherishes most is, DEAR CHILDREN, Your Father's Assurance of Things Hope for.

== Teacher ==
Hawkins began working for the educational system of the Church of Jesus Christ of Latter Day Saints as a seminary teacher in 1986. His first assignment was at the seminary adjacent to West High School in Salt Lake City. While continuing his work at West High, he began teaching Institute classes at the University of Utah Law School in 1993. Hawkins became the principal of the West High seminary in 1997 until he quit in 1999 in order to run for the U.S. Senate.

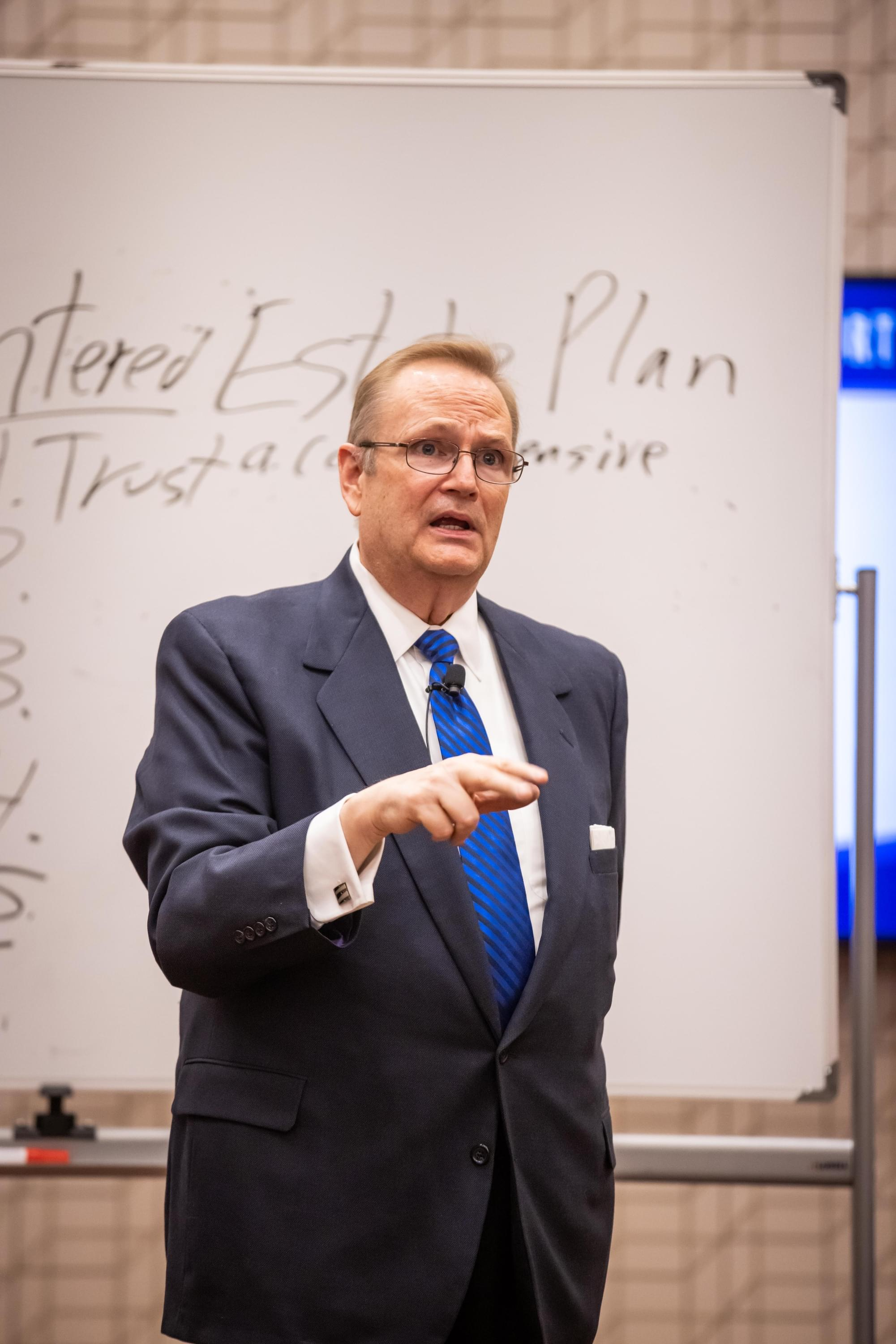

After the campaign in 2000, Hawkins returned to teaching. He began work at the Institute adjacent to Salt Lake Community College campus, where he later became the Director. In 2002, he finished his time in Church Education in order to spend more time on his private law practice and public policy.

== Lawyer ==
Hawkins has practiced law for over 38 years. He has successfully handled cases from complex brain injury to routine soft tissue injury, from medical malpractice to products liability, from trademark infringement to securities fraud, from sexual harassment to federal civil rights, from slip and fall to dog bites, from simple real estate to complex contract disputes, from protection of parental rights to termination of parental rights.

An adoptive father himself, Hawkins has been described "as one of the most experienced and knowledgeable adoption lawyers in the state." He has finalized and litigated hundreds of adoptions.

Today, Hawkins focuses his entire practice on legally preparing clients for death – Trust Centered Estate Planning. His primary focus is to keep clients and their families out of court through proper legal preparation and to achieve their estate planning goals.

== Public office ==
=== U.S. Senate candidate ===
Billed as the "Citizen Candidate," on June 16, 1999, Hawkins announced his candidacy for United States Senate. Within days of his announcement, Hawkins began to travel the state, speaking to small groups. In 2000, Hawkins filed his candidacy for the United States Senate and challenged Sen. Hatch for the Republican nomination.

Although described as "too well funded", Hawkins lacked the political action funds and personal wealth traditionally used to pay for senate campaigns. Instead, Hawkins relied on donations from supporters and his own savings from working as a teacher and attorney. Instead of money, the campaign used direct access to the candidate as its primary weapon. Hawkins crossed the state again and again, meeting in homes, libraries, senior centers and the occasional lecture hall.

Because Hawkins was facing a member of his own party, antagonism proved unavoidable. It increased each week as Hawkins demonstrated that he posed a genuine challenge to the incumbent Senator. Despite the competitive atmosphere, both candidates were respectful and cordial throughout the campaign.

After more than 18 months of campaigning, Hawkins faced Hatch at the Republican Convention. Hawkins's opposition to the incumbent was uncommon: "Although challenged in the past, no one had ever managed to mount a serious re-election challenge to Utah's four-term, senior Senator." After the votes were counted, Hawkins had lost the opportunity for a primary by a narrow margin: 54 of the 3600 ballots cast or roughly 1.5% of the voting body.

After losing, and at the same convention, Hawkins was drafted by gubernatorial candidate Glen Davis to be his primary running mate. Hawkins appeared on the primary ballot statewide as the candidate for Lt. Governor.

=== U.S. House of Representatives candidate ===
In 2004, Hawkins faced Rep. Chris Cannon for the Utah's 3rd Congressional District seat in the House of Representatives. Ultimately, Cannon became the Republican nominee and won the election with 63.4% of the vote.

=== Elected auditor ===
In 2010, Hawkins ran for Salt Lake County Auditor. He defeated the incumbent Jeff Hatch (D) by 1.09% of the vote.

As the Salt Lake County Auditor, Hawkins' office was responsible for uncovering and investigating wrongdoing within county government organizations including cases of misuse and theft of public funds fraud.

== Controversy ==
Prior to Hawkins' taking office, the previously elected auditor produced an average of less than 11 audits per year. Hawkins' office produced more than 180 audits during a three-year period. The average number of violations uncovered per month increased from less than 10 to 54. For the first time in the history of the auditor's office, all 200 county entities were audited in one Auditor's term.

The increased number of audits translated directly into better county government. Hawkins made over 1,100 recommendations to county agencies to help them improve their compliance with county fiscal rules. Agencies implemented nearly all of his recommendations. There have been approximately 35 criminal charges that have come from audits completed under Hawkins' direction.

"These audits are helping us review our internal processes and make improvements," says Darrin Casper, chief financial officer for

the county mayor. "Greg takes a positive view that minimizes people's resistance to change."

His ability to greatly increase performance showed up in the work of the Property Tax Division, as well. Hawkins created a new property tax notice beginning in 2013.

Casper said it "was the easiest to understand tax notice I have seen in years".

JodiAnn Martin, a county employee of 34 years and the director of the auditor's Property Tax Division, agreed and added, "He always finds something else to improve, like streamlining the annual May tax sale." Hawkins has a knack for finding problems in government and fixing them.

"He's relentless", Martin says. "He is creative, with a constant vision for creating a better product that takes less time and money to produce. He goes after it even when the forces for keeping the status quo seem impenetrable."

"He is utterly courageous", says Hawkins' chief deputy auditor, Lonn Litchfield. "When the powers that be unlawfully took from his control the accounting and budget functions that he had been elected to provide, and that had been in the auditor's office for over 100 years, he had a tough choice to make. Each of his division directors urged him to protect the office by filing a lawsuit. Greg knew that filing a lawsuit would take an enormous personal toll and probably have political consequences. He put aside his personal concerns and filed a lawsuit to maintain the checks and balances that were in the law. Before the court ruled on the merits of the case, the legislature changed the law. Greg believes in the rule of law and tries to follow the law with exactness. When the law was changed, he dropped the lawsuit. Again, he did the courageous thing and sought for reconciliation with his political and legal opponents."

Hawkins' commitment to public service goes beyond good government. Brad Rogers, administrative and fiscal manager of the Auditor's office who has worked for two governors and the Boy Scouts of America, said, "Greg realized we had people in the office with a strong commitment to public service, so we started teaching Boy Scout citizenship merit badge classes once a month. We were hoping for 20 scouts per class, but we have often had more than 100. Greg has helped scouts earn over 2,500 merit badges."

Hawkins lost his bid for reelection in 2014.

== Publications ==
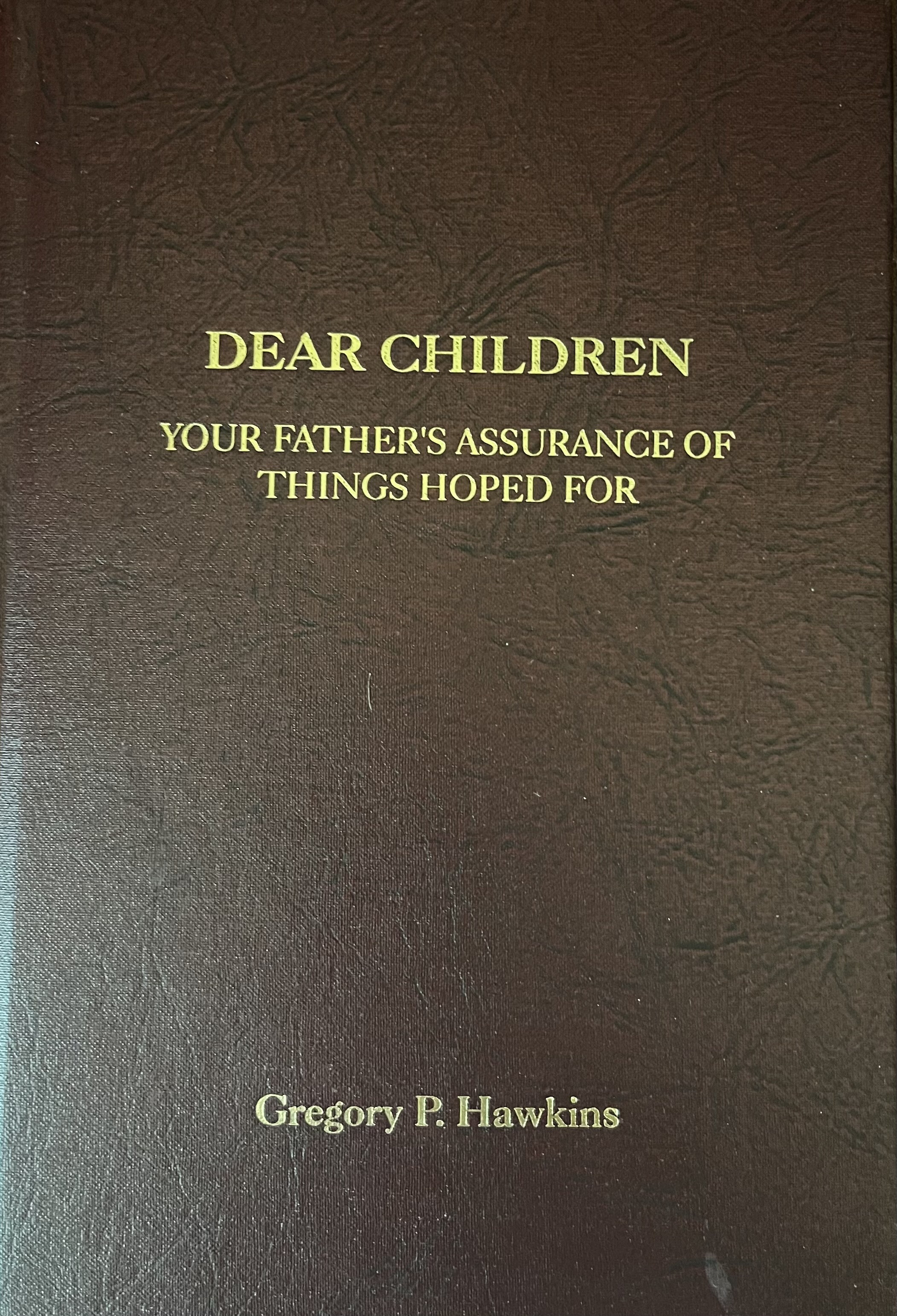

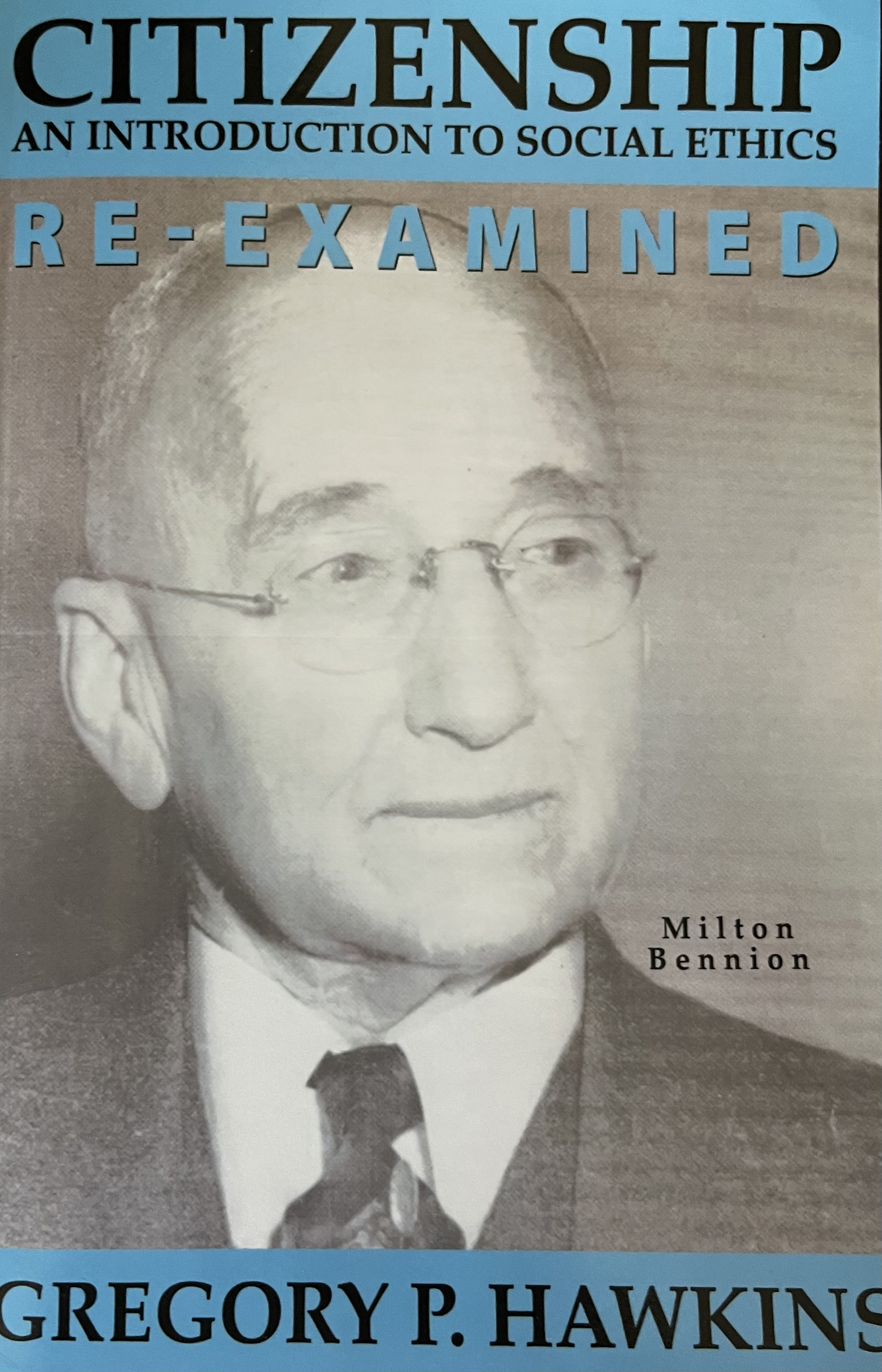

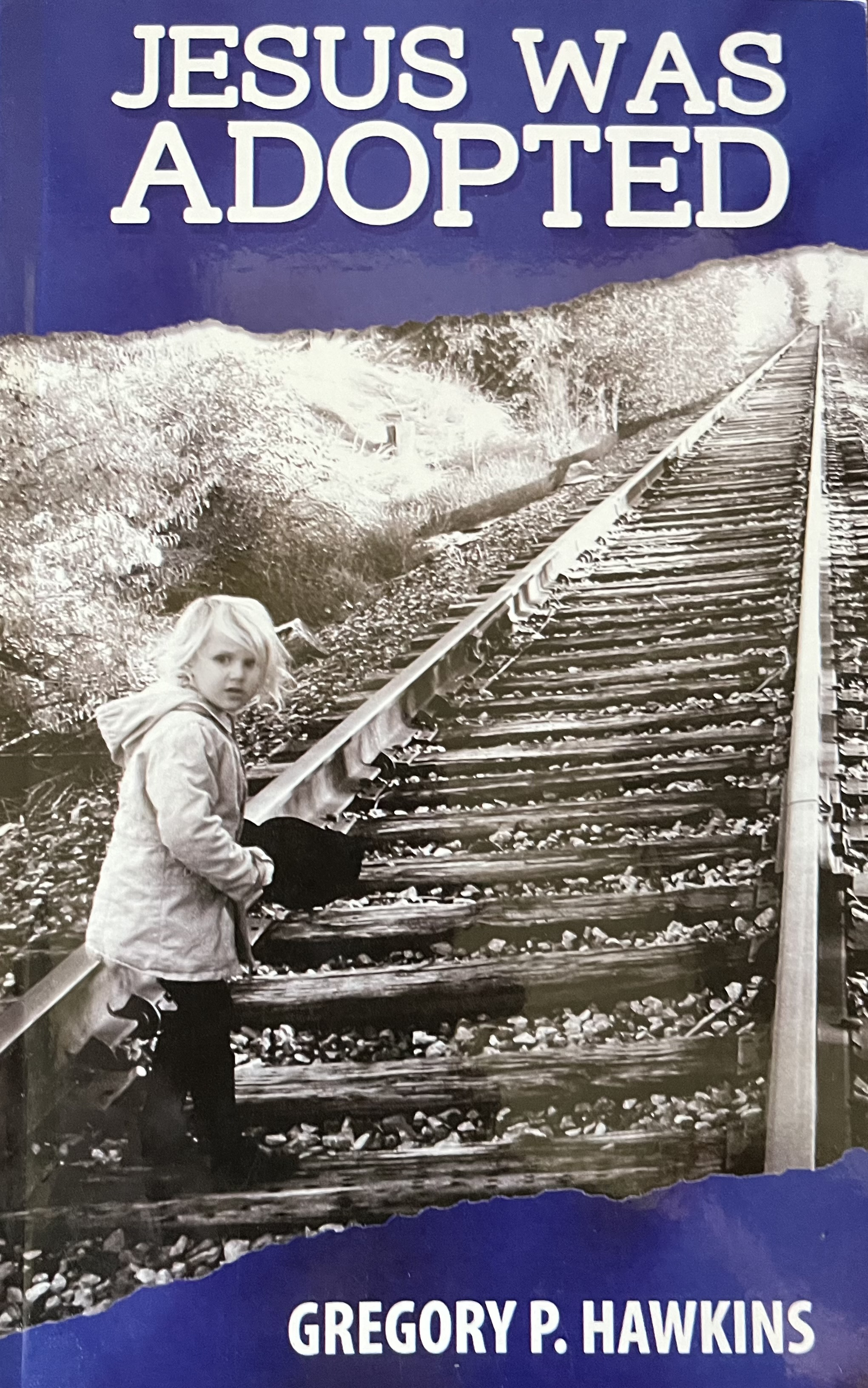

- "IT'S B" A Different Kind of Hero, Epiphany Publishing 2021, ISBN 978-1935821-58-8.
- DEAR CHILDREN, Your Father's Assurance of Things Hoped For, Epiphany Publishing 2020, ISBN 978-1-935821-53-3.
- Aspirational Ethics and the Second Chair w/ Lonn Litchfield, Vol 30, No.3 Utah Bar Journal.
- Top Attorneys of North America - 2017
- CITIZENSHIP, An Introduction to Social Ethics, Re-Examined, Epiphany Publishing (2014) ISBN 978-0984952854
- CORRUPTION, Fraud, Embezzlement, and Other Bad Acts and the Auditors that Found Them, Epiphany Publishing (2014) ISBN 978-0984952847
- WE WERE ADOPTED, Triumph of the Human Spirit from the lives of Celebrated People who were Adopted, Epiphany Publishing (2014) ISBN 978-1-942639-00-8
- A Tale of Two Dead Clients, Utah State Trooper Vol. 20 No. 2.
- The Condescension of God, Epiphany Publishing (2013) ISBN 978-0-9849528-3-0
- Jesus Was Adopted, Epiphany Publishing (2012) ISBN 978-0-9849528-0-9
- Stop the Madness, November/December 2005. Family Voice Magazine.
- Nine Bananas and 18 Monkeys...Oh My! September/October 2005, Family Voice Magazine.
- Memorializing a Nation—and Why We Celebrate, July/August 2005, Family Voice Magazine.
- The Teenagers Top Secret Guide to Getting a Great Job, May/June, 2005, Family Voice Magazine.
- Your Child with Special Needs, Safeguarding Dignity and Quality of Life. November/December 2004, Family Voice Magazine.
- A $5 - A - Day Habit, January/February 2005, Family voice Magazine.
- The Cats and Dogs of Buying a Home, March/April 2005, Family Voice Magazine.
- Managing Your Lawyer, Professional Surveyor magazine, Fall 2002..
- Working with a Lawyer, Inside Self Storage magazine, January 2002.
- The Attorney/Client Relationship, Heating, Plumbing and Air Conditioning magazine January 2002.
- Secrets of Managing Your Lawyer, Horse Professional magazine, November 2001.
- Get Your New Employees Trained Without Breaking the Bank, Southern Graphics magazine, June 2001.
- Training? We Don't Need No Stinking Training, Inside Self Storage magazine, May 2001.
- Beyond Sink-or-Swim Training: Integrating New Staff, Executive Update magazine, April 2001.
- How to Hire the Best Person for the Job, National Cattlemen magazine, January 1994.
- Alternate Dispute Resolution, Podiatry Management magazine, January 1994.
- Managing Your Lawyer, Journal of Property Management magazine, January 1994.
- Attorney Shopping Guide, Your Church magazine, January 1994
- The Living Trust, National Cattlemen magazine, January 1993
- Where There's a Will, Should There be a Trust? Dental Economics magazine, February 1993
- Save Time, Money and Aggravation with Alternate Dispute Resolution, Business Radio Magazine, May 1993
- The Best Person for the Job, Tack 'n Togs magazine, August 1993
- Miracle at West High, This People magazine, December 1990
- Take the Fast Boat to China, Tack 'n Togs magazine, January 1993
- What You Need to Know About the ADA, Business Radio Magazine, March 1993
- ADA, Ready or Not, Here It Is!, Tack 'n Togs, March 1993
- Finding, Hiring and Managing a Lawyer, Tack 'n Togs Magazine, May, 1993
- Managing Your Attorney to Protect Interests Without Ruining the Bank Account, Dental Office Magazine, April 1993
- Handling a Legal Matter, Greenhouse Manager magazine, June 1993
- Alternate Dispute Resolution Offers Viable Option to Traditional Litigation, Dental Office Magazine, July 1993
- Where There's a Will...Should There be a Trust?, Tack 'n Togs Magazine, October 1993
- Legal Counsel: Alternative Dispute Resolution, American Nurseryman Magazine, September 1993
- The Best Way to Deal with the Disabilities Act..., Dental Office magazine, September 1993
- The Living Trust, The Rangefinder magazine, August 1993
- Arbitration: The Fast Track to Negotiations, American Ink Maker magazine, November 1992
- The Americans with Disabilities Act, American Ink Maker Magazine, December 1992
