= Grigorios =

Grigorios or Gregorios (Greek: Γρηγόριος “watchful; alert; awake”, from ἐγρήγορᾰ ), and the variant Grigoris (Γρηγόρης), are the Greek forms of the name Gregory. It can refer to:

- Grigoris (catholicos), 4th-century catholicos of Caucasian Albania and martyr
- Grigorios Argyrokastritis (died 1828), Archbishop of Athens
- Grigoris Arnaoutoglou (born 1973), Greek television presenter and radio producer
- Grigorios Athanasiou (born 1984), Greek football player
- Grigoris Balakian (1875–1934), bishop of the Armenian Apostolic Church
- Grigoris Georgatos (born 1972), Greek footballer
- Grigorios Konstantas (1753–1844), Greek scholar
- Grigoris Lambrakis (1912–1963), Greek politician
- Grigoris Makos (born 1987), Greek footballer
- Grigorios Polychronidis (born 1981), Greek boccia player
- Grigorios Spandidakis (1909–1996), Greek general and minister
- Grigorios Vegleris, Greek-Ottoman official and Prince of Samos
- Gregorios Xenopoulos (1867–1951), Greek writer and educationalist
- Grigorios Zalykis (1785–1827), Greek scholar and diplomat
