= Gregory Haimovsky =

Russian pianist, writer, and pedagogue (born 1926)

Gregory S. Haimovsky (born 13 February 1926) is a Russian pianist, writer, and pedagogue.

Haimovsky was born in Moscow on 13 February 1926. He graduated from Moscow Conservatory in 1950. In the era of Stalin's anti-Semitism, like the fate of many of his contemporaries-musicians, Haimovsky's destiny as a performer was thwarted. Immediately after his graduation concert, despite the formal characterization of the conservatory's administration noting him as an "extremely gifted pianist, outstanding performing abilities ...," he was kicked out of Moscow by the communist regime to Russia's remote provinces, where, except for a short period of creative work in Nizhny Novgorod Conservatory, he spent 16 years isolated from concert stages. However, in 1966, Haimovsky returned to Moscow and entered the mainstream of the capital's musical life as a pianist and writer of music and musicians.

An expert on French music in particular, Haimovsky was the first to bring to Russian musical culture the works of Olivier Messiaen. From 1966 to 1972 as a soloist and in collaboration with the best musicians of the capital, Haimovsky premiered Messiaen's most famous works for the USSR. Among them are: "Quartet for End of Time" (with M. Baranov, V. Tupikin, V. Simon, later recorded by "Melody"), "Visions of Amen" (with I. Katz), "Haravi" (with N. Cherednyakova ), "Three small liturgies of the Divine Presence" (with S. Sandetskis), "Exotic Birds" (with G. Rozhdestvensky), fragments of the works from the "20 Regards of the baby Jesus," "Sketches of rhythm", "Catalogue of Birds". Haimovsky played the solo piano in "Turangalila-Symphony", which was performed for the first time in Russia by the USSR State Symphony Orchestra (conductor Evgeny Svetlanov). Triumph of "Turangalila" in Moscow (1971) was stunning. For his work Haimovsky received a letter of gratitude from the composer.

During this time, Haimovsky published the first articles about Messiaen in “Soviet Music”, receiving considerable attention. In 1968, the publishing house “Soviet Composer” signed a contract with him for the first Russian book on Messiaen. The manuscript was completed in 1970, but was not published due to objections from communist censors.

In the late 1960s, Haimovsky's solo-performing, literary career, organizational activities, and pedagogical deliberations significantly expanded when he joined the "Chamber Ensemble of Soloists of Moscow Radio and TV" (directed by A. Korneev). As a forward-thinker in musical activities, Haimovsky became a mediator between the Soviet composers (among them Nikolai Sidelnikov, Alfred Schnittke, and Boris Tishchenko, among others) and his chamber group. He inspired Sidelnikov to create a number of masterpieces, which were subsequently performed across the USSR and recorded for the "Melodia” label. And yet despite the heights of this creative work in Moscow, a stifling political environment forced Haimovsky to leave the country (Oct 1972).

After his emigration from the USSR, Haimovsky was a professor of Rubin Academy of Music in Jerusalem and a soloist of the Israeli Radio Orchestra. He performed with the Jerusalem Symphony Orchestra, in particular the Israeli premieres of Messiaen ("Three Little Liturgies" with Mendi Rodan, "Exotic Birds" with Paul Kapolongo), performed recitals, made recordings on the radio (Chopin, Haydn, Debussy), and concertized in Europe.

In 1974, the Tel Aviv newspaper Maariv wrote that Haimovsky is "not only a pianist of supreme virtuosity, but above all an artist with a strong personality." This is seconded by Freiburg's Badische Zeitung: "He is a magician of sound." Even after moving to the U.S. (in 1977) the first performances by Haimovsky are generally described as "unusual"; specifically, his Liszt and Messiaen as "breathtaking" (New York Times). In the 1999 release of his American disks of Debussy's piano music, the American Guide wrote: "Every moment on this recording is a jewel ... the second book of Images is a revelation ... this transcendent performance...joins Benedetti Michelangeli, Gieseking, and Arrau..."

Haimovsky received invitations from radio stations for recordings and interviews, particularly in New York, Stuttgart, Jerusalem. Additionally, he has performed in festivals such as “Lyric Art Festival” in Houston and “Russishes Erbe” in Freiburg, and given master classes in the Jerusalem Music Center (under the auspices of Isaac Stern), Istanbul Conservatory, Boston Conservatory, Bard College, and others.

From 1984–2001, Haimovsky was a professor of piano, chamber music, and aesthetics of performance at New York University. At the request of the institution, he founded the NYU Chamber Music Society that performed nearly 40 concerts of contemporary music from all over the world. Concerts involved undergraduate and graduate students, university professors, as well as guests from abroad. Upon leaving the university, Haimovsky returned to his second passion: writing. From 2002 to 2012, he published six books in Russian and translated one for English readers, all for Liberty Publishing House.

Presently, Haimovsky lives with his wife in his home in Yorktown Heights, Westchester (New York). He continues to work as a writer and as a pianist.

== Selected concerts ==
Moscow. Tchaikovsky conservatory. Malyi Hall. February 11, 1968. Olivier Messiaen- Quartet for the End of Time. (premiere). Violin –M. Baranov, Cello- V. Simon, Clarinet- V. Tupikin, Piano- G. Haimovsky; Darius Milhaud- Sonata for Flute- A. Korneev, Oboe- A. Zaiontz, Clarinet- Victor Tupikin, Piano- G. Haimovsky

Gorky. State Philharmonic Concert Hall. April. 27 1967. Olivier Messiaen- First in Russia monographic concert. Program: Quatuor pour la fin du temps, fragments from: Vision de L’ Amen, Harawi, Catalogue of the birds. G. Haimovsky, I. Katz- piano; G, Cherednikova – soprano; M. Baranov- violin, V. Simon – cello; V. Tupikin – Clarinet

Gorky. Concert Hall of Philharmonic. March 9, 1969 Recital by Gregory Haimovsky. Debussy, Ravel, Messiaen

Gorky. Glinka State Conservatory Concert Hall. November 16, 1962. Claude Debussy 24 Preludes For Debussy's 100th Anniversary

Moscow. All Russian House of composers. November 25, 1968. Olivier Messiaen: Exotic birds. The Ensemble of Russian Radio and TV. Conductor- G. Rojdestvensky. Russian premiere

Moscow, All Russian House of Composers. May 20, 1968. Nikolai Sidelnikov Russian Tales. The Ensemble of Russian Radio and TV. Russian premiere

Lithuenia. Vilnius. State Philharmonic Concert Hall. 1968. Debussy: 24 Preludes.

Czechoslovakia, Prague. “Prazske jaro” 1968. Nikolai Sidelnikov “Russian tales”: April 26. 1968. Ensemble of Russian Radio and TV. Piano – G. Haimovsky.

Moscow. Malyi Hall of Tchaikovsky conservatory . Moscow State Philharmonic. Olivier Messiaen- Quartet for the end of time. Mark Baranov – violin, Victor Simon- cello, V. Tupikin- clarinet, G. Haimovsky – piano. Moscow premiere

Moscow. All Russian House of composers. January 6, 1970. Alfred Shnittke Serenade. Clarinet, violino, bass, percussions, piano. World Premiere

Moscow. State Philharmonic. Grand Hall Tchaikovsky Conservatory. ”Festival Moscow Stars” May 8, 1971. Olivier Messiaen Turangalila-Symphony Premiere, Mozart Piano concerto #27, b-flat major. State Symphony Academy Orchestra, USSR. E. Svetlanov- conductor, soloists- Emile Gilels (Mozart) and Gregory Haimovsky (Messiaen)

Jerusalem. Theatre. April 1973. Olivier Messiaen: “Three little Liturgy” (Israeli premiere). Conductor- Mendi Rodan. Pianist- Gregory Haimovsky.

Jerusalem. Music Rubin Academy. Concert Hall. Debussy −12 Preludes, Messiaen- Quartet (Jerusalem premiere)

Paris. Salle Gaveau. March 21, 1977 Piano recital. Brahms, Chopin, Debussy, Messiaen

Germany. Kirchzartener konzerte. March 17, 1979. Program: Beethoven Sonata op.7, e-flat major, Brahms- 4 ballades op. 10, Liszt – Sonata b-minor

Swiss. Zug. Aula Schulhaus Loreto. January 30. 1989. Piano recital: Schumann, Liszt, Chopin, Debussy

Wien. Austria. Brahms- Saal- Musicverein. November 19, 1987. Piano recital. Claude Debussy

Toronto. Canada. Walter Hall. February 1, 1986. Beethoven, Chopin, Debussy.

== Books ==
“In Search of the Isle of joy: A Memoir." Liberty Publishing House, New York. 2001 312p.

“ White Buffalo.” Collection of the stories. Liberty Publishing House. New York. 2002. 140p.

“White Buffalo: Fantastic Suite." English version – co-author, Marissa Silverman. Liberty Publishing House. New York. 2005. 150 p.

“Testament of Raphael.” Novel. 1st volume of the trilogy. Liberty Publishing House. New York. 2006. 159 p.

“Violino d’Amore.” Novel. 2nd volume of the trilogy. Liberty Publishing House. New York. 2008. 199p.

“Olivier Messiaen in my life.” Biographical essay. Liberty Publishing House. New York. 2009. 273p.

“Dilettante.” Novel. 3d volume of the trilogy. Liberty Publishing House. New York. 2012. 271p

== Recordings ==
Olivier Messiaen. “Quartet for the End of Time.” Moscow . Melodia. L.P. 1968 (Violin, Cello, Clarinet, Piano).

Manuel de Falla. Concerto for Harpsichord, Flute, Clarinet, Violin, Cello. Moscow. Melodia. 1968. L.P.

Darius Milhaud. Sonata for Flute, Oboe, Clarinet, Piano. Moscow. Melodia. 1969. L.P.

Nikolai Sidelnikov. “Russian Tales.” Ensemble and piano. Moscow. Melodia. L.P. (Nonet, Piano, percussion).

Debussy Preludes. Book 1, 1984. L.P.; Book 2, 1985. L.P. “ Poesia Music” Inc. New York.1985. Recording studio of SUNY Purchase. Library of Congress Catalogue card number: 85-743083 FIRST EDITION

Debussy Preludes. Musical Heritage Society. SECOND EDITION 1986. Library of Congress card Number: 86-743101 L.P.

Brahms Ballades Op.10. Chopin- two Nocturnes. Liszt- 4th Forgotten Waltz, Sonetto 123.1985. L.P. “Poesia Music.” Recorded at the State University of the N.Y. SUNY at Purchase. Sound engineer and produsser Gregory K. Squires

Mozart Piano Concertos, First Three Viennese Piano Concertos, K. 414, K. 413, K. 415. Moscow Chamber Ensemble, Alexander Vederniikov, conductor. Produced by Savva Sidelnikov. Engineered by Gennady Papin and Vladmir Kieslev. Recorded: Moscow Concert Hall of "Mosfilm Corporation." Released by “Helicon Record” 1997

Debussy Preludes, Book 1 and 2; Children's Corner Suite, and Images Book2 (1987) 2 CDs. Produced and engineered by Gregory K. Squires. Released by “Helicon Record” 1999

“Poetical Inspirations” Vol 1. MSR CLASSIC. MS.1048. Released 2003 CD

”Poetical Inspirations” Vol 2. MSR CLASSIC. MS. 1100. Released 2004 CD

Mozart Piano Concertos, K. 246 & K. 271. Russian Philharmony of Moscow, Alexander Vedernikov, conductor. Produced by Gregory K. Squires. Released by Musicians Showcase Recordings. 2005.
