= Gregory Spaid =

American artist

Gregory Preston Spaid (born 1946) is an American artist known for his photographic and mixed media works.

== Early life ==
Spaid was born in Misihiwaka, Indiana. He studied at Kenyon College, receiving a B.A. degree in 1969, and at Indiana University, Bloomington, where he received an M.F.A. in art in 1976, having worked with the renowned photographer Henry Holmes Smith. He has been a professor of art at Kenyon College since 1979. From 1999 to 2002, Spaid moved to a position of Associate Provost at Kenyon College, serving as Acting Provost during the Academic Year 2002–03. He was named Kenyon's Provost in 2003, a position he held until 2008. He lives in Gambier, Ohio.

== Collections ==
His work is included in the collections of the Getty Museum, the Museum of Modern Art, New York and the Smithsonian Museum of American Art.

== Publications ==
Books

Grace: Photographs of Rural America. Asheville, NC: Safe Harbor Books, 2000.

On Nantucket. Asheville, NC: Safe Harbor Books, 2002.

Co-Author

Logsdon, Gene. The Man Who Created Paradise: A Fable. Foreword by Wendell Berry. Photography by Gregory Spaid. Athens, Ohio: Ohio University Press, 2001.
