= Gregorio López (jurist) =

Gregorio López (Guadalupe, Cáceres, Spain 1496 - 1560) was a president of the Consejo de Indias, humanist, jurist and lawyer.

López's most important work is an annotated edition of the Siete Partidas published for the first time in 1555. The Siete Partidas is a legal code divided into seven parts (partidas) compiled under the reign of Alfonso X the Wise, and which was followed for centuries in Spain, Latin America, and the United States. It was considered to be the authentic text of the medieval work of the Castilian king. The annotated copy contains López's certification as of 7 September 1555, that it is a true copy of the earlier text; however, no one has established which manuscript or manuscripts were used for the edition.

López served as mayor of the Puebla de Guadalupe, a municipality in the province of Cáceres. He married the niece of Conquistador Francisco Pizarro. He died in Guadalupe in 1560 and was buried in the city's Monasterio de Santa María (Monastery of Santa Maria). The front of his Italian Renaissance-style palace survives to today.

He is sometimes confused with Gregorio López de Tovar, his grandson.
