= Gregorio López (handballer) =

Spanish handball player (1951-1987)

Gregorio López Pelayo (29 September 1951 – 8 June 1987) was a Spanish handball player who competed in the 1980 Summer Olympics. In 1980 he finished fifth with the Spanish team in the Olympic tournament. He played all six matches and scored twelve goals.
