= Gregor =

Gregor is a masculine given name. Notable people and fictional characters with the name include:

- Gregor (musician) (1898–1971), Armenian bandleader
- Gregor Abel (born 1949), Scottish footballer
- Gregor Adlercreutz (1898–1944), Swedish equestrian
- Gregor Aichinger (c. 1565–1628), German composer
- Gregor Amann (born 1962), German politician
- Gregor Arbet (born 1983), Estonian basketball player
- Gregor Bailar (born 1963), American businessman
- Gregor Bajde (born 1994), Slovenian footballer
- Gregor Balažic (born 1988), Slovenian footballer
- Gregor Baumgartner (born 1979), Austrian ice hockey player
- Gregor Becke (born 1972), Austrian canoer
- Gregor Belkovsky (1865–1948), Zionist activist
- Gregor Benko (born 1944), American music historian
- Gregor Bermbach (born 1981), German bobsledder
- Gregor Betz (born 1948), German swimmer
- Gregor Bialowas (born 1959), Austrian weightlifter
- Gregor Blanco (born 1983), Venezuelan baseball player
- Gregor Blatnik (born 1972), Slovenian footballer
- Gregor Brandmüller (1661–1691), Swiss painter
- Gregor Braun (born 1955), German cyclist
- Gregor Breinburg (born 1991), Aruban footballer
- Gregor Brown (born 2001), Scottish rugby union player
- Gregor Brück (1483–1557), German figure of the Reformation, and Saxon Chancellor
- Gregor Buchanan (born 1990), Scottish footballer
- Gregor Cailliet, American scientist
- Gregor Cameron (born 1964), New Zealand athlete
- Gregor Cankar (born 1975), Slovenian long jumper
- Gregor Chatsatourian (born 1977), Greek handball player
- Gregor Clemens (born 1982), German fashion designer
- Gregor Collins (born 1976), American actor, writer and producer
- Gregor Croudis (born 1993), New Zealand cricketer
- Gregor Cvijič (born 1972), Slovenian handball player
- Gregor Deschwanden (born 1991), Swiss ski jumper
- Gregor Dorfmeister (1929–2018), German writer
- Gregor Duncan (artist) (1910–1944), American illustrator
- Gregor Duncan (bishop) (born 1950), Scottish Episcopalian bishops
- Gregor Ebner (1892–1974), German military doctor
- Gregor Edelmann (born 1954), German journalist and screenwriter
- Gregor Edmunds (born 1977), Scottish athlete
- Gregor Erhart, German sculptor
- Gregor Ewan (born 1971), Scottish wheelchair curler
- Gregor Fink (born 1984), Slovenian footballer
- Gregor Fisher (born 1953), Scottish comedian and actor
- Gregor Fisken (born 1964), British racing driver
- Gregor Foitek (born 1965), Swiss racing driver
- Gregor Fučka (born 1971), Slovenian-Italian basketball player and coach
- Gregor Gall (born 1967), British academic
- Gregor Gazvoda (born 1981), Slovenian cyclist
- Gregor George, Australian rugby union player
- Gregor Gillespie (born 1987), American mixed martial artist
- Gregor Glas (born 2001), Slovenian basketball player
- Gregor Golobič (born 1964), Slovenian politician
- Gregor Grant (born 1911), British writer
- Gregor Grilc (born 1970), Slovenian alpine skier
- Gregor Gysi (born 1948), German politician
- Gregor Hagedorn (born 1965), German botanist
- Gregor Haloander (1501–1531), German legal scholar
- Gregor Hammerl (born 1942), Austrian politician
- Gregor Hasler, Swiss psychiatrist
- Gregor Hauffe (born 1982), German rower
- Gregor Hayter (born 1976), Scottish rugby union player
- Gregor Helfenstein (1559–1632), Roman Catholic prelate
- Gregor Henderson, Australian Christian minister
- Gregor Herzfeld (born 1975), German musicologist
- Gregor Hildebrandt (born 1974), German contemporary artist
- Gregor Jordan (born 1966), Australian film director
- Gregor Mackintosh, lead guitarist and main composer of English doom metal band Paradise Lost
- Gregor McGregor (1848–1914), Australian politician
- Gregor Mendel (1822–1884), scientist, father of genetics
- Gregor Mühlberger (born 1994), Austrian cyclist
- Gregor Wilhelm Nitzsch (1790–1861), German classical scholar
- Gregor Piatigorsky (1903–1976), Russian-born American cellist
- Gregor Schlierenzauer (born 1990), Austrian ski jumper
- Gregor Strasser (1892–1934), German Nazi Party official and politician
- Gregor Townsend (born 1973), Scottish rugby union player and coach
- Gregor Urbas (born 1982), Slovenian figure skater
- Gregor Verbinski (born 1964), American film director, also known as Gore Verbinski
- Gregor Virant (born 1969), Slovenian politician
- Gregor Weiss (born 1941), American artistic gymnast
- Gregor Wenning (born 1964), German neurologist
- Gregor Wentzel (1898–1978), German physicist
- Gregor Werner (1693–1766), Austrian classical composer
- Gregor Widholm (born 1948), Austrian academic and musician
- Gregor Willmes (born 1966), German musicologist
- Gregor W. Yeates (1944–2012), New Zealand scientist
- Gregor Young (born 1966), Canadian soccer player and coach

== Fictional characters ==
- Gregor Clegane, nicknamed "The Mountain", a character in George R.R. Martin's A Song of Ice and Fire and its television adaptation Game of Thrones
- Gregor Samsa, main character of Franz Kafka's The Metamorphosis
- King Gregor Markov, a supporting character in DC Comics' Young Justice's third season
- Gregor, a beetle-shaped demon in the novel Slawter
- Gregor, a clone commando from the Star Wars franchise
- Gregor, the protagonist of The Underland Chronicles
- Gregor, the slave name given to Severin by Wanda in the Leopold von Sacher-Masoch novel Venus In Furs
- Gregor, one of the 12 playable characters in Limbus Company who is based on Gregor Samsa.

== See also ==
- Gregory (given name)
