= Grigorovich =

Grigorovich (Russian: Григорович), is a Slavic patronymic surname meaning "son of Grigory (Gregory)". It may be a Russified form of the Ukrainian patronymic surname Hryhorovych meaning "son of Hryhoriy". Belarusian variant: Hryharovich, Polish equivalent: Gregorowicz ("son of Gregor"). Other variants include Grigorovitch, Grigorovičs, etc.

"Hryhorovych" can also be a patronymic (middle part) of a Ukrainian name, such as in "Taras Hryhorovych Shevchenko". The corresponding Russian patronymic from "Grigory" is "Grigoryevich", as in "Sergei Grigoryevich Stroganov". The Belarusian patronymic from "Hryhor/Hryhoriy" is "Hryhoravich". The native Belarusian forms are Ryhor/Ryhoravich.

Notable people with the surname include:

- Dmitry Grigorovich (1822–1900), a Russian writer
- Dmitry Pavlovich Grigorovich (1883–1938), a Soviet aircraft designer
- Ivan Grigorovich (1853–1930), a Russian admiral
- Ivan Grigorovich-Barsky (1713–1785), a Ukrainian architect
- Konstantin Petrovich Grigorovich (1886–1939), metallurgical engineer, one of the founders of the Soviet electrometallurgy
- Luba Grigorovitch, Australian politician
- Vasil Grigorovich-Barsky (1701–1747), Ukrainian Orthodox monk
- Victor Grigorovich (1815–1876), a Russian Slavonic scholar
- Yury Grigorovich (1927–2025), Soviet and Russian ballet dancer, ballet master, and choreographer
