= Gregorovich =

Gregorovich is a patronymic surname of Slavic origins literally meaning "son of Gregor"; -ich is a Slavic patronymic suffix. It may be a translation of the Ukrainian surname Hryhorovych (Григорович), a phonetic respelling of the Polish Gregorowicz, or of South Slavic Gregorović or Gregorovič. Notable people with the surname include:

- Andrew Gregorovich, Canadian librarian, known as the author of the 1999 English edition of the correspondence between the Ottoman sultan and the Cossacks, Ukrainian diaspora activist
- John B. Gregorovich, the first chairman of the Ukrainian Canadian Civil Liberties Association
- Gregorovich, pen name of Chaim Zhitlowsky (1865–1943), Russian socialist and philosopher

== Fictional characters ==
- Gregorovich, fictional art critic in the 965 American splatter film Color Me Blood Red
- Gregor Gregorovich, a villain from Blue Trinity by DC Comics, that debuted in The Flash
- Yassen Gregorovich, a villain from Anthony Horowitz's Alex Rider series

== See also ==
- Grigorovich
