= Brandmüller =

Brandmüller is a surname. Notable people with the surname include:

- Gregor Brandmüller (1661–1690), Swiss painter
- Theo Brandmüller (1948–2012), German composer, organist, and teacher
- Walter Brandmüller (born 1929), German Roman Catholic prelate
