= Chernysh =

Chernysh (Ukrainian: Черниш, Russian: Черныш) is a gender-neutral Russian and Ukrainian surname. It may refer to the following notable people:

- Denys Chernysh (born 1999), Ukrainian footballer
- Dmytro Chernysh (born 1998), Ukrainian footballer
- Hryhoriy Chernysh (born 1942), Ukrainian politician
- Vadym Chernysh (born 1971), Ukrainian jurist and politician
