= Grigori 3 =

American metal band

- Origin: Chicago, Illinois, U.S.
- Genres: Industrial Metal
- Years active: 1999 to present
- Label: Darkstar Records
- Members: Gwen Bartolini, Ray R Wise, Brian BradBury, Chris Beller and Mike Marcinkowski.
- Past members: Grayson Gallegos, Mike Kmak, Justin Bailey, Drew Turnbaugh, Mike Lindsay
- Website: http://www.grigori3.com

Grigori 3 is an American metal band formed in 1999 with Gwen Bartolini (vocals) and Ray Wise (guitar). Past members included Grayson Gallegos, Justin Bailey, Mike Lindsay, and Mike Kmak brother of Steve Kmak "Fuzz", the former bassist for Disturbed. The current line-up includes Gwen Bartolini (vocals), Ray R Wise (guitar), Chris Beller (drums), Brain Bradbury (keyboard) and Mike Marcinkowski (bass). Their music is commonly compared to Evanescence, Collide and Lacuna Coil. Grigori 3 released their debut album, Exile, in 2006 followed by their sophomore album "On your 6" in 2012 through Dark Star Records. Currently the band is back in the studio working on their third album with no release date as of yet. The name Grigori relates to a race of fallen angels from mythology, and the number 3 represents "completion."

== History ==
=== Early years ===
In 1998, the founding members of Grigori 3, Ray R Wise and Gwen Bartolini met in a local coffee shop with a mutual friend to discuss the possibilities of a new musical project.

With the recent break up of "Zero Tolerance", a local thrash band Wise was hired as the guitarist, he wished to pursue a new sound and with a female vocalist. Attending a show where the alternative/acoustical band "Dishwater" played, Wise noticed Bartolini's vocals first hand and wished to start a new project with her. Bartolini agreed. Through an ad, they found drummer Grayson Gallegos who introduced them in the direction of Lacuna Coil, Collide and The Gathering. Soon after Brian BradBury, an old friend and former bandmate of Bartolini's from the band "Dartanian" joined as keyboardist. The foursome throughout names to each other but it wasn't until Wise brought the name Grigori to their attention that the band agreed on something.

Gwen and I were in this candle like Gothic shop and I saw a list with the names of different angels and their origins. I remember seeing that the Grigori we're angels sent down to help mankind but instead corrupted us with greed and sex. I thought it was a twisted yet perfect description of major record labels, I mean at first, they claim they can help the artist but instead usually exploit, rip them off, and reap the rewards. We added the number 3 later because it is the sign of completion and everything usually happens in threes. Gwen though 3 was also good luck since it represents the Holy Trinity and since Grigori is a race of fallen angels, the 3 balances it out. Good and Evil equaled." ~ Wise

After a year of writing the band decided to record their first demo and in 1999 and did so at Sheffield studio in IN. A two song was planned but before they did their first session Gallegos left the band and BradBury recorded the drum tracks via keyboards. After a month they rescheduled and recorded the songs "Night Aire" and "Spectre". The band shopped the demo and passed out copies at local venues in hopes of finding a permanent bass player and a new drummer. Their planned work, for they recruited drummer Mike Lindsay and bass player Mike Kmak brother of Steve Kmak "Fuzz" former bassist of Disturbed. At the time Lindsay was Kmak's roommate and both had been in the band "Human Gallery" which had recently disbanded. The band then started rehearsing at Kmaks house and began writing more songs.

=== 2001-2005 ===
In 2001, Grigori 3, now a full band, recorded their first EP entitled "Megotholis" at ARS studios in IL. The project took nearly two months to complete and included the songs "Megotholis", "Black Sky", "Untold" and the club hit "Awakening". During many sessions, the band was growing unhappy with the mixes and discussed re-recording their tracks at another studio, but ultimately agreed on finishing the EP at ARS and shopping it as a "Rough cut Demo". The demo grew popularity and because of its dance beats "Awakening" was in heavy rotation within the national Gothic/industrial club scenes. Soon afterward the band returned to the studio and recorded their third demo with the songs "The System" and "Feast" at Porterhouse studios in Lockport IL.

With the band's new found fanbase they began to play clubs and venues across the Chicago area, but it wasn't until Jack Dean Stauss, CEO of Dark Future Music recruited Grigori 3 for a compilation that the band gained international recognition.

Awakening was remixed and featured on "The Best of Gothic Radio Vol 1" Compilation receiving worldwide reviews. The band was praised for their mixture of traditional Goth melodies mixed with Heavy Metal tones and riffs. Labeled as a "Hybrid" Grigori 3 extended their audience and began touring out of state and performing with national acts.
