= Kregor =

Kregor is a male given name. Notable people with the name include:

- Kregor Hermet (born 1997), Estonian basketball player
- Kregor Zirk (born 1999), Estonian swimmer

== See also ==
- Gregor
