= Harry Potter and the Deathly Hallows – Part 1 =

2010 film by David Yates

- Theatrical release poster
- Directed by: David Yates
- Screenplay by: Steve Kloves
- Based on: Harry Potter and the Deathly Hallows by J. K. Rowling
- Produced by: David Heyman; David Barron; J. K. Rowling
- Starring: Daniel Radcliffe; Rupert Grint; Emma Watson; Helena Bonham Carter; Robbie Coltrane; Warwick Davis; Ralph Fiennes; Michael Gambon; Brendan Gleeson; Richard Griffiths; John Hurt; Rhys Ifans; Jason Isaacs; Bill Nighy; Alan Rickman; Fiona Shaw; Timothy Spall; Imelda Staunton; David Thewlis
- Cinematography: Eduardo Serra
- Edited by: Mark Day
- Music by: Alexandre Desplat
- Production companies: Warner Bros. Pictures; Heyday Films
- Distributed by: Warner Bros. Pictures
- Release dates: 11 November 2010 (Odeon Leicester Square); 19 November 2010 (United Kingdom and United States)
- Running time: 146 minutes
- Countries: United Kingdom; United States
- Language: English
- Budget: $250 million (shared with Part 2)
- Box office: $1.061 billion

Harry Potter and the Deathly Hallows – Part 1 is a 2010 fantasy film directed by David Yates from a screenplay by Steve Kloves. The first of two cinematic parts based on the 2007 novel Harry Potter and the Deathly Hallows by J. K. Rowling, it is the sequel to Harry Potter and the Half-Blood Prince (2009) and the seventh instalment in the Harry Potter film series. The film stars Daniel Radcliffe as Harry Potter, with Rupert Grint and Emma Watson reprising roles as Harry's best friends Ron Weasley and Hermione Granger, respectively. The film follows Harry as he has been asked by Albus Dumbledore to find and destroy Lord Voldemort's secret to immortality – the Horcruxes.

Filming began on 19 February 2009 and was completed on 12 June 2010, being shot back-to-back with its sequel Part 2. The film was released in 2D cinemas and IMAX formats in the United Kingdom and in the United States on 19 November 2010, by Warner Bros. Pictures. (Note: Attributed to multiple references:) In the film's worldwide opening weekend, Part 1 grossed $330 million, the third-highest in the series, and the highest opening of 2010, as well as the eighth-highest of all time. With a worldwide gross of $960 million, Part 1 became the third-highest-grossing film of 2010, the tenth highest-grossing film ever at the time and the third-highest-grossing Harry Potter film in terms of worldwide totals.

The film received positive reviews, and was nominated for many awards, including the Academy Award for Best Art Direction and Best Visual Effects. The film was followed by the concluding entry, Harry Potter and the Deathly Hallows – Part 2 in July 2011.

== Plot ==
In 1997, Severus Snape meets with Lord Voldemort and his Death Eaters at Malfoy Manor, reporting that the Order of the Phoenix will move Harry Potter, no longer under his mother's protective spell, to a safe location. Voldemort and the Death Eaters travel to Surrey to apprehend Harry, killing Hedwig and Mad-Eye Moody in the process. Harry escapes to the home of his friend, Ron Weasley, where they and Hermione Granger are visited by the new Minister for Magic Rufus Scrimgeour. He leaves them all a bequest from Albus Dumbledore: Ron a Deluminator, Hermione a copy of The Tales of Beedle the Bard, and Harry the Golden Snitch he caught in his first Quidditch match. Dumbledore also bequeathed the Sword of Gryffindor to Harry, but it has gone missing.

During the wedding of Bill Weasley and Fleur Delacour, the guests are informed that the Ministry has fallen and Scrimgeour is dead. When they are attacked by Death Eaters, Harry, Ron, and Hermione escape to Number 12, Grimmauld Place, where Ron works out that Sirius Black's brother, Regulus, stole Salazar Slytherin's locket from Voldemort. Learning that thief Mundungus Fletcher later sold it to Dolores Umbridge, the three infiltrate the Ministry and recover the locket. Discovered by Death Eaters, Hermione hastily disapparates them to a forest, where they start their journey to discover and destroy all of Voldemort's Horcruxes, beginning with the locket.

After failing to destroy the locket, Hermione deduces that Gryffindor's sword can destroy Horcruxes because it is impregnated with basilisk venom. Ron, affected by the dark locket, is frustrated with their slow progress and becomes irrationally jealous of Harry and Hermione, leaving them after arguing angrily with Harry. Harry and Hermione search for the sword in Godric's Hollow, where Hermione notices a strange symbol in the graveyard that matches one on the cover of Beedle the Bard and one worn by Luna Lovegood's father, Xenophilius. Elderly historian Bathilda Bagshot leads the two to her cottage, where they find a photo of the young man Harry saw in a vision stealing a wand from wandmaker Gregorovitch, before Bagshot morphs into Voldemort's snake Nagini and attacks Harry. Hermione disapparates them to safety, but breaks Harry's wand doing so.

The two arrive in the Forest of Dean, where Hermione identifies the man in the photo as dark wizard Gellert Grindelwald, and Harry follows a doe patronus to the frozen pond where Gryffindor's sword lies on the bottom. After Harry dives in, the locket begins strangling him, but he is rescued by Ron, who also retrieves the sword. Ron then destroys the locket and the next day he explains the Deluminator led him to their location. The three visit Xenophilius and learn that the symbol represents the Deathly Hallows. As told in Beedle the Bard, three brothers once each received a prize for evading Death: the Resurrection Stone, the Cloak of Invisibility, and the Elder Wand, the most powerful wand known. Possessing all three makes one the Master of Death. Xenophilius then secretly summons the Death Eaters, wanting to exchange Harry for Luna, who is being held at Malfoy Manor.

The three are captured by Snatchers and brought to Malfoy Manor, where Harry sees a vision of an elderly Grindelwald telling Voldemort that the Elder Wand is buried with Dumbledore. Bellatrix Lestrange sees a Snatcher with Gryffindor's sword that she believed was in her Gringotts vault. Harry and Ron are locked into the cellar with Luna, Ollivander, and Griphook, while Bellatrix tortures Hermione. Harry sees a man resembling Dumbledore in a mirror shard and begs for help, which summons Dobby to the cellar; they retrieve Hermione and their captured wands from Draco Malfoy, but as they all disapparate Bellatrix fatally wounds Dobby, who dies as they arrive at Bill and Fleur's seaside cottage, an Order safe house. Meanwhile, Voldemort retrieves the Elder Wand from Dumbledore's tomb.

== Cast ==
- Daniel Radcliffe as Harry Potter: A 17-year-old wizard.
- Rupert Grint as Ron Weasley: A young wizard and one of Harry's best friends.
- Emma Watson as Hermione Granger: A young witch and one of Harry's best friends.
- Helena Bonham Carter as Bellatrix Lestrange: A Death Eater and the aunt of Draco Malfoy.
- Robbie Coltrane as Rubeus Hagrid: Harry's half-giant friend and the gamekeeper at Hogwarts.
- Ralph Fiennes as Lord Voldemort: An evil power-hungry wizard and the leader of the Death Eaters.
- Michael Gambon as Professor Albus Dumbledore: The previous headmaster of Hogwarts killed by Severus Snape.
- Brendan Gleeson as Alastor 'Mad-Eye' Moody: A member of the Order of the Phoenix.
- Richard Griffiths as Vernon Dursley: Harry's Muggle uncle.
- John Hurt as Garrick Ollivander: A wandmaker abducted by the Death Eaters.
- Rhys Ifans as Xenophilius Lovegood: Luna Lovegood's eccentric father.
- Jason Isaacs as Lucius Malfoy: Draco's father and a disgraced Death Eater.
- Evanna Lynch as Luna Lovegood: Quirky friend of Harry's
- Bill Nighy as Rufus Scrimgeour: The Minister for Magic.
- Alan Rickman as Professor Severus Snape: A double agent to the Death Eaters and the new headmaster of Hogwarts.
- Fiona Shaw as Petunia Dursley: Harry's Muggle aunt.
- Timothy Spall as Peter Pettigrew: The Death Eater who betrayed Harry's parents to Voldemort.
- Imelda Staunton as Dolores Umbridge: The Senior Undersecretary to the Minister for Magic and Head of the Muggle-born Registration Commission.
- David Thewlis as Remus Lupin: A member of the Order of the Phoenix and former teacher at Hogwarts.
- Bonnie Wright as Ginny Weasley: Ron's sister and Harry's love interest

The film also features Warwick Davis as Griphook, a goblin and former employee at the bank Gringotts; Toby Jones as Dobby, the house elf that Harry saves from the Malfoy family; Tom Felton as Draco Malfoy, Lucius's son and a Death Eater; Helen McCrory as Narcissa Malfoy, Draco's mother and Bellatrix's sister. Julie Walters, Mark Williams, Clémence Poésy, and Natalia Tena appear as members of the Order of the Phoenix Molly Weasley, Arthur Weasley, Fleur Delacour, and Nymphadora Tonks respectively. It also features Dave Legeno as Fenrir Greyback, a werewolf and supporter of Voldemort; Simon McBurney as Kreacher, a house elf; Nick Moran as Scabior, a bounty hunter for Voldemort; Peter Mullan as Corban Yaxley, a Death Eater at the Ministry of Magic; and David O'Hara as Albert Runcorn, an employee at the Ministry of Magic impersonated by Harry.

Domhnall Gleeson, James and Oliver Phelps, George Harris, and Andy Linden appear as members of the Order of the Phoenix Bill Weasley, twins Fred and George Weasley, Kingsley Shacklebolt, and Mundungus Fletcher respectively, while Matthew Lewis appear as Harry's friend Neville Longbottom. Other cast members include Hazel Douglas as the corpse of Bathilda Bagshot; David Ryall as Albus Dumbledore's old schoolfriend Elphias Doge; Frances de la Tour as the head of Beauxbatons Madame Maxime; Guy Henry as Pius Thicknesse, a puppet Minister of Magic installed by Voldemort; Rade Šerbedžija as the wandmaker Gregorovitch; and Carolyn Pickles as Charity Burbage, the Muggle Studies teacher at Hogwarts, tortured and killed by Voldemort.

== Production ==
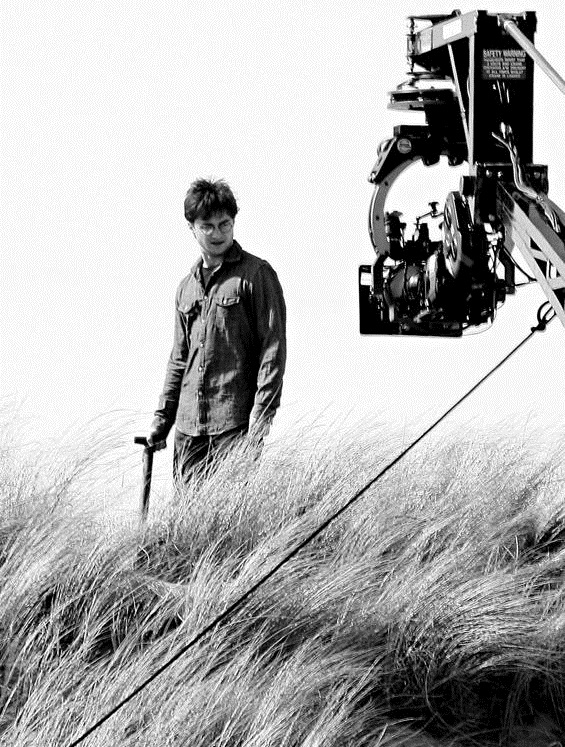
Daniel Radcliffe filming Dobby's death scene in Pembrokeshire, Wales

Part 1 was filmed back-to-back with Harry Potter and the Deathly Hallows – Part 2 from 19 February 2009 to 12 June 2010. Director David Yates, who shot the film alongside director of photography Eduardo Serra, described Part 1 as "quite real"; a "road movie" that's "almost like a vérité documentary".

Originally set for a single theatrical release, the idea to split the book into two parts was suggested by executive producer Lionel Wigram due to what David Heyman called "creative imperative". Heyman initially responded negatively to the idea, but Wigram asked, "No, David. How are we going to do it?". After rereading the book and discussing it with screenwriter Steve Kloves, he agreed with the division.

The production filmed at the Dartford Crossing for the dramatic chase where Harry and Hagrid are being ambushed by Death Eaters.

=== Sets ===
Stuart Craig, set designer for all of the previous Harry Potter films, returned for the final two parts. He said, "We made a very different kind of film, which was shot a great deal on location. We travelled quite far, we built sets, and they spend a lot of time in a forest," he explained. "We built forest sets and integrated them into the real forests, so there were challenges there, as you might imagine." Craig was ultimately nominated for an Academy Award for his work on Part 1.

On the wedding tent for Bill and Fleur's wedding in Part 1, Craig commented on his aim to "rather than make it an extension of the house, which is rather eccentric, homemade, we decided to make it rather elegant . . . It's lined with silk and beautiful, floating candelabra. So it's a nice contrast with the house." For the Ministry of Magic set, he noted, "This is an underground world; this is a ministry, so we went to the real ministries, the Muggle ministries – Whitehall, in London – and decided that our magical ministry was kind of a parallel universe to these real ministries."

Craig also commented on his design of Malfoy Manor, saying that it is "a very strong architectural set. The exterior is based on an Elizabethan house here in this country called Hardwick Hall and it has massive windows, and these windows are kind of blinded out. The shutters are drawn so they are like blind windows and they have a real kind of presence, an ominous presence, so that gave us the basis for a good exterior. There's an extraordinary magical roof that's added and surrounded by forest which isn't there in reality, but again is one of the devices to make it more threatening and mysterious."

=== Costumes ===
The costumes for Part 1 were designed by Jany Temime, who has been the costume designer on Harry Potter productions since Harry Potter and the Prisoner of Azkaban (2004). Temime was involved in a controversy regarding her work on Fleur Delacour's wedding dress. She was accused of copying the design from a similar dress from Alexander McQueen's Fall 2008 collection. Temime spoke about the dress, saying that she "wanted it to be a witch wedding dress but not a Halloween dress. The dress is white but it needed to have something fantastic to it. So there is the phoenix [motif], the bird, which is a symbol of love in a way because there is rebirth, love never dies, it is born again."

=== Visual effects ===
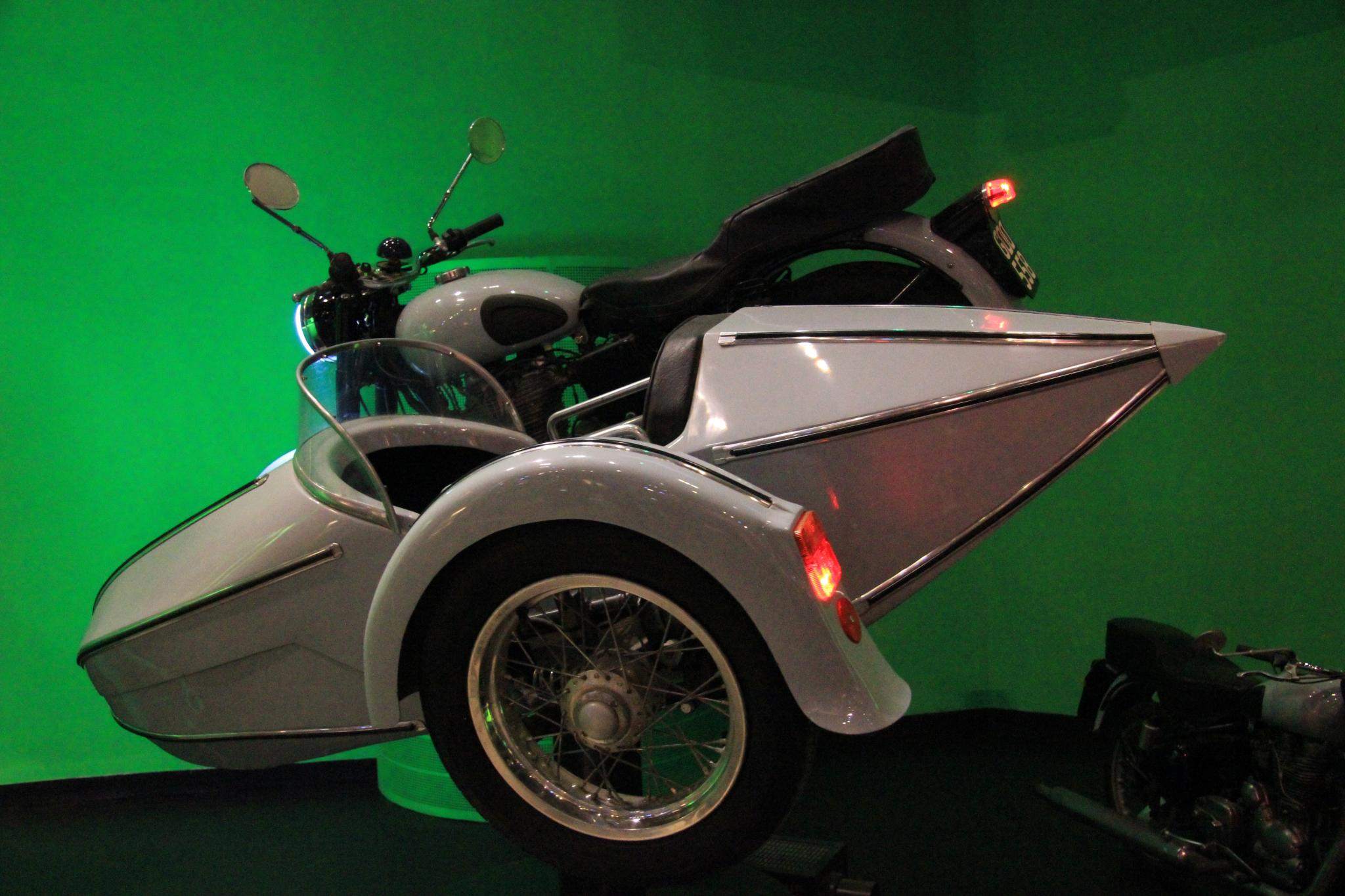
The motorcycle with a sidecar used by Hagrid and Harry in the film

After working on every film since Prisoner of Azkaban, Double Negative was asked to provide visual effects for the final instalments of the story, in Harry Potter and the Deathly Hallows – Parts 1 and 2. Working closely with the film's VFX Supervisor, Tim Burke, the team was led by VFX Supervisor, David Vickery and VFX Producer Charlotte Loughlane. The main team also included 3D Supervisor, Rick Leary and 2D Supervisor, Sean Stranks.

Double Negative's work for Part 1 included the corroding Warner Bros. Pictures logo and extensive environment extensions of the Burrows and its surrounds. Additional environment work was completed on Xenophilius Lovegood's home, extending it in 3D and culminating in the Death Eaters' attack. Double Negative also advanced the Death Eaters' smoke effects, with the introduction of the 'flayed man' stage in between their smokey, fluid, flying state and their live-action presence upon landing. Other work included the Patronus charm that interrupts the wedding party to inform the guests that Voldemort has taken over the Ministry of Magic.

The visual-effects company Framestore produced most of the creature CGI, as in previous films, as well as the animated "Tale of the Three Brothers" sequence, which was directed and designed by Ben Hibon.

=== Music ===
Composer Nicholas Hooper, who scored Order of the Phoenix and Half-Blood Prince, did not return for Deathly Hallows. Instead, Alexandre Desplat was hired to compose the score for Harry Potter and the Deathly Hallows – Part 1. The film also featured the song "O Children" by Nick Cave and the Bad Seeds.

== Marketing ==
The first official picture from the first film was released on 1 December 2009, showing Harry, Ron and Hermione in a London street. A clip was officially released on 8 December 2009 with the release of Harry Potter and the Half-Blood Prince on Blu-ray and DVD. At the 2010 ShoWest convention, Alan F. Horn premiered unfinished footage from both films. The 2010 MTV Movie Awards premiered more footage from Deathly Hallows. Following this was the release of the official teaser poster, which shows the release date of both Part 1 and Part 2 and a destroyed Hogwarts castle. ABC Family broadcast interviews and additional scenes from both parts during their Harry Potter weekend, which began on 8 July 2010. A two-minute trailer for the film was released worldwide on 22 September 2010.

On 29 September 2010, three character posters for Part 1 of Harry, Ron, and Hermione were released by Yahoo! Movies. The following day, a Part 1 cinema poster was released featuring the trio on the run in a forest. The theatrical poster has the tagline "Nowhere is safe", and another version with no credits has the tagline "The end begins". Various other character posters for Part 1 were released on 6 October 2010, featuring Harry, Ron, Hermione, Lord Voldemort, Bellatrix Lestrange, Severus Snape and Fenrir Greyback. On 12 October, four new character posters were released. The posters are set to the theme of "Trust no one" and "The hunt begins".

On 15 October 2010, tickets began selling on Fandango for the US release of Part 1, and on 19 October, a 50-second clip featuring never-before-seen footage was aired at the 2010 Scream Awards. On 16 October, the second TV spot was released on Cartoon Network during a premiere of Scooby-Doo! Curse of the Lake Monster. On 25 October 2010, Yahoo! Movies released an exclusive featurette of the film. On 30 October 2010, Entertainment Weekly released two new featurettes titled "Horcruxes" and "The Story", featuring a large amount of never-before-seen footage. On the same day, the Warner Bros. Harry Potter website was updated to reveal twelve miniature clips from the film.

On 3 November 2010, the Los Angeles Times released an extended clip of Harry leaving the Burrow to find the Horcruxes, titled "No One Else Is Going to Die for Me". On 4 November, a new clip was released from the Harry Potter Facebook page, titled "The Seven Potters". Two more clips were released over the next two days, including a scene depicting a café attack and another taking place in Malfoy Manor.

== Release ==
=== Theatrical ===
On 26 August 2010, director David Yates, producers David Heyman and David Barron, and with Warner Bros. president Alan F. Horn attended a test screening for Deathly Hallows – Part 1 in Chicago. The unfinished film gained rave reviews from test screeners, some of whom labelled it "amazing and dark" and "the most perfect Harry Potter film". Others expressed that the film faithfully adapted the novel, which led to an inheritance of the "book's own problems".

Warner Bros. Pictures was originally going to release Part 1 of Deathly Hallows in 2D and 3D formats. On 8 October 2010, it was announced that plans for a 3D version of Part 1 had been scrapped. "Warner Bros. Pictures has made the decision to release Harry Potter and the Deathly Hallows – Part 1 in 2D, in both conventional and IMAX cinemas [because] we will not have a completed 3D version of the film within our release date window. Despite everyone's best efforts, we were unable to convert the film in its entirety and meet the highest standards of quality." Part 1 of Deathly Hallows was released on Blu-ray 3D as a Best Buy Exclusive. Part 2 was still released in 2D, 3D, and IMAX formats.

The world premiere for Deathly Hallows – Part 1 was held in Leicester Square in London on 11 November 2010, with fans from across the world turning up – some of whom had camped for days in the square. This was followed by the Belgian premiere on 12 November and the US premiere in New York City on 15 November.

Just 48 hours prior to the official North American launch of Part 1, the first 36 minutes of the film were leaked on the internet. Even before the leak, the film was already the fifth-biggest generator of advance ticket sales in history, after selling out 1,000 cinemas across the United States. Despite widely circulating rumours that the leaked footage was a marketing ploy to generate hype for the movie release date, no screener discs had been created by Warner Bros., and executives called it "a serious breach of copyright violation and theft of Warner Bros. property".

In Australia, the film had its premiere on 13 November at Warner Bros. Movie World, located on the Gold Coast, Queensland. Three hundred people attended the viewing, which was the second official showing in the world, behind the UK premiere. The film premiered in Kuwait on 16 November. In Israel, Estonia, and New Zealand, the film was released on 18 November.

=== Home media ===
Harry Potter and the Deathly Hallows – Part 1 was released on a single and double disc DVD and 3-disc Blu-ray combo pack on 11 April 2011 in the UK and on 15 April 2011 in the US. On 28 January 2011, it was announced by Emma Watson on the Harry Potter UK Facebook page that the page's fans will get to vote for their preferred cover for the Part 1 Blu-ray. The cover with the most votes will be the cover for the disc. Voting started that same day. The DVD and Blu-ray include eight deleted scenes, with the Blu-ray Combo Pack containing an opening scene from Part 2 featuring Harry and Ollivander discussing the Deathly Hallows. Deathly Hallows – Part 1 performed well in DVD sales, selling 7,237,437 DVD units and adding $86,932,256 to the gross revenue of the film, bringing the total to $1,043,331,967.

== Reception ==
=== Box office ===
Harry Potter and the Deathly Hallows – Part 1 grossed $24 million in North America during its midnight showing, beating the record for the highest midnight gross of the series, previously held by Half Blood Prince, at $22.2 million. The film also had the third-highest midnight gross of all time, behind The Twilight Saga: Eclipse and The Twilight Saga: New Moon, which grossed $30 million and $26.3 million, respectively. The film broke the record for the highest midnight gross in IMAX, with $1.4 million in box office sales, surpassing Eclipse, which grossed $1 million. All of these records were later topped in 2011 by the film's sequel, Harry Potter and the Deathly Hallows – Part 2.

In North America, the film grossed $61.7 million on its opening day, marking the sixth highest single day gross ever at the time. It became the highest opening day for a Harry Potter film in the series, a record previously held by Half-Blood Prince with $58.2 million, until it was broken by Harry Potter and the Deathly Hallows – Part 2 with $92.1 million. The film grossed a total of $125 million in its opening weekend, marking the largest opening for the franchise, previously held by Goblet of Fire and later topped by its sequel Harry Potter and the Deathly Hallows – Part 2. It also was the second biggest November opening ever at the time, behind The Twilight Saga: New Moon's $142.8 million, the ninth biggest weekend opening for a film of all time at the North American box office, and the second biggest opening weekend for a 2010 film in the United States and Canada behind Iron Man 2's $128.1 million. The film stayed at the top of the box office for two weeks, grossing $75 million over the five-day Thanksgiving weekend, bringing its total to $219.1 million.

In the United Kingdom, Ireland, and Malta, the film broke records for the highest Friday gross (£5.9 million), Saturday gross (£6.6 million), and Sunday gross (£5.7 million). Additionally, the film set the largest single day gross (£6.6 million) and the largest opening three-day gross (£18,319,721), a record previously held by Quantum of Solace, which grossed £15.4 million. As of 13 February 2011, Part 1 has grossed £52,404,464 ($86,020,929), becoming the second highest-grossing 2010 release in the country, behind Toy Story 3 (£73,405,113).

Outside North America, the film grossed an estimated $205 million in its opening weekend, becoming the sixth highest of all time, the highest for a 2010 release, and the second highest for a Harry Potter movie, behind only Half-Blood Prince. Globally, the film grossed $330 million in its opening weekend, ranking seventh on the all-time chart.

It was the highest grossing 2010 film in Indonesia ($6,149,448), Singapore ($4,546,240), Thailand ($4,933,136), Belgium and Luxembourg ($8,944,329), France and the Maghreb region ($51,104,397), Germany ($61,430,098), the Netherlands ($13,790,585), Norway ($7,144,020), Sweden ($11,209,387), and Australia ($41,350,865). In total overseas earnings, it surpassed Philosopher's Stone ($657.2 million) to become the highest grossing Harry Potter film overseas.

Part 1 ended its run with $296.4 million in the United States and Canada, making it the fifth-highest-grossing film of 2010 in these regions, and $680.7 million from other countries around the world, for a worldwide total of $977.1 million, making it the third highest-grossing film of 2010 worldwide behind Toy Story 3 and Alice in Wonderland, as well as the third highest grossing Harry Potter film in the series behind The Deathly Hallows – Part 2 and The Philosopher's Stone.

=== Critical response ===
Rotten Tomatoes gives the film an approval rating of 76% based on 289 reviews, with an average rating of 7.1/10. The site's critics consensus reads, "It can't help but feel like the prelude it is, but Deathly Hallows: Part I is a beautifully filmed, emotionally satisfying penultimate installment for the Harry Potter series." On Metacritic, the film has a weighted average score of 65 out of 100, based on 42 critics, indicating "generally favorable reviews". Audiences surveyed by CinemaScore gave the film an average grade of "A" on an A+ to F scale.

The UK's Daily Telegraph also gave the film a positive review, remarking, "For the most part the action romps along, spurred by some impressive special effects," adding, "It's just slightly disappointing that, with the momentum having been established so effectively, we now have to wait until next year to enjoy the rest of the ride." Roger Ebert awarded the first part three out of four stars, praising the cast and calling it "a handsome and sometimes harrowing film . . . completely unintelligible for anyone coming to the series for the first time". Scott Bowles of USA Today called it, "Menacing and meditative, Hallows is arguably the best instalment of the planned eight-film franchise, though audiences who haven't kept up with previous chapters will be hopelessly lost", while Lisa Schwarzbaum of Entertainment Weekly likewise praised the film as "the most cinematically rewarding chapter yet." In a review for the Orlando Sentinel, Roger Moore proclaimed Part I as "Alternately funny and touching, it's the best film in the series, an Empire Strikes Back for these wizards and their wizarding world. And those effects? They're so special you don't notice them." Ramin Setoodeh of Newsweek gave a negative review, writing, "They've taken one of the most enchanting series in contemporary fiction and sucked out all the magic . . . while Rowling's stories are endlessly inventive, Potter onscreen just gives you a headache."

Keith Uhlich of Time Out New York named Harry Potter and the Deathly Hallows – Part 1 the seventh-best film of 2010, calling it an "elatingly downbeat blockbuster".

=== Accolades ===
Harry Potter and the Deathly Hallows – Part 1 was nominated for Best Art Direction and Best Visual Effects at the 83rd Academy Awards. It is the second film in the Harry Potter film series to be nominated for a Visual Effects Oscar (the previous one being Harry Potter and the Prisoner of Azkaban). The film was long-listed for eight different categories, including Best Cinematography, Production Design, and Original Score, at the 64th BAFTA awards, and ultimately was nominated for Best Special Visual Effects and Make-up.

Award	Category	Result	Recipient	Source
83rd Academy Awards	Best Art Direction	Nominated	Stuart Craig; Stephenie McMillan	
83rd Academy Awards	Best Visual Effects	Nominated	Tim Burke; John Richardson; Christian Manz; Nicolas Aithadi	
64th BAFTA Awards	Special Visual Effects	Nominated	Tim Burke; John Richardson; Christian Manz; Nicolas Aithadi	
64th BAFTA Awards	Best Makeup and Hair	Nominated	Amanda Knight; Lisa Tomblin	
BAFTA Britannia Awards	Artistic Excellence in Directing	Won	David Yates (for Harry Potter films 5–8)	
37th Saturn Awards	Best Fantasy Film	Nominated		
37th Saturn Awards	Best Director	Nominated	David Yates	
37th Saturn Awards	Best Special Effects	Nominated	Tim Burke; John Richardson; Nicolas Ait'Hadi; Christian Manz	
37th Saturn Awards	Best Make-Up	Nominated	Mark Coulier; Nick Dudman; Amanda Knight	
37th Saturn Awards	Best Costume	Nominated	Jany Temime	
2011 Hugo Awards	Best Dramatic Presentation (Long Form)	Nominated	David Yates, Steve Kloves	
2011 MTV Movie Awards	Best Movie	Nominated		
2011 MTV Movie Awards	Best Male Performance	Nominated	Daniel Radcliffe	
2011 MTV Movie Awards	Best Female Performance	Nominated	Emma Watson	
2011 MTV Movie Awards	Best Villain	Won	Tom Felton	
2011 MTV Movie Awards	Best Kiss	Nominated	Daniel Radcliffe and Emma Watson	
2011 MTV Movie Awards	Best Fight	Nominated	Daniel Radcliffe, Emma Watson and Rupert Grint	
Satellite Awards 2010	Best Cinematography	Nominated	Eduardo Serra	
Satellite Awards 2010	Best Original Score	Nominated	Alexandre Desplat	
Washington D.C. Area Film Critics Association Awards	Best Art Direction	Nominated	Stuart Craig	
Art Directors Guild Awards 2010	Best Art Direction in a Fantasy Film	Nominated	Stuart Craig	
Golden Reel Awards 2011	Best Sound Editing: Music in a Feature Film	Nominated	Gerard McCann; Peter Clarke; Stuart Morton; Allan Jenkins; Kirsty Whalley; Rob Houston	
Golden Reel Awards 2011	Best Sound Editing: Dialogue and ADR in a Feature Film	Nominated	James Harley Mather; Bjorn Ole Schroeder; Dan Laurie; Jon Olive	
Houston Film Critics Society Awards 2010	Best Cinematography	Nominated	Eduardo Serra	
San Diego Film Critics Society Awards 2010	Best Cinematography	Nominated	Eduardo Serra	
San Diego Film Critics Society Awards 2010	Best Production Design	Nominated	Stuart Craig	
Phoenix Film Critics Society Awards 2010	Best Cinematography	Nominated	Eduardo Serra	
Phoenix Film Critics Society Awards 2010	Best Visual Effects	Nominated		
Visual Effects Society Awards 2011	Outstanding Visual Effects in a Visual-Effects Driven Feature Motion Picture	Nominated	Tim Burke; Emma Norton; John Richardson	
Visual Effects Society Awards 2011	Outstanding Animated Character in a Live Action Feature Motion Picture (Dobby)	Won	Mathieu Vig; Ben Lambert; Laurie Brugger; Marine Poirson	
Visual Effects Society Awards 2011	Outstanding Animated Character in a Live Action Feature Motion Picture (Kreacher)	Nominated	Mathieu Vig; Ben Lambert; Laurie Brugger; Marine Poirson	
Broadcast Film Critics Association Awards 2010	Best Visual Effects	Nominated		
Broadcast Film Critics Association Awards 2010	Best Makeup	Nominated		
St. Louis Gateway Film Critics Association Awards 2010	Best Visual Effects	Nominated		
St. Louis Gateway Film Critics Association Awards 2010	Special Merit (Obliviate Scene)	Nominated		
Las Vegas Film Critics Society Awards	Best Visual Effects	Nominated		
International Film Music Critics Association	Best Original Score for a Fantasy/Science Fiction/Horror Film	Nominated	Alexandre Desplat	
2011 Kids' Choice Awards	Favorite Movie	Nominated		
2011 Kids' Choice Awards	Favorite Movie Actress	Nominated	Emma Watson	
Empire Awards 2011	Best Actress	Nominated	Emma Watson	
Empire Awards 2011	Best Sci-Fi / Fantasy	Won		
2011 National Movie Awards	Best Fantasy Film	Won		
2011 National Movie Awards	Performance of the Year	Nominated	Daniel Radcliffe	
2011 National Movie Awards	Performance of the Year	Nominated	Emma Watson	
2011 National Movie Awards	Performance of the Year	Nominated	Rupert Grint	
2011 Teen Choice Awards	Choice Movie: Sci-Fi/Fantasy	Won		
2011 Teen Choice Awards	Choice Movie: Actor Sci-Fi/Fantasy	Nominated	Daniel Radcliffe	
2011 Teen Choice Awards	Choice Movie: Actress Sci-Fi/Fantasy	Won	Emma Watson	
2011 Teen Choice Awards	Choice Movie: Villain	Won	Tom Felton	
2011 Teen Choice Awards	Choice Movie: Liplock	Won	Daniel Radcliffe and Emma Watson	
2011 British Academy Children's Awards (BAFTA)	Favorite Film	Nominated		
2011 British Academy Children's Awards (BAFTA)	BAFTA Kids' Vote (Film Category)	Nominated		

== Sequel ==
Deathly Hallows – Part 1 was followed in July 2011 by Part 2, the final instalment of the Harry Potter film series. Its story concludes Potter's quest to find and destroy Voldemort's Horcruxes in order to stop him once and for all. Part 2 was a financial success, becoming the highest-grossing film of 2011 and the franchise, and was generally well received by critics.

== See also ==
- List of films about witchcraft
- List of films split into multiple parts
