= Gregorowicz =

Gregorowicz is a Polish surname. It is a patronymic surname, literally "son of Gregor". It has archaic feminine forms, still used colloquially: Gregorowiczowa (by husband), Gregorowiczówna (by father). Outside Poland it may also be spelled as Gregorovitz. It may also be phonetically respelled as Gregorovich. Notable people with the surname include:

- Lucas Gregorowicz (born 1976), German-Polish actor

== See also ==
- Grigorovich
