= Grigori Trilogy =

The Grigori Trilogy is a series of three gothic horror novels by British author Storm Constantine. The series tells the story of the Grigori, a race of fallen angels who are being rewoken in preparation for the new millennium, and their children by human women, the Nephilim.

Constantine draws upon a wide-ranging bibliography of references for her novels. Elements of John Milton's Paradise Lost, Lord Byron's Heaven and Earth and the writings of paranormal author Andrew Collins can be found throughout the series.

Originally published in the United Kingdom by Signet/Penguin, the books were later published by U.S. publisher Meisha Merlin. In 2006, the first book in the series was brought back into print by UK-based Immanion Press. The remaining two books will follow.

== Books ==
- Stalking Tender Prey (1995)
- Scenting Hallowed Blood (1996)
- Stealing Sacred Fire (1997)
