= 2012 Fife Council election =

2012 Scottish local government election

- 3 May 2012

All 78 seats to Fife Council 40 seats needed for a majority
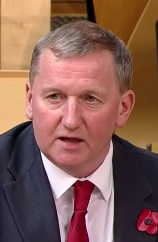

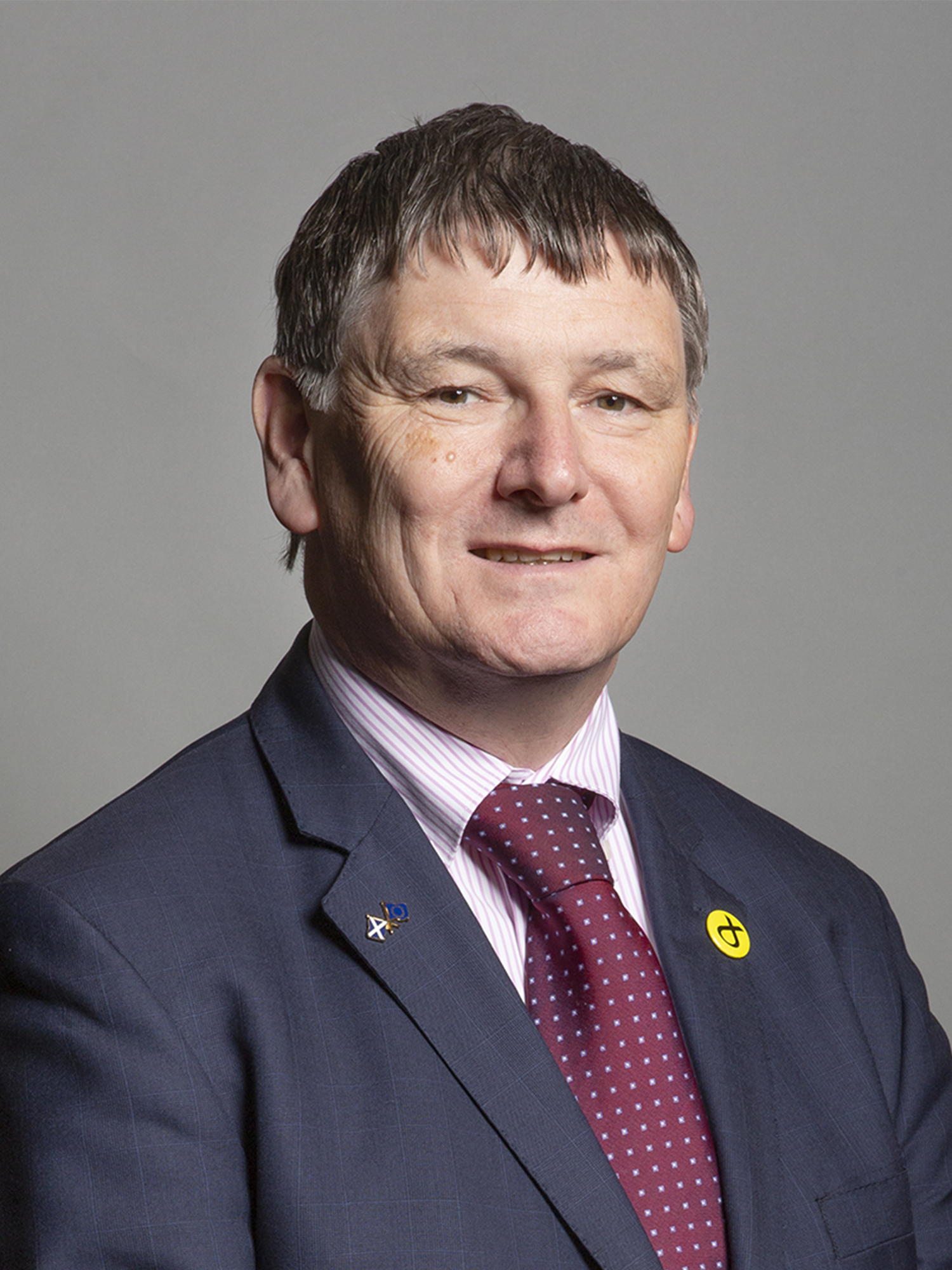
	First party	Second party	Third party
Leader	Alex Rowley	Peter Grant	Elizabeth Riches
Party	Labour	SNP	Liberal Democrats
Leader's seat	The Lochs	Glenrothes West and Kinglassie	East Neuk and Largoward
Last election	24 seats, 30.8%	23 seats, 29.5%	21 seats, 26.9%
Seats before	24	22	21
Seats won	35	26	10
Seat change	▲11	▲3	▼11
Popular vote	41,126	33,205	13,983
Percentage	38.5%	31.1%	13.1%
	Fourth party	Fifth party
Leader	Andrew Rodger	Dave Dempsey
Party	Independent	Conservative
Leader's seat	Buckhaven, Methil and Wemyss Villages	Inverkeithing and Dalgety Bay
Last election	5 seats, 6.4%	5 seats, 6.4%
Seats before	6	4
Seats won	4	3
Seat change	▼1	▼2
Popular vote	6,356	8,382
Percentage	5.9%	7.8%
- 2012 Fife Council Election Results Map
Council Leader before election
Peter Grant
SNP
Council Leader after election
Alex Rowley
Labour

Elections to Fife Council were held on 3 May 2012, the same day as the other Scottish local government elections. The election used the 23 wards created as a result of the Local Governance (Scotland) Act 2004, with each ward electing three or four Councillors using the single transferable vote system form of proportional representation, with 78 Councillors elected.

The biggest benefactors were the Labour Party who regained the 11 seats they had lost in the 2007 Local Elections thus increase its share to remain the largest party. Scottish Liberal Democrats lost over half their seats, with labour picking up most of the seats, while the Scottish National Party increased their representation by 3 seats and remained in second place on the authority. Most of their gains were in the wards of the Fife North East constituency where they had previously only had a single seat. The Independents lost a seat while the Scottish Conservative and Unionist Party lost 2 seats. The UK Independence Party lost its only Scottish Councillor who had defected from the Conservatives in 2008.

Following the election the Labour Party formed a minority administration with the support of the Independents and the Conservative Party. This replaced the previous SNP - Lib Dem coalition administration.

== Election results ==
Fife local election result 2012
Party	Seats	Gains	Losses	Net gain/loss	Seats %	Votes %	Votes	+/−
Labour	35	11	0	11	44.87	38.5	41,122	+9.8
SNP	26	4	1	3	33.33	31.1	33,205	+3.3
Liberal Democrats	10	0	11	-11	12.82	13.1	14,015	-9.3
Independent	4	0	1	-1	5.13	6.2	6,582	-1.4
Conservative	3	1	3	-2	3.85	7.8	8,382	-3.2
Scottish Senior Citizens	0	-	-	-	-	1.4	1,466	New
Green	0	-	-	-	-	1.0	1,030	-0.4
UKIP	0	-	-	-	-	0.9	986	+0.4
Monster Raving Loony	0	-	-	-	-	0.1	67	New

Note: "Votes" are the first preference votes. The net gain/loss and percentage changes relate to the result of the previous Scottish local elections on 3 May 2007. This may differ from other published sources showing gain/loss relative to seats held at dissolution of Scotland's councils.

== Ward results ==
Obelisks (†) indicate changes since the election, and link to further details.

=== West Fife and Coastal Villages ===
- 2007: 1xLab; 1xLib Dem; 1xSNP; 1xIndependent
- 2012: 2xLab; 1xSNP; 1xIndependent
- 2007-2012 Change: Lab gain one seat from Lib Dem

West Fife and Coastal Villages - 4 seats
Party	Candidate	FPv%	Count							
Party	Candidate	FPv%	1	2	3	4	5	6	7	8
Labour	Bobby Clelland (incumbent)	30.65	1,933							
SNP	Kate Stewart	15.73	992	1,020.8	1,035.8	1,055.3	1,077.8	1,597.3		
Labour	Alice Callaghan	14.11	890	1,420.1						
Independent	William Ferguson (incumbent)	11.46	723	749.4	771.6	810.1	956.8	975.2	1,053.8	1,394.8
Liberal Democrats	Gerry McMullan (incumbent)	9.59	605	618.5	631.1	646.2	859.5	871.6	916	
SNP	Len Woods	8.77	553	565.8	569.7	576.2	590.1			
Conservative	Bruce Holborn	8.01	505	511.9	516.6	531.1				
Scottish Senior Citizens	Charlie Ross	1.68	106	114.7	128.2					
Electorate: 14,331 Valid: 6,307 Spoilt: 81 Quota: 863 Turnout: 6,385 (44.01%)

=== Dunfermline North ===
- 2007: 1xLib Dem; 1xLab; 1xSNP
- 2012: 2xLab; 1xSNP
- 2007-2012 Change: Lab gain one seat from Lib Dem

Dunfermline North - 3 seats
Party	Candidate	FPv%	Count			
Party	Candidate	FPv%	1	2	3	4
SNP	David Mogg (incumbent) †^{11}	31.55	1,204			
Labour	Helen Law	26.13	997			
Labour	William Campbell	23.17	884	913.3	949.4	988.2
Liberal Democrats	James Calder	13.57	518	570.9	572.8	722.3
Conservative	Graeme Whyte	6.63	253	269.9	270.7	
Electorate: 10,162 Valid: 3,816 Spoilt: 54 Quota: 955 Turnout: 3,862 (37.55%)

=== Dunfermline Central ===
- 2007: 2xLib Dem; 1xLab; 1xSNP
- 2012: 2xLab; 1xLib Dem; 1xSNP
- 2007-2012 Change: Lab gain one seat from Lib Dem

Dunfermline Central - 4 seats
Party	Candidate	FPv%	Count						
Party	Candidate	FPv%	1	2	3	4	5	6	7
Labour	Jim Leishman	27.96	1,608						
Liberal Democrats	Joe Rosiejak (incumbent)	17.88	1,028	1,072.3	1,243.2				
SNP	Neale Hanvey	17.32	996	1,019.9	1,032.2	1,037.9	1,110.2	1,117.5	1,626.1
Labour	Bob Young	12.99	747	1,038.3	1,070.9	1,087.9	1,216.8		
SNP	Lizz Mogg (incumbent)	9.2	529	557.4	570.9	582.2	641.2	648.2	
Independent	Jim Gallagher	7.34	422	445.3	541.3	564.8			
Conservative	David Ross	7.32	421	431.2					
Electorate: 14,864 Valid: 5,751 Spoilt: 64 Quota: 1,151 Turnout: 5,815 (38.69%)

=== Dunfermline South ===
- 2007: 2xLib Dem; 1xSNP; 1xLab
- 2012: 2xLab; 1xLib Dem; 1xSNP
- 2007-2012 Change: Lab gain one seat from Lib Dem

Dunfermline South - 4 seats
Party	Candidate	FPv%	Count						
Party	Candidate	FPv%	1	2	3	4	5	6	7
Labour	Mike Rumney (incumbent) †^{02}	22.02	1,271						
Labour	Cara Hilton †^{07}	20.69	1,194						
Liberal Democrats	Tony Martin (incumbent)	20.62	1,190						
SNP	Brian Goodall (incumbent)	17.54	1,012	1,025.4	1,029.4	1,034.7	1,081.1	1,144.5	1,681.1
SNP	Fay Sinclair	9.15	528	540.3	544.6	548.4	584.9	609.2	
Conservative	Margaret Reid Fairgrieve	6.41	370	374.9	377.4	385.3	420.8		
Green	Angela Dixon	3.57	206	220.7	227.7	232.8			
Electorate: 15,927 Valid: 5,771 Spoilt: 64 Quota: 1,155 Turnout: 5,829 (36.60%)

=== Rosyth ===
- 2007: 1xSNP; 1xLab; 1xLib Dem
- 2012: 2xLab; 1xSNP
- 2007-2012: Lab gain one seat from Lib Dem

Rosyth - 3 seats
Party	Candidate	FPv%	Count						
Party	Candidate	FPv%	1	2	3	4	5	6	7
SNP	Douglas Chapman (incumbent) †^{10}	27.84	1,076						
Labour	Pat Callaghan (incumbent)	27.14	1,049						
Labour	Mike Shirkie	20.54	794	798.1	865	881.6	896.5	930.9	1,044.9
SNP	Simon Tate	7.92	306	396.5	398.2	404.6	415.3	433.2	510.3
Liberal Democrats	Audrey Dunsmore	7.12	275	279.2	283.1	287.1	305.3	411.4	
Conservative	Ian Dempsey	5.77	223	224.8	225.9	227.9	260.9		
UKIP	Alastair MacIntyre	2.61	101	103.2	104.6	110.6			
Independent	Jason McGilvray	1.06	41	41.9	42.7				
Electorate: 10,875 Valid: 3,865 Spoilt: 54 Quota: 967 Turnout: 3,924 (35.54%)

=== Inverkeithing and Dalgety Bay ===
- 2007: 1xSNP; 1xLab; 1xLib Dem; 1xCon
- 2012: 2xLab; 1xSNP; 1xCon
- 2007-2012 Change: Lab gain one seat from Lib Dem

Inverkeithing and Dalgety Bay - 4 seats
Party	Candidate	FPv%	Count					
Party	Candidate	FPv%	1	2	3	4	5	6
SNP	Alice McGarry (incumbent)	25.56	1,377					
Labour	Lesley Laird	17.82	960	978.7	991.1	1,060.5	1,061.6	1,197.8
Labour	Gavin Yates	16.28	877	888.7	899.2	1,025.2	1,026.3	1,241.3
Conservative	Dave Dempsey (incumbent)	15.44	832	843.1	930.7	1,085.2		
SNP	Helen Todd	12.29	662	891.5	918.6	1,000.8	1,001.8	
Liberal Democrats	Dave Walker *	9.23	497	506.3	522.6			
UKIP	Mike Arthur	3.38	182	185.5				
Electorate: 13,311 Valid: 5,387 Spoilt: 54 Quota: 1,078 Turnout: 5,441 (40.47%)

- = Outgoing Councillor from a different Ward.

=== The Lochs ===
- 2007: 1xIndependent; 1xLab; 1xSNP
- 2012: 1xLab; 1xIndependent; 1xSNP
- 2007-2012 Change: No change

The Lochs - 3 seats
Party	Candidate	FPv%	Count					
Party	Candidate	FPv%	1	2	3	4	5	6
Labour	Alex Rowley (incumbent) †^{03}	37.04	1,380					
Independent	William L. Clarke (incumbent) †^{12}	27.51	1,025					
SNP	Ann Bain (incumbent)	19.0	708	754.7	769.6	783.5	868.6	1,036.1
Labour	Caron Hughes	9.37	349	621.4	669.5	682.3	734.6	
Independent	Susan Archibald	4.43	165	214.7	221.7	265.9		
Conservative	Sheila Emmerson	2.66	99	104.5	105.8			
Electorate: 9,968 Valid: 3,726 Spoilt: 55 Quota: 932 Turnout: 3,781 (37.38%)

=== Cowdenbeath ===
- 2007: 1xLab; 1xIndependent; 1xSNP
- 2012: 2xLab; 1xSNP
- 2007-2012 Change: Lab gain one seat from Independent

Cowdenbeath - 3 seats
Party	Candidate	FPv%	Count	
Party	Candidate	FPv%	1	2
Labour	Peter Lockhart	35.32	1,309	
Labour	Jayne Baxter †^{04}	30.14	1,117	
SNP	Alistair Bain (incumbent)	24.15	895	959.2
SNP	Darren Tod	4.86	180	197.5
Conservative	Alistair Harvey	3.40	126	142.9
Liberal Democrats	Elaine Walker	2.13	79	114
Electorate: 10,742 Valid: 3,706 Spoilt: 61 Quota: 927 Turnout: 3,767 (34.50%)

=== Lochgelly and Cardenden ===
- 2007: 2xLab; 1xSNP
- 2012: 2xLab; 1xSNP
- 2007-2012 Change: No change

Lochgelly and Cardenden - 3 seats
Party	Candidate	FPv%	Count				
Party	Candidate	FPv%	1	2	3	4	5
Labour	Linda Erskine	35.07	1,210				
Labour	Mark Hood (incumbent)	31.94	1,102				
SNP	Ian Chisholm (incumbent)	20.84	719	763.4	794.9	814.8	1,130.9
SNP	Andrew Lonie	8.67	299	344.9	375.7	406	
Conservative	James Reekie	3.48	120	143.8	159.2		
Electorate: 9,826 Valid: 3,450 Spoilt: 81 Quota: 863 Turnout: 3,531 (35.11%)

=== Burntisland, Kinghorn and Western Kirkcaldy ===
- 2007: 1xSNP; 1xLab; 1xLib Dem
- 2012: 1xLab; 1xSNP; 1xLib Dem
- 2007-2012 Change: No change

Burntisland, Kinghorn and Western Kirkcaldy - 3 seats
Party	Candidate	FPv%	Count								
Party	Candidate	FPv%	1	2	3	4	5	6	7	8	9
Labour	Peter George	27.85	1,331								
SNP	George Kay (incumbent)	25.44	1,216								
Liberal Democrats	Susan Leslie (incumbent)	15.46	739	746.6	748.7	758.7	782.1	830.8	954.2	1,043.4	1,207.5
Labour	Richard Perry	9.83	470	573.4	574.4	583.9	607.1	636.6	657.7	749.7	
SNP	Sally Walsh	7.89	377	380.9	395.2	406.5	421.6	446.9	464.1		
Conservative	Norman Morrison	5.31	254	255.3	255.6	261.7	274.9	334.4			
UKIP	Peter Adams	4.46	213	215.3	215.7	220.7	246.9				
Scottish Senior Citizens	Anne Whyte	2.36	113	116.5	116.9	132.1					
Monster Raving Loony	Louche Lord Lancaster	1.40	67	68.5	68.9						
Electorate: 11,474 Valid: 4,780 Spoilt: 40 Quota: 1,196 Turnout: 4,820 (41.66%)

=== Kirkcaldy North ===
- 2007: 2xLab; 1xSNP
- 2012: 2xLab; 1xSNP
- 2007-2012 Change: No change

Kirkcaldy North - 3 seats
Party	Candidate	FPv%	Count						
Party	Candidate	FPv%	1	2	3	4	5	6	7
Labour	Neil Crooks (incumbent)	39.38	1,739						
Labour	David Ross (incumbent)	19.11	844	1,339.8					
SNP	Carol Lindsay (incumbent)	18.03	796	829.5	855.5	880.9	890.6	938.7	1,507.6
SNP	Randall Foggie	12.55	554	588.6	607.9	617.4	626.1	676.7	
Scottish Senior Citizens	Janette Hamilton	4.87	215	242.3	292.1	322.5	407.6		
Conservative	Mark Hamid	3.71	164	168.4	174.2	201.9			
Liberal Democrats	John Mainland	2.36	104	111.7	133.6				
Electorate: 11,935 Valid: 4,416 Spoilt: 82 Quota: 1,105 Turnout: 4,498 (37.0%)

=== Kirkcaldy Central ===
- 2007: 1xSNP; 1xLab; 1xLib Dem
- 2012: 2xLab; 1xSNP
- 2007-2012 Change: Lab gain one seat from Lib Dem

Kirkcaldy Central - 3 seats
Party	Candidate	FPv%	Count				
Party	Candidate	FPv%	1	2	3	4	5
Labour	Judy Hamilton (incumbent)	36.55	1,534				
SNP	Stuart Macphail	20.75	871	906.3	922.9	1,340.9	
Labour	Kenny Selbie	13.70	575	948.2	988.3	1,016.1	1,084.3
SNP	Iain Wallace	11.65	489	496.6	510.9		
Liberal Democrats	Alice Soper (incumbent)	10.08	423	440.4	566.6	592.9	
Conservative	Dorothy Ross	7.27	305	313.5			
Electorate: 11,565 Valid: 4,197 Spoilt: 65 Quota: 1,050 Turnout: 4,262 (36.29%)

=== Kirkcaldy East ===
- 2007: 2xLab; 1xSNP
- 2012: 2xLab; 1xSNP
- 2007-2012 Change: No change

Kirkcaldy East
Party	Candidate	FPv%	Count						
Party	Candidate	FPv%	1	2	3	4	5	6	7
Labour	Lawrence Brown (incumbent)	29.90	1,111						
Labour	Kay Carrington (incumbent) †^{14}	20.05	745	900.9	926.1	963.3			
SNP	Arthur Morrison †^{05}	19.97	742	746.7	763.1	790.2	795.2	838.6	1,409.6
SNP	Frank Wallace	16.42	610	613.1	620.3	651.4	654.3	675.5	
Conservative	Edgar Cook	6.03	224	226.4	251.8	295.9	299.1		
Scottish Senior Citizens	Mike Parker	4.84	180	182.1	195.3				
Liberal Democrats	Callum Leslie	2.80	104	106.1					
Electorate: 10,749 Valid: 3,716 Spoilt: 60 Quota: 930 Turnout: 3,776 (34.57%)

=== Glenrothes West and Kinglassie ===
- 2007: 2xSNP; 2xLab
- 2012: 2xSNP; 2xLab
- 2007-2012 Change: No change

Glenrothes West and Kinglassie - 4 seats
Party	Candidate	FPv%	Count							
Party	Candidate	FPv%	1	2	3	4	5	6	7	8
Labour	Betty Campbell (incumbent) †^{06}	27.49	1,424							
SNP	Peter Grant (incumbent) †^{09}	18.17	941	948.9	958.2	959.2	966.5	975.5	1,018.8	1,263.2
SNP	Bill Brown †^{08}	17.57	910	921.9	931.2	932.5	945.7	956	972.4	1,064.7
Labour	Altany Craig	13.67	708	1,034.9	1,051.5					
SNP	Craig Walker	6.74	349	350.4	351.4	351.6	353.9	356.9	368.9	
Scottish Senior Citizens	Claire Dawson	5.23	271	283.2	291.8	294.5	310.1	371	478.1	488.6
Independent	Robert James Taylor	3.71	192	196.3	202.3	203.2	290.5	318.8		
Conservative	Patricia Irvine	2.99	155	156.9	169.2	169.5	170.8			
Independent	Ian Robertson	2.84	147	149.9	158.3	159.3				
Liberal Democrats	Cathy Adamson	1.60	83	85.2						
Electorate: 13,711 Valid: 5,180 Spoilt: 75 Quota: 1,037 Turnout: 5,255 (37.78%)

=== Glenrothes North, Leslie and Markinch ===
- 2007: 2xSNP; 2xLab
- 2012: 2xSNP; 2xLab
- 2007-2012 Change: No change

Glenrothes North, Leslie and Markinch - 4 seats
Party	Candidate	FPv%	Count						
Party	Candidate	FPv%	1	2	3	4	5	6	7
Labour	William Kay (incumbent) †^{01}	23.48	1,253						
SNP	Fiona Grant (incumbent)	22.35	1,193						
SNP	John Beare (incumbent)	17.73	946	949.8	1,021.6	1,024	1,031.2	1,060.5	1,106.7
Labour	Kay Morrison (incumbent)	17.43	930	1,090.8					
SNP	Steven Marwick	7.44	397	399.1	430.9	432.1	437.5	465.3	496.2
Conservative	Allan David Stewart Smith	5.81	310	312.8	315.5	316.8	344.8	411.8	
Scottish Senior Citizens	Jim Parker	4.23	226	231.6	238	243	265.8		
Liberal Democrats	Michael Steel	1.54	82	83.9	84.9	86.5			
Electorate: 14,278 Valid: 5,337 Spoilt: 57 Quota: 1,068 Turnout: 5,394 (37.38%)

=== Glenrothes Central and Thornton ===
- 2007: 2xSNP; 1xLab
- 2012: 2xLab; 1xSNP
- 2007-2012 Change: Lab gain one seat from SNP

Glenrothes Central and Thornton - 3 seats
Party	Candidate	FPv%	Count						
Party	Candidate	FPv%	1	2	3	4	5	6	7
SNP	Ross Vettraino (incumbent)	29.66	1,197						
Labour	Ian Crichton (incumbent)	26.04	1,051						
Labour	Ian Sloane	20.64	833	847.5	881.7	897.1	928.1	1,008.7	1,203.6
SNP	Vikki Wilton	14.17	572	728.1	729.4	736.7	759.3	799.5	
Scottish Senior Citizens	Jim Benvie	4.22	172	177.5	179.1	192.5	245.7		
Conservative	Brian Mills	3.87	156	157.4	157.8	168.9			
Liberal Democrats	Jane Kerr	1.36	55	55.8	56.3				
Electorate: 10,797 Valid: 4,036 Spoilt: 76 Quota: 1,010 Turnout: 4,112 (37.38%)

=== Howe of Fife and Tay Coast ===
- 2007: 2xLib Dem; 1xSNP
- 2012: 1xLib Dem; 1xSNP; 1xCon
- 2007-2012 Change: Con gain one seat from Lib Dem

Howe of Fife and Tay Coast - 3 seats
Party	Candidate	FPv%	Count						
Party	Candidate	FPv%	1	2	3	4	5	6	7
Liberal Democrats	Donald Lothian (incumbent)	28.75	1,367						
SNP	David MacDiarmid (incumbent)	24.37	1,159	1,175	1,203.7				
Conservative	Andy Heer	16.38	779	795	866.8	867.2	896.1	960.2	1,148.7
Labour	Iain Miles	10.79	513	521.9	575.6	576.3	626.5	787.1	
Green	Neil Stoddart	8.14	387	396.4	461.6	462.3	579.7		
SNP	Colin Reid	7.13	339	341.3	361.2	372.6			
Liberal Democrats	Harry Wills	4.44	211	323.4					
Electorate: 11,781 Valid: 4,755 Spoilt: 56 Quota: 1,189 Turnout: 4,811 (40.36%)

=== Tay Bridgehead ===
- 2007: 2xLib Dem; 1xCon
- 2012: 2xLib Dem; 1xSNP
- 2007-2012 Change: SNP gain one seat from Con

Tay Bridgehead - 3 seats
Party	Candidate	FPv%	Count			
Party	Candidate	FPv%	1	2	3	4
SNP	Bill Connor	25.41	1,214			
Liberal Democrats	Tim Brett (incumbent)	24.74	1,182	1,185.3	1,369.4	
Liberal Democrats	Margaret Taylor (incumbent)	20.80	994	997.1	1,146.3	1,287.3
Labour	Jane O'Neill	16.70	798	802.8	870.2	886.9
Conservative	Andrew MacQueen	12.35	590	591.1		
Electorate: 10,959 Valid: 4,778 Spoilt: 17 Quota: 1,195 Turnout: 4,795 (43.60%)

=== St. Andrews ===
- 2007: 3xLib Dem; 1xCon
- 2012: 1xCon; 1xSNP; 1xLib Dem; 1xLab
- 2007-2012 Change: SNP and Lab each gain one seat from Lib Dem

St. Andrews - 4 seats
Party	Candidate	FPv%	Count							
Party	Candidate	FPv%	1	2	3	4	5	6	7	8
Conservative	Dorothea Morrison (incumbent)	17.43	769	796	820	843	889			
SNP	Keith McCartney	15.64	690	706	725	806	838	867.1	867.4	979.3
Liberal Democrats	Frances Melville (incumbent)	14.53	641	665	772	858	1,189			
Labour	Brian Thomson	13.60	600	629	647	742	776	828.8	829.2	951.2
Green	Benjamin Bridgman	9.91	437	453	464					
Independent	Murdo MacDonald	8.37	369	453	475	534	569	624.3	626.1	
Liberal Democrats	Robin Waterston (incumbent)	7.96	351	381	466	518				
Liberal Democrats	Bill Sangster (incumbent)	6.76	298	311						
Independent	Henry Paul	5.80	256							
Electorate: 14,331 Valid: 4,411 Spoilt: 32 Quota: 883 Turnout: 4,443 (30.78%)

=== East Neuk and Landward ===
- 2007: 2xLib Dem; 1xCon
- 2012: 2xLib Dem; 1xSNP
- 2007-2012 Change: SNP gain one seat from UKIP

East Neuk and Landward - 3 seats
Party	Candidate	FPv%	Count					
Party	Candidate	FPv%	1	2	3	4	5	6
Liberal Democrats	Elizabeth Riches (incumbent)	26.94	1,066					
SNP	John Docherty	24.36	964	970.5	1,068.3			
Liberal Democrats	Donald MacGregor (incumbent)	13.29	526	576.8	678.2	699.4	825.2	1,098.1
Conservative	Tom Waterton-Smith	13.70	542	545.3	561.4	566.4	735.8	
UKIP	Mike Scott-Hayward (incumbent)	11.27	446	452.4	504.6	518.5		
Labour	Mary Cairns	10.44	413	416.4				
Electorate: 10,249 Valid: 3,957 Spoilt: 22 Quota: 990 Turnout: 3,979 (38.61%)

=== Cupar ===
- 2007: 1xLib Dem; 1xIndependent; 1xCon
- 2012: 1xIndependent; 1xLib Dem; 1xSNP
- 2007-2012 Change: SNP gain one seat from Con

Cupar - 3 seats
Party	Candidate	FPv%	Count				
Party	Candidate	FPv%	1	2	3	4	5
Independent	Bryan Poole (incumbent)	34.52	1,556				
Liberal Democrats	Margaret Kennedy (incumbent)	21.19	955	1,110.5	1,255.4		
SNP	Karen Marjoram	19.92	898	972.9	1,084.2	1,117.8	1,318.9
Conservative	Roger Guy (incumbent)	16.04	723	801.3	836.2	883.8	
Labour	Freida Loughlan	8.32	375	431.2			
Electorate: 11,170 Valid: 4,507 Spoilt: 36 Quota: 1,127 Turnout: 4,543 (40.35%)

=== Leven, Kennoway and Largo ===
- 2007: 2xSNP; 1xLab; 1xLib Dem
- 2012: 2xLab; 2xSNP
- 2007-2012 Change: Lab gain one seat from Lib Dem

Leven, Kennoway and Largo - 4 seats
Party	Candidate	FPv%	Count							
Party	Candidate	FPv%	1	2	3	4	5	6	7	8
SNP	David Alexander (incumbent)	23.40	1,383							
Labour	Charles Haffey (incumbent)	19.08	1,128	1,136.5	1,150.5	1,170.7	1,254.1			
Labour	Tom Adams	16.21	958	963.6	967.2	990.4	1,056.1	1,115.3	1,123.3	1,287.7
SNP	Alistair Hunter (incumbent) †^{13}	12.59	744	856.9	1,149.1	1,177.3	1,239.7			
Liberal Democrats	Christopher Trotter	9.96	589	592.3	602.5	747	843.6	846.1	851.8	
Scottish Senior Citizens	Joe Cochrane	6.92	409	417.9	427.1	503.8				
Conservative	Dave Mole	6.80	402	404.3	407.3					
SNP	Alistair Suttie	5.04	298	347.7						
Electorate: 14,903 Valid: 5,911 Spoilt: 36 Quota: 1,183 Turnout: 6,006 (40.30%)

=== Buckhaven, Methil and Wemyss Villages ===
- 2007: 2xLab; 1xIndependent; 1xSNP
- 2012: 2xLab; 1xIndependent; 1xSNP
- 2007-2012 Change: No change

Buckhaven, Methil and Wemyss Villages - 4 seats
Party	Candidate	FPv%	Count								
Party	Candidate	FPv%	1	2	3	4	5	6	7	8	9
Labour	David Graham	28.2	1,430								
Independent	Andrew Rodger (incumbent)	25.79	1,307								
SNP	John O'Brien	16.38	830	859.7	902	902.9	907.1	915.2	915.6	967.3	1,394.5
Labour	Jim Young (incumbent)	14.45	732	1,024.6							
SNP	Arthur Robertson (incumbent)	9.67	490	499.3	532.3	533	534	538.2	544	565.9	
Independent	Ricky Jannetta	3.02	153	178	253.6	255	261.3	276.6	300.3		
Conservative	Keith Stanley Smith	1.18	60	61.2	65.9	65.9	69.8	76.6			
UKIP	Kris Seunarine	0.87	44	46.3	54.2	54.4	57.2				
Liberal Democrats	Lois Lothian	0.41	21	23.3	26.9	27.2					
Electorate: 14,114 Valid: 5,067 Spoilt: 36 Quota: 1,014 Turnout: 5,160 (35.90%)

== Changes since the election ==
Date	Ward	Loss	Gain	Note
May 2013	Glenrothes North, Leslie and Markinch	Labour		William Kay dies.
20 June 2013	Glenrothes North, Leslie and Markinch		Labour	By-election: seat held by John Wincott.
26 July 2013	Dunfermline South	Labour		Mike Rumney dies.
24 October 2013	Dunfermline South		Labour	By-election: seat held by Billy Pollock.
23 January 2014	The Lochs	Labour		Alex Rowley wins a by-election to the Scottish Parliament for the Cowdenbeath constituency.
April 2014	Cowdenbeath	Labour		Jayne Baxter resigns her seat upon being appointed a list MSP in April 2014.
22 May 2014	The Lochs		Labour	By-election: seat held by Alex Campbell.
22 May 2014	Cowdenbeath		Labour	By-election: seat held by Gary Guichan.
31 October 2014	Kircaldy East	SNP		Arthur Morrison resigns due to poor attendance.
22 January 2015	Kircaldy East		SNP	By-election: seat held by Marie Penman.
22 January 2015	Glenrothes West and Kinglassie	Labour		Betty Campbell dies suddenly.
Feb 2015	Dunfermline South	Labour		Cara Hilton resigns her seat having been elected an MSP for the Dunfermline constituency on 24 October 2013.
26 March 2015	Glenrothes West and Kinglassie		SNP	By-election: seat won by Craig Walker.
7 May 2015	Dunfermline South		SNP	By-election: seat won by Fay Sinclair.
25 May 2015	Glenrothes West and Kinglassie	SNP	Independent	Bill Brown resigns from the SNP for personal reasons.
3 July 2015	Glenrothes West and Kinglassie	SNP		Peter Grant resigns his seat having been elected MP for Glenrothes on 7 May 2015.
September 2015	Dunfermline North	SNP		David Mogg resigns his seat.
28 September 2015	Rosyth	SNP		Douglas Chapman resigns his seat having been elected as MP for Dunfermline and West Fife.
1 October 2015	Glenrothes West and Kinglassie		SNP	By-election: seat held by Julie Ford.
26 November 2015	Rosyth		SNP	By-election: seat held by Sharon Wilson.
26 November 2015	Dunfermline North		SNP	By-election: sea held by Ian Ferguson.
14 March 2016	Kircaldy East	SNP	Independent	Marie Penman resigns, accusing the SNP of ignoring her claims of bullying and harassment.
1 June 2016	The Lochs	Independent		William L. Clarke, the UK's only elected communist, announces his resignation.
25 August 2016	The Lochs		Labour	By-election: seat won by Mary Bain Lockhart.
20 October 2016	Leven, Kennoway and Largo	SNP		Alistair Hunter resigns his seat as he and his family are emigrating to Australia.
19 November 2016	Kircaldy East	Labour		Kay Carrington dies after a battle with cancer.
15 December 2016	Leven, Kennoway and Largo		SNP	By-election: seat held by Alistair Suttie.

=== By-elections ===
The detailed results of the 12 by-elections are as follows:

Glenrothes North, Leslie and Markinch by-election (20 June 2013) - 1 seat
Party	Candidate	FPv%	Count			
Party	Candidate	FPv%	1	2	3	4
Labour	John Wincott	45.8	1,896	1,927	1,966	2,095
SNP	Keith Grieve	41.3	1,711	1,724	1,761	1,814
Conservative	Allan David Stewart Smith	6.6	272	287	335	
UKIP	Peter Taggerty	4.3	176	184		
Liberal Democrats	Harry Wills	2.0	83			
Electorate: 14,252 Valid: 4,138 Spoilt: 25 Quota: 2,070 Turnout: 4,163 (29.21%)

Dunfermline South by-election (24 October 2013) - 1 seat
Party	Candidate	FPv%	Count					
Party	Candidate	FPv%	1	2	3	4	5	6
Labour	Billy Pollock	39.7	2,552	2,568	2,618	2,697	3,170	4,086
SNP	Helen Cannon-Todd	32.0	2,057	2,075	2,112	2,142	2,358	
Liberal Democrats	Robin Munro	15.7	1,009	1,029	1,073	1,257		
Conservative	David Ross	7.0	450	497	504			
Green	Angela Dixon	2.8	183	201				
UKIP	Judith Rideout	2.8	183					
Valid: 6,434 Quota: 3,217

The Lochs by-election (22 May 2014) - 1 seat
Party	Candidate	FPv%	Count
Party	Candidate	FPv%	1
Labour	Alex Campbell	65.9	2,042
SNP	Lesley Backhouse	24.3	753
UKIP	Martin Green	5.2	162
Conservative	Jonathan Gray	4.6	141
Electorate: 10,424 Valid: 3,098 Spoilt: 52 Quota: 1,550 Turnout: 3,150 (30.22%)

Cowdenbeath by-election (22 May 2014) - 1 seat
Party	Candidate	FPv%	Count
Party	Candidate	FPv%	1
Labour	Gary Guichan	61.5	2,039
SNP	Connor Watt	25.2	834
UKIP	Judith Rideout	8.4	277
Conservative	John Wheatley	4.9	164
Valid: 3,314 Turnout: 29.67%

Kirkcaldy East by-election (22 January 2015) - 1 seat
Party	Candidate	FPv%	Count					
Party	Candidate	FPv%	1	2	3	4	5	6
SNP	Marie Penman	47.33	1,460	1,464	1,466	1,472	1,484	1,553
Labour	Liz Easton	35.27	1,088	1,088	1,091	1,097	1,120	1,148
Conservative	Edgar Cook	7.23	223	224	225	231	266	274
Green	Claire Reid	4.08	126	129	132	138	150	
UKIP	Peter Adams	3.79	117	117	120	123		
Liberal Democrats	Callum Leslie	1.30	40	40	41			
Independent	Ronald Hunter	0.62	19	21				
Independent	Alastair MacIntyre	0.39	12					
Electorate: 10,924 Valid: 3,085 Spoilt: 41 Quota: 1,543 Turnout: 3,126 (27.27%)

Glenrothes West and Kinglassie by-election (26 March 2015) - 1 seat
Party	Candidate	FPv%	Count
Party	Candidate	FPv%	1
SNP	Craig Walker	55.3	2,539
Labour	Alan Seath	35.8	1,643
Conservative	John Wheatley	4.4	202
UKIP	Martin Green	3.2	146
Liberal Democrats	Jane Ann Liston	1.3	61
Valid: 4,591 Turnout: 32.59

Dunfermline South by-election (7 May 2015) - 1 seat
Party	Candidate	FPv%	Count
Party	Candidate	FPv%	1
SNP	Fay Sinclair	51.52	5,899
Labour	Andrew Verrecchia	27.82	3,185
Conservative	David Ross	11.56	1,324
Liberal Democrats	James Calder	9.09	1,041
Electorate: 17,031 Valid: 11,449 Spoilt: 132 Quota: 5,725 Turnout: 11,581 (67.8%)

Glenrothes West and Kinglassie by-election (1 October 2015) - 1 seat
Party	Candidate	FPv%	Count
Party	Candidate	FPv%	1
SNP	Julie Ford	58.99%	2,235
Labour	Alan Seath	31.86%	1,207
Conservative	Jonathan Gray	6.18%	234
Green	Lorna Ross	2.98%	113
Electorate: 13,910 Valid: 3,789 Quota: 1,895 Turnout: 27.1%

Dunfermline North by-election (26 November 2015) - 1 seat
Party	Candidate	FPv%	Count					
Party	Candidate	FPv%	1	2	3	4	5	6
SNP	Ian Ferguson	43.5%	1,056	1,062	1,083	1,122	1,144	1,337
Labour	Joe Long	29.6%	719	722	733	805	912	
Conservative	James Reekie	12.5%	304	319	321	389		
Liberal Democrats	James Calder	9.5%	230	235	253			
Green	Lewis Campbell	2.6%	63	72				
UKIP	Chloanne Dodds	2.4%	58					
Electorate: 10,166 Valid: 2,430 Spoilt: 20 Quota: 1,216 Turnout: 2,450 (24.06%)

Rosyth by-election (26 November 2015) - 1 seat
Party	Candidate	FPv%	Count						
Party	Candidate	FPv%	1	2	3	4	5	6	7
SNP	Sharon Wilson	45.2%	1,214	1,235	1,241	1,249	1,263	1,286	1,623
Labour	Vikki Fairweather	34.5%	926	939	950	966	1,012	1,117	
Conservative	David Ross	9.1%	245	246	256	281	309		
Liberal Democrats	Matthew Hall	3.6%	97	102	112	122			
UKIP	Colin Mitchelson	3.3%	88	90	97				
Independent	Alastair MacIntyre	2.5%	66	68					
Green	Cairinne MacDonald	1.9%	51						
Electorate: 10,985 Valid: 2,687 Spoilt: 22 Quota: 1,344 Turnout: 2,709 (24.66%)

The Lochs by-election (25 August 2016) - 1 seat
Party	Candidate	FPv%	Count			
Party	Candidate	FPv%	1	2	3	4
Labour	Mary Bain Lockhart	47.1%	1,318	1,329	1,365	1,459
SNP	Lea McLelland	38.6%	1,079	1,091	1,106	1,124
Conservative	Malcolm McDonald	9.6%	270	275	280	
Communist	Thomas Kirby	3.1%	86	89		
Green	Bradford Oliver	1.6%	45			
Valid: 2,798 Turnout: 27.8%

Leven, Kennoway and Largo by-election (15 December 2016) - 1 seat
Party	Candidate	FPv%	Count				
Party	Candidate	FPv%	1	2	3	4	5
SNP	Alistair Suttie	36.95%	1,501	1,532	1,615	1,668	2,214
Labour	Colin Davidson	28.43%	1,155	1,169	1,302	1,620	
Conservative	Graham Ritchie	18.51%	752	754	954		
Liberal Democrats	Steve Wood	14.28%	580	590			
Green	Iain Morrice	1.82%	74				
Valid: 4,062 Spoilt: 28 Quota: 2,032 Turnout: 4,090 (27.6%)
