= Provost of Fife =

- Incumbent; Jim Leishman since April 2012
- Appointer: Elected
- Formation: 1150
- Deputy: Julie Ford
- Website: fife.gov.uk

The Provost of Fife is the ceremonial head of Fife Council, a Scottish unitary authority covering the historic county of Fife. Along with the duties of an ordinary councillor, it is the Provost's duty to promote the values of the council, provide an example to others and enhance the reputation of the council and Fife.

The Provost is elected every five years by the members of the Council. The title was reinstated in May 2004. The current Provost is Councillor Jim Leishman who was elected for a third term as Provost in 2022.

Elected	Provost	Deputy	Notes
May 2022	Jim Leishman		
May 2017	Jim Leishman	Julie Ford	Leishman was the first ever Provost of Fife to be re-elected.
May 2012	Jim Leishman	Kay Morrison	
May 2007	Frances Melville	Lizz Mogg (Dec 2007)	Melville was the first woman to be Provost of Fife.
May 2004	John Simpson		

== See also ==
- Lord Lieutenant of Fife
