= Hryhoriy =

Hryhoriy (Ukrainian: Григорій [ɦrɪˈɦɔr⁽ʲ⁾ij]), sometimes Hryhorii or Hryhory is a Ukrainian male given name. "Hryhory" may also be a Belarusian male given name. Notable people with the name include:

- Hryhory Alchevsky (1866–1920), prominent Ukrainian and minor Russian composer
- Hryhoriy Baranets (born 1986), professional Ukrainian football midfielder
- Hryhory Bazhul (1906–1989), Ukrainian bandurist
- Hryhoriy Chernysh, candidate in the 2004 Ukrainian presidential election
- Hryhoriy Chorny (died 1630), a Hetman of the Dnieper Cossacks from 1628 to 1630
- Hryhoriy Hamarnik or Grigory Gamarnik (born 1929), former Soviet world champion wrestler
- Hryhoriy Hrynko (1890–1938), Soviet Ukrainian statesman who held high office in the government of the Soviet Union
- Hryhoriy Hulyanytsky (died 1679), Ukrainian Cossack colonel, a skilled warrior and a shrewd politician
- Hryhoriy Illyashov (born 1965), former KGB operative, Ukrainian spy, and politician
- Hryhoriy Khomyshyn, Ukrainian Greek Catholic bishop and martyr
- Hryhoriy Kvitka-Osnovyanenko (1778–1843), Ukrainian writer, journalist, and playwright
- Hryhoriy Kytastyi (1907–1984), Ukrainian émigré composer and conductor
- Hryhoriy Loboda (born 1596), Kosh Otaman of the Zaporizhian Host (1593–6, with interruptions) of Romanian descent
- Hryhory Nazarenko (1902–1997), bandura player
- Hryhoriy Nemyria, Chairman of the Human Rights Committee of the Verkhovna Rada
- Hryhory Pekarski, Belarusian swimmer
- Hryhorii Pereghinyak (1910-1943), Ukrainian nationalism and war criminal
- Hryhoriy Petrovskiy (1878–1958), one of the most prominent Russian revolutionaries of Ukrainian origin
- Hryhoriy Piatachenko (1932–2022), Ukrainian economist and politician
- Hryhoriy Sakhnyuk (born 1987), professional and international Ukrainian football defender
- Hryhorii Skovoroda (1722–1794), Ukrainian and Russian philosopher, poet, teacher and composer
- Hryhoriy Surkis (born 1949), Ukrainian businessman and politician, vice-president of UEFA
- Hryhory Vasylivsky (d. 1921), Ukrainian revolutionary
- Hryhoriy Veryovka (1895–1964), Ukrainian composer, choir director, and teacher
- Hryhoriy Yarmash (born 1985), Ukrainian football defender

== See also ==
- Gregory (given name)
- Grigory, Russian variant
- Krikor, Western Armenian variant
- Ryhor, Belarusian variant
