= Jim Leishman =

Scottish Labour Party politician (b.1953)

Jim Leishman MBE
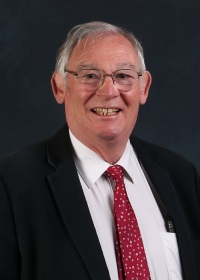

Provost of Fife
- In office June 2012 – present

Councillor, Fife Council
- In office 3 May 2012 – present
- Constituency: Dunfermline Central

Personal details
- Born: 15 November 1953 (age 72) Lochgelly, Fife, Scotland
- Party: Scottish Labour
- Occupation: Retired
- Profession: Football
- Website: Fife Council's Website
Association football career
- Position: Defender
Team information
- Current team: Dunfermline Athletic (Director)
Senior career*
Years	Team	Apps	(Gls)
1970–1977	Dunfermline Athletic	67	(4)
1977	Cowdenbeath	11	(0)
Managerial career
- 1980–1981: Kelty Hearts
- 1982–1990: Dunfermline Athletic
- 1991: Inverness Thistle
- 1992–1993: Montrose
- 1993–1994: Rosyth Recreation
- 1995: Meadowbank Thistle
- 1995–1997: Livingston
- 2000–2003: Livingston
- 2005–2006: Dunfermline Athletic
- * Club domestic league appearances and goals

Jim Leishman MBE (born 15 November 1953) is a Scottish Labour Party politician and former professional football player and manager. He is currently Provost of Fife and an honorary director of Scottish Championship side Dunfermline Athletic.

== Career ==
=== Player ===
Leishman played for Dunfermline between 1970 and 1977 before being transferred to local rivals Cowdenbeath. When his playing career was cut short through injury, he moved into coaching and then management with Kelty Hearts Junior Football Club, before becoming youth team coach and later reserve team coach at Dunfermline.

=== Manager ===
Leishman was appointed manager of the Pars, aged just 28, in 1982. The club were bottom of the Second Division, the third tier of Scottish football. The Pars finished third in 1984–85, missing out on promotion on the final day of the season. Leishman and assistant manager Gregor Abel then forged a side that won successive promotions to the Scottish Premier Division, winning the Second Division in 1985–86 and finishing second to Greenock Morton in the 1986–87 First Division.

After an unsuccessful campaign in the Premier Division in 1987/88, Leishman again led the club to promotion from the First to Premier Division in the 1988/89 season. Throughout this time, Leishman had helped rebuild the fanbase of the club. With publicity campaigns ranging from talks at local primary schools to national television appearances, Leishman arrested the downward spiral of the club since the early 1970s. The average gate of the club increased from approximately 1,500 in 1983/84 to 7,500 in season 1987/88.

In 1989/90, Leishman's final year of his first tenure as the Pars' boss – the average home gate of Dunfermline Athletic Football Club was 13,500; the third largest in Scotland and the largest of all provincial clubs in the country. In this time, he brought players such as George O'Boyle and record-signing István Kozma to the club. He kept the club in the Premier Division at the end of the season. At the end of the campaign though, it was suggested that Leishman move from the dugout to the board-room with the club's suggestion that he take up the role of general manager. Leishman resisted the offer and left his post acrimoniously in July 1990. The move shocked the Pars' support and 4,000 fans marched on the club demanding his reinstatement as manager.

Following his departure from the Pars in 1990, he had unproductive spells with Montrose and Inverness Thistle, and a spell in charge of Fife Junior outfit Rosyth Recreation. In March 1995, he joined Edinburgh side Meadowbank Thistle, who were facing relegation from the Second Division. Leishman was unable to prevent the drop to the Third Division, and the team was subsequently relocated to Livingston, also taking on the name of the town. He enjoyed eight years with Livingston as manager, director of football and manager once more. There he succeeded in taking Livingston into the Scottish Premier League for the first time, also qualifying for the UEFA Cup by finishing third in their first season following promotion to the top flight.

In August 2003, he returned to Dunfermline as general manager. Following the sacking of Davie Hay with just three matches of the 2004–05 remaining, Leishman prevented relegation by steering the club to crucial wins over their main relegation rivals Dundee and Dundee United. Dunfermline had failed to win in their previous ten matches under Hay, but in Leishman's temporary care they beat Dundee, 5–0 and he took the job on a full-time basis.

In 2005–06 an 11th-placed finish, although level on points with Falkirk and Dundee United, was enough to preserve their premier league membership. A low in this season came near the end of February when Celtic visited East End Park and won 8–1. Exactly one month later, Dunfermline faced Celtic in the 2006 Scottish League Cup final and despite an improved performance, they lost 3–0.

Pressure on Leishman increased steadily in 2006/07 after another poor start which brought just three wins in two months. On 26 October 2006, Leishman decided to return to his post as general manager, with former Hearts boss Craig Levein the initial favourite to take over. Leishman had himself recommended Levein and Livingston manager John Robertson as candidates, and Levein moved to Dundee United following the sacking of Craig Brewster on 29 October 2006. Former Derry City boss, Stephen Kenny, took over in November 2006.

=== Politician ===
After retiring from football, Leishman took up politics. He was elected as a Scottish Labour councillor for the Dunfermline Central ward of Fife Council at the 2012 election, and was subsequently appointed Provost of Fife.

== Personal life ==
In the 2007 Birthday Honours, Leishman was appointed as a Member of the Order of the British Empire (MBE) "for services to sport." Leishman was further honoured in February 2008 by having a street in Dunfermline named after him.

== Honours ==
Dunfermline

- Scottish Second Division
  - Winners (1): 1985–86
- Scottish First Division
  - Winners (1): 1988–89

Livingston

- Scottish First Division
  - Winners (1): 2000–01
- Scottish Third Division
  - Winners (1): 1995–96
- SPL Manager of the Month (2): September 2001, November 2001

=== Personal honours ===
Jim was awarded a Great Scot Award in 2010, and in the same year, was given a Lifetime Achievement award from Radio Forth.

Again, in 2010, he received a fellow of the college award from Carnegie College at Dunfermline Abbey.

In 2012, Jim was elected as a councillor on the Friday, then was made The Provost of Fife the following Thursday.

=== Managerial statistics ===
As of 4 December 2012

Team	Nat	From	To	Record				
Team	Nat	From	To	G	W	D	L	Win %
Kelty Hearts	(Scotland)	1980	1981					
Dunfermline Athletic	(Scotland)	October 1983	May 1990					
Inverness Thistle	(Scotland)	1991	1991					
Montrose	(Scotland)	1992	1993					
Rosyth Recreation	(Scotland)	1993	1994					
Meadowbank Thistle	(Scotland)	24 March 1995	31 May 1995	8	3	1	4	37.50
Livingston	(Scotland)	1 June 1995	31 May 1997	125	60	35	30	48.00
Livingston	(Scotland)	18 March 2000	30 June 2003	145	68	29	48	46.90
Dunfermline Athletic	(Scotland)	May 2005	Oct 2006	60	16	12	32	26.67

- Leishman's second spell at Livingston was as co-manager alongside David Hay.
