= Gregor Fink =

Slovenian football goalkeeper

Personal information
- Date of birth: 3 July 1984 (age 42)
- Place of birth: Celje, SFR Yugoslavia
- Height: 1.88 m (6 ft 2 in)
- Position: Goalkeeper

Team information
- Current team: USV Wies
- Number: 1

Senior career*
Years	Team	Apps	(Gls)
2000–2004	Dravinja	22	(0)
2003	→ Bistrica (loan)	2	(0)
2004–2007	Celje	5	(0)
2004–2005	→ Dravinja (loan)	33	(0)
2006–2007	→ Dravinja (loan)	24	(0)
2008	Olimpija Ljubljana	2	(0)
2009	Dravinja	17	(0)
2010	Drava Ptuj	14	(0)
2010–2011	Celje	0	(0)
2011–2012	Rudar Velenje	14	(0)
2012–2014	Zavrč	58	(0)
2014–2015	Aris Limassol	16	(0)
2015–2019	Deutschlandsberger SC	88	(0)
2019–2021	Dravinja	36	(0)
2022–	USV Wies	23	(0)

International career
2004	Slovenia U20	1	(0)
2006	Slovenia U21	2	(0)
- * Club domestic league appearances and goals as of 18 October 2023

Gregor Fink (born 3 July 1984) is a Slovenian footballer who plays as a goalkeeper for Austrian team USV Wies.
