= Grigori Galitsin =

Russian former erotic photographer

Grigori Aleksandrovich Galitsin (Russian: Григо́рий Алекса́ндрович Гали́цын, romanized: Grigórij Aleksándrovič Galicyn; 1957 – 13 November 2021), also known as A. Obolenski, was a Russian erotic photographer.

== Biography ==
=== Career ===
Galitsin studied classical painting in Leningrad, but later turned to photography. His first camera, an early Leica model, was given to him by his grandfather who purchased it from the German army in 1947.

In 1996, Galitsin, who by then had established himself primarily as an erotic photographer based in Volgograd, began providing content to an early Internet adult website. In 1998, he became the main content provider for the newly founded adult website, Most Erotic Teens (the predecessor of MET-ART), and also provided content for another adult site, DOMAI. In 2002, he left MET and launched the website Galitsin-Archives as a joint project with Norwegian photographer Petter Hegre. After a falling-out with Hegre in 2004, Galitsin ended Galitsin-Archives and established his own website Galitsin-News. Galitsin also started the sister website Nud-Art in 2006.

The majority of Galitsin's photos and videos were shot in the Volgograd area, and sometimes in hotels in Moscow as well. Galitsin's apartment (the former home of poet Margarita Agashina and former Volgograd mayor Yuri Chekov) doubled as a high-tech porn studio. His activity as a pornographer was largely unknown to his neighbors, though he was noted around Volgograd for his expensive lifestyle.

Occasionally he would travel abroad with his models to countries like Egypt and India to shoot on location there. In 2006, Galitsin filmed and photographed several models at some beach resorts and Ayurvedic massage parlours in Varkala and Papanasam, India. Indian police later became aware of the resulting videos, which had been posted on Galitsin-News, and conducted raids on a number of Varkala massage parlours on suspicion of illegal activity.

=== Arrest ===
On September 17, 2006, Galitsin and his wife Irina Aleksandrovna Pischasova (who was also one of his models, appearing under the name "Valentina") were arrested in Volgograd, accused of violating Russian Criminal Code Article 133 ("Coercion [through blackmail] to commit a sexual act") and Article 242.1 ("Manufacturing and dissemination of materials or objects containing pornographic images of minors"). On October 26, he petitioned the Russian president Vladimir Putin and asked for intervention on his behalf. According to a second letter to Putin drafted in May 2007, Galitsin was still in custody awaiting trial. Pischasova was also once again taken into custody in March. Galitsin and his wife were released from prison in early 2009, though Galitsin continued to face further charges.

As of October 2014, Galitsin, Irina, and their two children had relocated to Kalachyovsky District, where he invested his life savings in an "experimental farm". Here, Galitsin bred and raised rare breed pigs and chickens, notably Mangalica pigs. He was no longer active in professional photography, other than as documentation of his farming operation and family life.

== Books ==
- Galitsin's Angels: From Russia with Love. Munich: Edition Reuss. 2005. ISBN 3-934020-34-8.
