= Gregor Hasler =

Swiss psychotherapist and psychiatrist

Gregor Hasler is a Swiss psychiatry researcher, psychiatrist and psychotherapist. He is professor and chair of psychiatry and psychotherapy at the University of Fribourg in Switzerland. His research areas covers stress, depression, bipolar disorders, and eating disorders.

His most frequently cited findings include:

- Discovery of an association between short sleep duration and obesity (published in 2004)
- Demonstration of GABA, glutamate, and glutamine abnormalities in depression
- Elucidation of the role of dopamine and norepinephrine in bulimia nervosa
- Discovery of markedly reduced metabotropic glutamate receptor 5 in smokers and ex-smokers

== Life ==
Hasler studied medicine at Zurich University, Switzerland. His residency included trainings in internal medicine, metabolic and eating disorders, and psychiatry at university hospitals in Zurich, London, and Paris. He received his medical degree in 1995. He was trained in psychiatric epidemiology by Jules Angst, M.D. In 2002, he became fellow of the Swiss Medical Federation (FMH, Specialist Accrediting Board of Switzerland). From 2003 to 2006 he was a visiting research fellow at the Mood and Anxiety Disorders Program at the National Institute of Mental Health. He conducted a series of studies on biomarkers in mood, anxiety and eating disorders, as well as smoking (GABA, glutamate systems, catecholamines).

In 2010 onwards, he was appointed as professor of psychiatry at the University of Bern, Switzerland, where he was the head of the section on molecular psychiatry. In 2016, he was visiting professor at the Icahn School of Medicine at Mount Sinai, New York. In 2019, he became professor and chair of psychiatry and psychotherapy at the University of Fribourg.

== Awards and honours ==
His work has been honored by various international awards, including the United States’ NARSAD Independent Investigator Award and the Robert Bing Award of the Swiss Academy of Medical Sciences.

== Bibliography ==
He is author of a book on resiliency and on the gut-brain-connection, both published in German (“Resilienz: Der Wir-Faktor”, Schattauer-Verlag, "Die Darm-Hirn-Connection: Revolutionäres Wissen für unsere psychische und körperliche Gesundheit", Schattauer-Verlag).

== Academic memberships ==
- Full member of the American College of Neuropsychopharmacology.
- President of the Swiss Society for Bipolar Disorders and as chapter leader of the International Society for Bipolar Disorders.
- Scientific advisor of the German Federal Ministry of Education and Research.
- Secretary of the Section of Pharmacotherapy of the World Psychiatric Association
- Member of the Scientific Advisory Panel, European College of Neuropsychopharmacology
