= Ryhor =

Ryhor (Belarusian: Рыгор) is a Belarusian-language countepart of the Russian masculine given name Grigory (Gregory). Often the Russian given name is transliterated in Belarusian as Hryhor/Hryhory.

Notable people with the surname include:

- Ryhor Baradulin, Belarusian poet
- Ryhor Kastusioŭ, Belarusian politician
- Ryhor Reles (1913–2004), Belarusian Jewish writer

== See also ==
- Hryhoriy, Ukrainian counterpart
- Krikor, Western Armenian variant
