= Gregor Abel =

Scottish footballer and manager

Personal information
- Date of birth: 9 April 1949 (age 77)
- Position: Defender

Youth career
- Bo'ness United

Senior career*
Years	Team	Apps	(Gls)
1969–1972	Falkirk	70	(0)
1972–1980	Clydebank	235	(0)
1980–1981	Alloa Athletic	25	(0)
Total		330	(0)

Managerial career
- 1983–1984: Falkirk
- 1987–1990: Alloa Athletic
- * Club domestic league appearances and goals

Gregor Abel (born 9 April 1949) is a Scottish former football player and manager. Abel played for Falkirk, Clydebank and Alloa Athletic.

After retiring as a player, he became a coach at Alloa Athletic and then Falkirk, assisting Alex Totten. Abel was appointed Falkirk manager in November 1983, after Totten left the club to become assistant manager of Rangers. He resigned in February 1984 due to the pressures of combining that job with working as a schoolteacher. Abel assisted Jim Leishman as Dunfermline Athletic rose from the Scottish Second Division to the Scottish Premier Division with successive promotions in 1985–86 and 1986–87. Abel left Dunfermline in July 1987 after the club converted to fully professional status, however, because he wanted to retain part-time status and continue his teaching career.

After leaving Dunfermline, Abel became assistant manager of Forfar Athletic. Later that year, Abel was appointed manager of Alloa Athletic. The club won a promotion under his management and reached the quarter-finals of the 1988–89 Scottish Cup. Abel was sacked by Alloa Athletic in February 1990 as the club struggled in the Scottish First Division, having won promotion the season before.

Abel then worked as a reserve team and youth coach for Aberdeen for eight years. He then had five years with Rangers as a youth coach. He continued to teach at Alva Academy until his retirement in 2006.
