= Gregor Cvijič =

Slovenian handball player

Personal information
- Nationality: Slovenian
- Born: 26 March 1972 (age 53) Ljubljana, Yugoslavia

Sport
- Sport: Handball

Gregor Cvijič (born 26 March 1972) is a Slovenian handball player. He competed in the men's tournament at the 2000 Summer Olympics.
