= Grigori Zozulya =

Russian artist (1893–1973)

Grigori Stepanovich Zozulya (Russian: Григорий Степанович Зозуля; 1893–1973) was a Russian artist. He was born in Kyiv, Ukraine, and studied at Stroganov College from 1907 until 1918. From there he studied in the Moscow studios of Alexander Rodchenko from 1919 to 1922, and with Dimitri Kardovski from 1925 to 1926. He was primarily active in Moscow, where he began exhibiting in 1916. In 1929, he became a member of Bytie, and became most well known as a theater artist, while he also worked in graphic arts and exhibition design through the 1930s. During the 1940s and 1950s, his focus moved towards interior design. He died in Palanga, Lithuania.
