= Gregor George =

- Born: William Gregor George c.13th October, 1903 Bright, Victoria
- Died: prior to 22 March 1932 Wentworth Falls, New South Wales
- Height: 5 ft 9 in (175 cm)
- Weight: Medium wight
- School: Sydney Grammar School
- Notable relative(s): Father:William Gregor George. Mother Janet Wilson McGregor George.5 Younger Brothers>Kenneth, Ronald, Terence, Neil, Douglas
- Occupation: Motor Mechanic

Rugby union career
- Position: fly-half
International career
Years	Team	Apps	(Points)
1923–28	Wallabies	12	(2)

William Gregor George (13 October 1903 – 21 March 1932) was a rugby union player who represented Australia.

George, a fly-half, was born in Sydney and claimed a total of 12 international rugby caps for Australia.

== Legacy ==
The Gregor George Shield and Cup were named in his honour.
