= Grigory =

Grigory, Grigori or Grigoriy (Russian: Григорий) is a Russian masculine given names. It is the Russian version of the given name Gregory.

== Grigory ==
- Grigory Baklanov (1923–2009), Russian novelist
- Grigory Barenblatt (1927–2018), Russian mathematician
- Grigory Bey-Bienko (1903–1971), Russian entomologist
- Grigory Danilevsky (1829–1890), Russian novelist
- Grigory Falko (born 1987), Russian swimmer
- Grigory Fedotov (1916–1957), Soviet football player and manager
- Grigory Frid (1915–2012), Russian composer
- Grigory Gagarin (1810–1893), Russian painter and military commander
- Grigory Gamarnik (1929–2018), Soviet wrestler
- Grigory Gamburtsev (1903–1955), Soviet seismologist
- Grigory Ges (1916–1968), Soviet Air Force officer
- Grigory Ginzburg (1904–1961), Russian pianist
- Grigory Grum-Grshimailo (1860–1936), Russian entomologist
- Grigory Gurkin (1870–1937), Altay landscape painter
- Grigory Helbach (1863–1930), Russian chess master
- Grigory Kaminsky (1894–1938), Soviet politician
- Grigory Kiriyenko (born 1965), Russian fencer
- Grigory Korolev (born 2006), Russian nationalist and gaming influencer
- Grigory Kotoshikhin (c. 1630–1667), Russian diplomat and writer
- Grigory Kotovsky (1881–1925), Soviet military commander
- Grigory Kriss (born 1940), Soviet épée fencer
- Grigory Kulik (1890–1950), Soviet military commander
- Grigory Laguta (born 1984), Russian-born Latvian motorcycle speedway rider
- Grigory Landsberg (1890–1957), Soviet physicist
- Grigory Langsdorff (1774–1852), German-Russian naturalist and explorer
- Grigory Leps (born 1962), Russian singer and songwriter of Georgian origin
- Grigory Levenfish (1889–1961), Soviet chess Grandmaster
- Grigory Mairanovsky (1899–1964), Soviet biochemist and poison developer
- Grigory Margulis (born 1946), Russian mathematician
- Grigory Misutin (born 1970), Ukrainian artistic gymnast
- Grigory Nelyubov (1934–1966), Russian cosmonaut
- Grigory Neujmin (1886–1946), Russian astronomer
- Grigory Novak (1919–1980), Soviet Ukrainian weightlifter
- Grigory Okhay (1917–2002), Soviet fighter pilot
- Grigory Ordzhonikidze (1886–1937), Georgian communist
- Grigory Grigoryevich Orlov (1734–1783), Russian military commander and diplomat, lover of Catherine the Great
- Grigory Ostrovsky (1756–1814), Russian painter
- Grigory Petrovsky (1878–1958), Soviet Ukraininan communist and revolutionary
- Grigory Petrovich Nikulin (1895–1965), Soviet revolutionary
- Grigory Pirogov (1885–1931), Russian bass opera singer
- Grigory Pomerants (1918–2013), Russian philosopher and cultural theorist
- Grigory Potanin (1835–1920), Russian orientalist and explorer
- Grigory Potemkin (1739–1791), Russian military leader, statesman, favorite of Catherine the Great
- Grigory Pulov (1918–2005), Soviet air force officer
- Grigory Razumovsky (1759–1837), Ukrainian biologist, geologist and philosopher
- Grigory Romodanovsky (died 1682), Russian military commander and diplomat
- Grigory Romanov (1923–2008), Soviet politician
- Grigory Mikhaylovich Semyonov (1890–1946), Russian military commander
- Grigory Abramovich Shajn (1892–1956), Soviet Russian astronomer
- Grigory Shelikhov (1747–1795), Russian seafarer and merchant
- Grigory Skariatin (1808–1849), Russian Major general
- Grigory or Gregory Skovoroda (1722–1794), Ukrainian philosopher, poet, teacher and composer
- Grigory Sokolov (born 1950), Russian pianist
- Grigory Soroka (1823–1864), Russian painter
- Grigory Sukochev (born 1988), Australian volleyball player
- Grigory Spiridov (1713–1790), Russian admiral
- Grigory Ugryumov (1764–1823), Russian painter
- Grigory Yavlinsky (born 1952), Russian economist and politician
- Grigory Zinoviev (1883–1936), Soviet politician

== Grigori ==
- Grigori, a term used to refer to beings in the Fifth Heaven in the Second Book of Enoch
- Grigori Chukhrai (1921–2001), Russian screenwriter and director
- Grigori Galitsin (born 1957), Russian erotic photographer and porn director
- Grigori Kozintsev (1905–1973), Soviet Russian film director
- Grigori Kromanov (1926–1984), Estonian theatre and film director
- Grigori Ivanovitch Langsdorff or Georg von Langsdorff (1774–1852), Prussian aristocrat, politician and naturalist
- Grigori Marchenko (born 1946), Honorary Consul of the Singaporean government to the Kazakh government
- Grigori Panteleimonov (1885–1934), Russian sports shooter
- Grigori Perelman (born 1966), Russian mathematician
- Grigori Rasputin (1869–1916), a Russian mystic
- Grigori Voitinsky (1893–1956), Comintern official
- Grigori Zozulya (1893–1973), Russian artist

== Grigoriy ==
- Grigoriy Andreyev (born 1976), Russian marathon runner
- Grigoriy Dobrygin (born 1986), Russian actor
- Grigoriy Gruzinsky (1833–1899), Georgian prince
- Grigoriy Myasoyedov (1834–1911), Russian painter
- Grigoriy Mihaylovich Naginskiy (born 1958), Russian politician
- Grigoriy Oparin (born 1997), Russian chess Grandmaster
- Grigoriy Oster (born 1947), Russian author and screenwriter
- Grigoriy Plaskov (1898–1972), Soviet artillery lieutenant
- Grigoriy Tarasevich (born 1995), Russian swimmer
- Grigoriy Yablonsky (born 1940), Soviet-born American chemical engineer and professor
- Grigoriy Yegorov (born 1967), Kazakhstani former pole vaulter

== Fictional characters ==
- Father Grigori, in the computer game Half-Life 2
- Grigori Rasputin (Hellboy), a comic book character
- Grigori Daratrazanoff, a main Carpathian character in Christine Feehan's Dark series
- Grigori, the name of the titular dragon in the computer game Dragon's Dogma
- Grigori Panteleevich Melekhov, in And Quiet Flows the Don
- Octopus Grigori, an aggressive octopus in Gravity's Rainbow
- Grigori Weaver, a Russian Special Agent, part of the CIA in Call of Duty: Black Ops

== See also ==
- Daniel Grigori, an angel in Lauren Kate's Fallen novel series
- Gregory (given name)
- Hryhoriy
- Krikor, Western Armenian variant
- Ryhor, Belarusian variant
