= Gregor Clemens =

German fashion designer

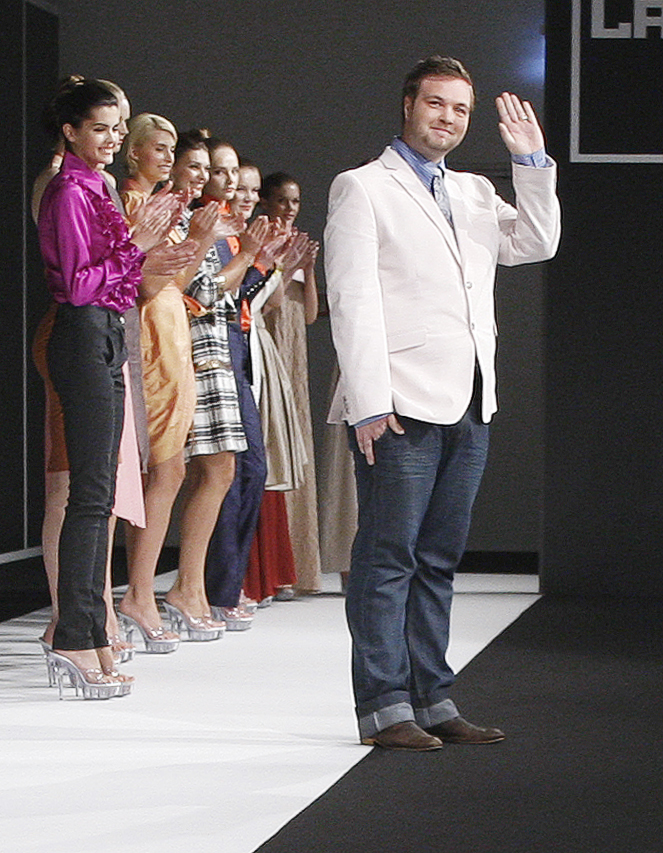
Gregor Clemens, 2009 at the end of his fashion show for the German fashion label Lac et Mel at the Berlin Ellington Hotel. In the background are some models.

Gregor Clemens (born 26 June 1982 in Leipzig, Germany) is a fashion designer and head of design at Lac et Mel.

Clemens grew up as the son of information technology specialist Eberhard Clemens and his wife Sylvia Clemens.

After finishing grammar school in 2002, he lived for one year in London to improve his English and study fashion. He founded the fashion label Lac et Mel in Leipzig in 2004, and later moved to Berlin in 2008. The label moved again in 2009 from Germany to south London.

Clemens' collections have been shown at the Mercedes-Benz Fashion Week in Berlin. In March 2010 Clemens started his own brand under his name with a new collection.
