= Gregor Brandmüller =

Swiss painter

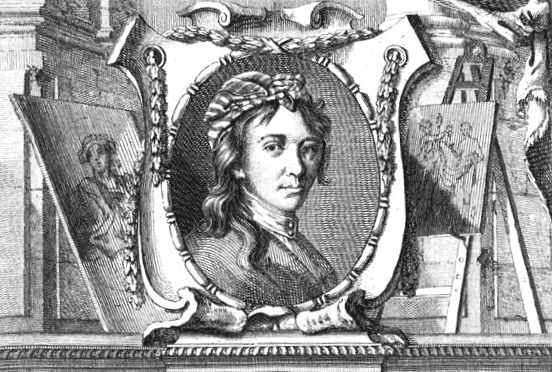
Gregoire Brandmuller in Volume IV of Jean-Baptiste Descamps' "La Vie des Peintres..."

Gregor Brandmüller (or Georg) was a late 17th-century Swiss painter, a pupil of Charles Le Brun.

== Life ==
Brandmüller was born at Basle in 1661, the son of a member of the council. His father owned a collection of drawings and prints, and Brandmüller showed an early interest in art by copying some of them. He was placed under the tuition of an obscure painter called Gaspar Meyer. When he was seventeen he was sent to Paris, where he studied under Charles Le Brun, who thought highly enough of his abilities to employ him to paint from his designs, in the works he was then engaged in at Versailles.

On his return to Switzerland he was invited to the Court of Würtemberg, where he met with great encouragement. He was equal to the composition of grand historical subjects, which he treated with nobleness, and painted with great spirit and fire. One of his most notable works is a Descent from the Cross, in the church of the Capuchins at Dornach.

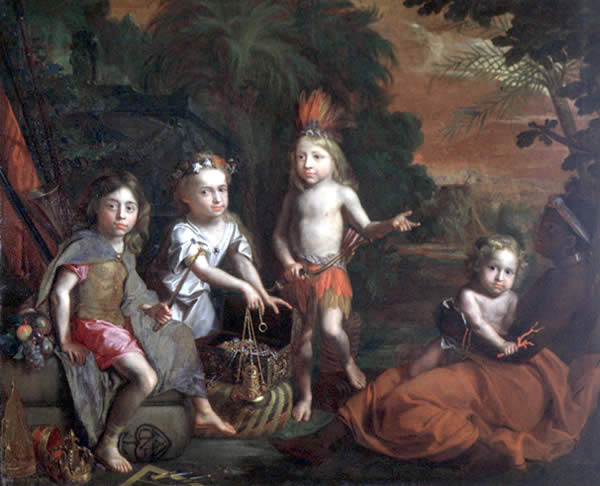
Gregor Brandmüller (1661-1691), Les Trésors de l'Amérique, Musée du Nouveau Monde, La Rochelle

He also painted portraits, which he elaborated with the introduction of symbolic and historical attributes. His painting Les Trésors de l'Amérique (1682; Musée du Nouveau Monde, La Rochelle) is an allegorical portrait of four children, one of whom is held in the arms of a black nurse wearing a slave-collar; the other three are dressed to represent Asia, Europe and America, with the various "treasures" lying at their feet.

He died young in 1690.
