= Hryhoriy Chernysh =

Ukrainian politician (born 1941)

Grigoriy Semyonovich Chernish (Ukrainian: Григорій Семенович Черниш; born 12 June 1941) was a candidate in the 2004 Ukrainian presidential election, nominated by the Party of Rehabilitation of Infirm People, which he has chaired since 1994. He had earlier in 1999 attempted to run as a candidate for the 1999 Ukrainian presidential election, and he submitted documents to a district-level election commission but did not qualify as a nationwide candidate.

== Biography ==
Chernish was born on 12 June 1941 in the village of Frontivka, which was located within the Vinnytsia Oblast of the Ukrainian SSR. In 1958 he completed his secondary education at the Yastrubyntsi Secondary School, and then worked as a railway worker and completed his mandatory conscription for the Soviet Army before in 1963 he entered the Bogomolets National Medical University. However, he did not graduate and receive his diploma, so he later enrolled in the Russian National Research Medical University where he graduated from in 1980. He then practiced non-traditional methods of treatment in a private practice, for which he was convicted for, but the conviction was expunged.

In 1992, he founded an international charity named the "Worldwide aid organization for infirm people" and the medical diagnostic concern "Aesculapius", which he chairs. In 1994, he was elected an Active member (academician) of Russian Federation Academy of Medical Technical Sciences for alternative methods of medical treatment. In 1995, he was elected an Academician of Social Sciences of the Russian Federation for new forms of market relationships between commercial organizations (Charity). Prior to 2004, he worked in providing free treatment to children and those affected by the Chernobyl disaster using non-traditional medicine.

During the 2004 Ukrainian presidential election, he ran on a campaign program of rehabilitating the "dead zone" of Chernobyl, implementation of prviatization and land reform, spiritual revivalism, and building special cities for "lawbreakers and convicts".
