= Grigoryan =

Grigorian or Grigoryan (Armenian: Գրիգորյան) is an Armenian surname. It is a patronym from the Armenian equivalent of Gregory and is the Eastern Armenian form of Krikorian.

It can refer to the following people:

- Aghvan Grigoryan (born 1969), Armenian weightlifter
- Aleksandr Grigoryan (born 1966), Armenian football coach and former player
- Aleksandra Grigoryan (born 2005), Armenian weightlifter
- Anna Grigoryan (born 1991), Armenian politician and MP
- Aram Grigoryan, multiple people
- Aramais Grigorian (born 1973), Armenian figure skater
- Armen Grigoryan, multiple people
- Arsen Grigoryan, multiple people
- Artak Grigoryan (born 1987), Armenian footballer
- Artur Grigorian (born 1967), Uzbek boxer
- Artur Grigoryan (born 1985), Armenian football player
- Arusiak Grigorian – Armenian chess player
- Arusyak Grigoryan – Armenian woman sports shooter
- Arutyun Grigoryan (born 1998), Russian football player
- Asmik Grigorian (born 1981), Lithuanian opera singer
- Avetik Grigoryan (born 1989), Armenian chess grandmaster
- Bagrat Grigorian (1939–1992), Armenian painter
- David Grigoryan, multiple people
- Diana Grigoryan (born 1982), Armenian producer, story writer, actress, and television host
- Edgar Grigoryan (born 1998), Armenian football player
- Eduard Grigoryan (1929–1988), Soviet footballer
- Elen Grigoryan (born 1988), Armenian weightlifter
- Gegham Grigoryan (1951–2016), Armenian opera singer
- Grigor Grigoryan (born 1992), Armenian freestyle wrestler
- Harut Grigorian (born 1989), Armenian-Belgian kickboxer
- Hambarsoom Grigorian (1893–1975), Iranian-Armenian composer and music professor
- Hayk Grigoryan (born 1976), American jurist
- Hripsime Grigoryan (born 1988), Armenian politician
- Karen Grigoryan, multiple people
- Kirill Grigoryan (born 1992), Russian shooter
- Kristinne Grigoryan (born 1981), Armenian human rights lawyer and intelligence officer
- Leonard Grigoryan, Australian classical guitarist and recording artist
- Levon Ashotovich Grigorian (1947–1975), Soviet Armenian chess player
- Manvel Grigoryan (1956–2020), Armenian military leader and a member of the National Assembly of Armenia
- Marat Grigorian (born 1991), Armenian-Belgian kickboxer
- Marcos Grigorian (1925–2007), Iranian-Armenian artist
- Mark Grigorian (1900–1978), Armenian neoclassical architect
- Mher Grigoryan (born 1972), Armenian politician
- Nairi Grigorian (born 1968), Spanish pianist
- Narek Grigoryan (born 2001), Armenian professional footballer
- Narine Grigoryan (born 1980), Armenian actress
- Razmik Grigoryan, multiple people
- Rita Grigorian (born 2000), Armenian-American soccer player
- Roman Grigoryan (born 1982), Russian footballer
- Sabrina Grigorian (1956–1986), Italian-born Armenian actress
- Samvel Grigoryan (1907–1987), Soviet Armenian poet and translator
- Sasun Grigoryan (1942–1993), Armenian neoclassical architect
- Sergo Grigorian (born 1961), Russian art collector
- Serob Grigoryan (born 1995), Armenian-Russian association football player
- Sevada Grigoryan (born 1959), Armenian artist
- The Grigoryan Brothers, Slava and Leonard (born 1976), Australian classical guitarists
- Stella Grigorian, Georgian operatic mezzo-soprano
- Stella Grigoryan (born 1989), Armenian artist, sculptor and teacher
- Svetlana Grigoryan (1930–2014), Armenian actress
- Valery Grigoryan, Azerbaijani politician

== See also ==
- Krikorian
- Grigoryants
