= Grigoryants =

Grigoryants, Grigoriants and Grigorýanc are transliterations of the Russian surname Григорьянц (of Armenian origin) and the Armenian surname Գրիգորյանց, patronymic derivarions from the given name Grigor. People with those names include:

- Boris Grigorýanc (active from 2005), Turkmen football manager
- Elena Grigoryants (born 1965), Soviet and Russian culturologist, art critic
- Grigory Sarkisovich Grigoryants (1919–1982), Soviet surgeon
- Norat Ter-Grigoryants (born 1936), Soviet and Armenian lieutenant-general
- Sergei Grigoryants (1941–2023), Soviet dissident and former political prisoner, journalist, and literary critic
- Sergey Grigoriants (born 1983), Russian Grandmaster chess player

== See also ==
- Krikorian
- Grigoryan
