= Kirkor =

Kirkor is a given name and a surname. An archaic Polish-language feminine for the surname is Kirkorowa. As an Armenian given name (Գրիգոր), it has variants, Krikor, and Grigor, all being variants of the given name Gregory.

Notable people with the name include:

== Given name ==
- Kirkor Bezdikyan, 19th-century Ottoman Armenian architect and mayor
- Kirkor Canbazyan (1912–2002), Turkish cyclist
- Kirkor Kirkorov (born 1968), Bulgarian boxer
- Kirkor Zöhrap (1861–1915), Armenian writer, politician and lawyer

== Surname ==
- Adam Kirkor (1818–1886), Polish publisher, journalist and archeologist
- Helena Kirkorowa (1828–1900), Polish theatre actress
- Zofia Kirkor-Kiedroniowa (1872–1952), Polish national activist

== Fictional characters ==
- Prince Kirkor, character in Balladyna (film)

== See also ==
- Kirkorov and Kerkorian, surnames derived from the name
