= Krikor =

Krikor is a Western Armenian given name, equivalent to Eastern Armenian given name Grigor and the English equivalent Gregory and its variants in different languages. A diminutive of the name is Koko. A variant is Kirkor.

Notable people with the name include:

== Religion ==
- Gregory of Narek (951–1003), or Krikor Naregatsi, Armenian monk, poet, mystical philosopher, theologian and saint of the Armenian Apostolic Church

Catholicoi

- Gregory the Illuminator (257–331), patron saint and first official head of the Armenian Apostolic Church
- Gregory II the Martyrophile (1035–1105), Catholicos of the Armenian Apostolic Church (1066-1105)
- Gregory IV the Young (1173–1193)
- Gregory V of Cilicia (1193–1194)
- Gregory VI of Cilicia (1194–1203)
- Gregory VII of Cilicia (1293–1307)
- Gregory VIII of Cilicia (1411–1418)
- Gregory IX of Cilicia (1439–1446)
- Gregory X (1443–1465)
- Gregory XI (1536–1545)
- Gregory XII (1576–1590)

Armenian Patriarchs of Jerusalem

- Krikor Yetesattzi of Jerusalem (669–696)
- Patriarch Krikor of Jerusalem (981–1006)
- Patriarch Krikor of Jerusalem (1356–1363)
- Patriarch Krikor Kantzagehtzee of Jerusalem (1613–1645)
- Krikor Shiravantzee (Chainbearer) (1715–1749)

Armenian patriarchs of Constantinople

- Patriarch Krikor I of Constantinople (1526–1537)
- Patriarch Krikor II of Constantinople (1601–1608, 1611–1621, 1623–1626)
- Patriarch Krikor III of Constantinople (1764–1773)
- Patriarch Krikor IV of Constantinople (1801–1802)

Contemporary

- Krikor Bedros XV Agagianian or Grégoire-Pierre Agagianian (1895–1971), Patriarch Catholicos of Cilicia of the Armenian Catholic Church (1937–1962) and Catholic cardinal, Prefect of the Congregation for the Evangelization of Peoples (1958–1970)
- Krikor Balakian (1875–1934), Armenian bishop
- Krikor Bedros XX Gabroyan (1934–2021), Patriarch-Catholicos of the Armenian Catholic Church

== Persons carrying the name Krikor ==
- Krikor Agathon (1901–1979), Egyptian sport shooter, fencer and Olympian
- Krikor Agopian (born 1942), Lebanese Armenian painter
- Krikor Alozian (born 1979), Lebanese Armenian footballer
- Krikor Amirian (1888–1964), Armenian Revolutionary, who participated in the establishment of the First Republic of Armenia
- Krikor Ayvazian (1912–1997), Armenian Catholic Bishop of Qamishli
- Krikor Azaryan (1934–2009), Bulgarian Armenian theatre director
- Krikor Badrossian, 20th-century Armenian communist politician
- Krikor Balyan (1764–1831), Armenian architect
- Krikor Beledian (born 1945), Lebanese-born Armenian writer, literary critic, and translator living in France
- Krikor Bogharian, Armenian diarist and genocide survivor
- Krikor Guerguerian (1911–1988), Armenian Catholic cleric and genocide archivist
- Krikor Kalfayan (1873–1949), Armenian writer, lecturer, musician, and musicologist
- Krikor Mekhitarian (born 1986), Brazilian Armenian chess grandmaster
- Krikor Odian (1834–1887), Ottoman Armenian jurist, politician and writer
- Krikor Ohanian, original name of Mike Connors (1925–2017), American actor
- Krikor Pambuccian (1915–1996), Armenian–Romanian professor of pathology
- Krikor Peshtimaldjian (1778–1839), Ottoman Armenian philosopher, educator, translator, and linguist
- Krikor Torosian (1884–1915), Armenian satirist, journalist and publisher
- Krikor Zohrab (1861–1915), Ottoman Armenian writer

== Middle name ==
- Haroutune Krikor Daghlian, Jr. (1921–1945), Armenian physicist of the Manhattan Project
- Mihran Krikor Kassabian (1870–1910), Armenian American physician

== Others ==
- Gregor (musician) (1898–1971), born Krikor Kélékian, jazz bandleader
- Grégoire Aslan (Coco) born Krikor Aslanian (1908–1982), Swiss ethnic Armenian actor and musician
- Kirk Kerkorian (1917–2015), family romanized first name as Kerkor and last name as Kerkorian, Armenoan-American businessman and philanthropist.

== See also ==
- Grigor
- Krikorian
- Surp Krikor Lusavoriç Armenian Church, Kuzguncuk, Armenian church in Istanbul
- Gregory (given name) and variant Gregor
