= Kirkorov =

Kirkorov (Bulgarian or Russian: Киркоров) is a Bulgarian masculine surname converted into Bulgarian from the Armenian surname Krikorian / Kerkorian. Its feminine counterpart is Kirkorova. It may refer to

- Bedros Kirkorov (1932–2025), Bulgarian-Russian singer and bandleader
- Kirkor Kirkorov (born 1968), Bulgarian boxer
- Philipp Kirkorov (born 1967), Russian pop singer of Armenian-Bulgarian origin, son of Bedros

== See also ==
- Helena Kirkorowa
