= Grigor =

Grigor is a masculine given name and a surname. Variants include Gregory, Gregor, Grigori, Grigory, and in Western Armenian as Krikor or Kirkor.

== People with the given name ==
- Grigor III Pahlavuni (1093–1166), Armenian catholicos
- Grigor Aghababyan (1911–1977), Soviet Armenian architect
- Grigor Artsruni (1845–1892), Armenian journalist
- Grigor Dimitrov (born 1991), Bulgarian tennis player
- Grigor Gurzadyan (1922–2014), Armenian astronomer
- Grigor Koprov (born 1943), Macedonian musician
- Grigor Marzuantsi (18th century), Armenian book printer
- Grigor Meliksetyan (born 1986), Armenian footballer
- Grigor Nachovich (1845–1920), Bulgarian politician
- Grigor Parlichev (1830–1893), Bulgarian writer
- Grigor Paron-Ter (17th century), Armenian Patriarch of Jerusalem
- Grigor Tatevatsi (14th century), Armenian philosopher
- Grigor Taylor (born 1943), Australian actor
- Grigor Topalli (born 1992), Albanian footballer
- Grigor Vachkov (1932–1980), Bulgarian actor
- Grigor Vitez (1911–1966), Croatian writer
- Ronald Grigor Suny (born 1940), American historian

== People with the surname ==
- George Grigor (1916–1992), Canadian ice hockey centre
- James Grigor (c. 1811–1848), English botanist
- Murray Grigor (born 1939), Scottish filmmaker
- William Grigor (1798–1857), Scottish-born physician, legislative councillor, and politician

== See also ==
- Gregory (given name) and variant Gregor
- Grigori
- Grigory
- Krikor, Western Armenian given name (equivalent to Eastern Armenian Grigor)
