= Pióro =

Pióro is a Polish surname. Archaic feminine forms (may be still used colloquially: Piórowa (by husband), Piórówna (by father). Notable people with the surname include:

- Helena Piórowa (1828–1900), name by the second husband of Helena Kirkorowa, Polish actress
- Tadeusz Pióro (biologist) (1956–2020), Polish biologist, epidemiologist, and politician
- Tadeusz Pióro (generał) (1920–2010), Polish general and military historian
