= List of honorary citizens of Gyumri =

The honorary citizen award is the highest decoration of Gyumri (former Leninakan) town, Armenia. Among the recipients are:

- Charles Aznavour, famous singer, songwriter and actor
- Robert Kocharian, President of Armenia
- Nikolai Ryzhkov, politician
- Mstislav Rostropovich, musician
- Valentina Tereshkova (1965)
- Martiros Sarian, painter (1964)
- Victor Ambartsumian, (1964)
- Hovhannes Bagramian, Marshal of the Soviet Union
- Aram Khachaturian, composer
- Tigran Petrosian, World Chess Champion (1966)
- Loris Tjeknavorian, Maestro
- Aghasi Shaboyan, dancer
- Mariam Aslamazian, painter
- Gevorg Gharibjanian, historian
- Alexander Arutiunian, composer (2005)
- Edvard Mirzoian, composer (2005)
