= Sasun Grigoryan =

Armenian architect (1942–1993)

Sasun Grigoryan Սասուն Սեդրակի Գրիգորյան
- Born: March 18, 1942; Leninakan, Armenian SSR, Soviet Union
- Died: March 13, 1993 (aged 50); Yerevan, Armenia
- Education: National Polytechnic University of Armenia, Yerevan, 1965
- Occupation: Architect
- Buildings: part of Circular Park in Yerevan, Armenia
- Projects: Kumairi State historical and architectural museum reserve 1980, Gyumri, Armenia

Sasun Grigoryan (Armenian: Սասուն Սեդրակի Գրիգորյան, March 18, 1942 – March 13, 1993) was an Armenian neoclassical architect, well known for his work in the city of Leninakan and Yerevan, Armenia.

== Life and work ==
Sasun Grigoryan was born in the city of Leninakan, Armenia, in 1942, to the family of an executive Sedrak Grigoryan and Hripsime Tatevyan, the only sister of famous Tatevyan brothers. He graduated from National Polytechnic University of Armenia in 1965. Immediately after his graduation S.Grigoryan was appointed Senior Architect of the Yerevan Project Institute. It is here where he became a co-author of part of the Circular Park in the capital city: from Teryan Street to Abovyan Street built in 1960–1985. His works portrayed sensitive and artistic trends popular in those years.

He also played a major role in the development of restoration projects of historical landmarks in the city of Gyumri, working in 1979 - 1993, in Leninakan (now Gyumri), as Special Art Director for Reconstruction and Restoration. Thanks to Sasun Grigoryan's efforts Kumairi State historical and architectural museum reserve, including Dzitoghtsyan Museum of National Architecture housing collections related to history, the everyday-life of Gyumri, paintings and other works of art, in 1980 Gyumri was designed and implemented. It is for this project that with 2 other co-authors he received a most prestigious State Prize of the Soviet Union in 1985.

Sasun Grigoryan also restored Sergey Merkurov’s house turning it into his museum, as well as the house-museum of distinguished artists Mariam and Eranuhi Aslamazyan, the houses being included into Gyumri historical heritage. Among his works on more than 50 restored buildings, the most notable ones in this city are the restoration designs of the Children’s Creative Centre, the Puppet Theatre, the Tsaghikyan Beer Factory.

In 2014 in Ryzhkov street in Gyumri a memorial tablet was unveiled to commemorate Sasun Grigoryan, citizen and architect. Sasun Grigoryan died in Yerevan on March 13, 1993.

== Projects ==
1. Part of Malatia-Sebastia District, Yerevan
2. Design of B1 and B2 communities in the South-Western residential district, Malatia-Sebastia District Yerevan
3. A nine-storied building with 2-level apartments, Yerevan
4. The residential building of the State Bank in Tigranyan Street, Yerevan
5. A residential building in Papazyan Street blind alley, Yerevan
6. A residential building of the Blind Union in Nork District, Yerevan.
7. A Wedding Palace, Yerevan
8. A part of the Circular Park between Teryan and Abovyan Streets, Yerevan
9. Expansion works in Stanislavski Russian Theatre of Yerevan
10. Kumairi State historical and architectural museum reserve 1980, Gyumri, Armenia
11. Restoration of VII century St.Astvatsatsin Church and St. Gospel chapel in Mayisyan, Armenia
12. Restoration projects of the Holy Saviour's Church, Gyumri and Cathedral of the Holy Mother of God, Gyumri

== Gallery ==
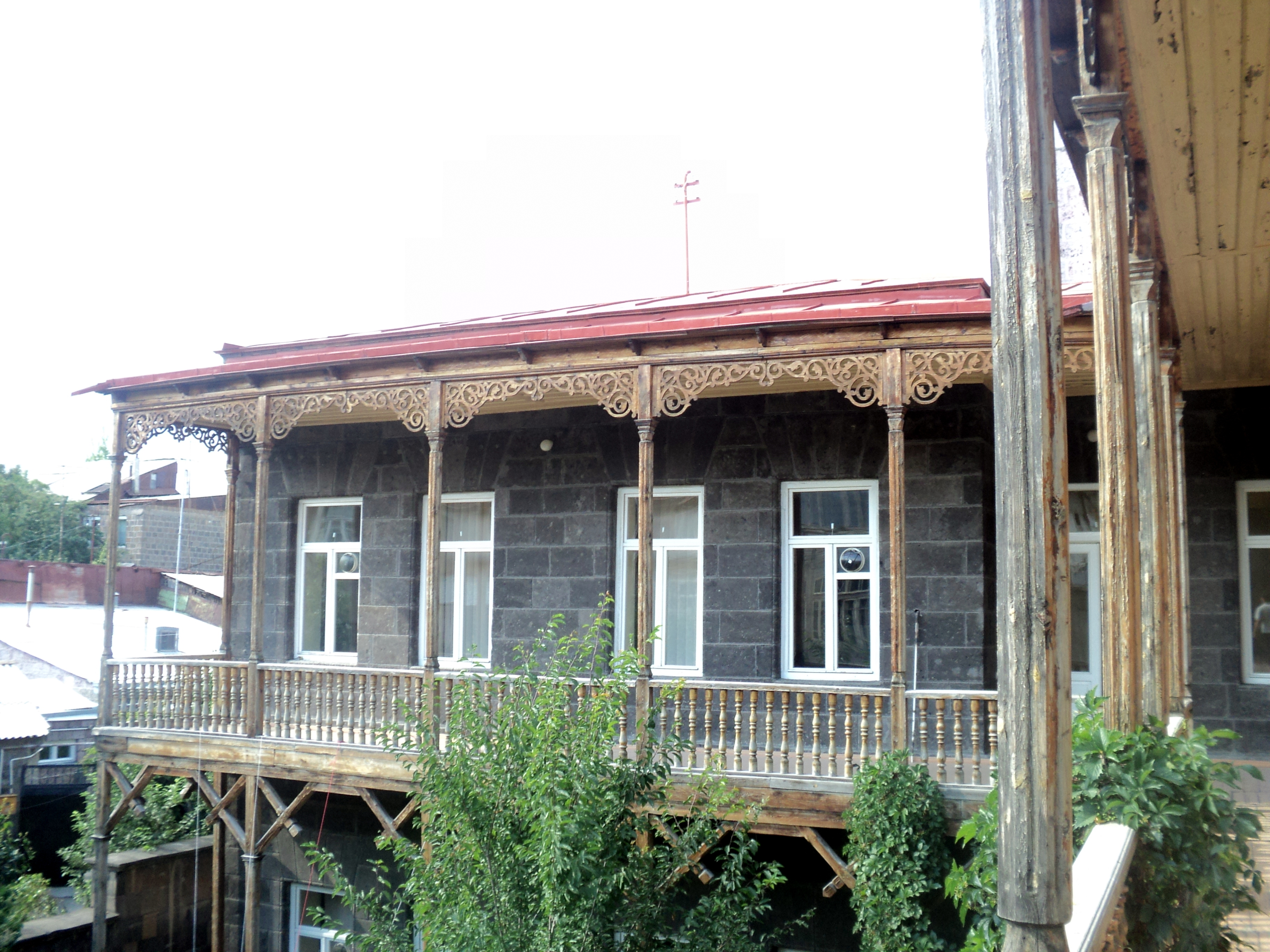
The house- museum of Mariam Aslamazian and Yeranuhi Aslamazian

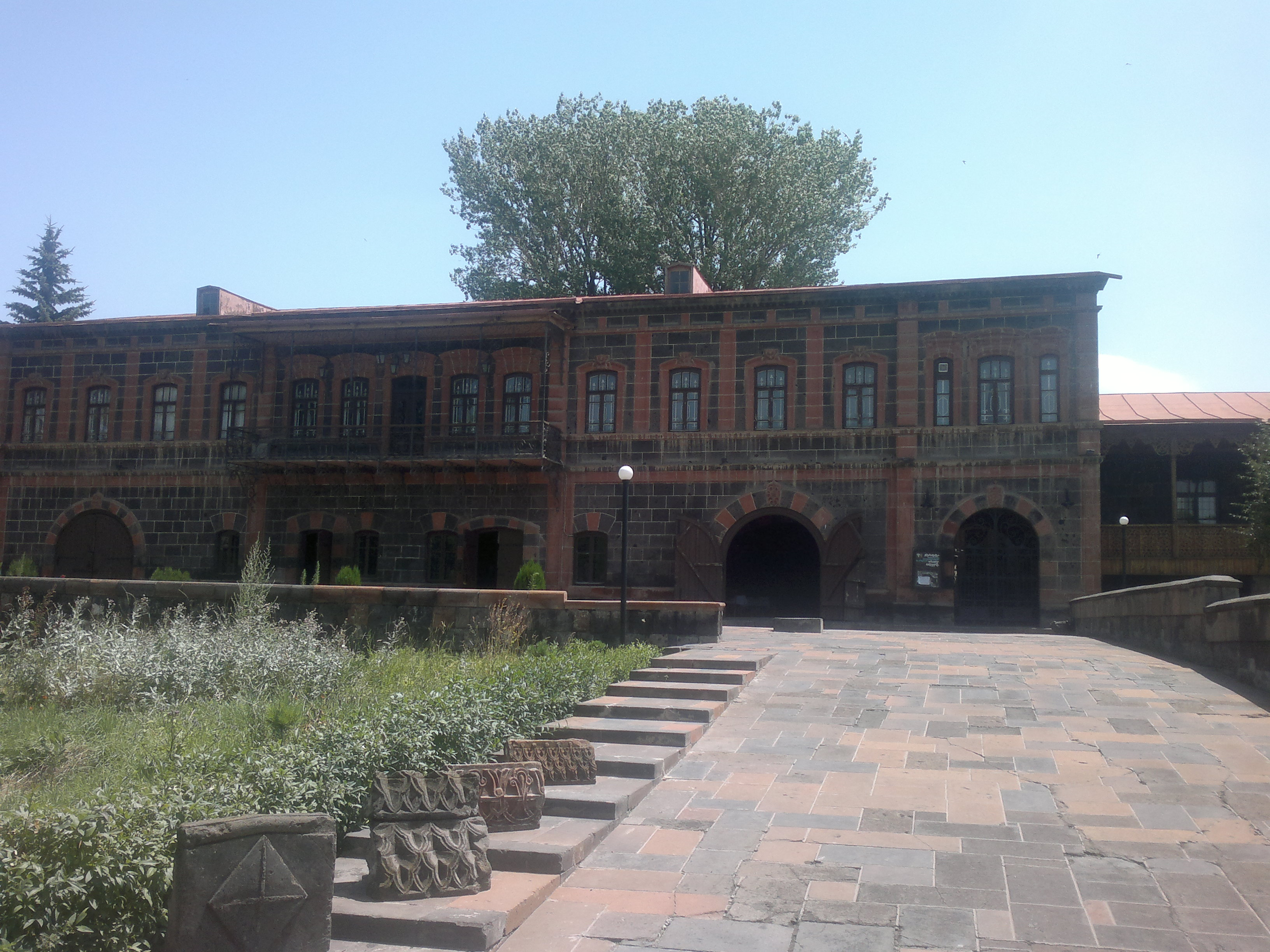
The Dzitoghtsyan family house

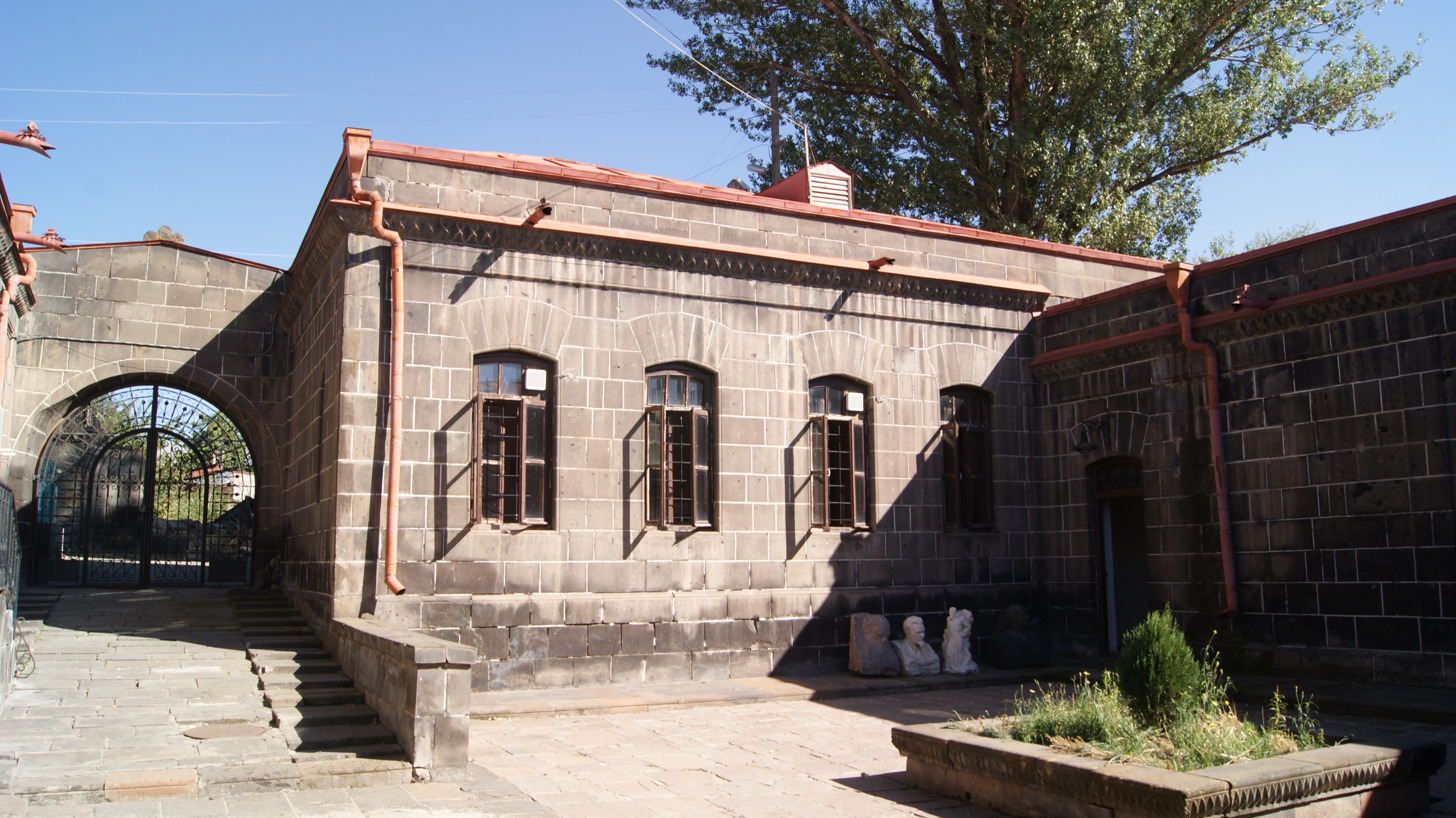
Sergey Merkurov's House-Museum

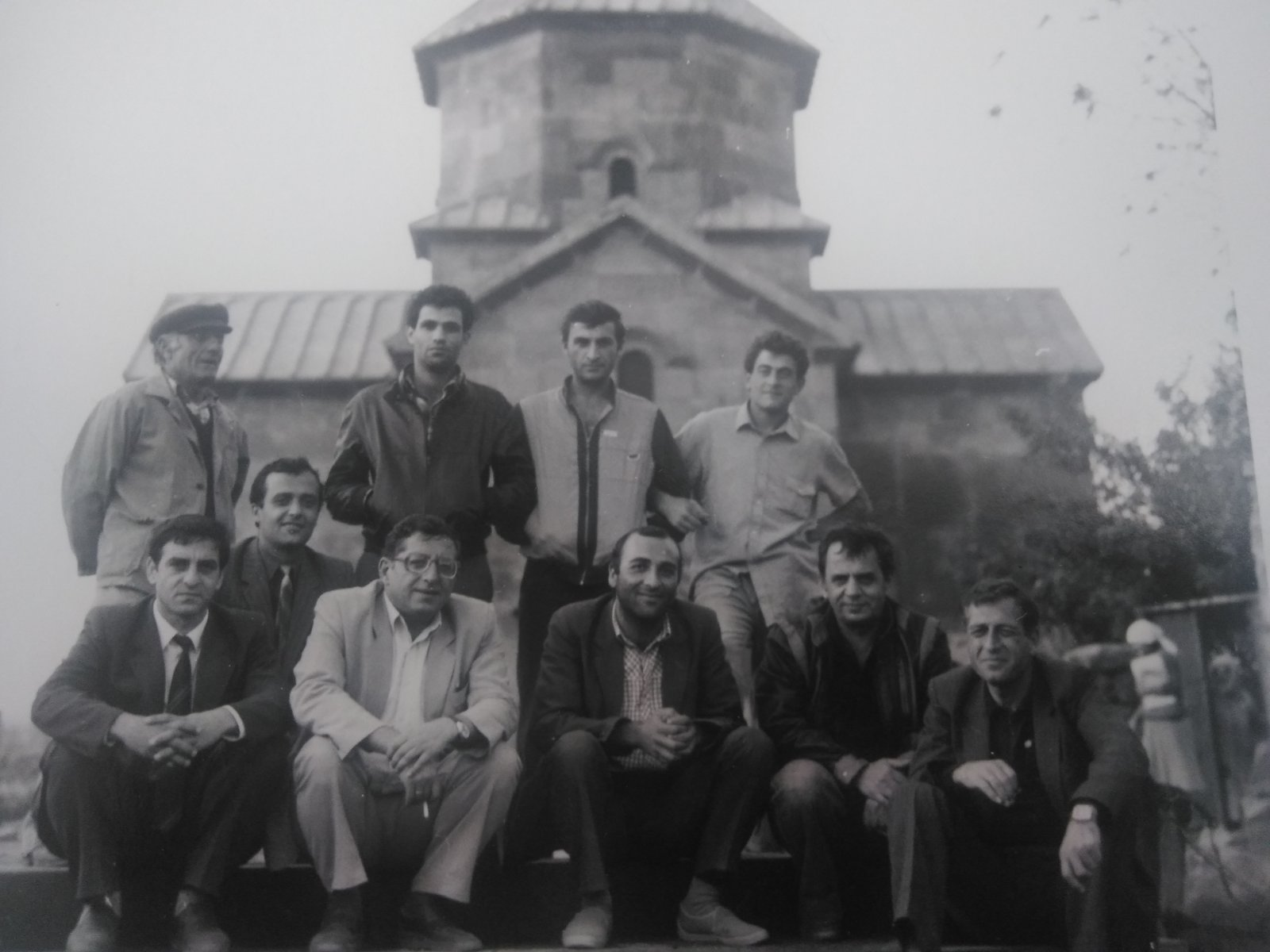
After restoration of St.Astvatsatsin Church in Mayisyan, Armenia
