= Ter-Grigoryan =

Ter-Grigoryan or Ter-Grigoryan (Armenian: Տեր-Գրիգորյան) is an Armenian surname.

- Anatoli Ter-Grigoryan, birth name of Anatoly Eiramdzhan (1937–2014), Russian-Armenian film director, writer and producer
- Vahan Ter-Grigoryan, birth name of Vahan Terian (1885–1920), Armenian poet, lyrist and public activist

== See also ==
- Grigoryan
- Ter-Grigoryants
