= Karen Grigoryan (disambiguation) =

Karen Grigoryan (born 1985) is Russian public and political figure

Karen Grigorian or Karen Grigoryan may also refer to:

- Karen Grigorian (1947–1989), Armenian chess player
- Karen L. Grigorian (born 1968), Armenian diplomat
- Karen H. Grigoryan (born 1995), Armenian chess player
