= Krikorian =

Krikorian (Armenian: Գրիգորեան) is an Armenian surname. It is a patronym from Krikor, an Armenian equivalent of Gregory. Notable people with the surname include:

- Adam Krikorian (born 1974), American water polo coach
- Blake Krikorian (1967–2016), American entrepreneur
- David Krikorian (born 1968), Cincinnati politician and Ohio congressional candidate
- Doug Krikorian, American veteran sportswriter and sports talk show host
- Evan Krikorian, Armenian-American creative technologist and new media scholar
- Garabed Krikorian (1847–1920) Armenian photographer in Jerusalem
- John Krikorian (born 1974), American basketball coach
- Krikor Krikorian, technical consulting, co-founder of KBC Advanced Technologies
- Mark Krikorian, multiple people
- Nerses Krikorian (1921–2018), Armenian-American chemist and intelligence officer
- Raffi Krikorian (born 1978), Armenian-American technology executive
- Raphaël Krikorian (born 1968), French mathematician
- Steve M. Krikorian (born 1950), aka Tonio K, American musician
- Tamara Krikorian (1944–2009), British video artist and public art curator

== See also ==
- Krikorian Premier Theaters
- Kerkorian (surname)
- Grigoryan, a variant of Krikorian
