= Gallery of Mariam and Yeranuhi Aslamazyan Sisters =

Art gallery in Armenia

The Gallery of Mariam and Yeranuhi Aslamazyan Sisters
- Մարիամ և Երանուհի Ասլամազյան քույրերի պատկերասրահ
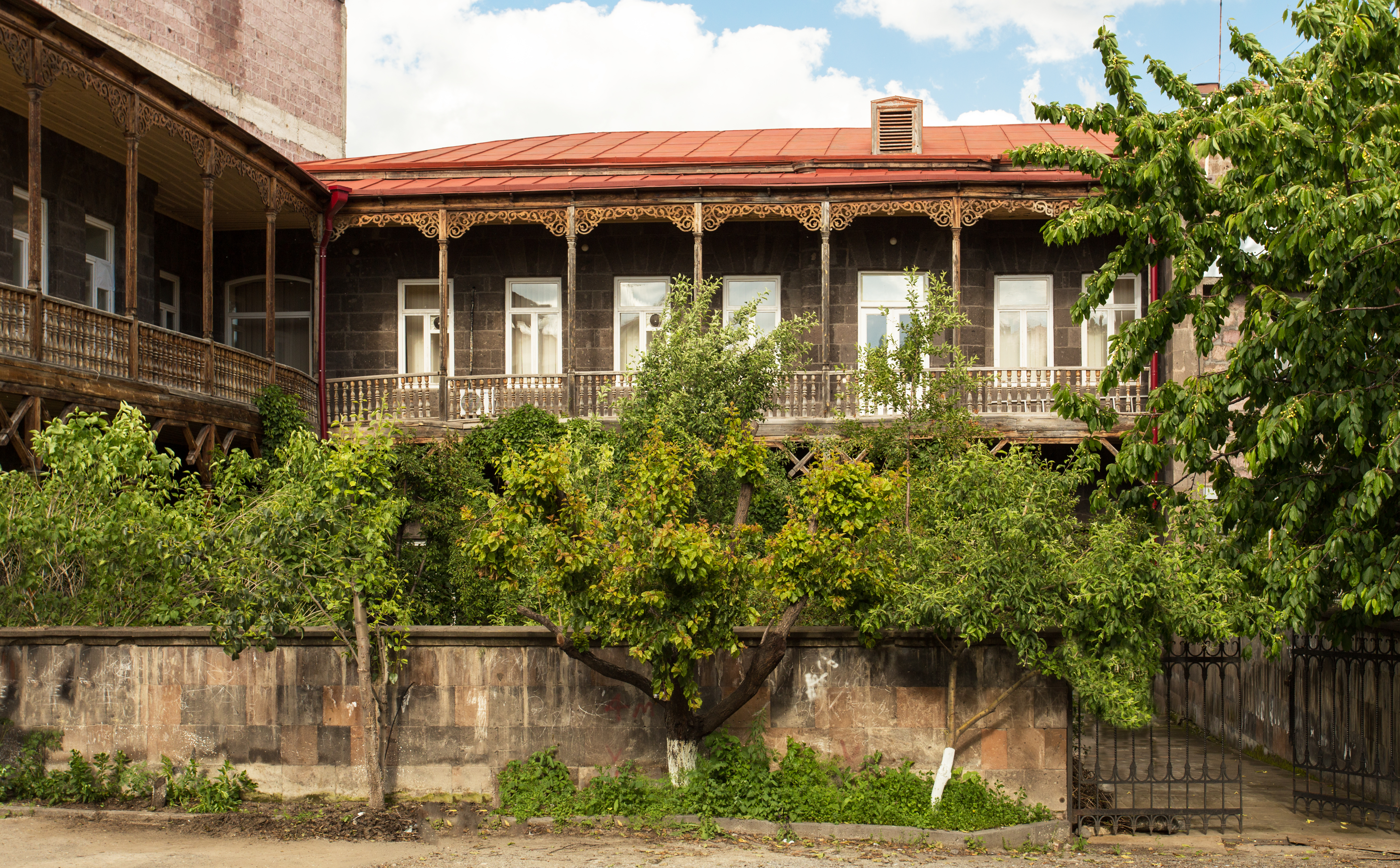
- Established: 1987
- Location: Abovyan St. 242, Gyumri 3104
- Coordinates: 40.7862540°N 43.8409570°E
- Website: www.aslamazyanmuseum.com

The Gallery of Mariam and Yeranuhi Aslamazyan Sisters (arm. Մարիամ և Երանուհի Ասլամազյան քույրերի պատկերասրահ) is a gallery in Armenia, exhibiting the complete collection of the painting, graphic, ceramic works of Mariam and Yeranuhi Aslamazyan sisters. It holds the largest collection of the Aslamazyan sisters' paintings, prints, drawings, and ceramic works of any museum in the world. It is the only museum named after female artists and devoted to female artists in Armenia.

== History and location ==
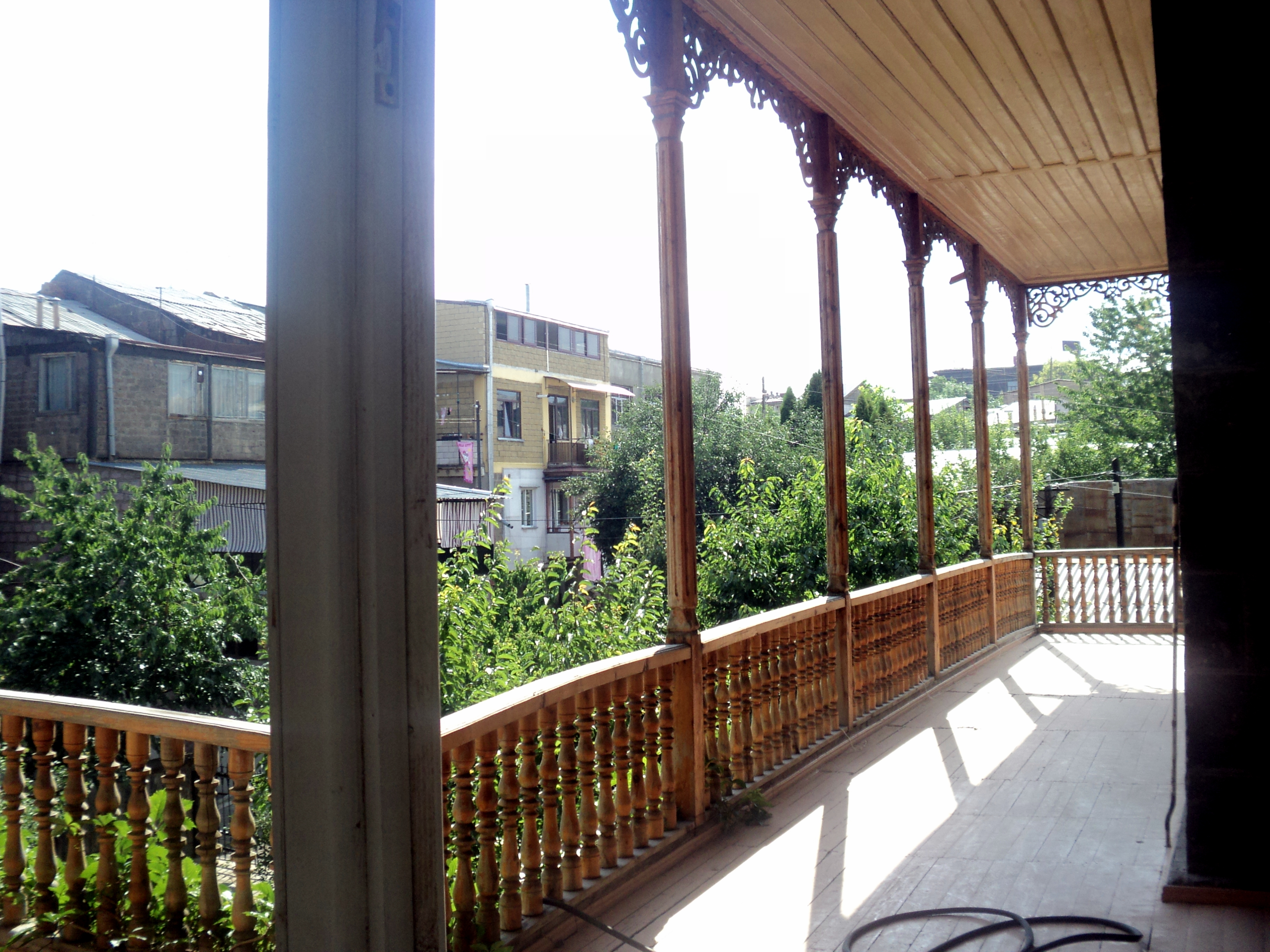
The 19th century style balcony of the Gallery.

The Gallery was established in 1987 by the sisters themselves, and by the time of their deaths, they had donated about 620 of their original paintings, ceramics and graphic works, which are now proudly displayed there.

The Gallery is located off the central square of the Kumayri historic district of Gyumri. The building was constructed as a private residence in 1880 by the Qeshishovs family, who were known to be wealthy merchants. After the ruinous earthquake of 1988 the building of the gallery was given to the homeless people and was reopened in 2004. This building has been protected by the Government since 1980 as a historical and cultural heritage site.

The Gallery has two floors: the first floor displays the works of Yeranuhi, whereas the second floor displays works by Mariam. The Gallery has an inner courtyard and a wooden balcony and its style is typical of the 19th century urban architecture in Alexandrapol, which is a fusion of European and traditional Armenian architectural elements of that time.

== Collections ==
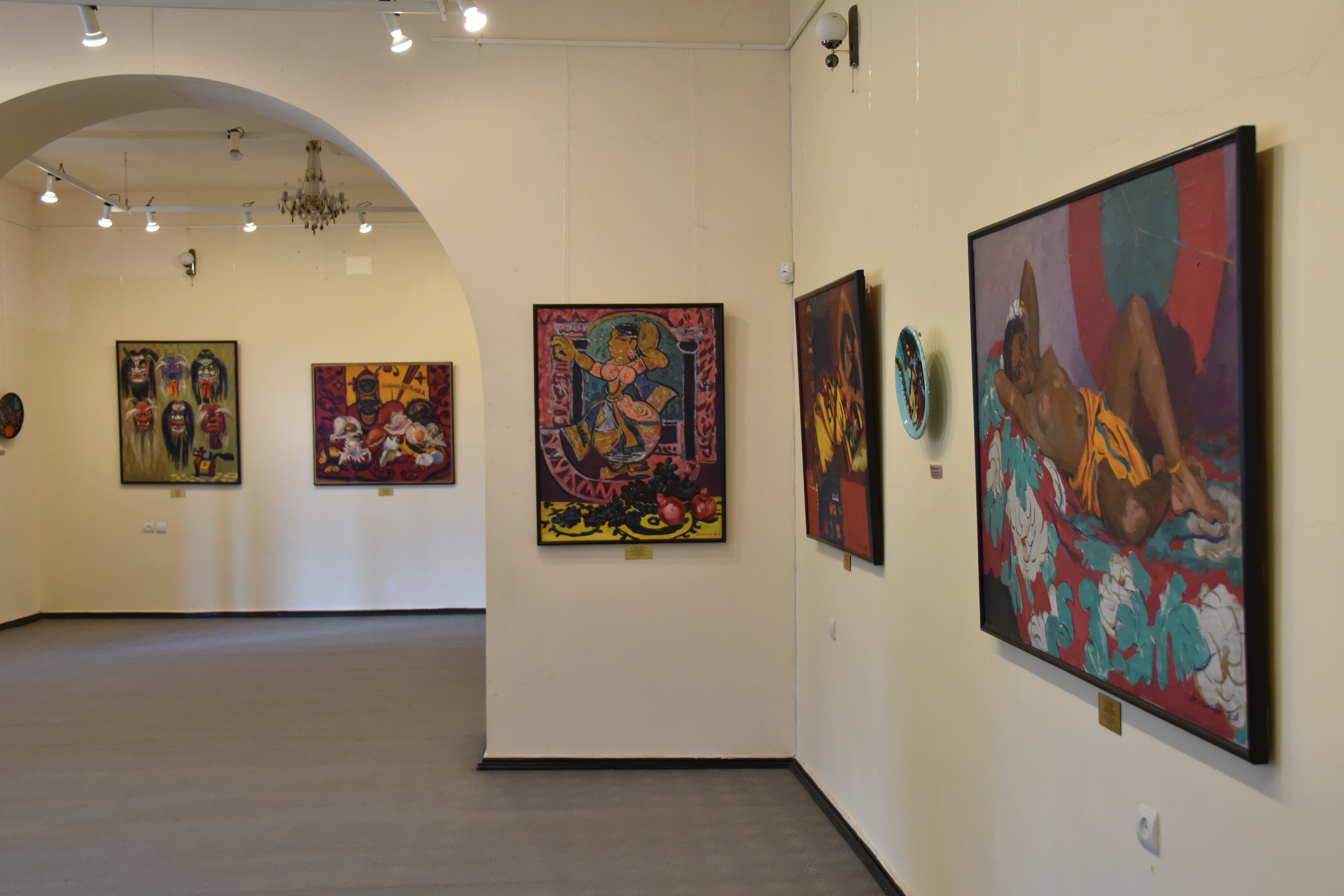
Exhibition of Mariam and Yeranuhi Aslamazyan Sisters' works at the Gallery.

Mariam and Yeranuhi Aslamazyan were born in Bash-Shirak (present-day Yerazgavors village/Shirak marz) of Kars province in 1907 and 1910 respectively. They received their first painting education at the Alexandrapol Painting School – the first painting school in Transcaucasia, founded in 1905 – which played a very important role in securing painters' profession. Later, the sisters continued their painting education at the Yerevan Fine Arts College, Moscow's and Leningrad's High Schools of Art (nowadays Saint Petersburg Academy of Fine Arts).

=== Mariam Aslamazyan ===
Mariam Aslamazyan, as a female artist, has her own role and place in Armenian art. She dedicated her life to art and used her creativity to develop Armenian and international art. Mariam, through her cultural activities, succeeded in successfully overcoming one of the greatest challenges of her time: promoting the role of female artists in Soviet-Armenian society. In Mariam's art, we can see the artist developed a style that captured the spirit and essence of objects; she found beauty even in everyday household items. In her art, she tried to reconsider the Soviet and post-war years from her own point of view, expressing her attitude towards the consequences of those years. She created a flat decorative style in her portraits, still lives and nature scenes. Mariam's own life is presented in her work, which bears witness to her inner thoughts and feelings.

The works of Mariam Aslamazyan are conserved in numerous museums: Sofia, Berlin, Leningrad, Venice, Tokyo, Delhi, etc. The works devoted to India have been entitled to the laureate after G.Neru prize in 1970–1971, the prize of Hamal Abdenaser in 1976.

Mariam Aslamazyan died in 2006. Her body has been moved and buried in Yerevan.

=== Yeranuhi Aslamazyan ===
Yeranuhi Aslamazyan's work has been influential in 20th century Armenian painting. Her style is characterized by her restraint, delicate color passages, and ideological layers. She paid great attention to the human spirit and human values, and she believed in the importance of human creativity. She worked mainly in a realistic style in her portraits, paintings, and still-life genre scenes. Even though she repeated subjects, we see new creative issues continued to emerge in her art, the goal of which was not to provide conclusions for viewers, but rather to let them think.

The works of Yeranuhi are conserved in numerous museums: London, Sofia, Berlin, Leningrad, Venice, Tokyo, Delhi, etc.

Yeranuhi Aslamazyan died in 1988 and was buried in Moscow.

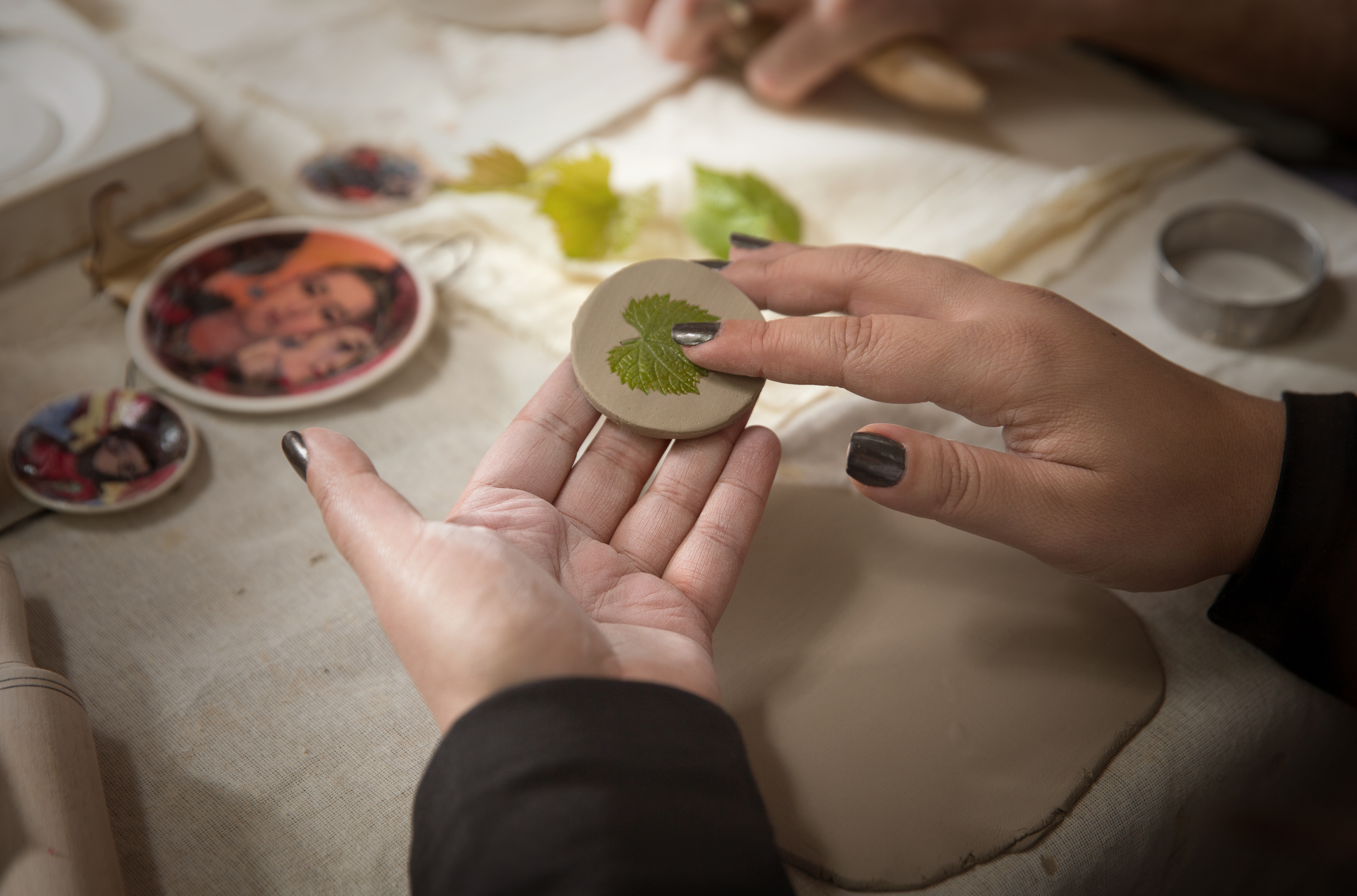
Ceramic work presented at the Gallery of Mariam and Yeranuhi Aslamazyan Sisters.

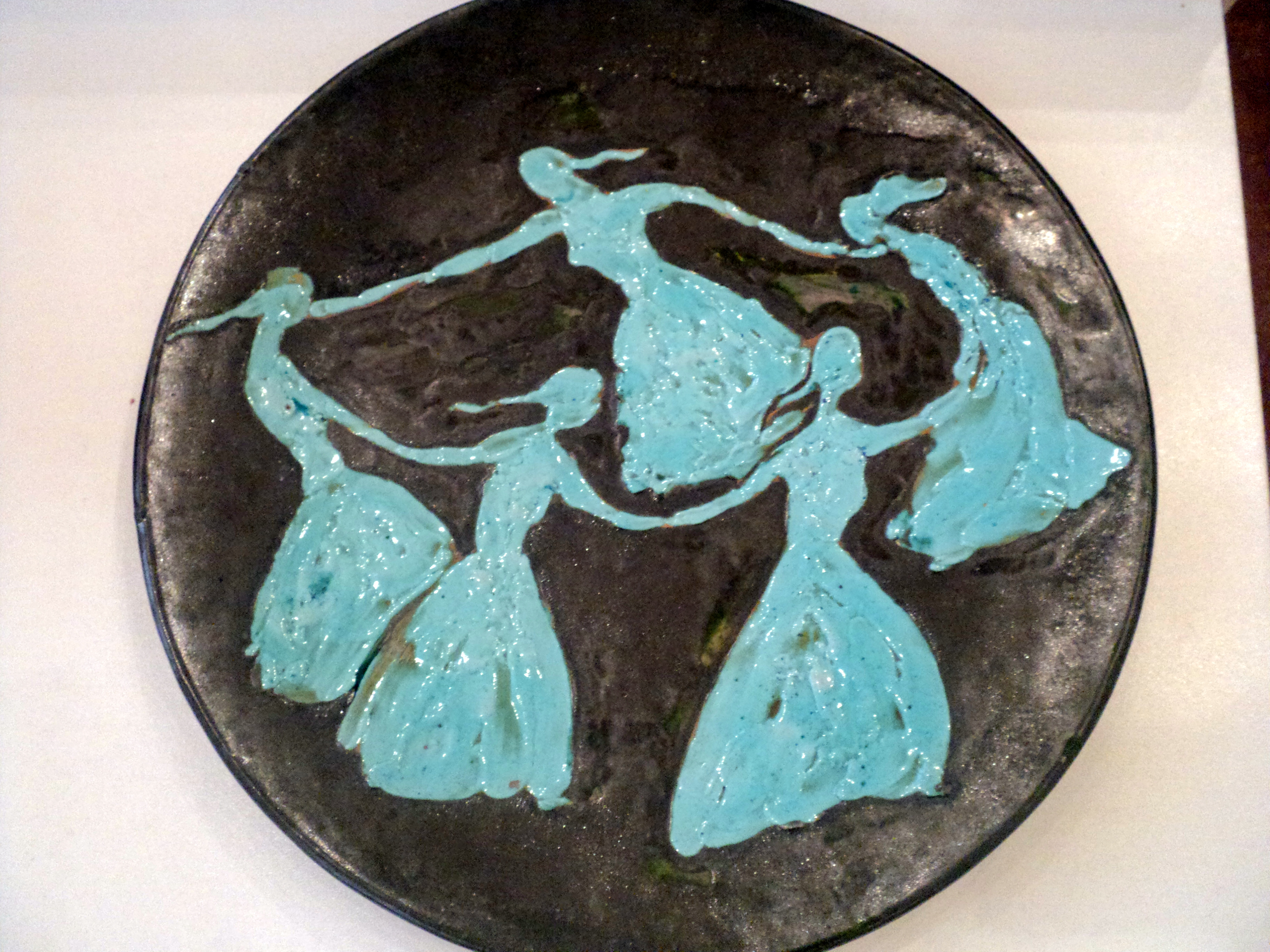
Ceramics presented at the Gallery.

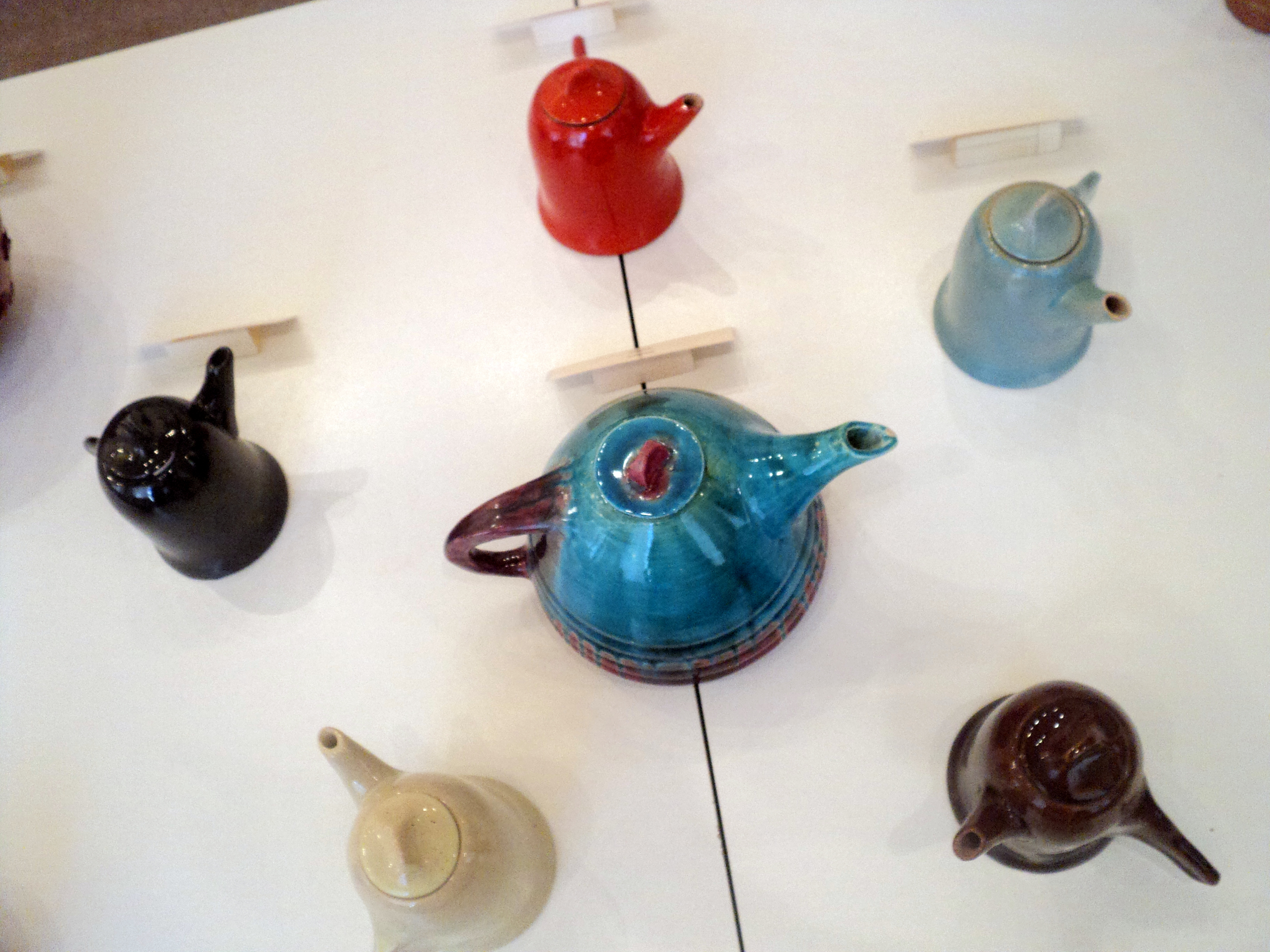
Ceramic works presented at the Gallery.
