= Mark Krikorian =

Mark Krikorian may refer to:

- Mark Krikorian (activist), American activist and immigration executive
- Mark Krikorian (soccer), American sports executive and former soccer coach
