= Krikor Peshtimaldjian =

Krikor Peshtimaldjian (Armenian: Գրիգոր Փեշտիմալջյան, Born Constantinople, Ottoman Turkey 1778 - died Constantinople, Ottoman Turkey January, 1839) was an ethnic Armenian philosopher, educator, translator, and linguist. He was a key figure in the Armenian national awakening and reformist movement in the 19th century.
