= Yeranuhi Aslamazyan =

Armenian and Soviet artist (1910–1998)

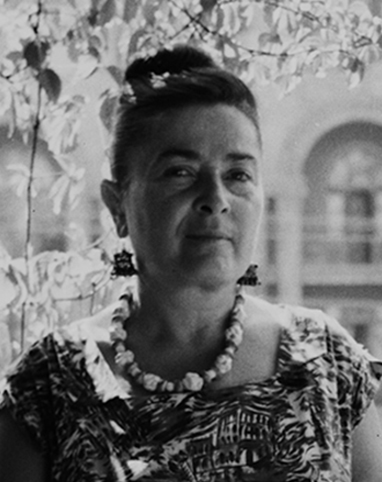
- Born: 15 April 1910; Bash-Shirak, Kars Oblast, Russian Empire
- Died: 4 February 1998 (aged 87); Moscow, Russia
- Family: Mariam Aslamazyan (sister)

Yeranuhi (Yeran) Arshaki Aslamazyan (Armenian: Երանուհի Արշակի Ասլամազյան;15 April 1910 – 4 February 1998) was an Armenian and Soviet artist and graphic artist. She was a member of the Artists' Union of the USSR and an Honored Artist of the Armenian SSR.

== Life ==
Yeranuhi Aslamazyan was born on 15 April 1910 in Bash-Shirak village in the Kars Oblast of the Russian Empire. Her father Arshak Aslamazyan was a well-known miller who in the 1920s was recognized as a kulak, and all his property was gradually confiscated by the Soviet authorities. From 1924 to 1926 Aslamazyan studied at the Leninakan Painting School, and from 1926 to 1928 she continued her studies in Yerevan Artistic Production College. Shortly after graduation Aslamazyan along with her older sister Mariam moved to Moscow with the financial support of their sister Anahit. The sisters applied to the Vkutemas Higher Art and Technical Studios․ However, only Mariam was accepted there, and Yeranuhi entered the studio of painters Vladimir Favorsky and Andrei Goncharov. Life in Moscow was challenging for the Aslamazyan sisters, and after a year, they had to go back to Yerevan.

Having returned to Yerevan, Aslamazyan started to work in a kindergarten and designed decorations for several city holidays. Two years later she moved to Kharkiv to study at the art institute and then was transferred to the Leningrad Academy of Fine Arts. From 1931 to 1937, she studied at Leningrad Institute of Painting, Sculpture and Architecture of All-Russian Academy of Arts and graduated with honor.

== Art ==
From 1938 to 1941 Aslamazyan taught painting and composition at Leningrad Young Workers' Institute of Fine Art. By the end of 1930s, Aslamazyan was already known in Soviet Russian cultural circles, she was a member of the Painter’s Union of Leningrad and was constantly invited to participate in exhibitions in Moscow, Leningrad and Yerevan.

During the World War II, she created works that responded to the demands of the time. In 1945 Aslamazyan was awarded a medal “For Valiant Labour in the Great Patriotic War 1941-1945”.

In 1958, Aslamazyan started to work in ceramics.

Aslamazyan had the backing and financial support of the Soviet Union, which allowed her to travel extensively around the world. Only between 1959 and 1962, she visited Belgium, Holland, Italy, Turkey, India, Ceylon and Egypt.

Aslamazyan received many awards and titles, including the title of National Artist of Armenian SSR (1965), the “Veteran of Labour” medal (1978) and an honorary certificate of the Union Artists of Russian Soviet Federative Social Republic for active and seminal work in the Council of Artists’ House.

In 1987, the Gallery of Mariam and Eranuhi Aslamazyan Sisters was established in Gyumri, Armenia. The sisters donated over 620 of their original paintings, ceramics and graphic works to the gallery. Today the Gallery of Mariam and Eranuhi Aslamazyan Sisters is one of the most popular cultural sites of Gyumri.

The works of Aslamazyan are part the permanent collections of numerous museums in London, Sofia, Berlin, Saint Petersburg, Venice, Tokyo and Delhi.

Aslamazyan was married and had a daughter.

Yeranuhi Aslamazyan died on 4 February 1998 and is buried in Moscow.
