= Karen Grigoryan =

Russian statesman and politician

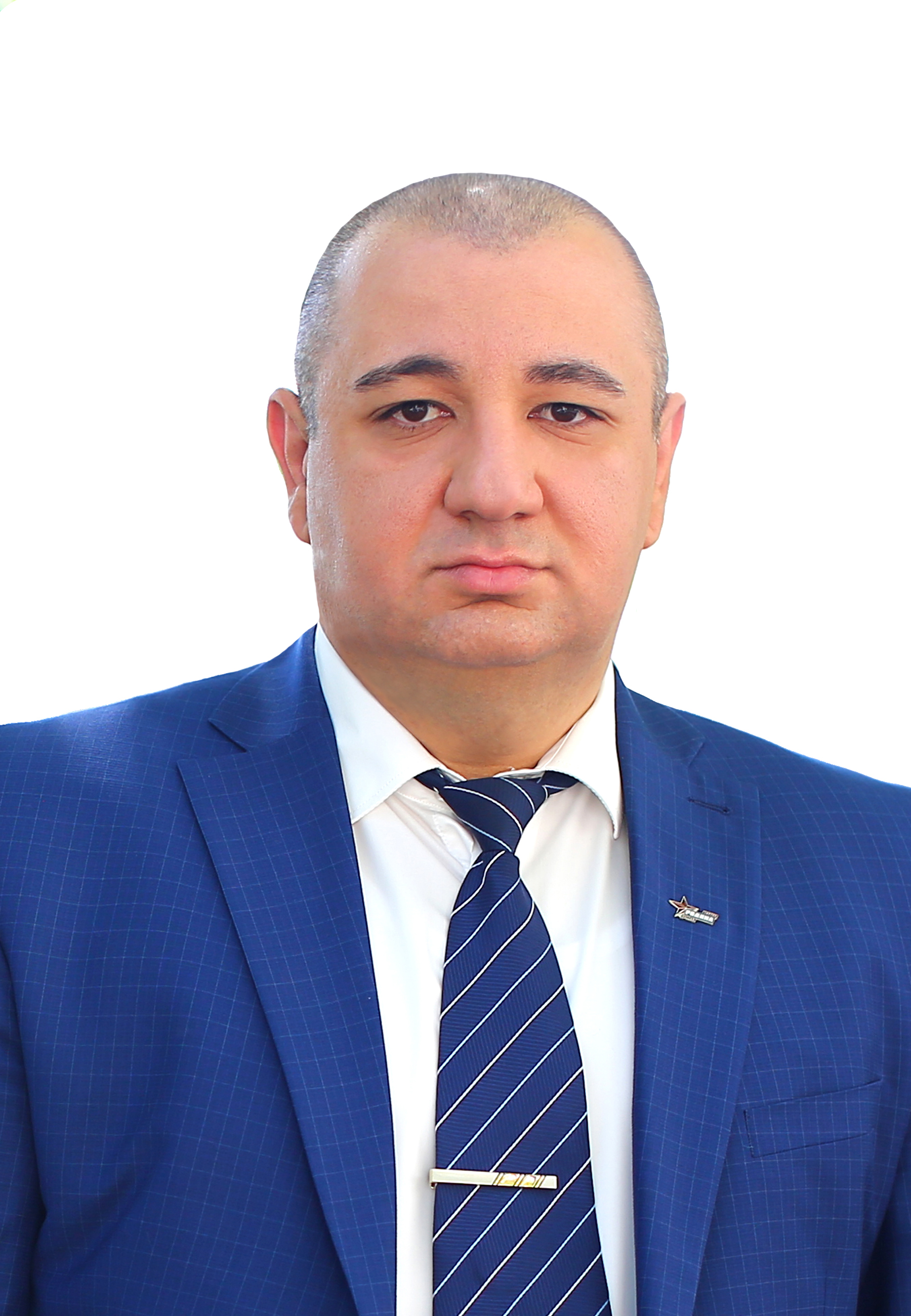
- Born: 2 August 1985 (age 41); Tbilisi, Georgia

Karen Grigoryan (born August 2, 1985, Tbilisi, Georgian Soviet Socialist Republic, USSR) is a Russian public and political figure of Armenian origin.

== Biography ==
Karen Grigoryan was born on August 2, 1985, in the city of Tbilisi, Georgia.

- 2005-2009 He was a sole proprietor.
- 2008-2009 He served in the Russian army.

=== Education ===
2015 - Moscow State University of Mechanical Engineering, specialty - "Management".

=== Family ===
He is married and has two children.

== Activity ==
From 2009 to June 2016, Grigoryan was a member of the Liberal Democratic Party of Russia and left it in July 2016 due to incompatibility of political views. 2009-2012 From 2012 to 2013, he was Deputy Coordinator for Youth Affairs of the Astrakhan Regional Branch of the Liberal Democratic Party of Russia.

From 2013 to 2015, he was the coordinator of the Astrakhan city branch of the Liberal Democratic Party of Russia, and from 2015 to 2016 he was the coordinator of the Astrakhan regional branch of the Liberal Democratic Party of Russia. From April 2017 to the present, Grigoryan is the chairman of the Human Rights and Rule of Law Committee of the Interregional Public Human Rights Organization.

From November 2014 to September 2016, he was a deputy of the State Duma of the fifth convocation from the Astrakhan region.

From January to September 2018, he was an adviser to the governor of the Astrakhan region A.A. Jilkin. In November 2018, Grigoryan was elected chairman of the board of the regional branch of the All-Russian Party of Political Fatherland.

In November 2019, he was appointed Advisor to the Governor of the Astrakhan Region Y. Babushkin. In November 2019, he was appointed assistant to the State Duma deputy A.A. Crane for work in the State Duma.

He was a candidate for the State Duma of the Federal Assembly of the Russian Federation.

Member of the Presidium of the Rodina Party.

== Awards ==
- In 2015 he was awarded the "Order of the RLDK".
- In 2016 he was awarded a diploma of the Astrakhan Region Duma for his long-term conscientious work, high professionalism, for his great personal contribution to the development of the legislation of the Astrakhan region.
