= Rita Grigorian =

American–Armenian footballer

Personal information
- Full name: Rita Marie Grigorian
- Date of birth: 17 October 2000 (age 26)
- Place of birth: United States
- Position: Forward

Youth career
- 2014–2017: Glendale Nitros

International career^{‡}
Years	Team	Apps	(Gls)
2015	Armenia U17	3	(0)
2016–2017	Armenia U19	6	(0)
2021–	Armenia	1	(0)
- ‡ National team caps and goals as of 10 April 2021.

Rita Marie Grigorian (Armenian: Ռիտա Մարի Գրիգորյան; born 17 October 2000) is an American-born Armenian footballer who plays as a forward for the Armenia women's national team.

== Early life ==
Grigorian was raised in Glendale, California.

== High school career ==
Grigorian attended the Glendale High School in her hometown.

== International career ==
Grigorian made her senior debut for Armenia on 8 April 2021 as a 67th-minute substitution in a 2–0 friendly home win over Lebanon.
