= Krikor Bogharian =

Armenian diarist

Krikor Bogharian (1897–1975), was an Armenian diarist and an Armenian genocide survivor.

During the genocide, Krikor Bogharian was deported alongside his entire family to Aleppo, Hama and finally to Salamiyya. He kept a diary that contains a wealth of observation on his family´s daily life in Salamiyya in 1915 and 1916. His diary is dated between August 11, 1915 to December 19, 1916.
