= Bagrat Grigorian =

Armenian painter (1939-1992)

- Born: March 4, 1939; Leninakan, Gyumri, Shirak Province, Armenian SSR
- Died: September 21, 1992 (aged 53); Yerevan, Armenia
- Education: Panos Terlemezian Art College and Yerevan Fine Arts Institute, Yerevan, Armenia
- Known for: Painting, drawing
- Notable work: Aspet (1976)
- Movement: Cubism, Surrealism, abstract expressionism

Bagrat Grigorian (Armenian: Բագրատ Գրիգորյան, March 4, 1939 — September 21, 1992) was an Armenian painter.

He was born in Leninakan, Gyumri in 1939. After attending Panos Terlemezian Art College, he worked under local artists H. Ananikian and S. Mirzoyan from 1957. He attended art college in Yerevan (1960–63) and obtained a degree from that city's Institute of Fine Arts and Drama in 1967. His first major solo exhibition, held in 1971, led to him being banned from exhibiting again, although he continued to participate in group exhibitions in Armenia, Estonia and France during the 1970s. Solo exhibitions in Paris and Los Angeles in the late 1970s or early 1980s led to his works being widely exhibited across Europe and in Canada, Russia, USA, Beirut and elsewhere.

After his death, forty of his works were exhibited in the National Gallery of Armenia, Yerevan. His works are held there and at the Modern Art Museum of Yerevan, the Tretyakov Gallery in Moscow and elsewhere.
