= Nerses Krikorian =

Armenian-American chemist

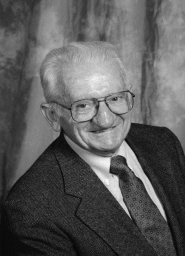
Nerses Krikorian

Nerses "Krik" Krikorian (January 1921 – April 18, 2018) was an Armenian-American chemist and intelligence officer at Los Alamos National Laboratory. He is best known for his work on high-temperature chemistry. An Armenian genocide survivor, he arrived in the U.S. at 4 and studied at Niagara University. He was involved in the Manhattan Project and by the time of his death was one of the last living scientists involved in it.

== Early life and education ==
Nerses Krikorian was born in Harput, Ottoman Empire in January 1921 to Armenian parents Hachig and Lucy Krikorian, who had married in 1919. The family survived the Armenian genocide. He had two brothers (Arthur and Mike), one born in Aleppo, Syria and the youngest one in the U.S. and a sister, Dorothy Krikorian. The family fled, first, to Greece, then France, Canada and, eventually, the United States in 1925. The family settled in Niagara Falls, New York, where his father worked in a factory, while his mother was a homemaker. His parents spoke Armenian, Turkish and Kurdish, but never fully mastered English. He grew up in Niagara Falls and initially only spoke Armenian at the insistence of his parents. He also learned Armenian history and had knowledge of his Armenian heritage.

Krikorian studied chemistry at Niagara University, a Catholic university, in 1939–43, graduating with honors.

== Career ==
In 1943 Krikorian began working at an electro-metallurgical lab in Niagara Falls under Union Carbide as a radiation chemist, working in a lab that made highly enriched uranium for the Manhattan Project. He was initially unaware of the purpose of their work. "I'd read a book somewhere that speculated that uranium was a fission thing, but I didn’t know what 'fission' meant. I'm a chemist, not a physicist," Krikorian said.

In August 1946 he moved to Los Alamos, New Mexico and joined Los Alamos National Laboratory. He began working with micrograms of highly radioactive polonium to "prepare polonium-beryllium initiators." In the mid-1950s he began working on Project Rover, a joint project between the Atomic Energy Commission and NASA, to "develop a nuclear-thermal rocket for space applications." He was responsible in ensuring that the "materials would support the rigorous demands of nuclear propulsion at high temperatures.

When Project Rover was canceled in 1972, Krikorian joined a new intelligence unit at Los Alamos National Laboratory upon the invitation of lab director Harold Agnew. He became one of the unit's six original members and its security officer. He met with representatives of the Soviet Union's nuclear research program. He was considered useful because he spoke Armenian and knew Russian. He later became Group Leader of the Critical Technologies Group of the International Technology Division. He visited some 15 Russian laboratories, including weapons design laboratories. Krikorian was "at the forefront of dialogue between the Soviets and the United States in breaking down the barriers of the Cold War."

Krikorian retired from Los Alamos National Laboratory in 1991.

Krikorian helped write the charter to govern the city of Los Alamos, New Mexico.

== Personal life and death ==
Krikorian met his wife Katherine "Pat" Patterson at Los Alamos. She was a member of the Women's Army Corps (WACs) and worked as a secretary during the Manhattan Project. They married in March 1948 and in 1951 had their only child, Debra Krikorian, who went on to become an army lieutenant colonel.

Krikorian was a founding member of the United Church of Los Alamos. He translated Armenian poetry and could recite the Rubaiyat of Omar Khayyam.

He died at his home in Los Alamos on April 18, 2018 and was buried next to his wife at Santa Fe National Cemetery.

== Publications ==
Krikorian held six patents and authored numerous papers, including 50 open publications and a number of classified intelligence assessments. His papers were concerned with everything from laser isotope separation and high-temperature reactor materials to directed-energy nuclear weapons and nuclear weapons testing. He wrote on rare earth and refractory carbides, intermetallic phase relationships, thermodynamics, crystallography, and superconductivity. He had "developed an international reputation in high-temperature chemistry."

=== Patents ===
- Bowman, M.G.; Krikorian, N.H., METHOD OF FORMING TANTALUM SILICIDE ON TANTALUM SURFACES. US3002852 - 1961-10-01
- Krikorian, N.H.; Farr, J.D.; Witteman, W.G.,METHOD OF JOINING CARBIDES TO BASE METALS. US3020632A - 1962-02-13
- Krupka, M.C.; Giorgi, A.L.; Krikorian, N.H.; Szklarz, E.G., Enhancement of superconductivity of lanthanum and yttrium sesquicarbide. US3586641A - 1971-06-22
- Krikorian, N.H.; Giorgi, A.L.; Szklarz, E.G.; Krupka, M.C., Preparation of a superconducting scandium-carbon phase. US3607056A - 1971-09-21

== Recognition ==
He was named a fellow of Los Alamos National Laboratory in 1985. He received Los Alamos Medal, the laboratory's top medal (2003) and the Intelligence Community Medallion by the CIA. He was awarded two honorary doctorates, from Niagara University (2005) and the National Academy of Sciences of Armenia (2005).

Los Alamos National Laboratory Director Terry Wallace called Krikorian "a giant of national security science. "He contributed enormously to the mission of the laboratory [...] few people have been more impactful on our history than Krik. He leaves an enduring legacy that will continue far into the future," stated Wallace.
