= Grigor Topalli =

Albanian footballer

Personal information
- Full name: Grigor Topalli
- Date of birth: 1 November 1992 (age 34)
- Place of birth: Korçë, Albania
- Position: Forward

Team information
- Current team: Keravnos Perni

Youth career
- 2009–2010: Aris Thessaloniki

Senior career*
Years	Team	Apps	(Gls)
2010–2012	Skënderbeu	6	(0)
2012–2013	Anagennisi Epanomi		
2013	Pierikos		
2013–2014	Vataniakos		
2014–2016	Episkopi		
2016	Kallithea	6	(0)
2017	Achilleas Neokaisareia		
2017	Atsaleniou		
2018	Kardias		
2018	Amvrysseas		
2019	Thesprotos		
2019-	Keravnos Perni		
- * Club domestic league appearances and goals as of 10 October 2012

Grigor Topalli (born 1 November 1992 in Korçë) is an Albanian professional footballer who currently plays for Greek lower league side Keravnos Perni as a forward.

== Club career ==
He has previously played for Aris Thessaloniki in Greece at youth level and for Skënderbeu Korçë in the Albanian Superliga.
