= James Grigor =

British botanist (1811–1848)

James Grigor (1811?–1848), was a botanist.

Grigor was the author of the ‘Eastern Arboretum, or Register of Remarkable Trees, Seats, Gardens, &c., in the County of Norfolk,’ London 18[40-]41, with fifty etched plates, issued in fifteen numbers. In the preface (dated Norwich, 1 Sept. 1841) he states that he had devoted ‘twenty years to practical botanical pursuits,’ and his work was highly praised by J. C. Loudon.

He wrote a ‘Report on Trimingham and Runton Plantations in the county of Norfolk, belonging to Sir Edward North Buxton, Baronet,’ published in the ‘Transactions’ of the Highland Agricultural Society of Scotland, x. (new ser.) 557-74, for which he earned a gold medal, and where he is described as ‘Nurseryman and Land Improver, Norwich.’ He died at Norwich, 22 April 1848, ‘about thirty-seven years old.’

== Works ==
1. The eastern arboretum
2. "On Fences", in Journal of the Royal Agricultural Society of England, Volume VI, Royal Agricultural Society of England (London).
