= Grigor Marzuantsi =

Armenian book printer and engraver

Grigor Marzuantsi (Armenian: Գրիգոր Մարզվանեցի; 1662 in Marzuan city in historical Little Hayq in Western Armenia - 1730) was an Armenian book printer and engraver during the years 1705-1730. He is credited with helping establish the Armenian printing industry.
