= Kerkorian (surname) =

Kerkorian or Kirkorian (Armenian: Քըրքորյան) is an Armenian surname derived from the given name Kirkor. Notable people with the name include:

- Gary Kerkorian (1930–2000), American football quarterback
- Kirk Kerkorian (1917–2015), American billionaire

== See also ==
- Krikorian
