= Arsen Grigoryan =

Arsen Grigoryan may refer to:

- Arsen Grigoryan (singer, born 1982), Armenian singer, actor and TV presenter
- Arsen Grigoryan (singer, born 1978), Armenian singer, composer and music producer
- Arsen Grigoryan (singer, born 1974), Armenian-born Armenian traditional songs performer
- Arsen Grigoryan (singer, born 1968), Syrian-born Armenian traditional songs performer
