= Mariam Aslamazyan =

Soviet Armenian artist (1907–2006)

Mariam Aslamazian
- Born: 20 October 1907; Alexandropol
- Died: 16 July 2006 (aged 98); Moscow

Mariam Arshaki Aslamazyan (Russian: Асламаз́ян Мариа́м Арша́ковна; Armenian: Մարիամ Ասլամազյան; 20 October 1907 – 16 July 2006) was a Soviet Armenian painter, recognized as a People's Artist of the Armenian SSR (1965) and People's Artist of the Soviet Union (1990).

Born near Alexandropol (today Gyumri), Aslamazyan has been referred to as the "Armenian Frida Kahlo" due to her depictions of traditional Armenian culture, her bright, modernist palette, eclectic personal style, and self-portraits depicting herself in traditional Armenian dress. She also enjoyed a successful career as an independent woman artist working in a male-dominated profession in the mid-twentieth-century.

Aslamazyan was the student of Stepan Aghajanian and Petrov-Vodkin and is a representative of the Armenian school of decorative-planar still life paintings and portraits, as well as an accomplished ceramicist. The saturated colors, flattened space, and decorative motifs of Aslamazyan's paintings reflect a variety of influences, including Western modernists Henri Matisse and Paul Cézanne and the earlier Armenian avant-garde which included such seminal painters as Martiros Saryan. She also painted overtly Socialist Realist work, which was required of Official artists of the day, most notably The Return of the Hero (1943) for which she was awarded the Medal "For the Defence of the Caucasus."

Aslamazyan enjoyed a successful career in the Soviet system, earning recognition through official channels. She received funding through the Artists' Union to travel to numerous countries around the world, including Algeria, Argentina, Belgium, China, German Democratic Republic (today Germany), France, India, Italy, Japan, Madagascar, Spain, Sweden, the Netherlands, United Arab Republic (today Egypt and Syria), and Yugoslavia. In 1957, the Soviet government sent her on an officially sanctioned trip to India to help to establish friendly diplomatic ties between the two countries. An exhibition was mounted at the end of her trip to showcase the paintings she'd created during her time in the country which was attended by Indira Gandhi, who also appeared in some of the paintings. This and three subsequent trips in 1970, 1973, and 1975, played a significant role in establishing positive Indo-Soviet diplomatic ties.

The Gallery of Mariam and Yeranuhi Aslamazyan Sisters, located in the sisters' hometown, holds a large collection of their works in oil and ceramic which are on permanent display. Her sister, Yeranuhi Aslamazyan, was also an artist. Aslamazyan's work is held in the National Gallery of Armenia and in the Derfner Judaica Museum.

Aslamazyan died in Moscow and was buried in Yerevan's Komitas Pantheon. In recent years, there has been a resurgence of interest in Aslamazyan's work and her paintings have been featured in contemporary exhibitions.

The importance of Mariam and Yeranuhi Aslamazyan lies not only in their art but also in their devotion to their homeland. Throughout their career, the sisters represented Armenian culture in numerous cities around the world and never stopped praising Armenia as their first and foremost inspiration in art.

In 1976, Indira Gandhi, the Prime Minister of India visited Soviet Russia and Soviet Armenia. Out of the 15 republics of the Soviet Union, Gandhi had chosen to visit Armenia partially thanks to Mariam Aslamazyan.

Both Mariam and Yeranuhi had visited India on several occasions. Prior to Gandhi's trip to Armenia, Mariam had received the Jawaharlal Nehru Award from the Indian government for a series of paintings devoted to India and had met with Gandhi. It was during that meeting when Gandhi decided to visit Armenia as well. After a reception organized for Nehru prize laureates, Gandhi approached Mariam and started to examine her traditional Armenian silver belt with curiosity.

“'What is this?’ she asked. I explained that it's a traditional garment that Armenian women pass down from generation to generation. I suggested giving it to her as a present but she refused to state that the portrait [Mariam had painted a portrait of Gandhi's father, and previous leader of India Jawaharlal Nehru] is a great present and I should keep my belt as a memory from my ancestors. Then she also told me that she is planning a trip to the Soviet Union, and wants to be in Moscow and our homeland, Armenia, about which she had heard many good things.

== Sources ==
- Pilosyan, Syuzanna (2007). Mariam Aslamazian. Amrots Publishing. ISBN 978-99941-31-49-5.
- Bown, Matthew Cullerne (1993). "Painting in the non-Russian Republics". In Art of the Soviets: Painting, Sculpture and Architecture in a One-party State, 1917-1992. Manchester University Press. ISBN 978-0719037351.
