= Helena Kirkorowa =

Polish actress (1828–1900)

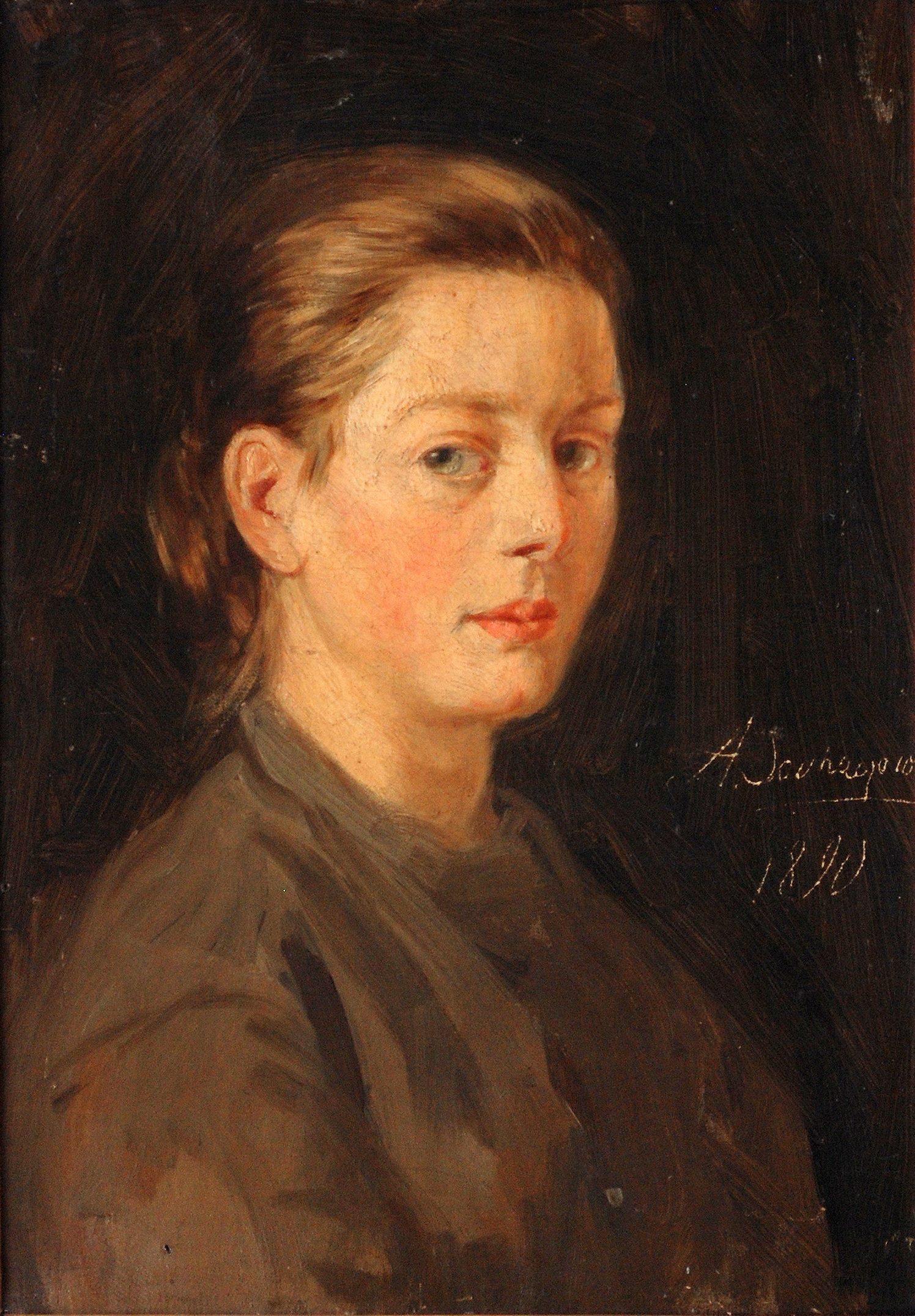
- Portrait of Kirkorowa by Aleksander Sochaczewski
- Born: Helena Petronela Majewska; May 23, 1828; Stara Wieś, Congress Poland, Russian Empire
- Died: January 5, 1900 (aged 71); Vitebsk
- Other name: Helena Piórowa
- Known for: acting, conspiracy in the January Uprising

Helena Petronela Kirkorowa née Majewska (May 28, 1828 – January 5, 1900) was a Polish actress of the Vilnius and Krakow theaters and an agent and courier of the Polish National Government during the January Uprising. She secretly housed the commander of the uprising Romuald Traugutt and managed his correspondence. For her role in the uprising, she was imprisoned in the Warsaw Citadel, then sentenced to exile and eight years of hard labor in Siberia.

During her acting career before first marriage, she was known as Petronela Majewska; after marrying the second time during her exile, she took on the surname of Piórowa.

== Early life and acting career ==
Helena was the daughter of Ignacy Majewski and Ludwika née Wierzbicka. She studied acting in Warsaw. In the years 1843–1846 she performed in Vilnius theaters, initially playing the roles of boys, then also female lovers (including Juliet in Romeo and Juliet). Thanks to her skills and beauty she was liked by the audience. After marrying the archaeologist Adam Kirkor in 1845 or 1846, she gave up acting. The couple's house was visited by many scientists and writers. Among them was Władysław Syrokomla, with whom Kirkorowa started an affair that lasted several years and which led to her leaving her husband in 1857. She then settled in Kraków with her widowed mother.

In Kraków, she started working at Juliusz Pfeiffer's theater and in February 1858 made her debut as Thisbe in the Victor Hugo play Angelo, Tyrant of Padua. Her performance was a success and from then on Kirkorowa played the main roles, including Amelia in Juliusz Słowacki's Mazepa or the titular Jadwiga in Aleksander Narcyz Przezdziecki's play. According to Karol Estreicher, her acting was characterized by "great naturalness, calmness and gradation". Together with the troupe, Kirkorowa made guest appearances in Poznań, Kalisz, Konin, Lublin, Łódź and Piotrków Trybunalski.

In the middle of 1858, Kirkorowa and Syrokomla met in Poznań, sparking a wave of rumors – Bibianna Moraczewska mentioned their rendezvous in her diary, writing about the actress as "supposedly a vixen". Soon after, the relationship broke off, which fueled the poet's depressive states lasting until his death. Kirkorowa returned to Kraków and performed on stage for another year and a half, including in the play Możnowładcy i sierota written by Syrokomla for an event in her honor. After a conflict with Pfeiffer, she resigned from performing in the Kraków theater.

== Involvement in the January Uprising ==
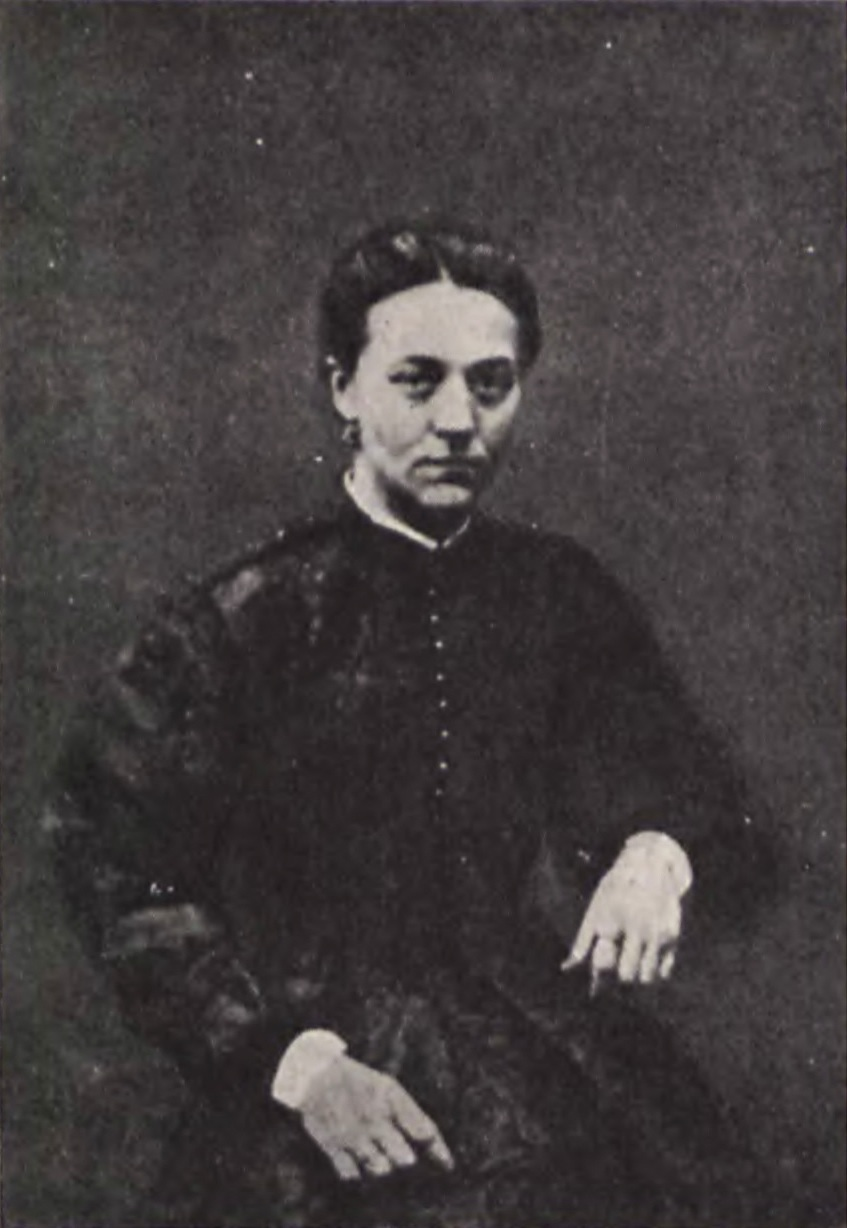
A photo of Kirkorowa

In mid-1860, the actress and her mother settled in Warsaw. However, Kirkorowa did not continue her acting career, but joined the pre-uprising patriotic movements. During the January Uprising she was a courier and an agent of the Polish National Government. She traveled to Kraków and Vilnius transporting money and documents; her apartment in Warsaw served as a clandestine meeting point. She housed co-conspirators involved in the uprising, such as Jan Koziełł-Poklewski.

From November 1, 1863, Romuald Traugutt began to hide at her place, in an apartment at Smolna Street, rented under the name of Michał Czarnecki with the express purpose of housing Traugutt. Kirkorowa organized the communication of the commander of the uprising, passing correspondence and orders through women couriers. After Traugutt was arrested on the night of April 10, 1864, Kirkorowa was not arrested immediately and thus managed to pass on some of the remaining documents. Arrested a day later, she made a misstep by sending a secret message to her mother asking her to warn people connected to her, which was intercepted by the investigators, as a result of which her mother and one of the female couriers were detained, and the case of Kirkorowa was added to the trial of Traugutt and other members of the National Government. After the investigation was completed, she was imprisoned in the Warsaw Citadel.

== Exile in Siberia ==
On July 29, 1864, Kirkorowa was sentenced by the military court to exile in Siberia and stripped of all rights (her mother had been released earlier and placed under police supervision), and on July 30, eight years of hard labor were added to the sentence. On August 10, she was deported to Siberia, where she served her sentence in the salt works of Usolye-Sibirskoye. After the amnesties of 1866 and 1867 she settled in Irkutsk, where she unsuccessfully tried to return to acting.

In Irkutsk, she met and married a fellow exile Antoni Pióro-Dębiński (her first husband obtained a divorce shortly after she was deported to Siberia). After serving their sentence, the couple settled near Mogilev. Widowed, Helena moved to Vitebsk, where she died on January 5, 1900.
