= List of Theta Delta Chi members =

This is a list of notable members of the Theta Delta Chi fraternity. Names are listed, followed by the school attended and the graduation year.

== Academia ==
- Carlos Baker, Dartmouth 1932, professor of literature at Princeton University
- Herbert E. Bolton, Wisconsin 1895, chair of the history department at University of California, Berkeley
- Chauncey S. Boucher, Michigan 1909, president of University of West Virginia and chancellor of the University of Nebraska
- William Henry Brewer, Yale 1889, Botanist, chair of agriculture at Yale University
- Elmer H. Capen, Tufts 1860, president of Tufts University
- Samuel P. Capen, Tufts 1898, president of the University of Buffalo
- Leonard Carmichael, Tufts 1921, president of Tufts University, Secretary of Smithsonian
- Alvin D. Chandler, William and Mary 1922, president of College of William and Mary
- Henry Crampton, CCNY 1893, paleontologist and evolutionary biologist; professor at Columbia University and Barnard College
- Edmund Ezra Day, Dartmouth 1905, president of Cornell University
- Robert E. Doherty, Illinois 1909, president of Carnegie Mellon University
- Guy S. Ford, Wisconsin 1895, president of University of Minnesota
- Richard M. Freeland, Amherst 1963, president of Northeastern University
- Julian Gibbs, Amherst 1946, president of Amherst College
- Hollis Godfrey, Tufts 1895, president of Drexel University
- Frederick W. Hamilton, Tufts 1880, president of Tufts University
- William Leslie Hooper, Tufts 1877, acting president of Tufts University
- Francis H. Horn, Dartmouth 1930, president of the University of Rhode Island
- Ernest W. Huffcut, Cornell 1884, dean of Cornell Law School
- Alexander Meiklejohn, Brown 1893, president of Amherst College
- Erwin Schell, MIT 1912, dean of MIT Department of Business and Engineering
- Lester C. Thurow, Williams 1960, dean of the MIT Sloan School of Management
- Charles C. Tillinghast Jr., Brown 1932, president of Trans World Airlines, chancellor of Brown University
- Norman Topping, Washington 1930, chancellor of the University of Southern California

== Architecture ==
- John William Merrow, Dartmouth 1897, architect
- Raymond Hood, Brown 1902, Rockefeller Center and Chicago Tribune, architect

== Business ==
- Michael Burns, Arizona State 1980, vice chairman of Lionsgate
- Tom First, Brown 1989, co-founder of Nantucket Nectars
- Peter Diamandis, MIT 1983, founder and chairman of the XPRIZE Foundation and the cofounder and executive chairman of Singularity University
- Charles K. Fletcher Jr., Stanford 1950, chairman of the Home Federal Savings Association
- Dwight Follett, Illinois 1925, president of Follett Corporation
- Harvey Dow Gibson, Bowdoin 1902, president of the Manufacturers Trust Company
- Eugene Grace, Lehigh 1899, president and chairman of Bethlehem Steel
- Samer Hamadeh, Stanford 1991, co-founder of Vault.com
- William J. Henry, William and Mary 1963, president of Time Life Books
- Howard Melville Hanna, Union 1859, president of M. A. Hanna Company and Globe Iron Works
- Eric Johnston, Washington 1917, president of the United States Chamber of Commerce
- Mark H. McCormack, William and Mary 1950, CEO of International Management Group
- Michael J. Saylor, MIT 1987, founder and executive chairman of MicroStrategy
- Tom Scott, Brown 1989, co-founder of Nantucket Nectars
- Charles Hook Tompkins, George Washington 1906, founder of Charles H. Tompkins Construction Company

== Entertainment ==
- Kary Antholis, Bowdoin 1984, documentary producer
- Pat Ballard, Penn 1922, composer of the song "Mr. Sandman"
- John Brougham, New York Graduate 1857, 19th century actor, dramatist, and orator
- John Dunning, UCLA 1939, film editor, Academy Award winner for Ben Hur
- Charles Esten, William and Mary 1987, actor and comedian known for Whose Line Is It Anyway?
- Norman H. Hackett, Michigan 1898, actor
- Arthur Hornblow Jr., Dartmouth 1915, film producer
- Eric Johnston, Washington 1917, president of the Motion Picture Association of America
- Gardner McKay, Cornell 1953, actor and drama critic
- Hasan Piker, Rutgers 2013, political commentator
- Sendhil Ramamurthy, Tufts 1996, actor known for Heroes
- Frank Thomas, Stanford 1933, one of Walt Disney's leading team of animators
- James Woods, MIT 1969, actor

== Law ==
- Hosea M. Knowlton, Tufts 1867, chief prosecutor in Lizzie Borden case, Attorney General of Massachusetts
- William F. Love, Rochester 1903, New York Supreme Court justice
- John Bayard McPherson, Princeton 1866, judge of the US Court of Appeals
- Harlan W. Rippey, Rochester 1898, US District Court judge, New York Court of Appeals judge
- Hugh Rodham, Penn State 1972, public defender and brother of Hillary Clinton
- Earle S. Warner, Hobart 1902, New York Supreme Court justice

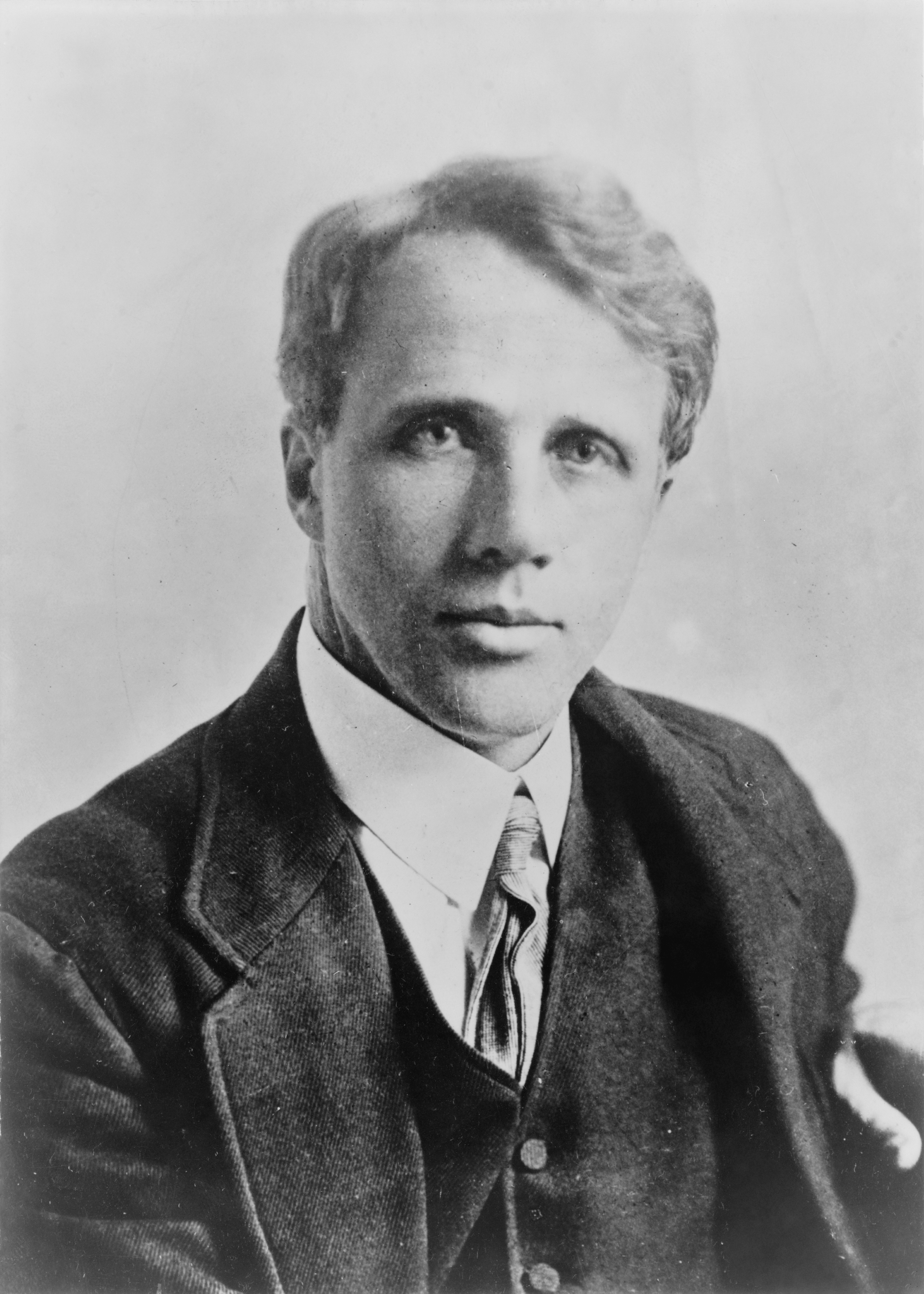
Robert Frost, Dartmouth 1896.

== Literature ==
- Frank E. Compton, Wisconsin 1898, creator of Compton's Encyclopedia
- Joseph J. Ellis, William and Mary 1965, author Founding Brothers, American Sphinx, His Excellency
- Robert Frost, Dartmouth 1896, four time winner of the Pulitzer Prize for Poetry
- Tad Mosel, Amherst 1944, playwright, winner of the Pulitzer Prize for Drama for All the Way Home
- John Nichols, Hamilton 1962, author known for The Milagro Beanfield War and The Sterile Cuckoo
- Fitz James O'Brien, New York Graduate 1857, New York literary bohemian, science fiction pioneer
- William Leete Stone Jr., Brown 1858, historical writer and journalist
- William Wilson Talcott, Michigan 1901, publisher of the Englewood Economist; business manager of the Paris edition of the Chicago Tribune
- Thomas Thackeray Swinburne, University of Rochester 1892, poet
- Alexander Woollcott, Hamilton 1896, drama critic of The New York Times, New YorkHerald Tribune, and The Sun

== Medicine ==
- Park Dietz, Cornell 1970, forensic psychologist
- Frank Lahey, Harvard 1904, founder of the Lahey Clinic

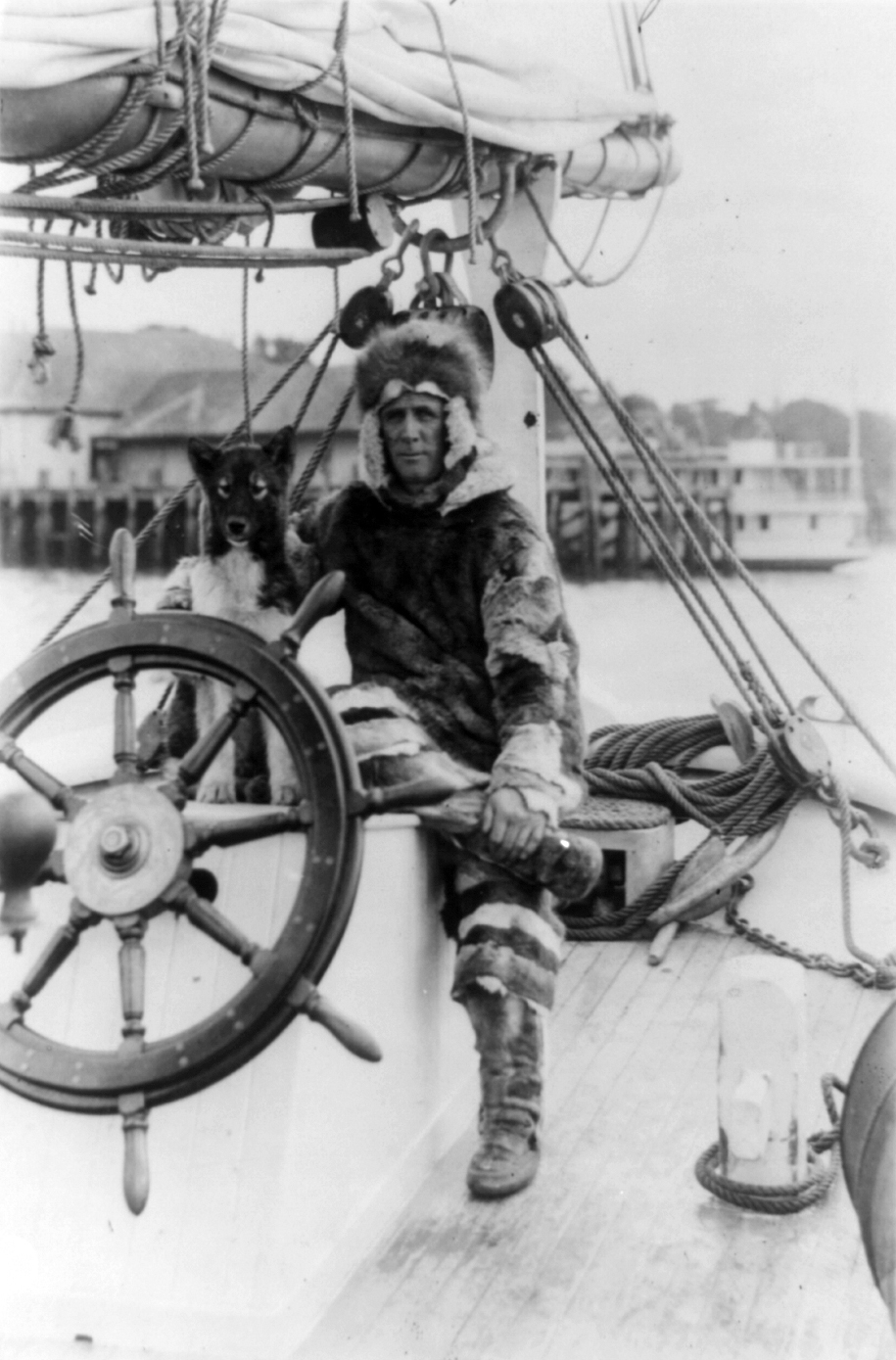
Donald B. MacMillan, Bowdoin 1897

== Military ==
- Raymond W. Bliss, Tufts 1910, former Surgeon General of the United States Army
- John W. Cudmore, Toronto 1958, surgeon and United States Army major general
- Silas B. Hays, Iowa State 1924, Surgeon General of the United States Army
- Arthur Japy Hepburn, Dickinson 1896, Admiral Commander in Chief of the United States Fleet
- William Lamb, William and Mary 1853, Civil War "Hero of Fort Fisher"
- Benjamin P. Lamberton, Dickinson 1862,United States Navy admiral
- Donald B. MacMillan, Bowdoin 1897, Arctic explorer, United States Navy rear admiral
- Robert Lee Scott Jr., Arizona State 1932, United States Air Force brigadier general
- Franklin Guest Smith, Rensselaer Polytechnic Institute 1859, United States Army brigadier general
- Eben Swift, Dickinson 1874, United States Army major general
- Henry Goddard Thomas, Bowdoin 1858, United States Army brigadier general; first regular officer to command United States Colored Troops

== Politics ==
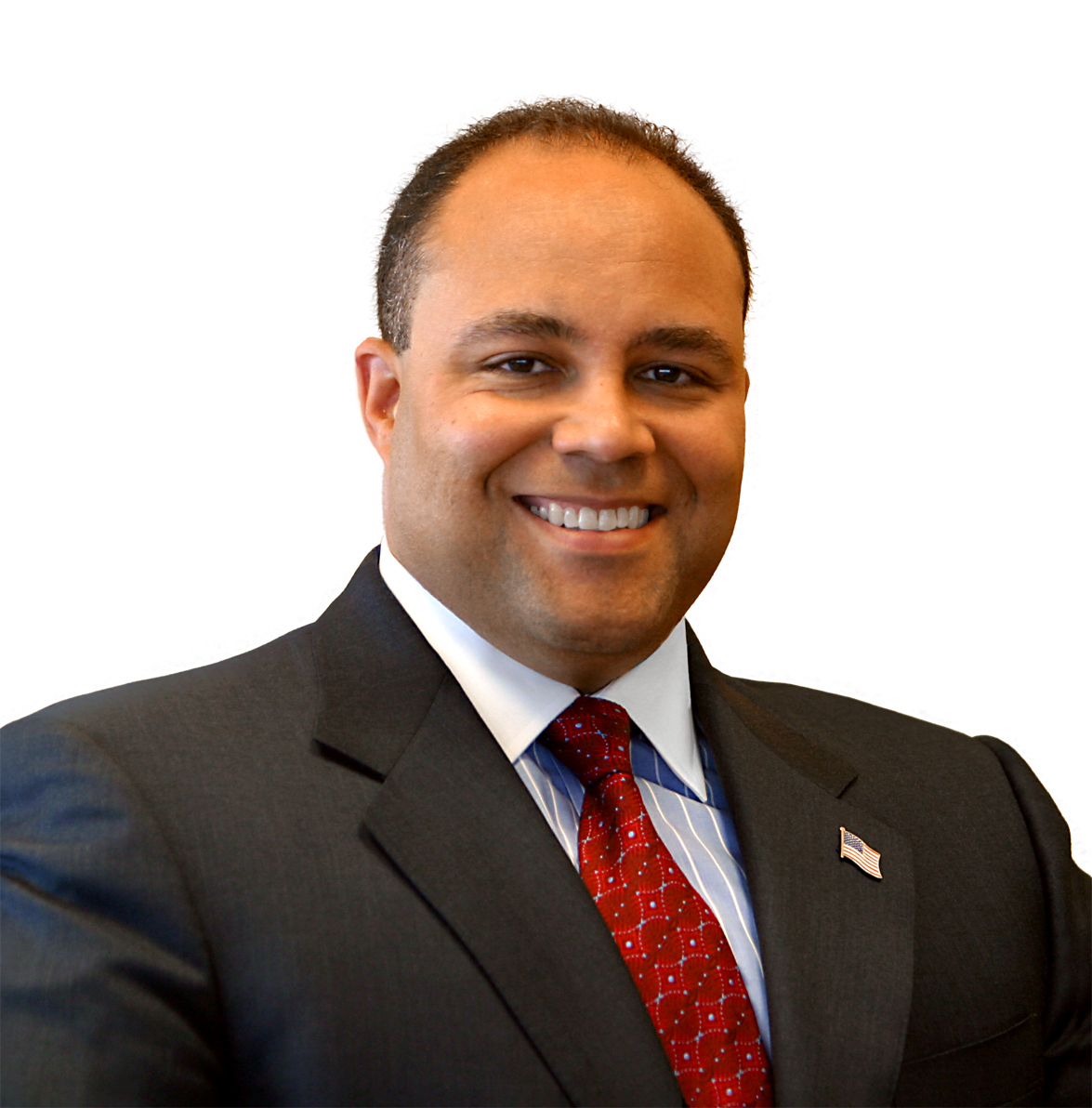
Michael Powell, William and Mary '85

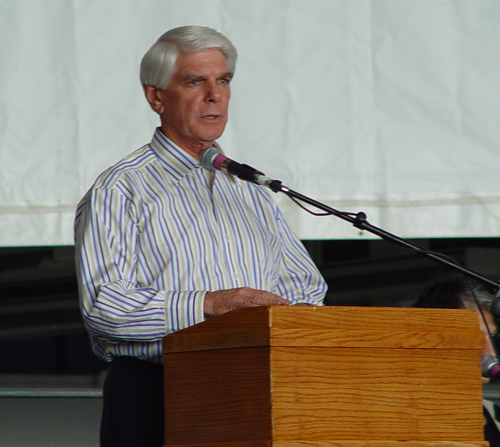
Jerry Lewis, UCLA '56,

- M. D. Ball, College of William and Mary 1854, Virginia House of Delegates and United States Attorney for the District of Alaska
- John H. Bartlett, Dartmouth 1894, Governor of New Hampshire
- Allen Beach, Union 1849, Lieutenant Governor of New York, Secretary of State of New York
- Louis P. Beaubien, McGill 1925, Senate of Canada from Quebec
- John D. Bellamy, Virginia 1875, United States House of Representatives
- Joseph B. Benedetti, William and Mary 1951, Virginia Senate and Virginia House of Delegates
- Alvin Morell Bentley, Michigan 1940, United States House of Representatives
- William D. Bloxham, William and Mary 1854, Governor of Florida
- Frederick G. Bromberg, Harvard 1858, United States House of Representatives, Alabama Senate
- John Hay, Brown 1858, United States Secretary of State, United States Ambassador to the United Kingdom
- Frank H. Buck, Berkeley 1907, United States House of Representatives
- Arthur W. Coolidge, Tufts 1903, Lieutenant Governor of Massachusetts, President of the Massachusetts Senate, Massachusetts House of Representatives
- Maurice E. Crumpacker, United States House of Representatives
- John Alden Dix, Cornell 1883, Governor of New York
- Nathan F. Dixon III, Brown 1869, United States Senate, United States House of Representatives, Rhode Island Senate, United States Attorney for the District of Rhode Island
- Lane Dwinell, Dartmouth 1928, Governor of New Hampshire, Assistant Secretary of State for Administration
- Allen J. Furlow, Michigan 1916, United States House of Representatives
- Joseph I. France, Hamilton 1895, United States Senate, Maryland Senate
- Henry R. Gibson, Hobart 1862, United States House of Representatives, Tennessee House of Representatives, Tennessee Senate
- Stanton Griffis, Cornell 1910, United States Ambassador to Spain, United States Ambassador to Argentina, United States Ambassador to Egypt, United States Ambassador to Poland
- John W. Griggs, Lafayette 1868, Governor of New Jersey, United States Attorney General, New Jersey Senate
- James A. Hamilton, Rochester 1898, Secretary of State of New York, New York State Senate
- Irving Ives, Hamilton 1919, United States Senate, Speaker of the New York State Assembly
- Thomas B. Kyle, Dartmouth 1880, United States House of Representatives
- Robert Leggett, Berkeley 1948, United States House of Representatives, California State Assembly
- Jerry Lewis, UCLA 1956, United States House of Representatives, California Assembly
- Daniel N. Lockwood, Union 1865, United States House of Representatives, United States Attorney for the Northern District of New York
- Daniel J. McGillicuddy, Bowdoin 1881, United States House of Representatives and Mayor of Lewiston, Maine
- James McLachlan, Hamilton 1878, United States House of Representatives and Los Angeles County District Attorney
- Philleo Nash, Wisconsin 1932, Lieutenant Governor of Wisconsin and Commissioner of Indian Affairs
- John C. Nicholls, William and Mary 1853, United States House of Representatives
- Thomas R. Pickering, Bowdoin 1953, U.S. Ambassador to the United Nations
- Michael K. Powell, William and Mary 1985, Chairman of the Federal Communications Commission
- Gonzalo de Quesada y Aróstegui, CCNY 1888, architect of Cuban Independence Movement, Cuban Ambassador to the United States
- Bruce Rauner, Dartmouth 1978, Governor of Illinois
- Rollin B. Sanford, Tufts 1897, United States House of Representatives
- Herman T. Schneebeli, Dartmouth 1930, United States House of Representatives
- Clement Hall Sinnickson, Union 1855, United States House of Representatives
- Henry P. Smith III, Dartmouth 1933, United States House of Representatives and Mayor of North Tonawanda
- Henry J. Spooner, Brown 1860, United States House of Representatives and Rhode Island House of Representatives
- Frederick C. Stevens, Bowdoin 1881, United States House of Representatives
- Walter R. Stiness, Brown 1877, United States House of Representatives and Rhode Island House of Representatives
- William W. Thomas Jr., Bowdoin 1860, American Minister to Sweden
- John W. Tuthill, William and Mary 1932, United States Ambassador to Brazil and United States Ambassador to the Organisation for Economic Co-operation and Development
- Wesley C. Uhlman, Washington 1956, Mayor of Seattle, Washington Senate, and Washington House of Representatives

== Religion ==
- John Henry Ducachet Wingfield, William and Mary 1853, Bishop of Northern California
- Alfred Magill Randolph, William and Mary 1855, Bishop of Southern Virginia
- David Gregg, Washington and Jefferson 1865, Presbyterian clergyman, pastor of Park Street Church
- Franklin Clark Fry, Hamilton 1921, President of the Lutheran Church of America
- Robert C. Rusack, Hobart 1947, Bishop of Los Angeles

== Science and engineering ==
- Stephen M. Babcock, Tufts 1886, inventor of the Babcock centrifuge (butterfat testing)
- Frederick Vernon Coville, Cornell 1887, botanist and founder of the United States National Arboretum
- Dan Geer, MIT 1972, computer security specialist
- Alexander Lyman Holley, Brown 1853, mechanical engineer and industrial designer
- Henry Christopher McCook, Washington and Jefferson 1859, naturalist and author

== Sports ==
=== Baseball ===
- John W. Allyn, Lafayette 1939, owner of Chicago White Sox
- Jeffrey L. Ballard, Stanford 1982, baseball player for the Baltimore Orioles
- John Brody, Tufts 1995, Major League Baseball senior vice-president of corporate sales and marketing
- Harry Dalton, Amherst 1950, executive vice president of the Milwaukee Brewers
- William F. McAfee, Jr., Michigan 1929, professional baseball player with the Chicago White Sox
- Walter Francis O'Malley, Pennsylvania 1926, owner of Brooklyn Dodgers and Los Angeles Dodgers
- Wally Snell, Brown 1913, professional baseball player with the Boston Red Sox

=== Football ===
- Zak DeOssie, Brown 2007, professional football player with the New York Giants
- Chas Gessner, Brown 2003, professional football player with the New England Patriots and the Tampa Bay Buccaneers
- Jackson Keefer, Brown 1925, All-American 1924, 1925, professional football player with the Providence Steam Roller and the Dayton Triangles
- James Lofton, Stanford 1978, professional football player and Pro Football Hall of Fame inductee
- Sean Morey, Brown 1999, professional football player for the New England Patriots, Philadelphia Eagles, Pittsburgh Steelers, and the Arizona Cardinals
- Chuck Muncie, Berkeley 1975, professional football player New Orleans Saints and San Diego Chargers
- Darrin Nelson, Stanford 1981, professional football player with Minnesota Vikings
- Garin Veris, Stanford 1985, professional football player with the New England Patriots and San Francisco 49ers

=== Olympians ===
- Ned Gillette, Dartmouth 1967, Olympic skier and explorer
- Edward Lindberg, Tufts 1909, gold and bronze medalist at the 1912 Olympics - track
- Edward Marsh, Lehigh 1894, gold medalist at the 1900 Olympics – rowing
- John Steel Hagenbuch, Dartmouth 2027, Olympic cross-country skier
- Leon Tuck, Dartmouth 1915, silver medalist 1920 Olympics – hockey

=== Other sports ===
- Benjamin L. Abruzzo, Illinois 1952, crewmember of Double Eagle II (first trans-Atlantic balloon flight)
- Donald Canham, Michigan 1941, University of Michigan athletic director
- Mark Donohue, Brown 1959, racing driver and Indianapolis 500 winner
- William P. Ficker, Berkeley 1950, competitive sailer, America's Cup Race winner
- Harold A. Fisher, CCNY 1902, College Basketball Hall of Fame member, author of first college basketball rules
- Ben Harburg, Tufts 2006, owner of Al-Kholood Club and Cádiz CF
- Alex Magleby, Dartmouth 2000, professional rugby player; coach, co-founder, and co-owner of the New England Free Jacks
- Nick Thompson, Wisconsin 2004, Mixed martial arts fighter
