= Gregg (surname) =

Gregg and Greg are surnames of English or Scottish origin. In England, they are variant forms of the surname Gregory. The surnames are first recorded as Gregge in 1234, within the Liber feodorum, a document compiled in the reign of Henry II of England. Another early instance of the name is Gregge, recorded in 1306, within the Feet of Fines (for Essex); and as Greggez in 1504, within the Register of the Freemen of the City of York.

Gregg is also a Scottish surname, a shorthand variant of the Highland Clan Gregor or MacGregor.

== People with the surname Gregg ==
- Alan Gregg (physician) (1890–1957), American physician and Rockefeller Foundation officer
- Alan Gregg (musician), New Zealand musician
- Alexander W. Gregg (1855–1919), U.S. Representative from Texas
- Allan Gregg (born 1952), Canadian political advisor and pundit
- Andrew Gregg (1755–1835), U.S. Representative and Senator from Pennsylvania
- Avani Gregg (born 2002), American internet celebrity, actor, and make-up artist
- Clark Gregg (born 1962), film and television actor and writer
- David Gregg (disambiguation), multiple people
- Donald P. Gregg (born 1927), U.S. Ambassador to South Korea (1989–1993)
- Donald Gregg (cricketer) (1924–2012), Australian cricketer
- Eric Gregg (1951–2006), Major League Baseball umpire (1975–1999)
- Forrest Gregg (1933–2019), American football player and coach
- Gail Gregg (1951- ), American artist, photographer, and journalist
- Harry Gregg (1932–2020), professional football player who played for Northern Ireland and Manchester United, and is a survivor of the Munich air disaster.
- Hugh Gregg (1917–2003), governor from New Hampshire
- James M. Gregg (1806–1869), U.S. Representative from Indiana
- John Gregg (Texas politician) (1828–1864), American Civil War Confederate general
- John Irvin Gregg (1826–1892), American Civil War Union commander, cousin of David Gregg
- John Robert Gregg (1867–1948), the creator of the eponymous shorthand system Gregg Shorthand
- Judd Gregg (born 1947), governor and U.S. Senator from New Hampshire
- Julie Gregg (1937–2016), American actress
- Justin Gregg, Canadian science writer
- Maxcy Gregg (1814–1862), American Civil War Confederate general
- Milton Fowler Gregg (1892–1978), Canadian First World War Victoria Cross recipient and Member of Canadian Parliamenter
- Paul Gregg (born 1941), English multi-millionaire businessman
- Randy Gregg (ice hockey) (born 1956), former Canadian ice hockey player
- Randy Gregg (musician) (born 1969), American hard rock musician
- Richard Bartlett Gregg (1885–1974), American philosopher, pacifist, and friend of Mahatma Gandhi
- Stacey Gregg, British actress
- Stacy Gregg (born 1968), New Zealand author and screenwriter
- Tommy Gregg (born 1963), Major League Baseball player
- Troy Leon Gregg (1948–1980), convicted murderer, first death sentence to be upheld by Supreme Court after Furman v. Georgia and first inmate to successfully escape Georgia's death row
  - Gregg v. Georgia
- Virginia Gregg (1916–1986), American film and television actress
- William Gregg (industrialist) (1800–1867), Founder of the pioneer Graniteville, South Carolina textile mill
- William Gregg (VC) (1890–1962), British First World War Victoria Cross recipient

== People with the surname Greg ==
- Percy Greg (1836–1889), English writer, son of William Rathbone Greg
- Robert Hyde Greg (1795–1875), English industrialist and economist
- Samuel Greg (1758–1834), English entrepreneur
- Samuel Greg (junior) (1804–1876), English industrialist and philanthropist, son of Samuel Greg
- W. W. Greg (1875–1959), English bibliographer and Shakespeare scholar
- Robert Greg (1876–1953), British diplomat
- William Rathbone Greg (1809–1881), English essayist

== Fictional characters ==
- Bentley Gregg, from Bachelor Father

== See also ==
- Greg (disambiguation)
- Gregg (disambiguation)
