= Gregg =

Gregg may refer to:

== People ==
- Gregg (given name), including a list of people with the given name
- Gregg (surname), including a list of people with the surname

== Places ==
- Gregg, Missouri, U.S.
- Gregg County, Texas, U.S.
- Gregg River, Alberta, Canada
- Gregg Seamount, one of the New England Seamounts in the Atlantic Ocean
- Gregg Township (disambiguation), three townships in the United States

== Other uses ==
- Gregg shorthand, a system of shorthand named after creator John Robert Gregg

== See also ==
- Greggs (disambiguation)
- Gregg v. Georgia, a 1976 U.S. Supreme Court decision
- Gregg v Scott, an English tort law case
