= Andrew Leete Stone =

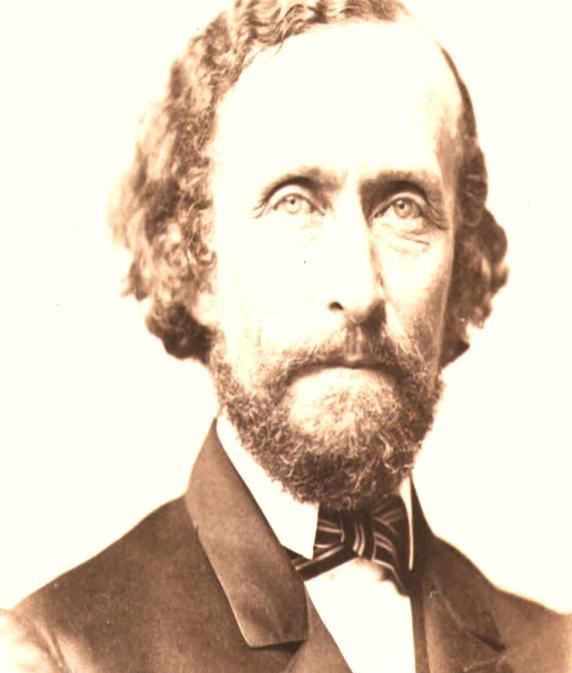
Andrew L. Stone

Andrew Leete Stone (November 25, 1815 – January 16, 1892) was an author, Civil War chaplain, and pastor of Park Street Church in Boston, Massachusetts, USA.

Stone was born in Oxford, Connecticut, in 1815 and graduated from Yale College in 1837. On July 14, 1842, Stone married Matilda Bertody Fisher of New York City. For three years, he served as a professor in the New York Institution for the Instruction of the Deaf and Dumb. Stone studied theology at Union Theological Seminary and became a Congregational clergyman. He resided in Middletown, Connecticut and then moved to Boston to become pastor of Park Street Church in January 1849. In 1856-57 Stone invited evangelist, Charles Finney to preach at Park Street. After Finney preached, Stone proclaimed publicly that he had experienced a spiritual rebirth due to Finney's preaching, causing a stir around Boston and setting off a citywide revival. Stone received an honorary Doctor of Sacred Theology (S.T.D.) from Amherst College in 1861. During the Civil War, Stone served as a chaplain for the 45th Regiment Massachusetts Volunteer Infantry. He remained as pastor of Park Street until the spring of 1866. He then moved to San Francisco, California, where he served as pastor of San Francisco's First Congregational Church for twenty-five years, until his death in 1892. He was the author of "Service the End of Living," and several other works. Stone had six children and died in San Francisco, California in 1892.

== Works ==
- Service, the end of living [microform]. Delivered at the anniversary of the "Boston Young Men's Christian Association," Monday evening, May 24, 1858 (1858)
- A discourse occasioned by the death of Abraham Lincoln: who was assassinated in Washington, Friday, April 14, 1865. Preached in the Park Street Church, Boston, on the next Lord's day (1865)
- Memorial discourses by Andrew Leete Stone (H. Hoyt, 1866)
- Leaves from a Finished Pastorate by Andrew Leete Stone (1882)
