= Greggs (disambiguation) =

Greggs is a British bakery chain.

Greggs may also refer to:

- Gregg's (New Zealand), food and beverage company
- Gregg's Restaurants & Taverns, American restaurant chain
- Alex Greggs (fl. from 2009), Canadian songwriter, record producer, and remixer
- Kima Greggs, fictional character on The Wire
- Tom Greggs (born 1980), British theologian

== See also ==
- Gregg (disambiguation)
