= Legends of Valhalla: Thor =

- Directed by: Oskar Jonasson; Toby Genkel; Gunnar Karlsson
- Written by: Friðrik Erlingsson
- Produced by: Hilmar Sigurdsson; Arnar Thorisson
- Starring: Justin Gregg; Paul Tylak; Nicola Coughlan; Liz Lloyd; Alan Stanford; Emmett J. Scanlan; J. Drew Lucas; Mary Murray; Lesa Thurman; Gary Hetzler; Hillary Kavanagh
- Edited by: Elísabet Ronaldsdóttir
- Music by: Stephen McKeon
- Production companies: CAOZ; Ulysses Filmproduktion; Magma Films; Studio Rakete
- Distributed by: Telepool (Worldwide sales); Sena (Iceland); Koch Media (Germany); ARC Entertainment (United States)
- Release date: October 14, 2011
- Running time: 79 minutes
- Countries: Iceland; Germany; Ireland
- Languages: Icelandic; English; German

Legends of Valhalla: Thor (Icelandic: Hetjur Valhallar - Þór), also known as Thor: Legend of the Magical Hammer, is a 2011 animated comedy film co-produced by CAOZ, Ulysses and Magma Films. It is an international co-production between Iceland, Germany, and Ireland, and is based on stories about Thor, the god of thunder from Norse mythology. The film is the first full-length animated film to be produced in Iceland, with animation by CAOZ in Reykjavík and rendering, lighting, and compositing done by Studio Rakete in Hamburg. It was released on October 14, 2011, in Icelandic cinemas.

The film was released on DVD in North America on March 19, 2013 by ARC Entertainment.

== Plot ==
The young blacksmith Thor lives happily with his single mother in a peaceful little village. The legend says he is the son of Odin, the King of the Gods. Therefore, the fellow villagers believe that the terrifying Giants will never attack them. But they are terribly mistaken. A Giant army crushes the village and takes the villagers to Hel, the Queen of the Underworld. Thor is knocked out and left behind. He sets out to save his friends with the hammer Crusher - who claims to be a magical weapon!

== Cast ==
- Justin Gregg as Thor
- Paul Tylak as Crusher and Heimdall
- Nicola Coughlan as Edda
- Liz Lloyd as Hel
- Alan Stanford as Odin
- Emmett J Scanlan as Sindri
- J. Drew Lucas as Thrym
- Mary Murray as Freyja
- Lesa Thurman as Mother
- Gary Hetzler as Grandfather
- Hillary Kavanagh as Old Age
