= David Gregg =

David Gregg may refer to:

- David Gregg (minister) (1846–1919), American minister and author
- David L. Gregg (1819–1868), American diplomat and politician
- David McMurtrie Gregg (1833–1916), farmer, diplomat and Union cavalry general in the American Civil War
- David Paul Gregg (1923–2001), inventor of the optical disc
- David Gregg (1767-1828), great-grandfather of president Harry S. Truman
