= Gordon Hugenberger =

American pastor (born 1948)

Gordon P. Hugenberger
- Born: October 6, 1948 (age 78); Boston, Massachusetts
- Occupations: Pastor, theologian, professor
- Spouse: Jane Schmidtchen (1971-present)
- Children: Nathan, Joel, Noah, Esther

Academic background
- Education: Harvard University; Gordon-Conwell Theological Seminary; University of Gloucestershire; Oxford Centre for Hebrew and Jewish Studies
- Doctoral advisor: Gordon J. Wenham

Academic work
- Era: 20th and 21st Century
- Institutions: Gordon-Conwell Theological Seminary; Park Street Church, in Boston, Massachusetts
- Notable works: Marriage as a Covenant: A Study of Biblical Law and Ethics Governing Marriage, Developed from the Perspective of Malachi

Gordon Paul Hugenberger (born October 6, 1948) was the senior pastor at historic Park Street Church, in Boston, Massachusetts (1997–2017). He announced on June 5, 2016 that he would leave that position by the end of June, 2017. He was born in Wellesley, Massachusetts, one of seven children. While working at a Salvation Army camp as a high schooler, he had a conversion experience and began to follow Jesus Christ as his Lord and Savior.

== Education ==
Hugenberger received his Bachelor of Arts summa cum laude in engineering and applied physics from Harvard University and he also received the 1974 President's Award (for highest GPA). He earned a Master of Divinity degree from Gordon-Conwell Theological Seminary in South Hamilton, Massachusetts. He did his PhD at the College of St. Paul and St. Mary, which is today the University of Gloucestershire, in Cheltenham, England. He also studied at the Oxford Centre for Postgraduate Hebrew Studies, which is today known as the Oxford Centre for Hebrew and Jewish Studies, in Oxford, England.

Hugenberger's mentor in seminary was Old Testament scholar and Biblical Theologian, Meredith G. Kline; Hugenberger remained an enthusiastic defender of many of Kline's ideas throughout his career and extended them into other areas of biblical interpretation. Hugenberger's doctoral supervisor was British Pentateuch scholar Gordon J. Wenham.

== Scholarship and career ==
Hugenberger has served on the full-time and adjunct faculty of Gordon-Conwell Theological Seminary since 1974. He is currently a Ranked Adjunct Professor of Old Testament at the seminary. He also served as pastor of the Lanesville Congregational Church in Gloucester, Massachusetts from 1974-1997. Between 1997 and 2017, he served as the senior minister of Park Street Church. His scholarly interests include Hebrew grammar, Old Testament law and ethics, and Biblical theology. Dr. Hugenberger also regularly teaches various courses through Gordon-Conwell Theological Seminary, including "Exegesis in Judges", "Theology of the Pentateuch", and "Christ in the Old Testament". He served on the Translation Review Board for the English Standard Version (ESV) of the Bible, and he is currently writing a commentary on the Book of Judges in the Apollos Old Testament Commentary series. An expansion of his doctoral thesis ("Marriage as a Covenant: A study of Old Testament laws and ethics governing marriage developed from the perspective of Malachi") was published in 1994 by E.J. Brill & Co. as Marriage as a Covenant (reprinted in 1998 by Baker Book House).

Based on his published research on marriage in the Bible, Hugenberger claims that sexual intimacy is intended by God to function exclusively within marriage as a covenant-ratifying and renewing act. It solemnly depicts the one-flesh bond that is definitional of marriage (Genesis 2:24), and it commits the couple before God, whether they are aware of it or not, to love each other as a part of their own body. With respect to questions about homosexuality, Hugenberger has published an extensive statement of his views, "Questions and Answers on Issues Related to Homosexuality and Same-Sex Marriage." In his sermons on the topic, Hugenberger stresses that it should be the hallmark of Christians to be far more offended by their own sins than they are by anyone else's and that the Bible gives no support for homophobia, hatred, self-righteousness, prejudice, or bigotry: immorality that is homosexual is no worse, and it is no better than immorality that is heterosexual. He concludes from the Bible, "We have a Lord who loves us, everyone of us, just as we are. We also have a Lord who loves us too much to leave us as we are."

Dr. Hugenberger has also published the book "The Lord's Prayer: A Guide for the Perplexed" (Park Street Church, 1999), and numerous articles in journals such as the Journal of the Evangelical Theological Society and the Southern Medical Journal. Some of the more notable ones are on 1Tim. 2:8-15 (on women in leadership), Typology, and the Servant of the Lord in the Servant Songs of Isaiah. He has also published a number of encyclopedia articles on the Old Testament in The International Standard Bible Encyclopedia, Revised (William B. Eerdman’s Publishing Company, 1986 and 1988) and The New Bible Commentary 21st Century Edition (InterVarsity Press, 1994). Dr. Hugenberger has also contributed in a variety of ways, including the introduction and study notes for Malachi in the English Standard Version Study Bible (Crossway, 2011), various articles for the Basics of Biblical Hebrew Grammar (Gary D. Pratico and Miles V. Van Pelt, Zondervan, 2001), and reviewing the translation of Malachi for the English Standard Version of the Bible (Crossway, 2011).

In another area of differences of opinion, Hugenberger preached a series of sermons on science and creation in November 2007 through February 2008 in which he defends both a positive view of modern science and the framework interpretation of Genesis 1. Gordon has articulated that while he has held on to many different positions on how to properly interpret Genesis 1, he favors a 'Days in Heaven' view.

Hugenberger lived in Boston with his wife Jane during his tenure in the Park Street Church pulpit; they have four adult children.

== Works ==
=== Books ===
- Hugenberger, Gordon P. (1994). Marriage as a Covenant: a study of biblical law and ethics governing marriage, developed from the perspective of Malachi. Supplements to Vetus Testamentum. Vol. 52. Leiden; New York: E.J. Brill. ISBN 9789004099777. OCLC 29219893.
- ——— (1998). Marriage as a Covenant: biblical law and ethics as developed from Malachi. Biblical Studies Library. Grand Rapids, MI: Baker Books. ISBN 978-0-801-02192-3. OCLC 39700415. - re-publication of the Brill title.
- ——— (1999). The Lord's Prayer: a guide for the perplexed. Boston, MA: Park Street Church. OCLC 44925228.
- ———; Herman, Bruce Whitney (1999). Portraits of our Redemption: the Lanesville mural cycle. Wenham, MA: Gordon College. OCLC 64386873.

=== Chapters ===
- ——— (1995). "The Servant of the Lord in the "Servant Songs" of Isaiah: a second Moses figure". In Satterthwaite, Philip E.; Hess, Richard S.; Wenham, Gordon J. (eds.). The Lord's Anointed: interpretation of Old Testament Messianic texts. Tyndale House Studies. Carlisle, Cumbria; Grand Rapids, MI: Paternoster Press; Baker Books. pp. 105–140. ISBN 978-0-853-64685-3. OCLC 35972900.
