= Park Street Church =

Church in Boston, Massachusetts

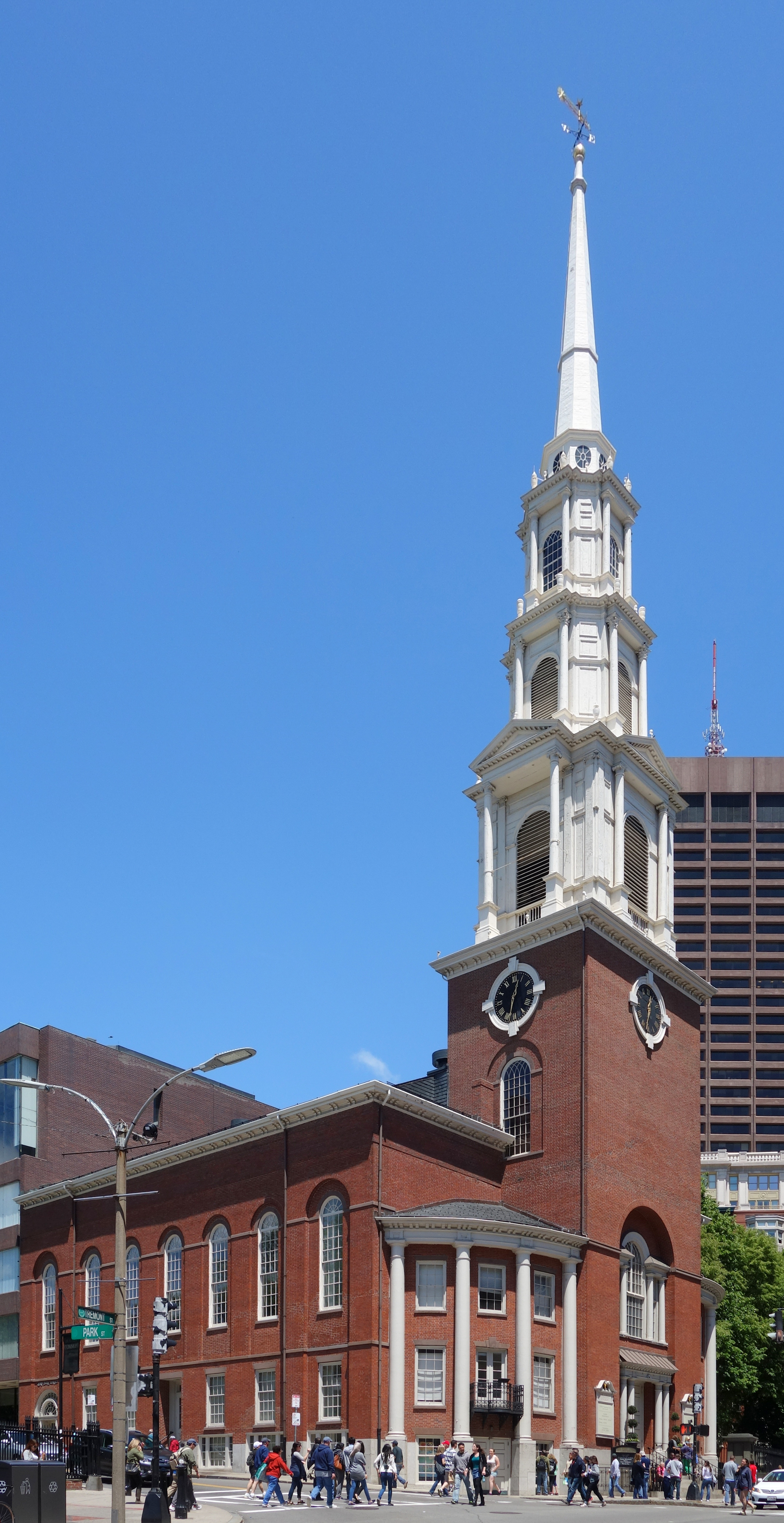
- Park Street Church, Boston, 2014

- Location within Boston
- 42°21′25″N 71°03′44″W
- Location: Downtown Boston, Massachusetts
- Country: United States
- Denomination: Conservative Congregational
- Website: ParkStreet.org

History
- Founded: February 27, 1809

Architecture
- Architect: Peter Banner
- Architectural type: Federal, neoclassical
- Completed: 1809

Specifications
- Height: 217 feet (66 m)

Park Street Congregational Church, founded in 1809, is a historic and active evangelical congregational church in Downtown Boston, Massachusetts, United States. The Park Street Church is a member of the Conservative Congregational Christian Conference. Church membership records are private, but the congregation has over 1,200 members. The church is located at 1 Park Street, at the corner of Tremont Street.

== History ==
Park Street Church is a stop on Boston's Freedom Trail. The founding of the church is dated to 1804 when the "Religious Improvement Society" began weekly meetings with lectures and prayer. The society organized the church on February 27, 1809. Twenty-six local people, mostly former members of the Old South Meeting House, wanted to create a church with orthodox Trinitarian theology.

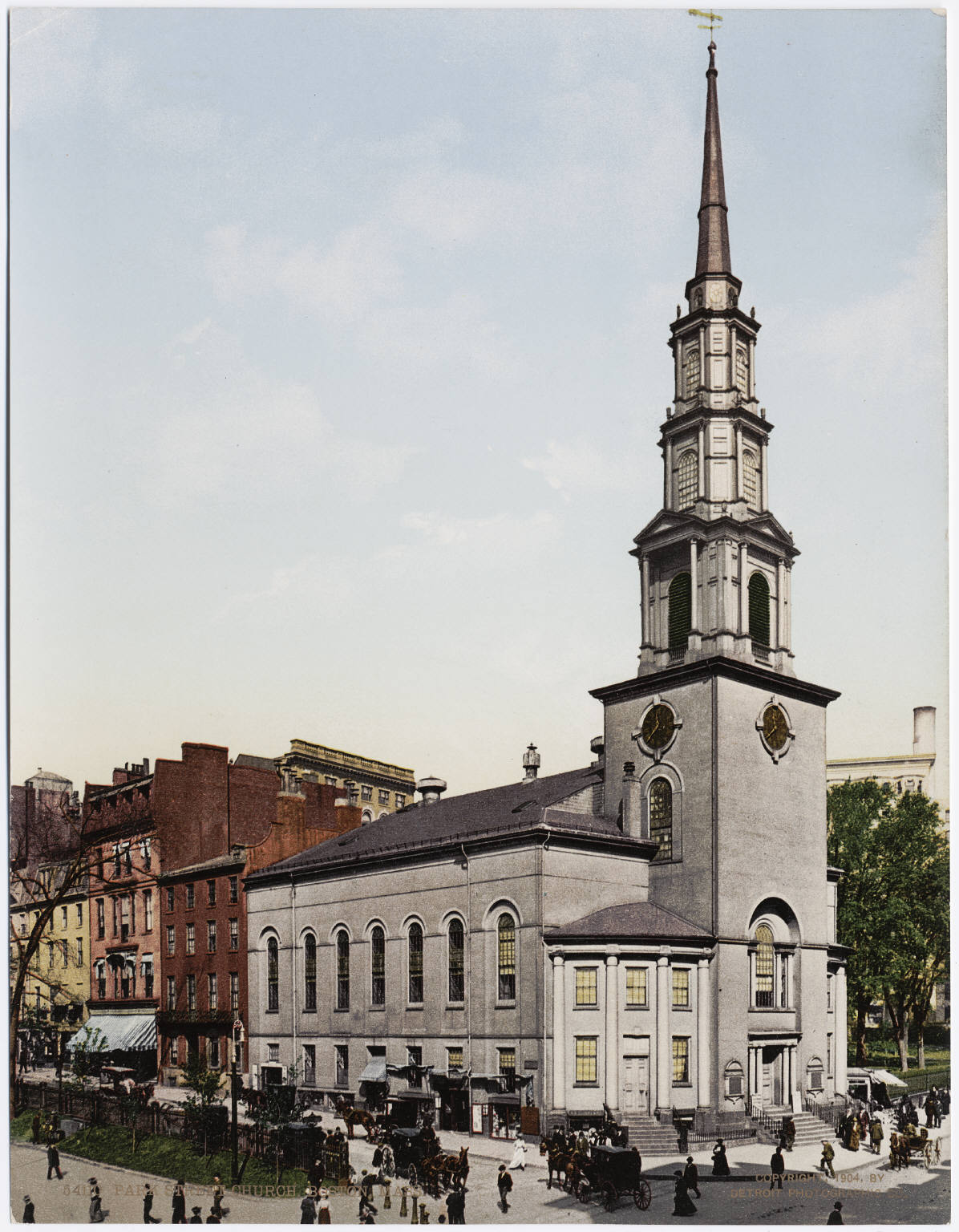
Park St. Church, 1904

The church's cornerstone was laid on May 1, 1809, and construction was completed by the end of the year, under the guidance of Peter Banner (architect), Benajah Young (chief mason) and Solomon Willard (woodcarver). Banner took inspiration from several early pattern books, and his design is reminiscent of a London church by Christopher Wren. Park Street church's steeple rises to 217 feet (66 m), and remains a landmark visible from several Boston neighborhoods. The church was the tallest building in the United States from 1810 to 1828. For much of the early 19th century, it was the first landmark travelers saw when approaching Boston.

The church is next to the historic Granary Burying Ground and was site of granary building for which the burial grounds was named. The first worship service was held on January 10, 1810. The church became known as "Brimstone Corner", in part because of the fervent missionary character of its preaching, and in part because of the storage of gunpowder during the War of 1812.

Park Street Church has a strong tradition of missions, evangelical doctrine, and application of Scripture to social issues, as well as a notable list of firsts. Edward Dorr Griffin (1770–1837) served as the first pastor of the Park Street Church and preached a famous series of Sunday evening sermons attacking the New Divinity. In 1816, Park Street Church joined with Old South Church to form the City Mission Society, a social service society to serve Boston's urban poor.

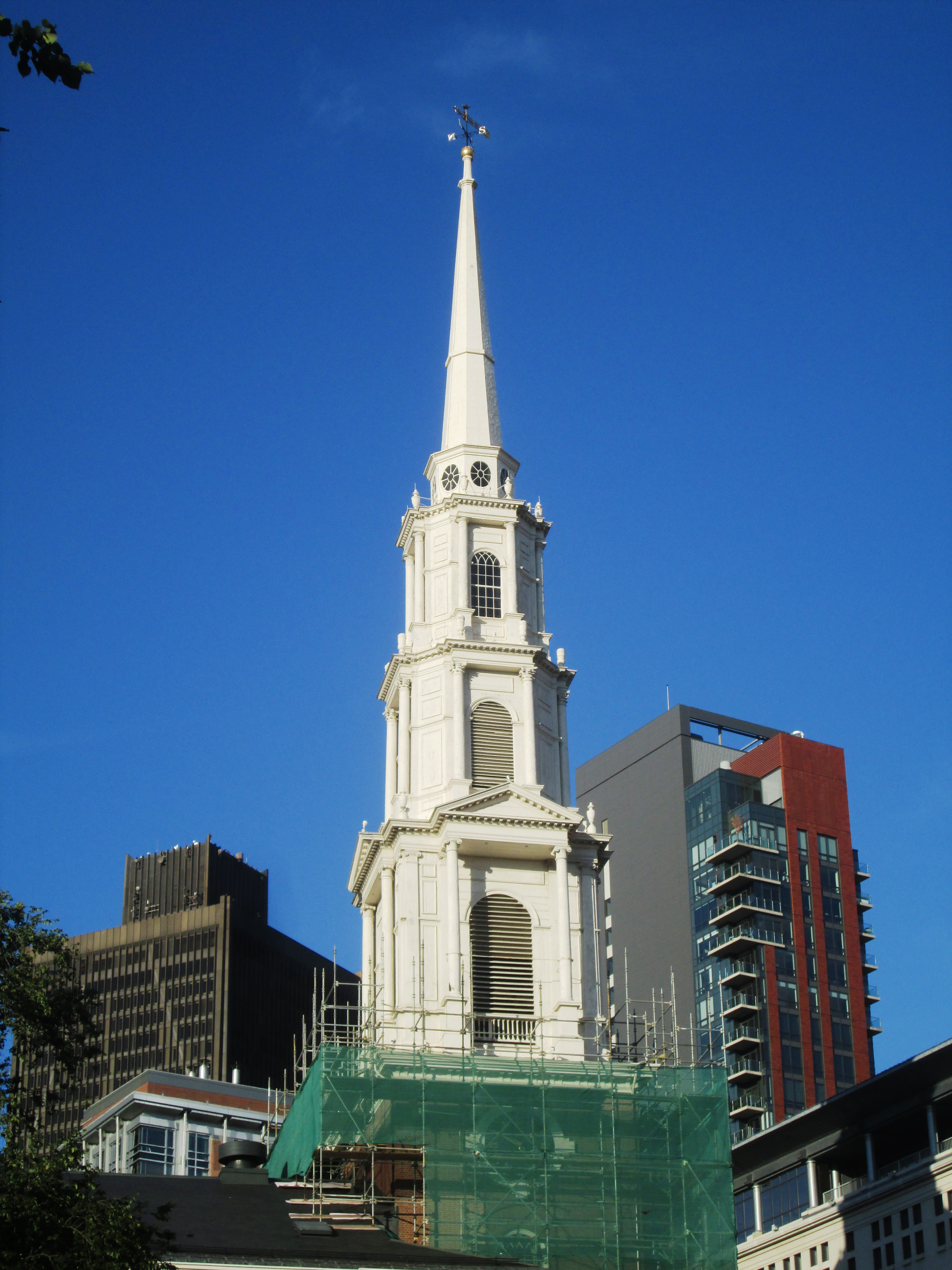
The Park Street steeple in 2017

In 1826, Edward Beecher, the brother of Harriet Beecher Stowe and son of Lyman Beecher, a notable abolitionist, became pastor of the church. On July 4, 1829, William Lloyd Garrison delivered his Address to the Colonization Society at Park Street, making his first major public statement against slavery. From 1829–1831, Lowell Mason, a notable Christian composer, served as choirmaster and organist. The church hosted the debut of "My Country, 'Tis of Thee", also known as "America", by Samuel Francis Smith on July 4, 1831. Park Street also played a role in founding the first "Homeland" or American Mission to the Sandwich Islands (now Hawaii), where that church still stands; the Handel and Haydn Society started there. Benjamin E. Bates, an industrialist who founded Bates College in Maine in 1855, was a Sunday school teacher and active attendant of Park Street in the mid-19th century. In 1857–58, evangelist Charles Finney led a revival at Park Street which led the pastor, Andrew Leete Stone, to experience a spiritual awakening.

Gleason Archer, a prominent inerrantist theologian was the assistant pastor of Park Street from 1945 to 1948, and his father, Suffolk University founder Gleason Archer Sr., served as president of the Park Street Men's Club in the 1920s. In 1949, Billy Graham's first transcontinental mid-century crusade began at Park Street. Harold J. Ockenga, notable theologian and co-architect of the (Neo-)Evangelical movement was the senior pastor from 1936 to 1969, and during this time co-founded Gordon-Conwell Theological Seminary with Billy Graham, co-founded Fuller Theological Seminary, the National Association of Evangelicals, War Relief (which later became World Relief), and the Christian publication Christianity Today.

In 1974, the church built a Church Ministries Building at 1 Park Street beside the main edifice. Designed in a modernist architectural style by Stahl/Bennett Associates with a concrete structure, window-walls and purplish brick facing, the building is described by the Boston Preservation Alliance as follows: "The Church Ministries Building Addition to Park Street Church breaks dramatically with its surroundings in style, while relating coherently to it in materials. The building rises with large panes of glass stretching across its narrow facade and handsome red brick covering the rest of the building. The ground floor is glass and looks out to the Granary Burial Ground beyond the building to the rear".

In the 1990s, the church purchased the 2 and 3 Park Street buildings from Houghton-Mifflin.

Boston Mayor Menino announced February 27, 2009, as Park Street Day in honor of its bicentennial.

From when his tenure began in 2020 through 2024, Senior Minister Mark Booker was the center of disagreements with many of his staff and church leaders. Things came to a head with the firing of Associate Minister Michael Balboni, the public sharing of internal documents alleging spiritual abuse, and a months long process to petition a special meeting to review the Board of Elders' decision to fire Balboni. In a non-binding vote Booker garnered the support of 2/3 of members present at the 2024 Annual Meeting. The resignations of three additional ministers and testimonies of former ministers resulted in a majority of members present at a subsequent meeting rejecting the assertion that Mark Booker is not disqualified from pastoral ministry. Many of the church leadership remained steadfast in their support for Mark as their Senior Minister.

== Today ==
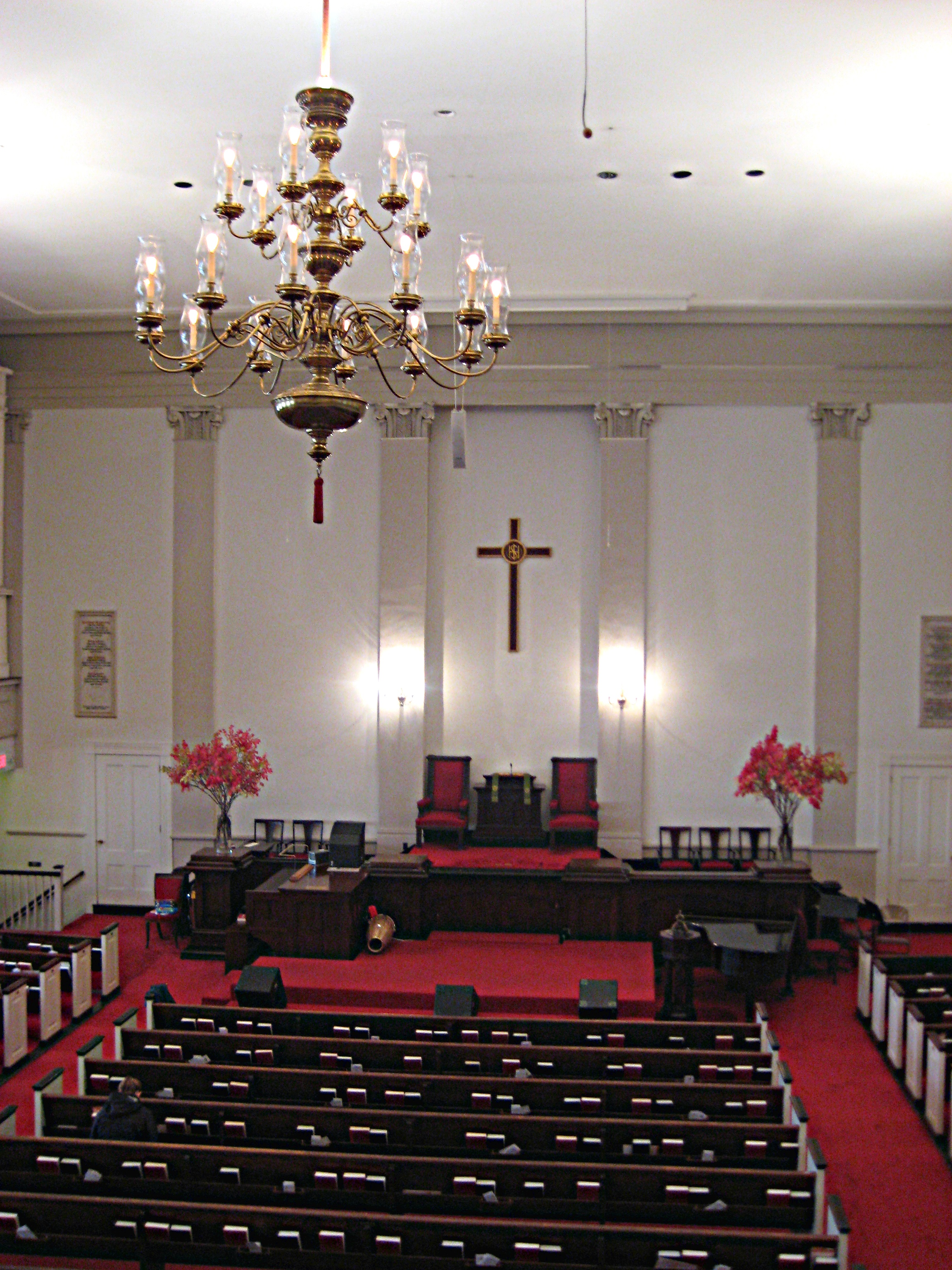
Church interior, 2007

The church still holds to its Statement of Faith adopted by the church in 1877 and readopted in 2003. After 200 years, the church is still engaged in current social issues. For example, Park Street Church helped launch a private high school in Hyde Park, Boston Trinity Academy, in 2002, to help address the educational needs of inner-city Boston (more than 70% of its students are on scholarship and more than 50% are minorities); it hosts many English as a Second Language classes during the week; it has and supports ministries for the homeless, such as Boston Rescue Mission, and Park Street's HOME ministry on Thursday evenings and Saturday mornings; it partners with crisis pregnancy centers Daybreak Pregnancy Resource Center and A Woman's Concern; it provides English classes for international students and immigrants. There are many ministry focus areas: children and teens, young adults, undergraduates, international and graduate students, as well as introductory classes on Christianity and adult education classes. There is also a ministry called Alive in Christ, an affiliate of Hope for Wholeness.

Park Street is an international congregation, with members from more than 60 countries. Park Street believes strongly in education integrated with faith, so it is associated with Park Street Kids, Park Street School, and Boston Trinity Academy, as well as partnering with Cru (formerly known as Campus Crusade for Christ) and InterVarsity Christian Fellowship for undergraduate and graduate ministries, and a long-time partnership with Gordon-Conwell Theological Seminary.

== Senior ministers (1811–present) ==
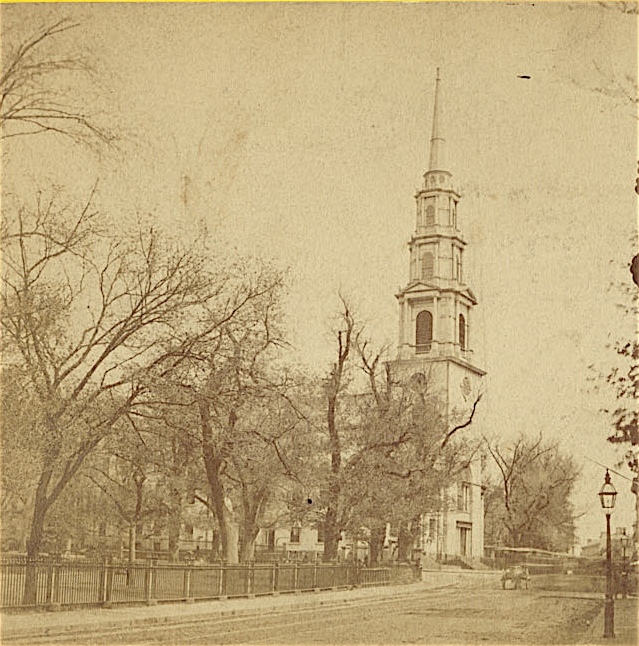
Park Street Church, 19th century

- Edward D. Griffin 1811–1815
- Sereno E. Dwight 1817–1826
- Edward Beecher 1826–1830
- Joel H. Linsley 1832–1835
- Silas Aiken 1837–1848
- Andrew Leete Stone 1849–1866
- William H.H. Murray 1868–1874
- John L. Withrow 1876–1887; 1898–1907
- David Gregg 1887–1890
- Isaac J. Lansing 1893–1897
- Arcturus Z. Conrad 1905–1937
- Harold J. Ockenga 1936–1969
- Paul E. Toms 1969–1989
- David C. Fisher 1989–1995
- Pablo Polischuk (Interim) 1995–1997
- Gordon P. Hugenberger 1997–2017
- Phil Thorne (Interim) 2017–2019
- Mark L. Booker 2020–

== Images ==
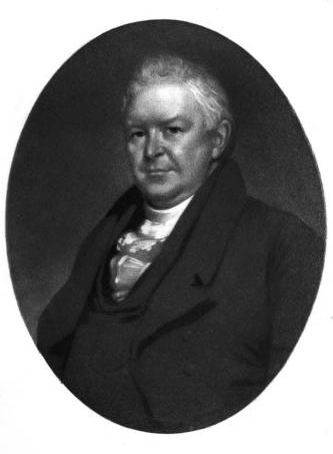
Edward Griffin, minister 1811–1815

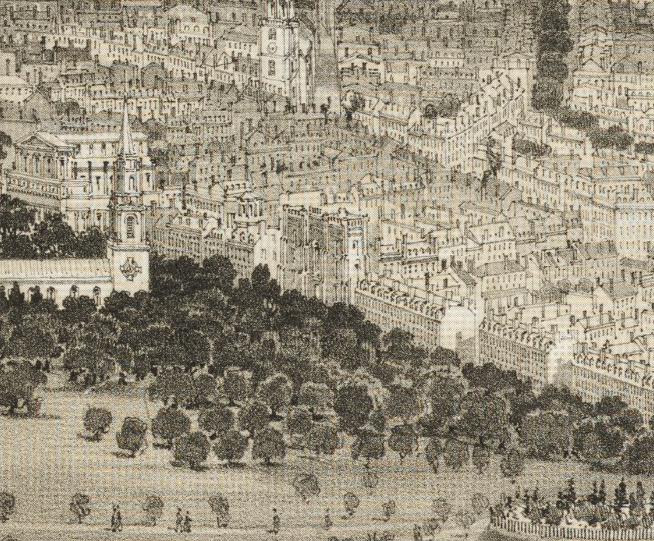
Overview of Common, with Park St. Church (left), across from the Masonic Temple on Tremont St., 1850

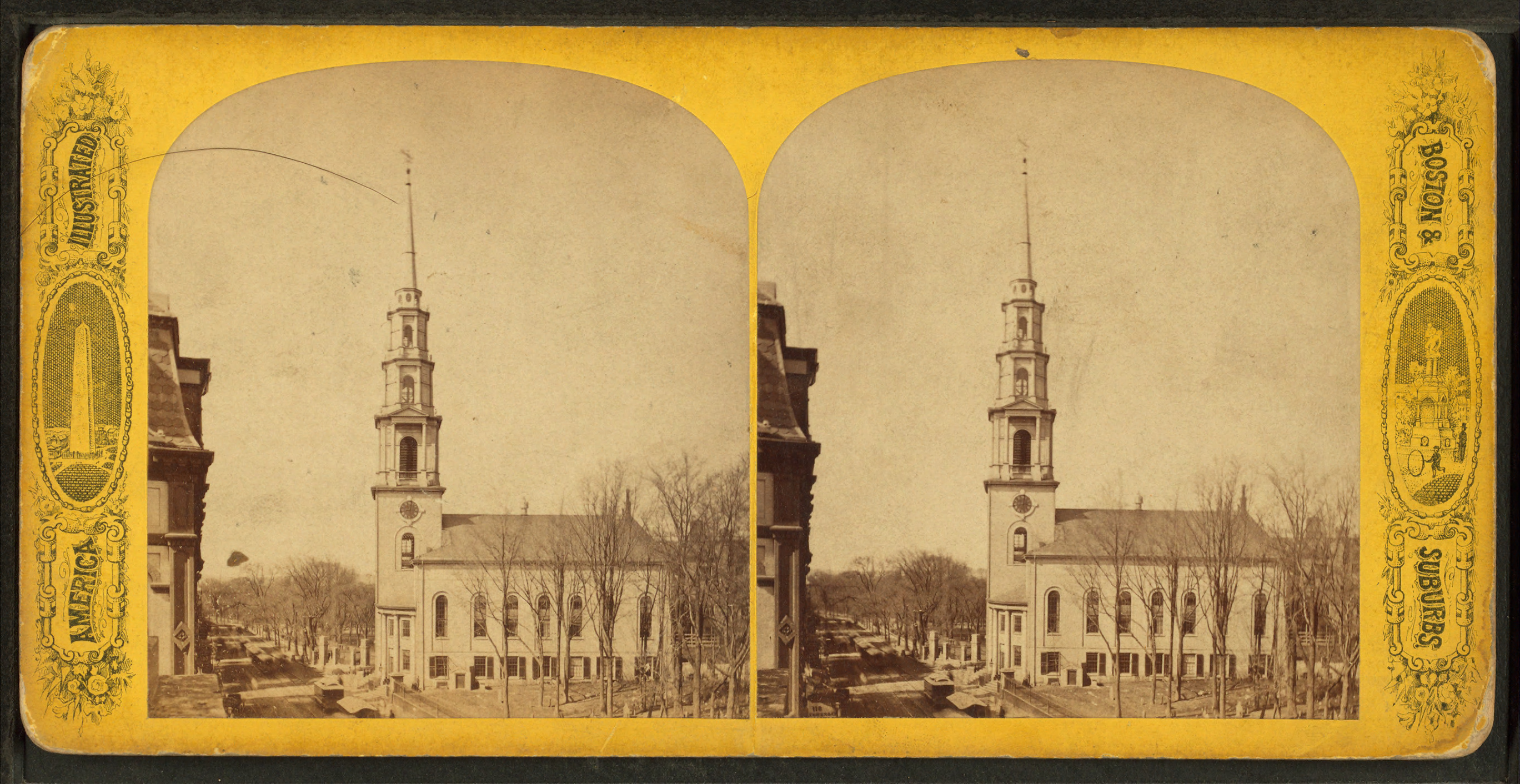
19th century

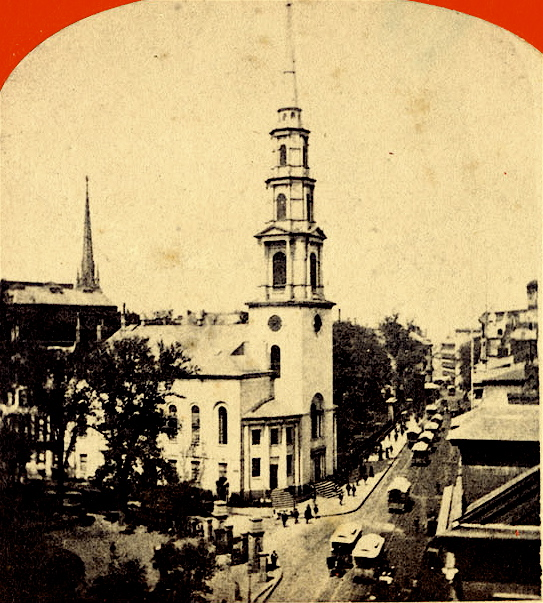
Park St. Church, 19th century

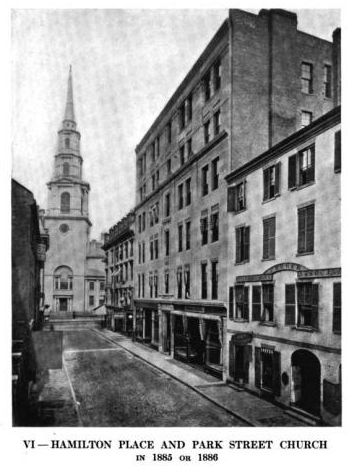
Hamilton Place, with Park St. Church in distance, c. 1885

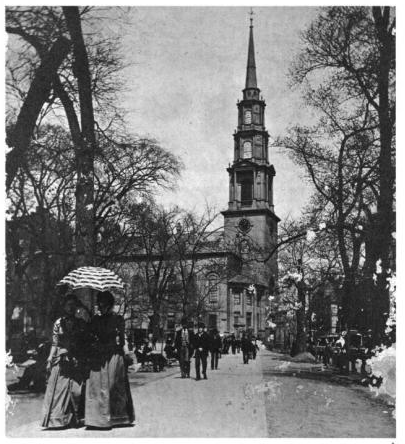
c. 1890

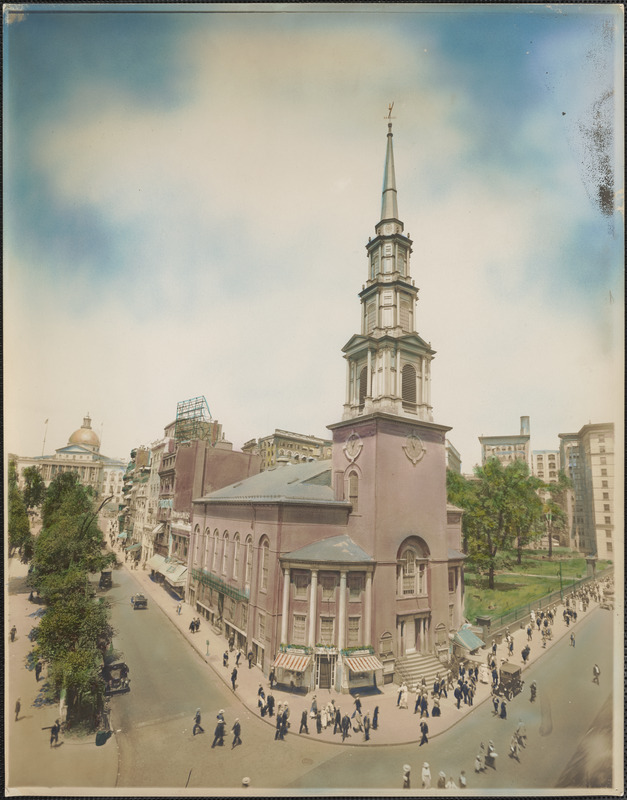
Park Street Church, 1920

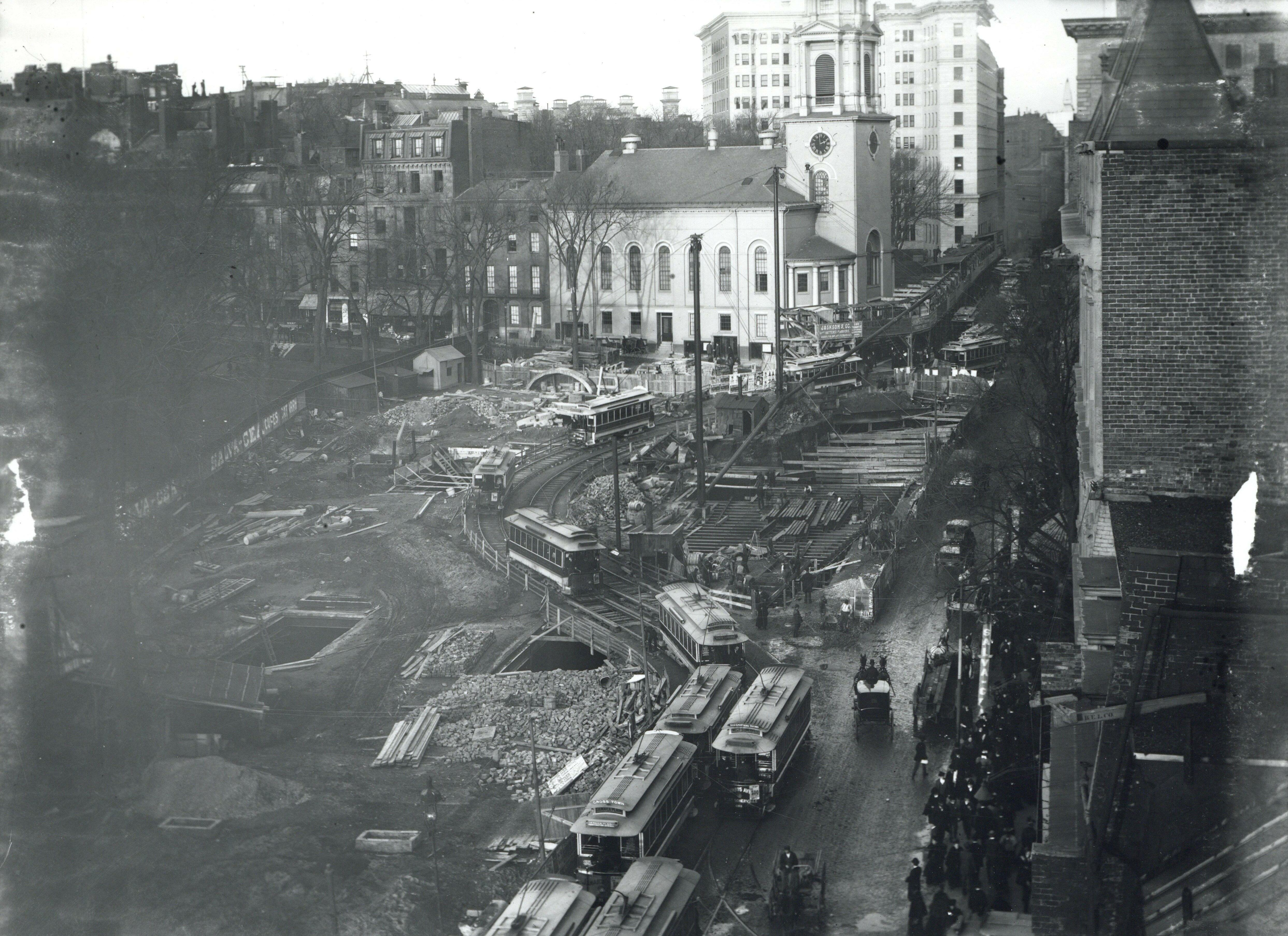
Subway construction, 1896

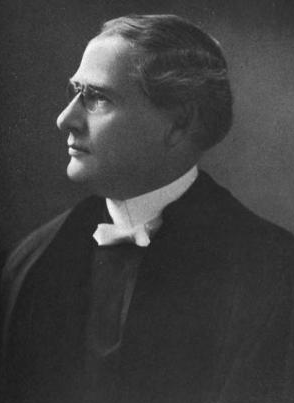
Arturus Conrad, minister 1903–1937

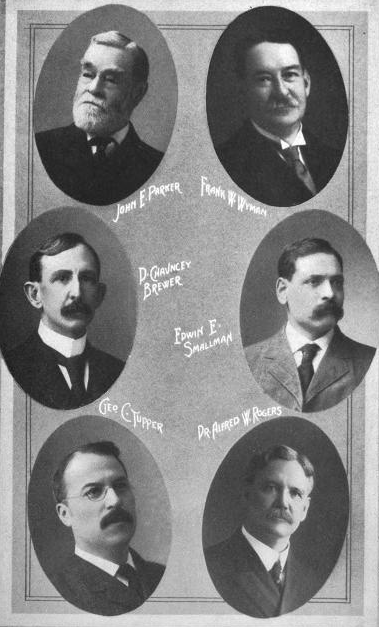
Deacons, 1909

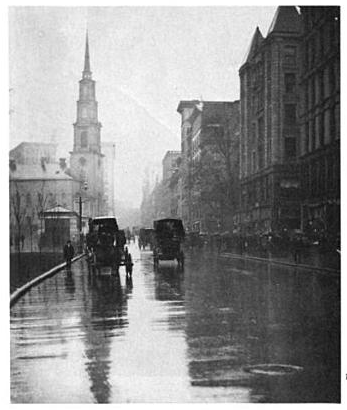
Tremont St. and Park St. Church, 1915

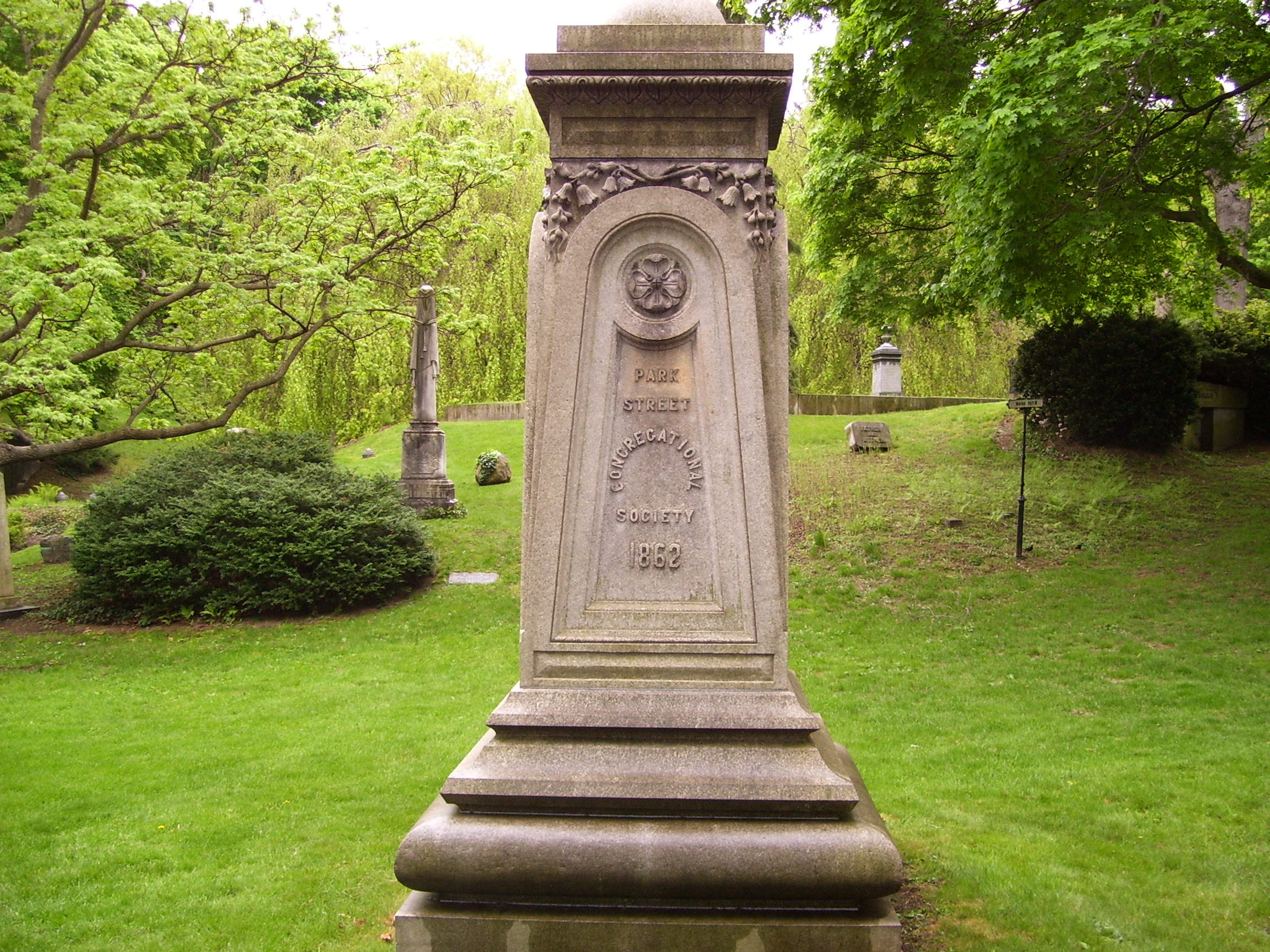
Park Street Church lot at Mount Auburn Cemetery, 2008 photo

Preceded by Massachusetts State House	Locations along Boston's Freedom Trail; Park Street Church	Succeeded by Granary Burying Ground
Records
Preceded by Old North Church	Tallest Building in Boston; 1810–1867; 66 m	Succeeded by Church of the Covenant
Preceded by Christ Church, Philadelphia	Tallest building in the United States; 1810–1828	Succeeded by Phoenix Shot Tower
Preceded by Christ Church, Philadelphia	Tallest building in the United States outside of New York City; 1810–1828	Succeeded by Phoenix Shot Tower
