= Justin Gregg =

Canadian science writer

Justin Gregg is a Canadian science writer and professor of biology at St. Francis Xavier University in Nova Scotia, specializing in dolphin cognition.

== Biography ==
Gregg's research is focused on the study of dolphin cognition. He received his PhD from the School of Psychology at Trinity College Dublin in 2008, going on to hold positions at the Dolphin Communication Project as a senior research associate and St. Francis Xavier University as an adjunct professor of biology.

He is the author of three books. His 2022 book If Nietzsche Were a Narwhal was particularly well received, being variously described as "brilliant" and "compelling".

Beyond his academic work, Gregg has also produced and hosted podcasts, produced radio plays, and released albums with the children's musical group Bingly and the Rogues. He has done voice acting for animated films, and is the frontman for a punk rock band.

== Books ==
- Gregg, Justin (2013). Are Dolphins Really Smart?: The Mammal Behind the Myth. Oxford University Press. ISBN 9780199660452.
- — (2022). If Nietzsche Were a Narwhal: What Animal Intelligence Reveals About Human Stupidity. New York: Little, Brown and Company. ISBN 9780316388061.
- — (2025). Humanish: What Talking to Your Cat or Naming Your Car Reveals About the Uniquely Human Need to Humanize. New York: Little, Brown and Company. ISBN 9780316577588.

== Filmography ==
- Legends of Valhalla: Thor (2011) as Thor
