= Gregg Township =

Gregg Township may refer to the following townships in the United States:

- Gregg Township, Morgan County, Indiana
- Gregg Township, Centre County, Pennsylvania
- Gregg Township, Union County, Pennsylvania
