= Boston Trinity Academy =

Coordinates: 42.25955°N 71.12896°W

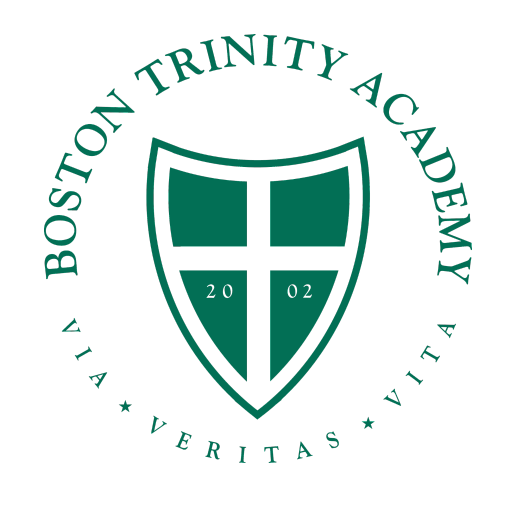

Location
- 17 Hale Street, Boston, Massachusetts; USA

Information
- Type: Independent School, boarding and day
- Motto: Via, Veritas, Vita
- Religious affiliation: Non-denominational Christian
- Established: September 2002
- Headmaster: Timothy Belk
- Faculty: 50
- Grades: 6–12
- Gender: Coeducational
- Enrollment: 262 students
- Campus: Suburban
- Colors: Green and White
- Sports: 20 Interscholastic sports
- Website: http://www.bostontrinity.org

Boston Trinity Academy (BTA) is a private Christian school in Boston, Massachusetts, United States. It currently enrolls roughly 260 students in grades 6–12.

== History ==
In 2002, Boston Trinity Academy was founded by a group of Boston-area business people and residents led by Robert Bradley III, the president of a Boston investment firm. In pursuit of creating a college preparatory school rooted in the principles of the Christian faith, Boston Trinity opened its door with 54 students in grades 6–9 by in a rented school building on Beacon Street in Brookline, between Kenmore Square and Coolidge Corner. Adding a grade each year, the school soon expanded to 125 students, and 16 students of the first senior class graduated in June 2006.

In September 2006, Boston Trinity acquired its first official building and purchased a five-acre property in the Hyde Park neighborhood, where Bernadine Franciscan Sisters operated a Catholic elementary school until 2005.

== Admissions ==
Applications are open for every grade of both Middle School (6–8) and Upper School (9–12). Admission is determined by evaluating required steps to complete an application to Boston Trinity Academy.

Although the deadline for applications is set for each year, entry through rolling admission is available for applications received after the deadline. By partnering with Clarity, Boston Trinity provides financial aid and scholarships to over 60 percent of the student body on a financial needs basis. Guardians of students are required to complete the financial aid application and also submit the Parents’ Financial Statement (PFS).

== Academics ==
Boston Trinity Academy’s curriculum focuses on Philosophy, English, History, Biblical Studies, World Language, Mathematics, Science, and Visual Art. Students are required to take at least three Advanced Placement (AP) courses for college preparation. A Boston Trinity Academy education culminates with Senior Honors Symposium. Encapsulating the interdisciplinary nature of a liberal arts education, Senior Symposium requires students to analyze a topic of social relevance through two lenses: moral philosophy and Christian ethics. Seniors spend the year researching and writing a 20-25 page research paper on their topic, which they then present and defend before a panel of invited judges. The course prepares students for the rigors of college-level research, which numerous alumni have said they felt more than equipped to handle.

== Headmasters ==
- Timothy P. Wiens (2003 - 2010)
- Frank Guerra (2010 - 2021)
- Timothy Belk (2022–Present)

== Athletics ==
As a member of the New England Preparatory School Athletic Council (NEPSAC), Boston Trinity Lions compete in Massachusetts Bay Independent League (MBIL), and Lady Lions participate in Girls Independent League (GIL). The Athletics program at Boston Trinity requires all students to play at least one sport as part of a well-rounded education. There are three sports seasons each year, Fall, Winter, and Spring, and Boston Trinity offers a wide variety of sports: baseball, cross-country, soccer, lacrosse, basketball, tennis, and softball. Basketball and soccer teams at Boston Trinity are especially successful and competitive, as they have won multiple championships. Nisre Zouzoua, 2014 and 2015 NEPSAC Class D MVP, became Boston Trinity's first Division 1 recruit as a member of the class of 2015 and now plays on the men's basketball team at Bryant University.

=== Recent accomplishments ===
- 2024-2025: Girls Varsity Tennis (IGC Championship)
- 2024-2025: Boys Varsity Basketball (MBIL Championship)
- 2023-2024: MBIL Boys Varsity Baseball Champions
- 2022-2023: MBIL Boys Varsity Baseball Champions
- 2022-2023: IGC D2 Girls Varsity Basketball Champions
- 2017–2018: MBIL A Division Boys Basketball Champions
- 2016–2017: MBIL Boys Tennis Champions
- 2015–2016: IGC Girls Tennis Champions
- 2015–2016: GIL Girls Softball Champions
- 2015–2016: MBIL D-2 Boys Soccer Champions
- 2014–2015: GIL Girls Soccer Champions
- 2014–2015: IGC Girls Tennis Co-Champions
- 2014–2015: NEPSAC, Class D-1, Boys Basketball Champions
- 2014–2015: MBIL, A Division, Basketball Champions
- 2013–2014: GIL Soccer Champions
- 2013–2014: MBIL, A Division, Basketball Champions
- 2013–2014: NEPSAC Class D-1 Boys Basketball Champions
- 2012–2013: MBIL, A Division, Basketball Champions
- 2012–2013: MBIL Boys Baseball Champions
- 2011–2012: MBIL A Division Boys Basketball Champions
- 2011–2012: GIL Basketball Champions
- 2010–2011 GIL Basketball Champions
- 2010–2011: GIL Soccer Champions
- 2009–2010: NEPSAC, Class D-1, Boys Basketball Champions
- 2009–2010: MBIL, A Division, Basketball Champions
- 2009–2010: GIL Basketball Champions
- 2008–2009: MBIL, B Division, Lacrosse Champions
- 2008–2009: MBIL, A Division, Basketball Champions
- 2008–2009: MBIL, B Division, Soccer Champions
- 2007–2008: NCSAA, Division 2, Boys Basketball Champions
- 2007–2008: MBIL, A Division, Basketball Champions
- 2007–2008: MBIL, B Division, Soccer Champions
