= David Gregg (minister) =

American minister and author

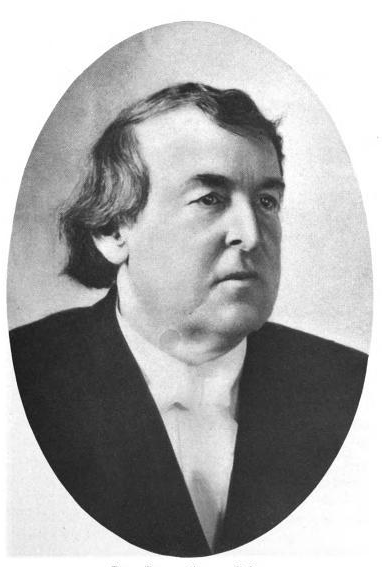

Personal details
- Born: March 25, 1846 Pittsburgh, Pennsylvania
- Died: October 11, 1919 (aged 73) New York, New York
- Spouse: Kate Etheridge (m. 1871)
- Education: Washington and Jefferson College; Iron City Commercial College; New York University
- Occupation: Clergyman, writer

David Gregg (1846-1919) was an American minister at Park Street Church and author.

== Biography ==
David Gregg was born in Pittsburgh, Pennsylvania to David and Mary M. Gregg on March 25, 1846. He attended public schools until the age of thirteen when he attended Allegheny City College and at fifteen years enrolled in Washington and Jefferson College graduating in 1865. Next he graduated from the Iron City Commercial College in Pittsburgh in 1866. Gregg later received the degree of D.D. from the New York University in 1888. He was educated as a Scotch Covenanter (Presbyterian) and at the age of twenty-three began preaching at the Scotch church on West Twenty-Third Street in New York. He later became pastor of Park Street Church in Boston on February 1, 1887, until 1890. From 1890 to 1903, Gregg was pastor of the Lafayette Avenue Presbyterian Church in Brooklyn, New York. In 1892, to mark the 400th anniversary of the arrival of Christopher Columbus in the Americas, he preached a sermon series in Brooklyn honoring the contributions of "our American foremothers" and "our African American forefathers." After leaving Brooklyn, he became president of Western Theological Seminary in Pittsburgh, Pennsylvania.

Gregg married Kate Etheridge in New York in 1871 and they had several children. Gregg's family traces its ancestry directly back to the Scotch Covenanters of 1638. Gregg considered himself an abolitionist and delivered his first public speech in support of the Emancipation Proclamation. During Lee's invasion into Pennsylvania, Gregg enlisted as an "emergency man" in Camp Howe to replace Union troops heading to Gettysburg.

David Gregg died at his daughter's home in Manhattan on October 11, 1919.

== Works ==
- Studies in John's gospel: the gospel of Christ's deity (1891)
- Our best moods: soliloquies and other discourses (1893)
- The testimony of the land to the Book, or, The evidential value of Palestine (1896)
- Facts that call for faith: a series of discourses (1898)
- Makers of the American Republic (1905)
- Between the Testaments, or, Interbiblical history (1907)
