= Spotted anole =

There are two species of lizard named spotted anole:

- Anolis stratulus, found in Puerto Rico, the United States Virgin Islands, and the British Virgin Islands
- Anolis punctatus, found in Brazil, Venezuela, Guyana, Peru, Ecuador, Colombia, and Bolivia
