= Oxybelis rutherfordi =

Scientific classification
- Kingdom: Animalia
- Phylum: Chordata
- Class: Reptilia
- Order: Squamata
- Suborder: Serpentes
- Family: Colubridae
- Genus: Oxybelis
- Species: O. rutherfordi

Binomial name
- Oxybelis rutherfordi Jadin, Blair, Orlofske, Jowers, Rivas, Vitt, Ray, Smith & Murphy 2020

Species of snake

Oxybelis rutherfordi, Rutherford's vine snake, commonly known as the Horsewhip in Trinidad and Tobago, is a species of snake. The species was originally described in 2020 by Robert C. Jadin, Christopher Blair, Sarah A. Orlofske, Michael J. Jowers, Gilson A. Rivas, Laurie J. Vitt, Julie M. Ray, Eric N. Smith & John C. Murphy.

== Description ==
Oxybelis rutherfordi is one of the Neotropical vine snakes . In 2020 it was described as being distinct from a similar species of vine snake; Oxybelis aeneus. Phylogenetic analyses has shown distinctive genetic differences.

== Range and habitat ==
The species has been observed in Trinidad and Tobago, Venezuela including Margarita Island, and French Guiana. The Holotype was collected in the grounds of the William Beebe Tropical Research Station (also known as Simla), in the Arima Valley in the Northern Range of Trinidad and is an adult female.

== Etymology ==
The species was named after Mike G. Rutherford, collector of the holotype and at the time curator of the University of the West Indies Zoology Museum (UWIZM), for his contributions to the zoology and natural history of Trinidad and Tobago.
