= Xenoxybelis =

Scientific classification
- Domain: Eukaryota
- Kingdom: Animalia
- Phylum: Chordata
- Class: Reptilia
- Order: Squamata
- Suborder: Serpentes
- Family: Colubridae
- Subfamily: Dipsadinae
- Genus: Xenoxybelis; Machado, 1993

Species
- See text

Genus of snakes

Xenoxybelis is a genus of colubrid snakes endemic to South America.

== Species ==
There are 2 recognized species.

- Xenoxybelis argenteus (Daudin, 1803) – NW South America - - striped sharpnose snake, diurnal vine snake
- Xenoxybelis boulengeri (Procter, 1923) – Bolivia, Peru, Brazil - southern sharpnose snake

Nota bene: A binomial authority in parentheses indicates that the species was originally described in a genus other than Xenoxybelis.
