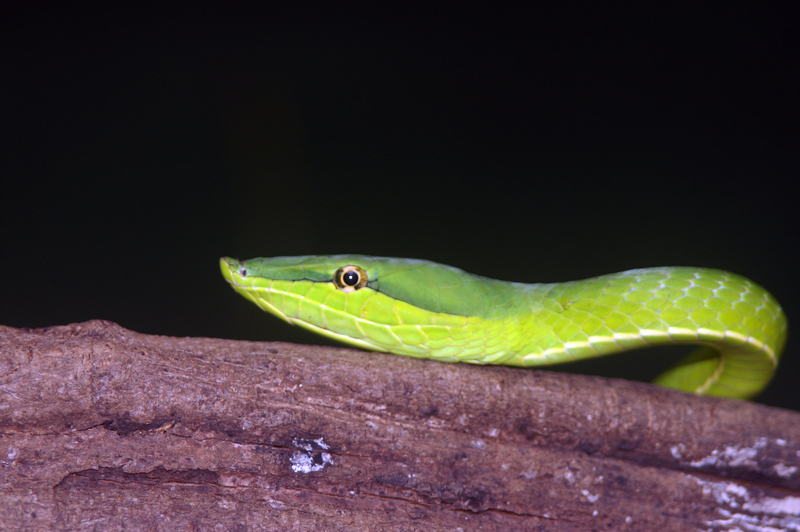
- Oxybelis fulgidus

Scientific classification
- Kingdom: Animalia
- Phylum: Chordata
- Class: Reptilia
- Order: Squamata
- Suborder: Serpentes
- Family: Colubridae
- Subfamily: Colubrinae
- Genus: Oxybelis; Wagler, 1830

Synonyms
- Coluber, Dryinus, Dryophis

= Oxybelis =

Genus of snakes

Oxybelis is a genus of colubrid snakes, endemic to the Americas, which are commonly known as vine snakes. Though similar in appearance to the Asian species of vine snakes of the genus Ahaetulla, they are not closely related, and are an example of convergent evolution.

== Geographic range ==
Species of Oxybelis are found from the southwestern United States, through Central America, to the northern countries of South America.

== Description ==
Body slender and laterally compressed, tail long. Head elongated and distinct from neck. Pupil of eye round.

Dorsal scales smooth or weakly keeled, with apical pits, and arranged in 15 or 17 rows at midbody. Ventrals rounded at sides, subcaudals paired (divided).

Maxillary teeth 20–25, subequal, except for the 3–5 most posterior, which are slightly enlarged and grooved on the outer surface. Anterior mandibular teeth strongly enlarged.

== Species ==
There are 11 widely recognized species in the genus Oxybelis.

- Oxybelis aeneus (Wagler, 1824) – Mexican vine snake
- Oxybelis brevirostris (Cope, 1861) – Cope's vine snake
- Oxybelis fulgidus (Daudin, 1803) – green vine snake
- Oxybelis inkaterra Jadin, Jowers, Orlofske, Duellman, Blair, & Murphy, 2021 – Inkaterra vine snake
- Oxybelis koehleri Jadin, Blair, Orlofske, Jowers, Rivas, Vitt, Ray, Smith, & Murphy, 2020 – Köhler's vine snake
- Oxybelis microphthalmus Barbour & Amaral, 1926 – thornscrub vine snake
- Oxybelis potosiensis (Taylor, 1941) – Gulf Coast vine snake
- Oxybelis rutherfordi Jadin, Blair, Orlofske, Jowers, Rivas, Vitt, Ray, Smith, & Murphy, 2020 – Rutherford's vine snake
- Oxybelis transandinus Torres-Carvajal, Mejía-Guerrero, & Terán, 2021
- Oxybelis vittatus (Girard), 1854
- Oxybelis wilsoni Villa & McCranie, 1995 – Roatan vine snake

Nota bene A binomial authority in parentheses indicates that the species was originally described in a genus other than Oxybelis.

== Etymology ==
The specific name, wilsoni, is in honor of American herpetologist Larry David Wilson.
