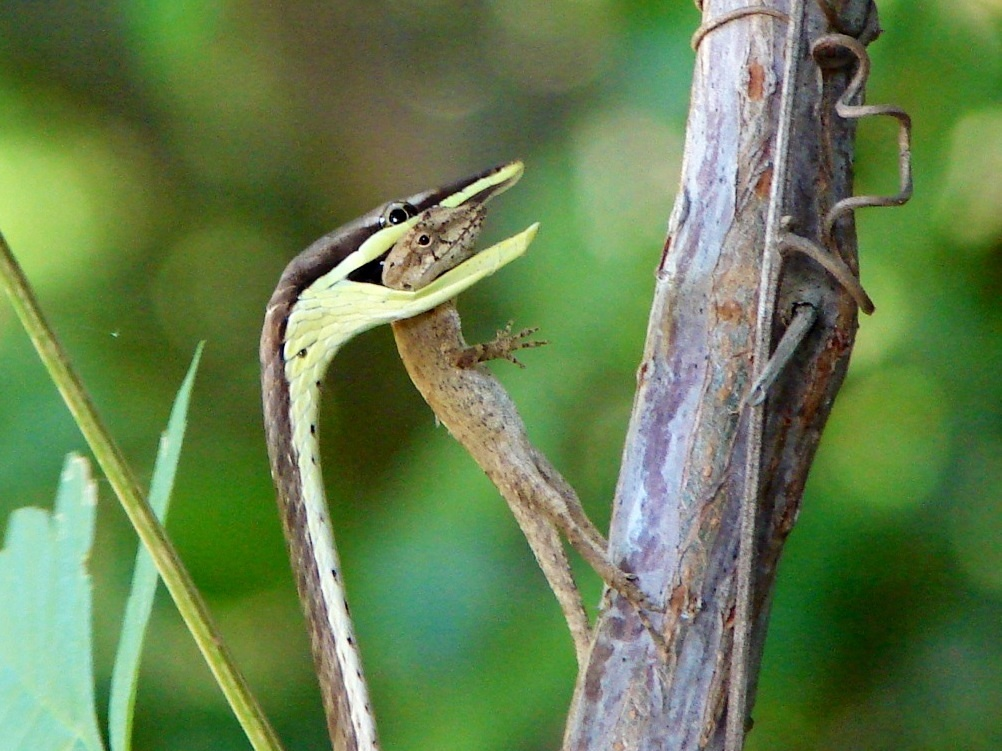
- Eating a clouded anole

Scientific classification
- Kingdom: Animalia
- Phylum: Chordata
- Class: Reptilia
- Order: Squamata
- Suborder: Serpentes
- Family: Colubridae
- Genus: Oxybelis
- Species: O. microphthalmus

Binomial name
- Oxybelis microphthalmus Barbour & Amaral, 1926
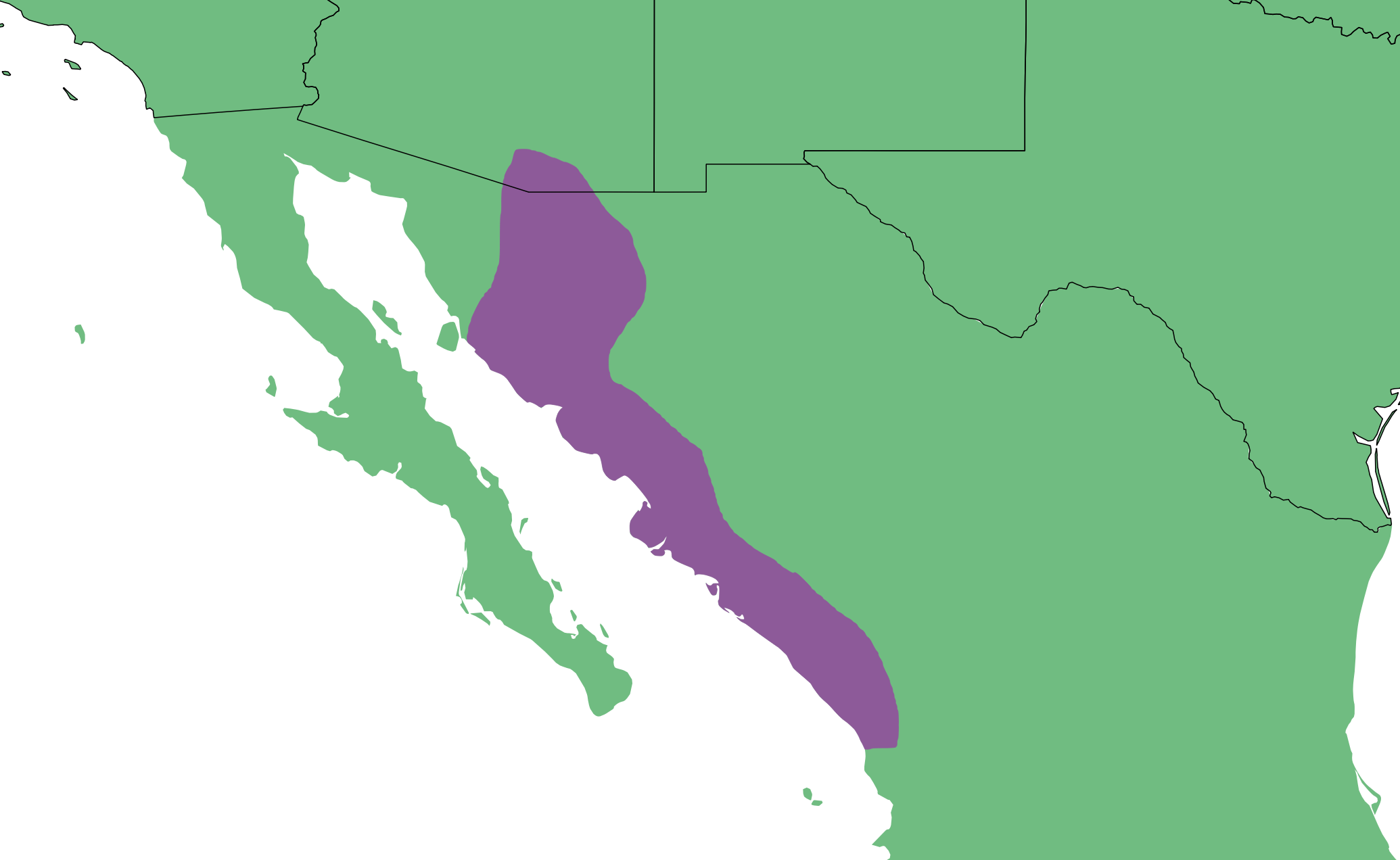

= Oxybelis microphthalmus =

Species of snake

Oxybelis microphthalmus, the thornscrub vine snake, is a species of snake of the family Colubridae.

The snake is found in Arizona in the United States and Mexico.
