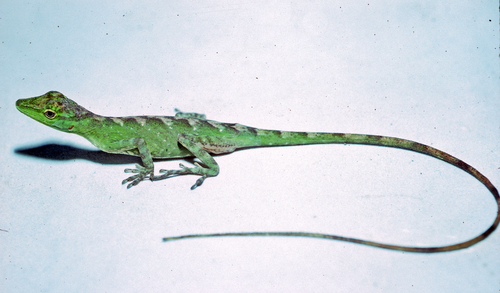

Conservation status
- Least Concern (IUCN 3.1)

Scientific classification
- Kingdom: Animalia
- Phylum: Chordata
- Class: Reptilia
- Order: Squamata
- Suborder: Iguania
- Family: Dactyloidae
- Genus: Anolis
- Species: A. boettgeri

Binomial name
- Anolis boettgeri Boulenger, 1911

Synonyms
- Anolis boettgeri Boulenger, 1911; Anolis albimaculatus Henle & Ehrl, 1991; Dactyloa boettgeri — Nicholson et al., 2012

= Anolis boettgeri =

Species of lizard

Anolis boettgeri, also known commonly as Boettger's anole, is a species of lizard in the family Dactyloidae. The species is endemic to Peru.

== Etymology ==
The specific name, boettgeri, is in honor of Enrique Böttger (1856–1944), a Peruvian who collected the type series.

== Geographic range ==
A. boettgeri is found in Oxapampa Province, Peru.

== Reproduction ==
A. boettgeri is oviparous.

== Taxonomy ==
A. boettgeri has been referred to the Dactyloa punctata species group.
