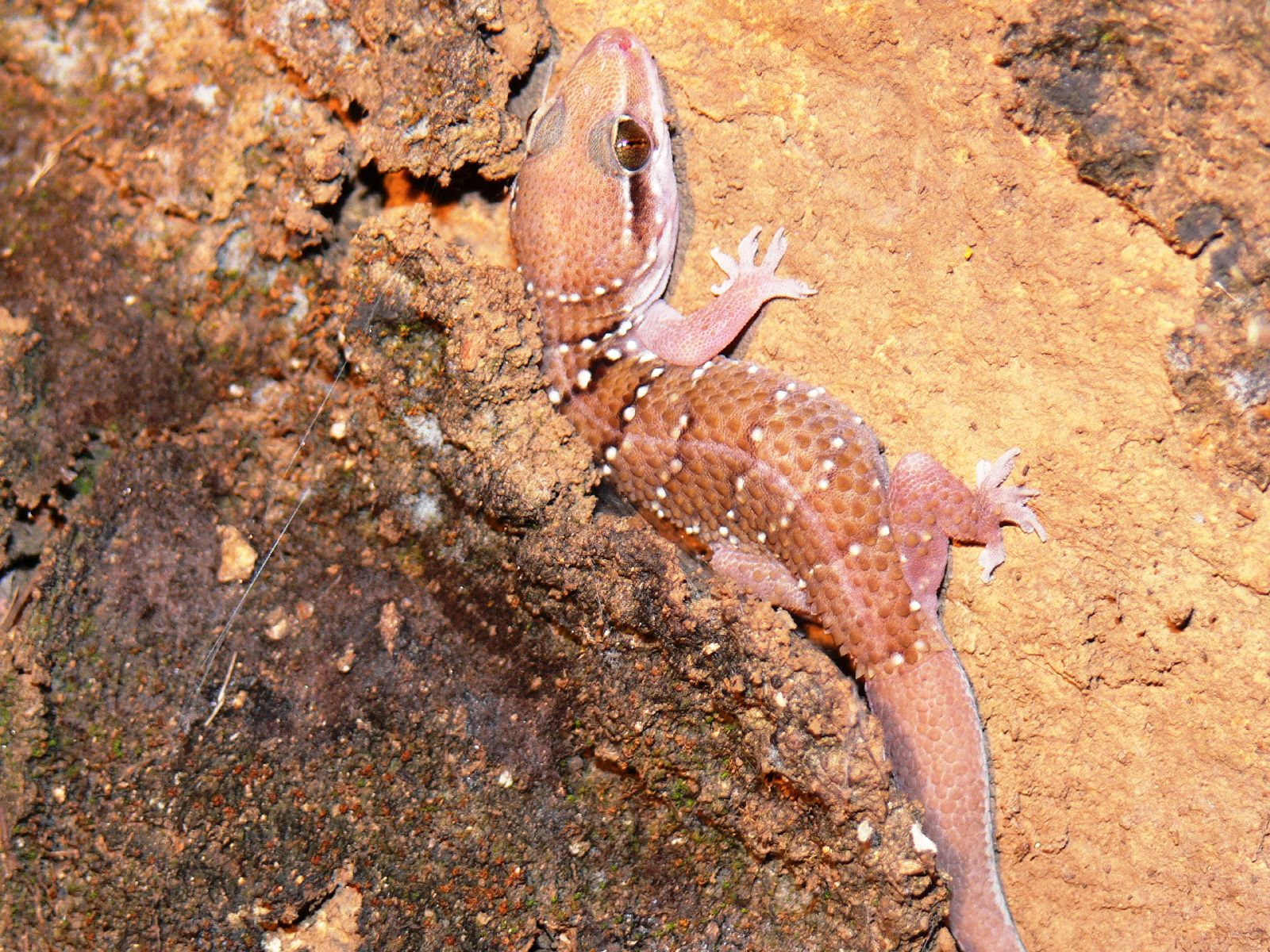
- from South India

Conservation status
- Least Concern (IUCN 3.1)

Scientific classification
- Kingdom: Animalia
- Phylum: Chordata
- Class: Reptilia
- Order: Squamata
- Suborder: Gekkota
- Family: Gekkonidae
- Genus: Hemidactylus
- Species: H. triedrus

Binomial name
- Hemidactylus triedrus (Daudin, 1802)

Synonyms
- Gecko triedrus; Hemidactylus triedruso

= Hemidactylus triedrus =

Species of lizard

Hemidactylus triedrus, also known as the termite hill gecko, Dakota's leaf-toed gecko, or blotched house gecko, is a species of gecko found in South Asia. The race lankae of Sri Lanka, is now given species status and known as Hemidactylus lankae

== Description ==
Head large, oviform; snout longer than the distance between the eye and the ear-opening, 1.4 times the diameter of the orbit; forehead concave; ear-opening large, suboval, oblique, measuring about half the diameter of the eye. Body and limbs moderate. Digits free, moderately dilated, inner well developed; infra-digital lamellae slightly oblique, 6 or 7 under the inner digits, 8 to 10 under the median digits. Snout covered with convex granules, which may be keeled; hinder part of head with minute granules intermixed with roundish tubercles. Rostral subquadrangular, not twice as broad as deep, with median cleft above; nostril pierced between the rostral, the first labial, and three or four nasals; 8 to 10 upper and 7 or 8 lower labials; mental large, triangular or pentagonal, at least twice as long as the adjacent labials; four chin-shields, median pair largest and in contact behind the mental. Upper surface of body covered with small flat granular scales, and large trihedral tubercles arranged in 16 to 20 more or less irregular longitudinal series; these tubercles vary somewhat in size according to specimens, but the largest never exceed two fifths the diameter of the eye. Abdominal scales large, smooth, rounded, imbricate. Males with a series of preanal pores, interrupted mesially; 6 to 8 pores on each side Tail rounded, feebly depressed, tapering, covered above with irregular, small, smooth imbricated scales and rings of large, pointed, keeled tubercles, beneath with a median series of transversely dilated plates. Light pinkish brown above, generally with more or less defined transverse darker bands bordered by pure white tubercles surrounded by deep-brown rings; young very regularly barred with dark brown, there being four dark bars between head and hind limbs; a more or less defined dark-brown streak, white-edged above, on the side of the head, passing through the eye; lower surfaces white.

From snout to vent 3.7 inches; tail 3.8.

== Distribution ==
Sri Lanka, Pakistan (Karachi eastward), India Race lanka: Sri Lanka; Type locality: Ceylon.
