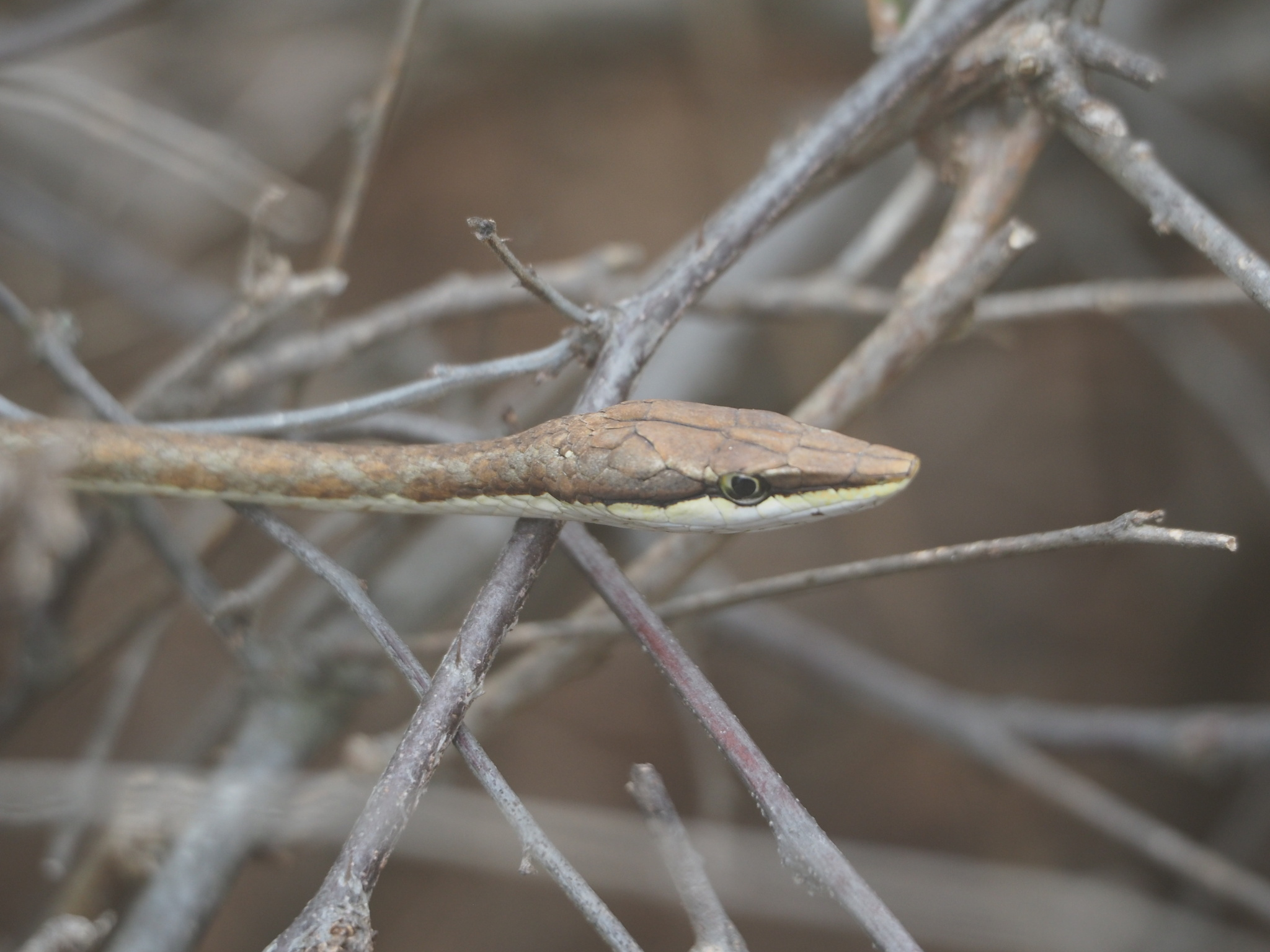

Scientific classification
- Kingdom: Animalia
- Phylum: Chordata
- Class: Reptilia
- Order: Squamata
- Suborder: Serpentes
- Family: Colubridae
- Genus: Oxybelis
- Species: O. transandinus

Binomial name
- Oxybelis transandinus Torres-Carvajal, Mejía-Guerrero & Terán, 2021

= Oxybelis transandinus =

Species of snake

Oxybelis transandinus is a species of snake. The species was originally described in 2021 by Omar Torres-Carvajal, Mauricio Mejía-Guerrero and Claudia Terán from the Museo de Zoología of the Pontificia Universidad Católica in Ecuador.

== Description ==
Oxybelis transandinus is a species of Neotropical vine snakes that is endemic to Ecuador. It has been recently described as being distinct from a similar species of vine snake; Oxybelis aeneus. Phylogenetic analyses has shown distinctive genetic differences.

== Range & habitat ==
The species has been observed in Ecuador. The Holotype has been collected in Bosqueira Protected Forest and is an adult male. Paratypes were collected throughout the Pacific lowlands of Ecuador. The species have been observed in dry ecosystems where the snake is active from the ground up to 1.5 meters in shrubs.

== Etymology ==
The name of the species is derived from Latin, where "Trans", means beyond and "Andinus" means Andean.
