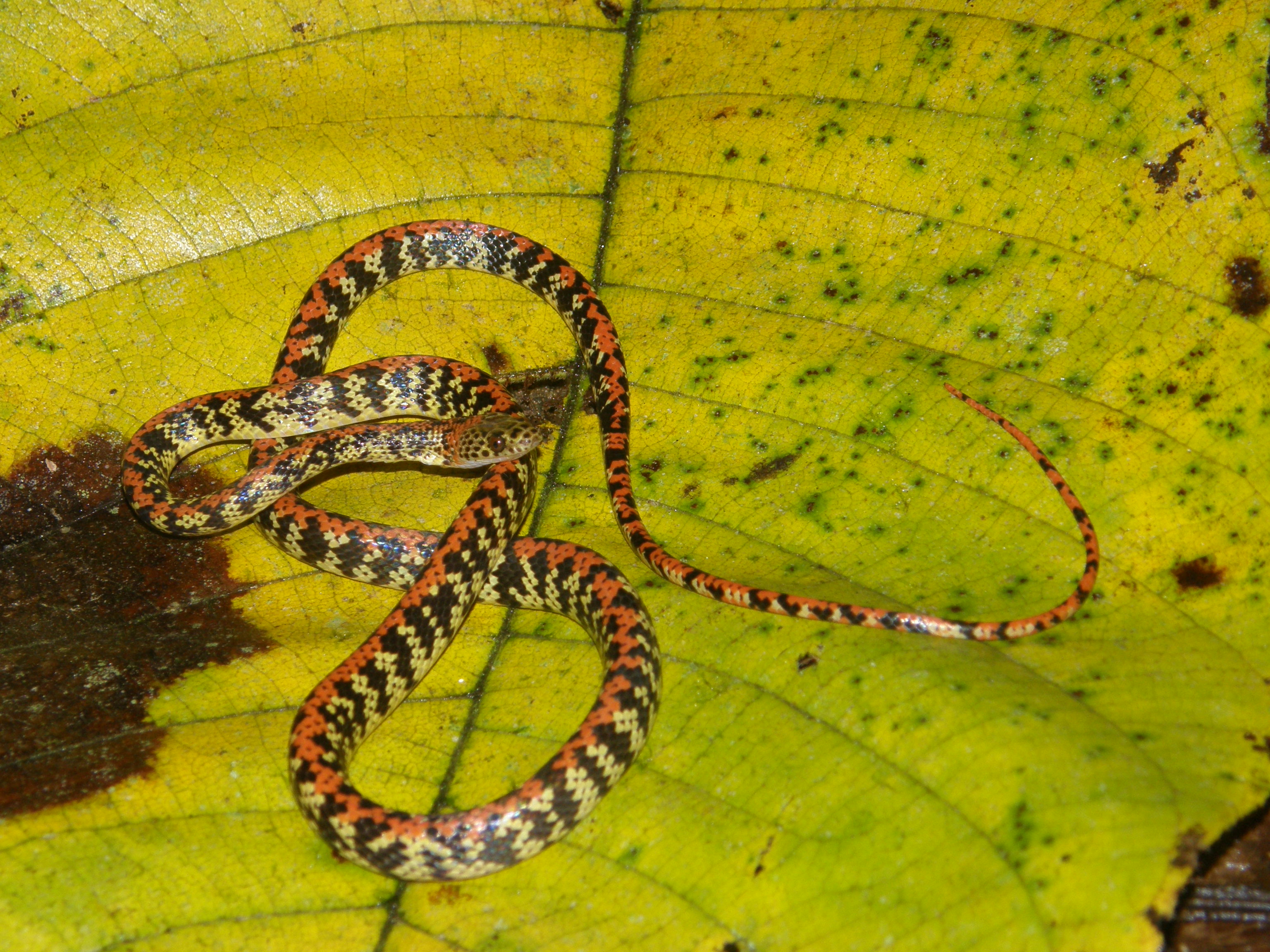
- Siphlophis cervinus

Scientific classification
- Kingdom: Animalia
- Phylum: Chordata
- Class: Reptilia
- Order: Squamata
- Suborder: Serpentes
- Family: Colubridae
- Subfamily: Dipsadinae
- Genus: Siphlophis; Fitzinger, 1843

= Siphlophis =

Genus of snakes

Siphlophis is a genus of snakes of the family Colubridae. The genus is endemic to the Americas.

== Geographic range ==
Species of the genus Siphlophis are found in northern South America and Central America.

== Species ==
The following seven species are recognized as being valid.

- Siphlophis ayauma Sheehy, Yánez-Muñoz, Valencia & E.N. Smith, 2014 - Devil’s Head spotted night snake
- Siphlophis cervinus (Laurenti, 1768) - Panamanian spotted night snake, Panama spotted night snake
- Siphlophis compressus (Daudin, 1803) - tropical flat snake
- Siphlophis leucocephalus (Günther, 1863) - common spotted night snake
- Siphlophis longicaudatus (Andersson, 1901) - Brazilian spotted night snake
- Siphlophis pulcher (Raddi, 1820) - Guanabara spotted night snake
- Siphlophis worontzowi (Prado, 1940) - Worontzow's spotted night snake

Nota bene: A binomial authority in parentheses indicates that the species was originally described in a genus other than Siphlophis.

== Etymology ==
The specific name, worontzowi, is in honor of Brazilian entomologist Cesar Worontzow.
