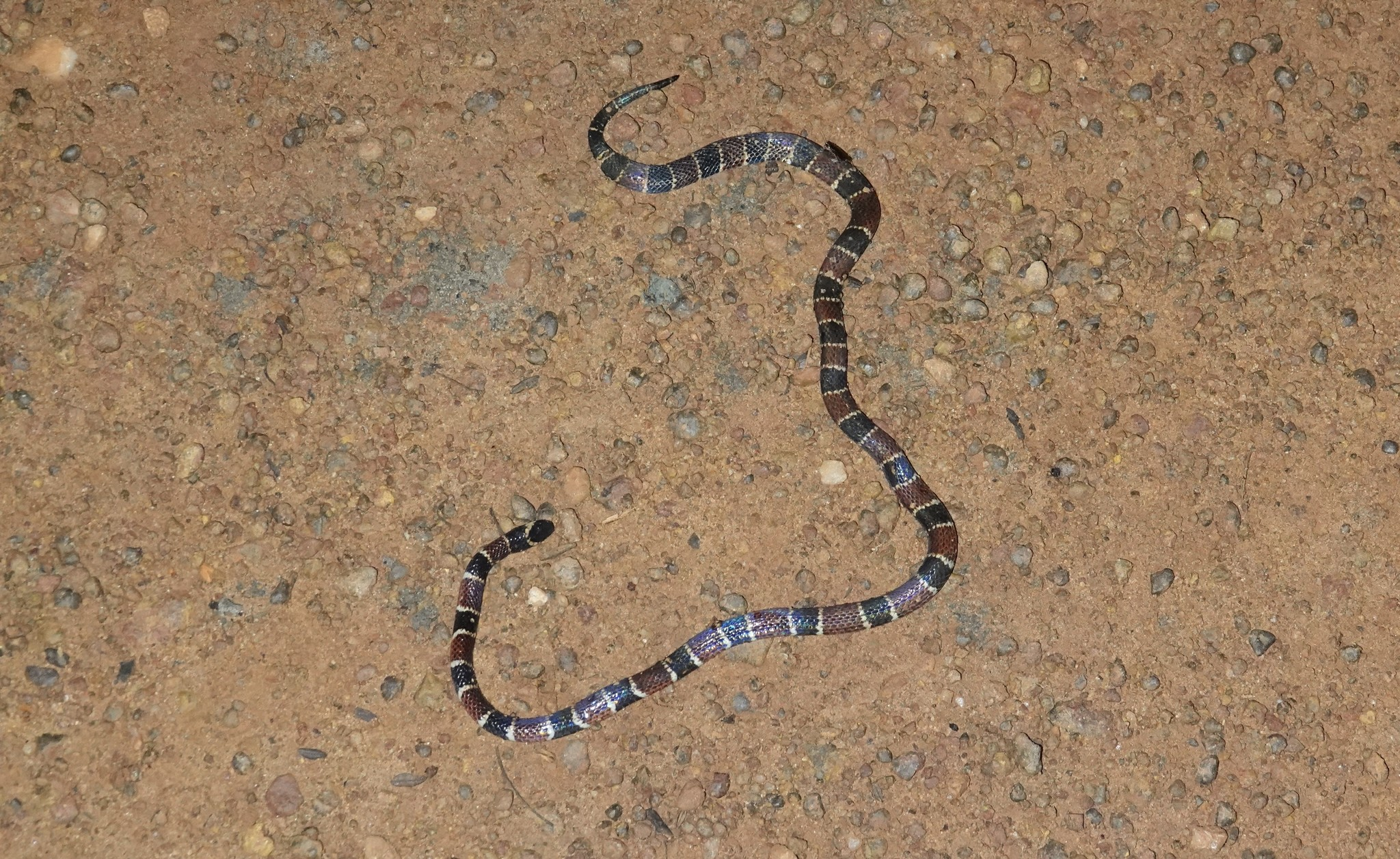

Conservation status
- Least Concern (IUCN 3.1)

Scientific classification
- Kingdom: Animalia
- Phylum: Chordata
- Class: Reptilia
- Order: Squamata
- Suborder: Serpentes
- Family: Elapidae
- Genus: Micrurus
- Species: M. psyches

Binomial name
- Micrurus psyches (Daudin, 1803)
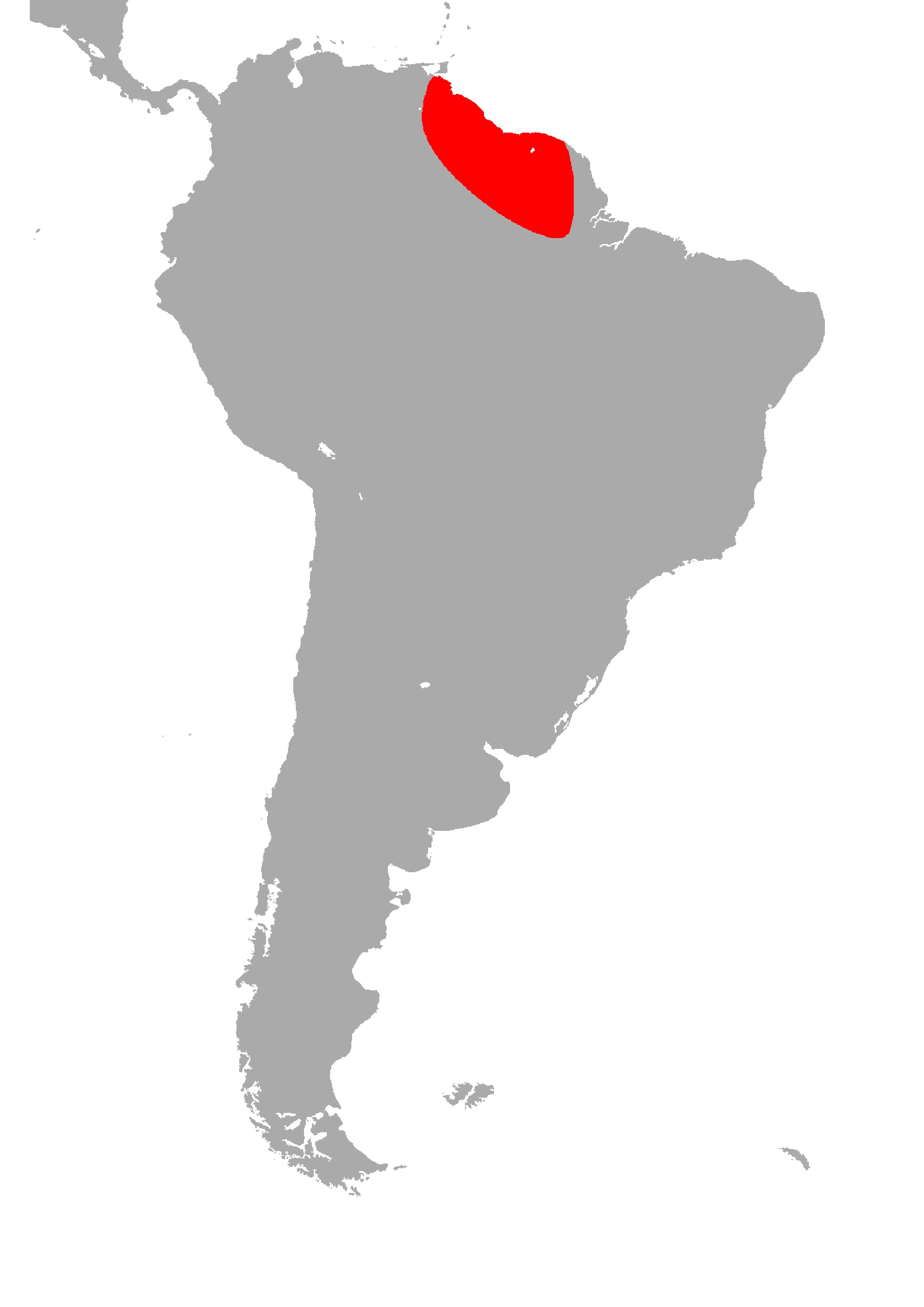

Synonyms
- Vipera psyches Daudin, 1803; Elaps psyches (Daudin, 1803)

= Micrurus psyches =

Species of snake

Micrurus psyches, also known commonly as the Carib coral snake and the northern coral snake, is a species of venomous snake in the family Elapidae. The species is native to northern South America.

== Local common names ==
Local common names for Micrurus psyches include cobra coral do Pará and cobra coral septentrional in Brazilian Portuguese, and coral norteña in South American Spanish.

== Description ==
Micrurus psyches is medium-sized for its genus. Adults usually have a total length (tail included) of 45–60 cm (18–24 in). The maximum recorded total length is 91 cm (36 in).

Like many New World coral snakes, the color pattern consists of red, white (or yellow), and black rings, with the black rings not arranged in triads. Unlike most New World coral snakes, the red rings are very dark, appearing dark brown, purplish, or even black. The "red" rings are 3–7 dorsals and ventrals wide. The white rings are only one dorsal and ventral wide. The black rings are 3–4 dorsals and ventrals wide. Males have 22–29 black rings on the body, and females have 27–41.

Males have 188–196 ventrals and 44–49 subcaudals, and lack supraanal tubercles. Females have 203–212 ventrals and 30–33 subcaudals.

The dorsal scales are arranged in 15 rows at midbody, and the anal plate is divided.

== Geographic distribution ==
Specimens of Micrurus psyches have been identified in northern Brazil, French Guiana, Guyana, Suriname, and southeastern Venezuela.

== Habitat ==
The preferred natural habitat of Micrurus psyches is forest, at elevations from near sea level to 500 m (1,600 ft).

== Behavior ==
Micrurus psyches is terrestrial.

== Diet ==
Micrurus psyches preys predominately upon snakelike lizards of the genus Bachia.

== Reproduction ==
Micrurus psyches is oviparous.
