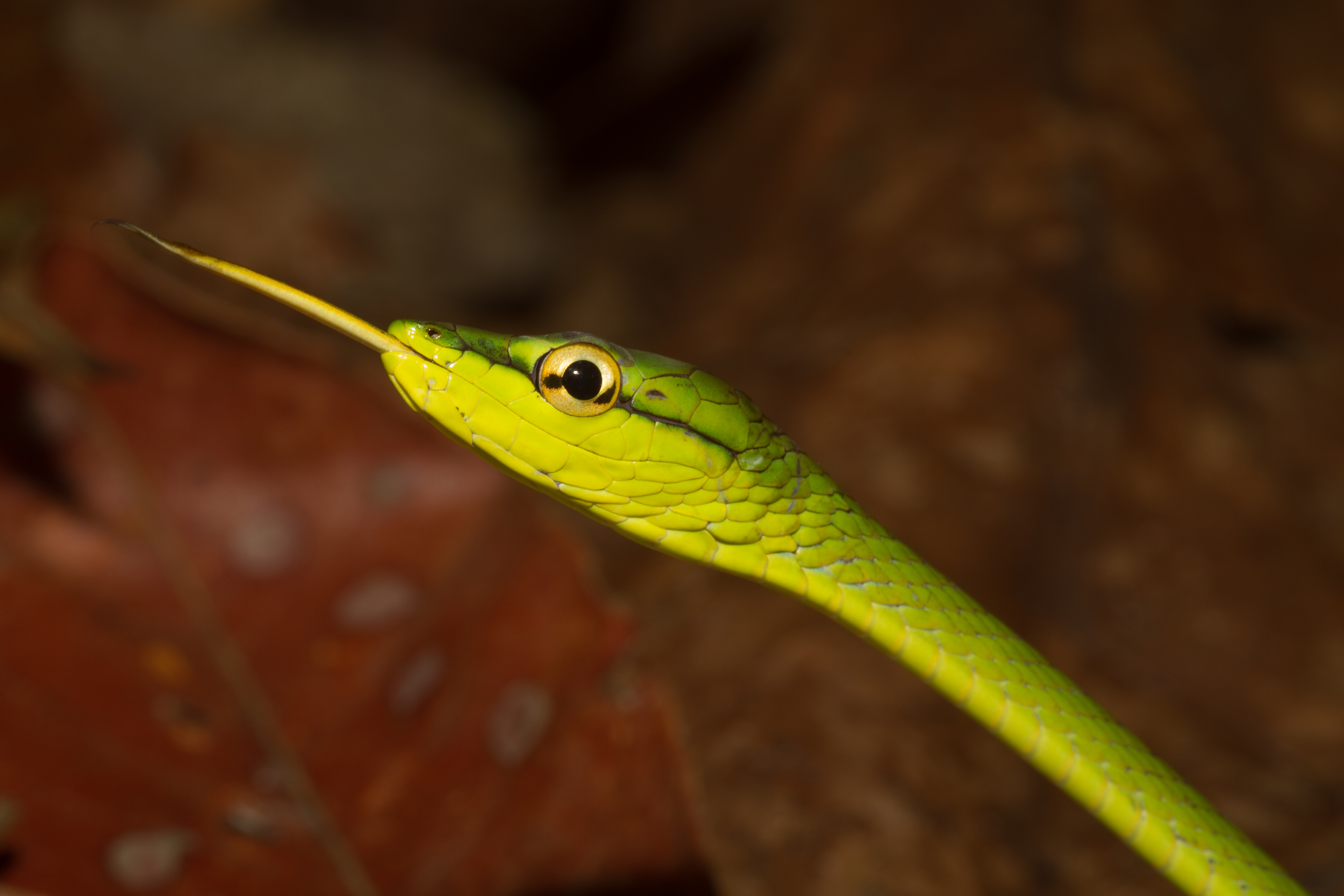

Conservation status
- Least Concern (IUCN 3.1)

Scientific classification
- Kingdom: Animalia
- Phylum: Chordata
- Class: Reptilia
- Order: Squamata
- Suborder: Serpentes
- Family: Colubridae
- Genus: Oxybelis
- Species: O. brevirostris

Binomial name
- Oxybelis brevirostris (Cope, 1861)

= Oxybelis brevirostris =

Species of snake

Oxybelis brevirostris, Cope's vine snake, is a species of snake of the family Colubridae.

The snake is found in Honduras, Nicaragua, Costa Rica, Panama, Colombia, and Ecuador.
