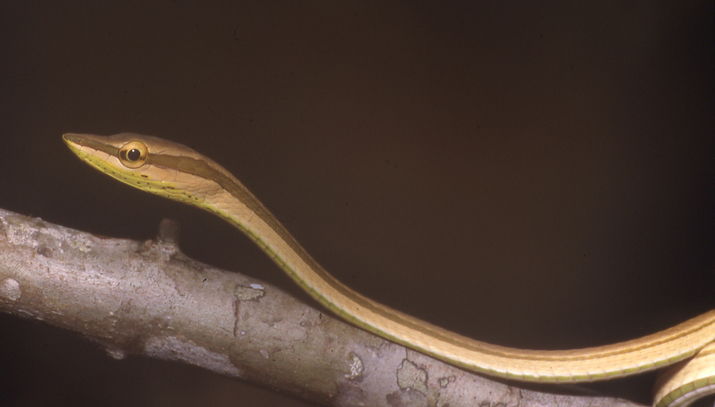
- Xenoxybelis argenteus

Conservation status
- Least Concern (IUCN 3.1)

Scientific classification
- Kingdom: Animalia
- Phylum: Chordata
- Class: Reptilia
- Order: Squamata
- Suborder: Serpentes
- Family: Colubridae
- Genus: Xenoxybelis
- Species: X. argenteus

Binomial name
- Xenoxybelis argenteus (Daudin, 1803)

= Xenoxybelis argenteus =

Species of snake

Xenoxybelis argenteus, the striped sharpnose snake or diurnal vine snake, is a species of snake in the family, Colubridae. It is found in Colombia, Venezuela, Ecuador, Brazil, Guyana, Bolivia, French Guiana, and Suriname.
