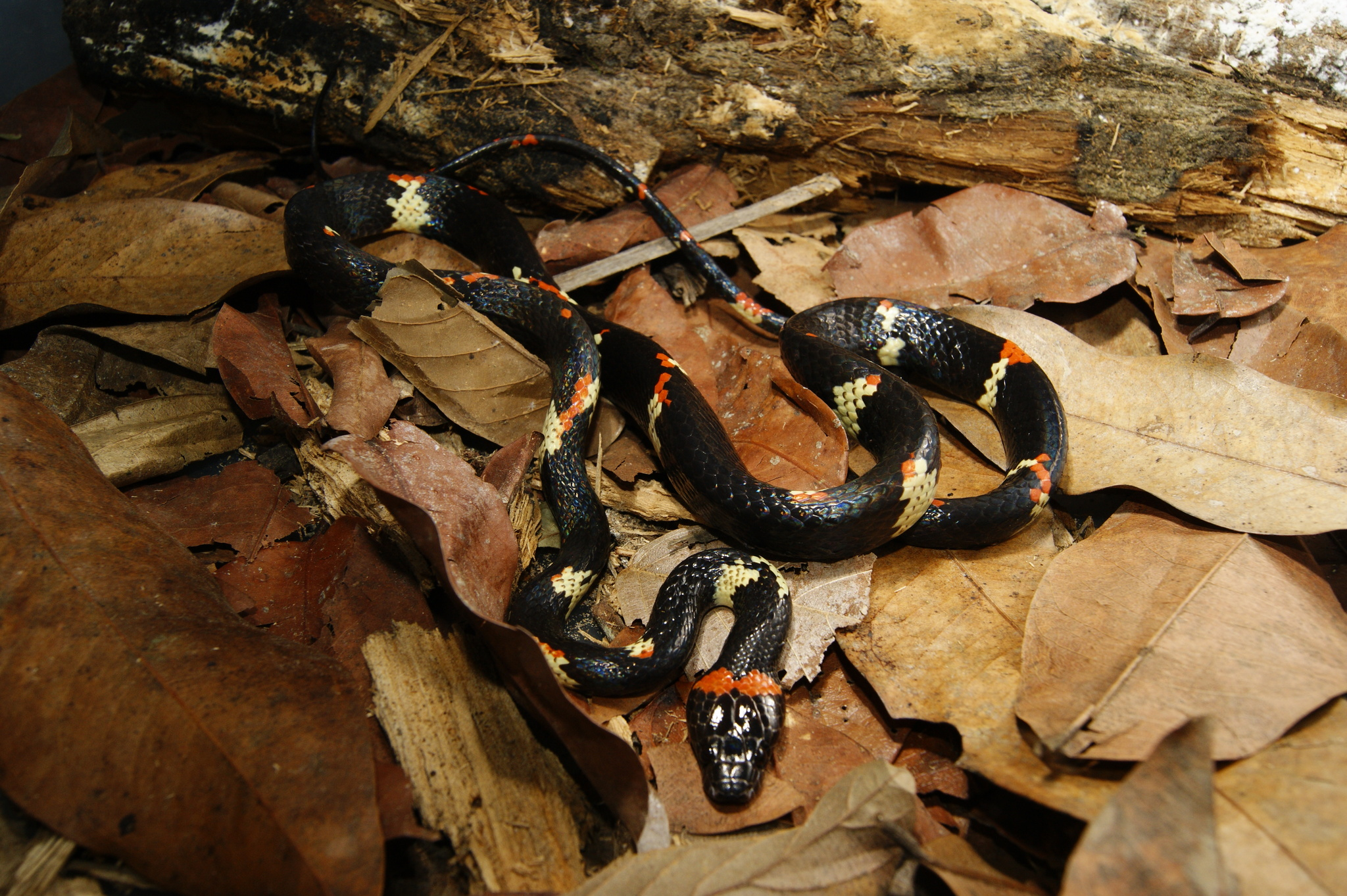

Conservation status
- Least Concern (IUCN 3.1)

Scientific classification
- Kingdom: Animalia
- Phylum: Chordata
- Class: Reptilia
- Order: Squamata
- Suborder: Serpentes
- Family: Colubridae
- Genus: Siphlophis
- Species: S. worontzowi

Binomial name
- Siphlophis worontzowi (Prado, 1940)

= Siphlophis worontzowi =

Species of snake

Siphlophis worontzowi, Worontzow's spotted night snake, is a snake found in Brazil, Peru, and Bolivia.
