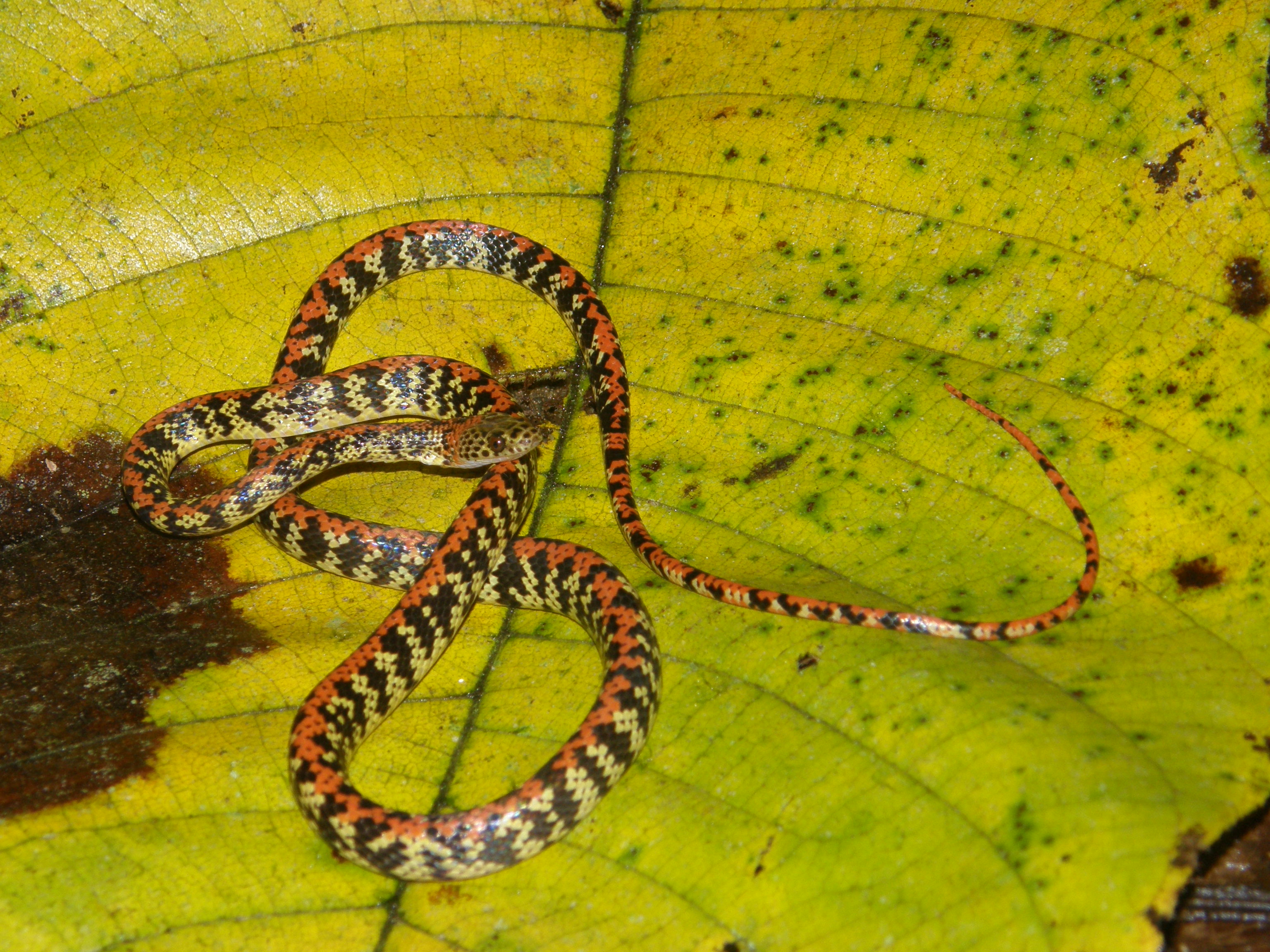

Conservation status
- Least Concern (IUCN 3.1)

Scientific classification
- Domain: Eukaryota
- Kingdom: Animalia
- Phylum: Chordata
- Class: Reptilia
- Order: Squamata
- Suborder: Serpentes
- Family: Colubridae
- Genus: Siphlophis
- Species: S. cervinus

Binomial name
- Siphlophis cervinus Laurenti, 1768

= Siphlophis cervinus =

Species of snake

Siphlophis cervinus, the Panamanian spotted night snake or Panama spotted night snake, is a snake found in Amazonian South America and Trinidad and Tobago.
