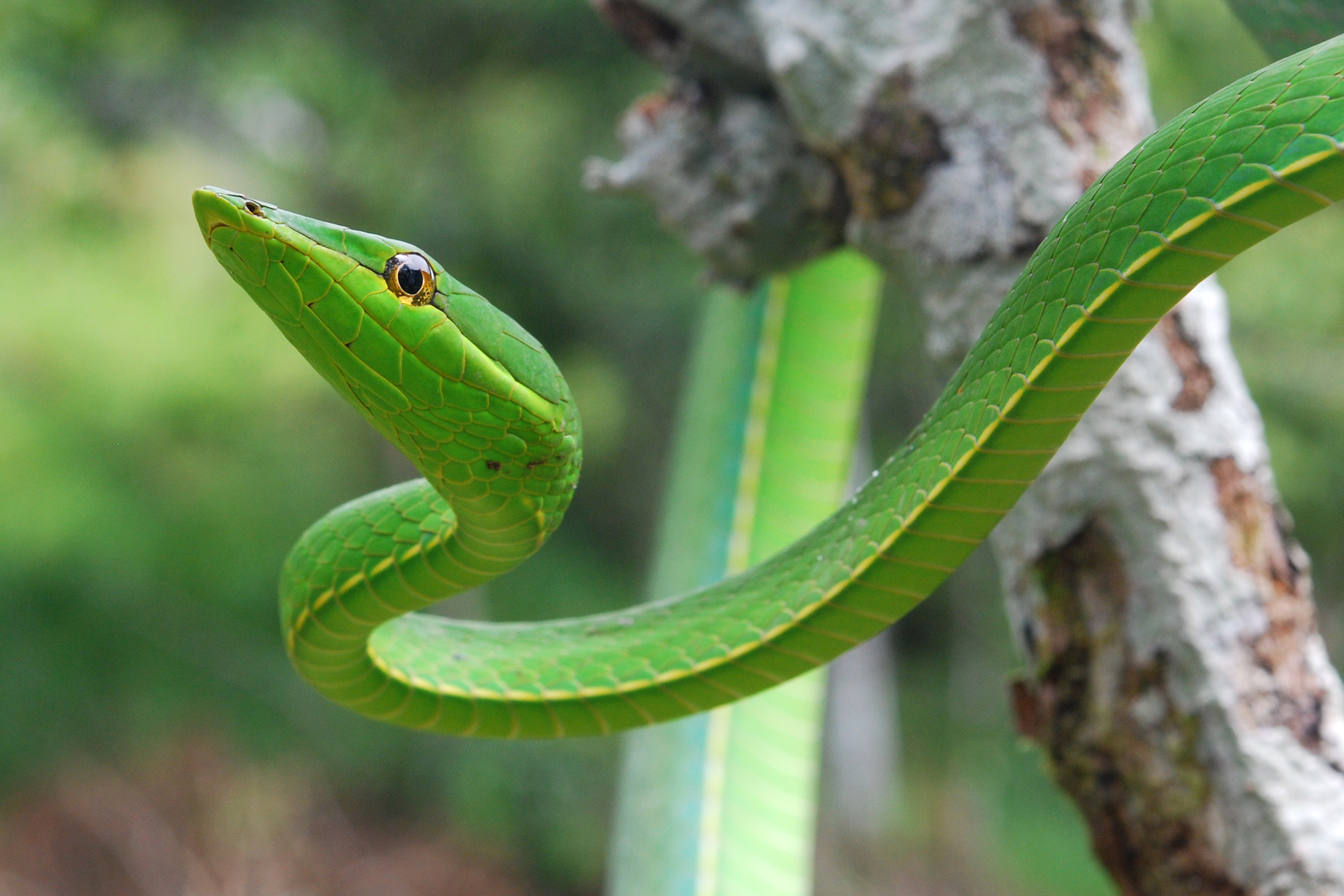
- A green vine snake in Yasuni National Park, Ecuador

Conservation status
- Least Concern (IUCN 3.1)

Scientific classification
- Kingdom: Animalia
- Phylum: Chordata
- Class: Reptilia
- Order: Squamata
- Suborder: Serpentes
- Family: Colubridae
- Genus: Oxybelis
- Species: O. fulgidus

Binomial name
- Oxybelis fulgidus (Daudin, 1803)

Synonyms
- Coluber fulgidus Daudin, 1803; Dryophis fulgidus — Fitzinger, 1826; Oxybelis fulgidus — A.M.C. Duméril & Bibron, 1854

= Oxybelis fulgidus =

Species of snake

Oxybelis fulgidus, commonly known as the green vine snake, is a species of slender, arboreal, opisthoglyphous ('rear-fanged') colubrid serpent which is endemic to Central America and northern South America.

== Common names ==
Common names used in South America for this species include bejuca lora, bejuquilla verde, cobra-cipó, and cobra-bicuda.

== Geographic range ==
Oxybelis fulgidus is found in mainland Latin America, primarily in Belize, Bolivia, Brazil, Colombia, Costa Rica, Ecuador, El Salvador, French Guiana, Guatemala, Guyana, Honduras, Mexico, Nicaragua, Panama, Peru, Suriname and Venezuela.

== Description ==
This snake is very slender, roughly 2 cm (0.79 in) thick, and may attain a total length of about 1.5–2 m (59–79 in). The tail is long and very delicate, but mostly used to hold on while reaching for prey. The head is aerodynamically shaped and very pointy, the mouth is very large and extends almost the whole length of the head. The tongue is long and green; when in use it is kept outside the mouth and moved up and down. This behavior is reflected in other species of vine snake and it is believed that they are using their tongues as sights the way a cat uses its whiskers, as they move very quickly through branches and brush.

It is bright green dorsally, and yellowish green ventrally and on the upper lip. There is a narrow yellowish-white stripe along each side of the belly and tail.

Snout very prominent, about three times as long as the diameter of the eye. No loreal, prefrontal contacting 2 or 3 upper labials. 9–10 upper labials, 4th, 5th, and 6th (or 5th, 6th, and 7th) entering the eye. Temporals very large, 1 + 2.

Dorsal scales weakly keeled, arranged in 17 rows at midbody. Ventrals 198–217; anal plate divided; subcaudals 139–165, also divided.

== Catching prey ==
An almost exclusively arboreal (tree-dwelling) species, the green vine snake remains high above the ground on tree branches, staring down awaiting any passing small animals. When an appropriately-sized rodent, lizard, frog, bird, or other small animal is spotted, the snake follows it for a short distance, carefully analyzing the smells of the potential prey, and surrounding area, with its tongue. If the snake has successfully stalked its desired quarry, it will attack, usually by biting into the head or back of the neck before lifting the prey 20–40 cm (8–15.5 in) off of the ground. The snake will also typically coil around its prey, albeit not in a constrictor-like fashion, to further subdue and control it.

The vine snake is an opisthoglyphous (or "rear-fanged") species that possesses two larger, but blunted, peg-like teeth at the upper back of the mouth, which are slightly grooved on the sides to allow for delivery of a toxic salival fluid. Designed to quickly immobilize small animals, this salival fluid ensures the sufficient dispatching of prey and prevents the animal from retaliating and potentially wounding, or even killing, the snake. Then it is quickly swallowed. Once the prey is completely swallowed within the vine snake's body, it typically searches for a new resting place, usually at the highest point of a tree.

The "venom" contained in the salival fluids of O. fulgidus is fast-acting on small animals, but has little to no effect on humans. Envenomation of human beings is rare, as the location and structure of the blunt teeth, at the rear of the mouth, requires the snake to willingly grab-hold and "chew-in" its toxic saliva (something most people will not stand for). In the rare instances of reported human bites, slight tingling or temporary numbness at the site of the bite is reported. As with all venomous creatures, serious allergic reactions are possible, and most potential allergies are not known or even diagnosed prior to a bite. Thus, respecting these snakes is of utmost importance, as with any reptile species; when handling vine snakes, care should be taken to not corner, irritate or scare the animals, potentially triggering a defensive bite.

== Behavior in captivity ==
Vine snakes must be kept in large terrariums with a height of at least 2 m (79 in) and a surface of 6–16 square meters (65–172 square feet). The behavior towards humans is neutral and the snake usually goes to the other end of the terrarium. Some adapt very well and even come closer. Unlike their Asian look-alikes, these snakes will readily take mice and some are even large enough to eat rats. This fact makes them a prized choice among reptile collectors. Captive life spans are estimated at 9–15 years.

== Images ==
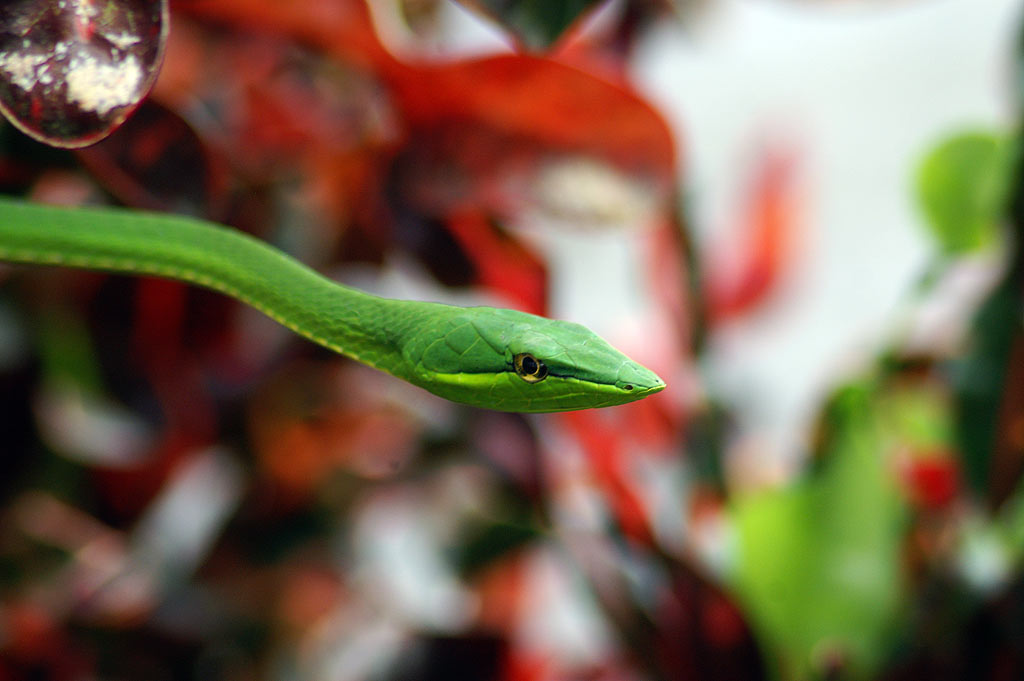
Oxybelis fulgidus in Tortuguero National Park, Limón, Costa Rica

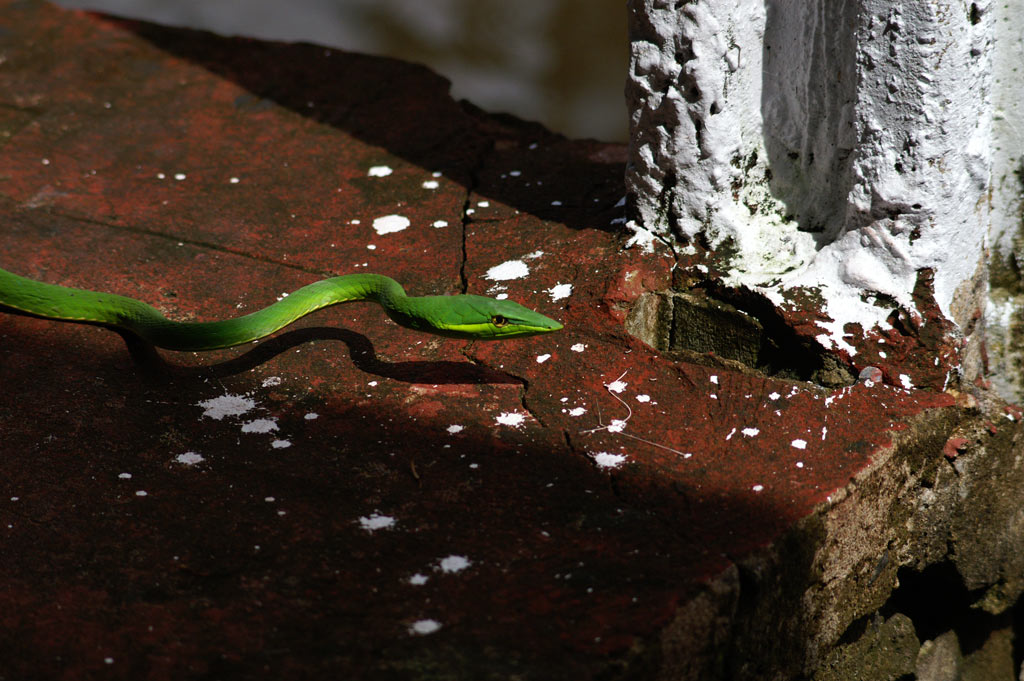
O. fulgidus in Tortuguero N.P., Costa Rica

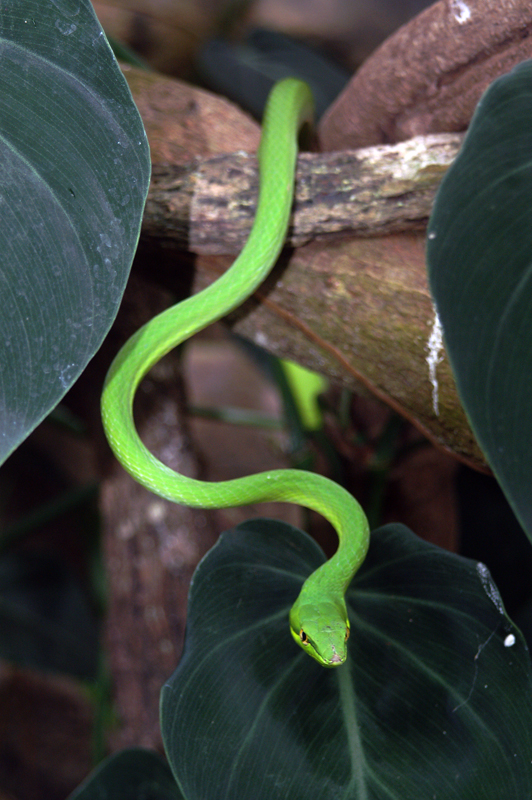
O. fulgidus in Cahuita, Limón, Costa Rica

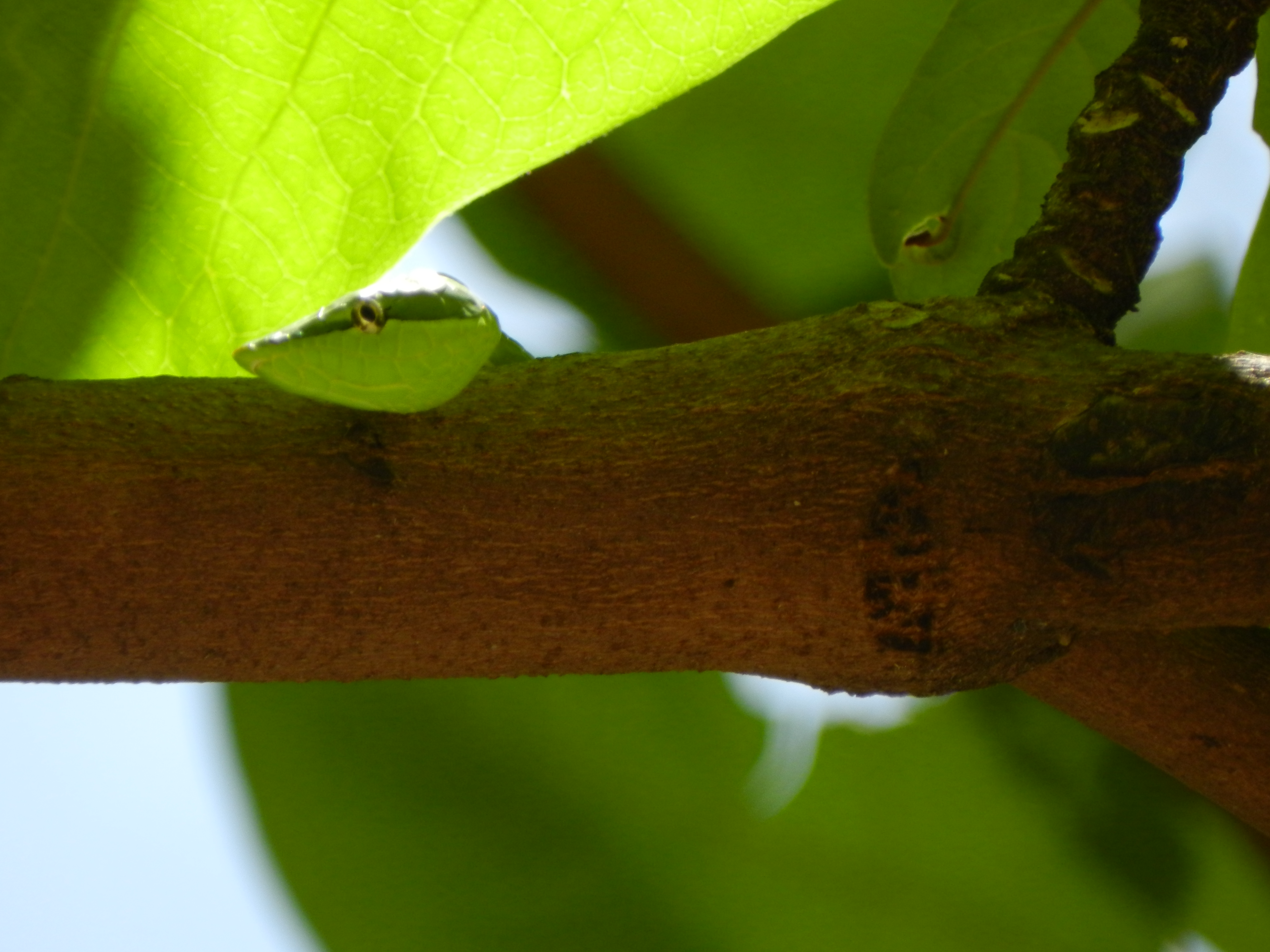
Close-up of head of O. fulgidus ("culebra chocoya", locally), in El Crucero, Managua, Nicaragua

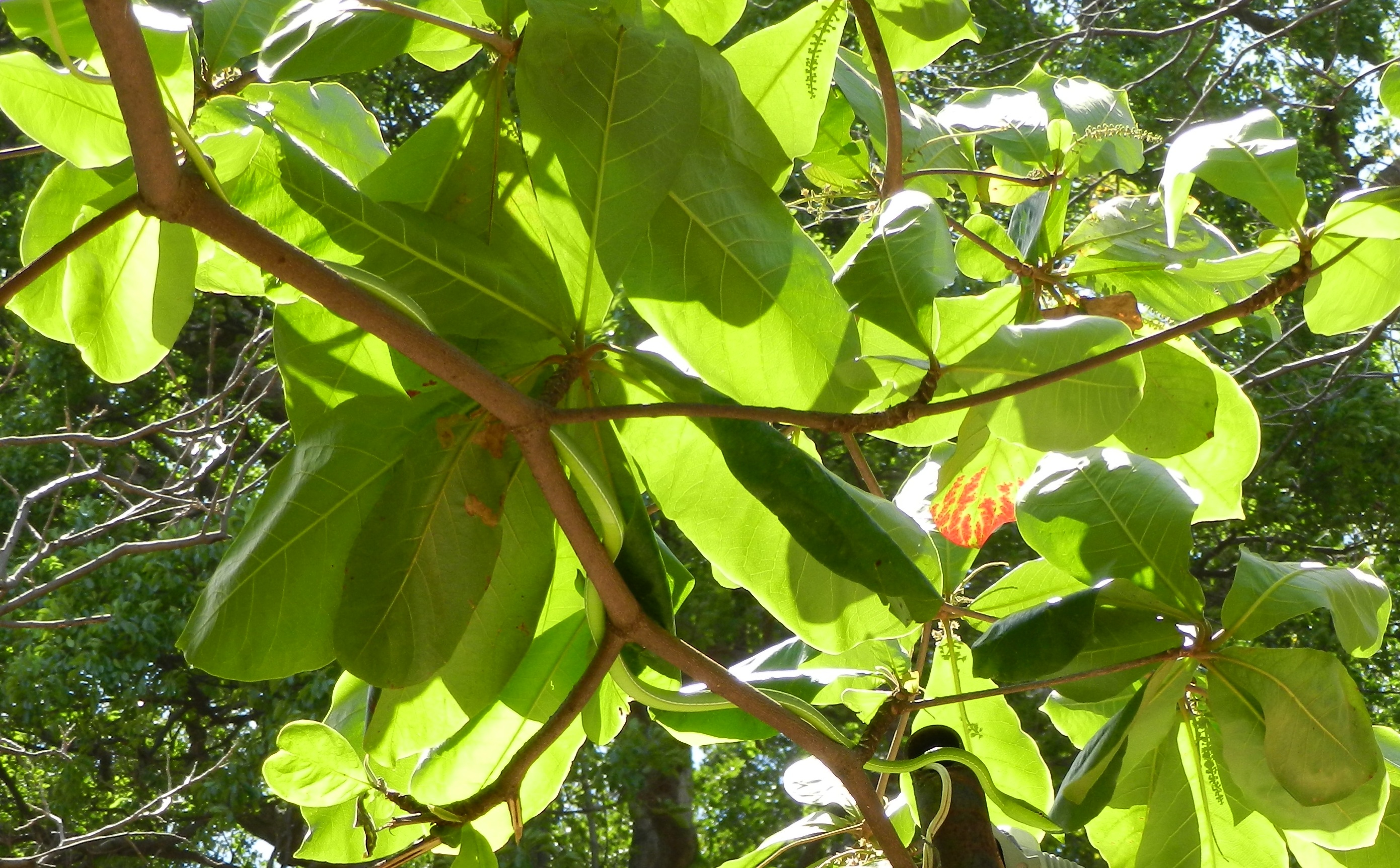
O. fulgidus on a branch of tropical almond (Terminalia catappa), El Crucero, Managua, Nicaragua

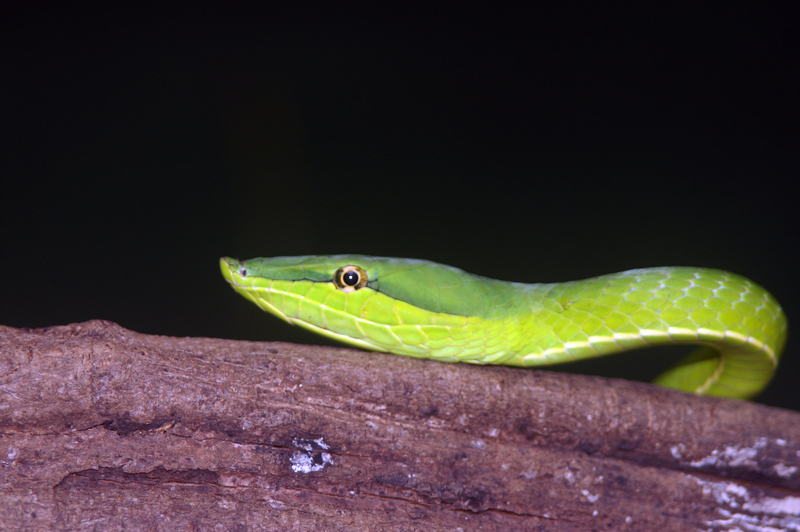
Close-up of head of O. fulgidus
