= Oxybelis vittatus =

Scientific classification
- Kingdom: Animalia
- Phylum: Chordata
- Class: Reptilia
- Order: Squamata
- Suborder: Serpentes
- Family: Colubridae
- Genus: Oxybelis
- Species: O. vittatus

Binomial name
- Oxybelis vittatus (Girard, 1854)

Species of snake

Oxybelis vittatus is a species of snake of the family Colubridae.

The snake is found in Panama.
