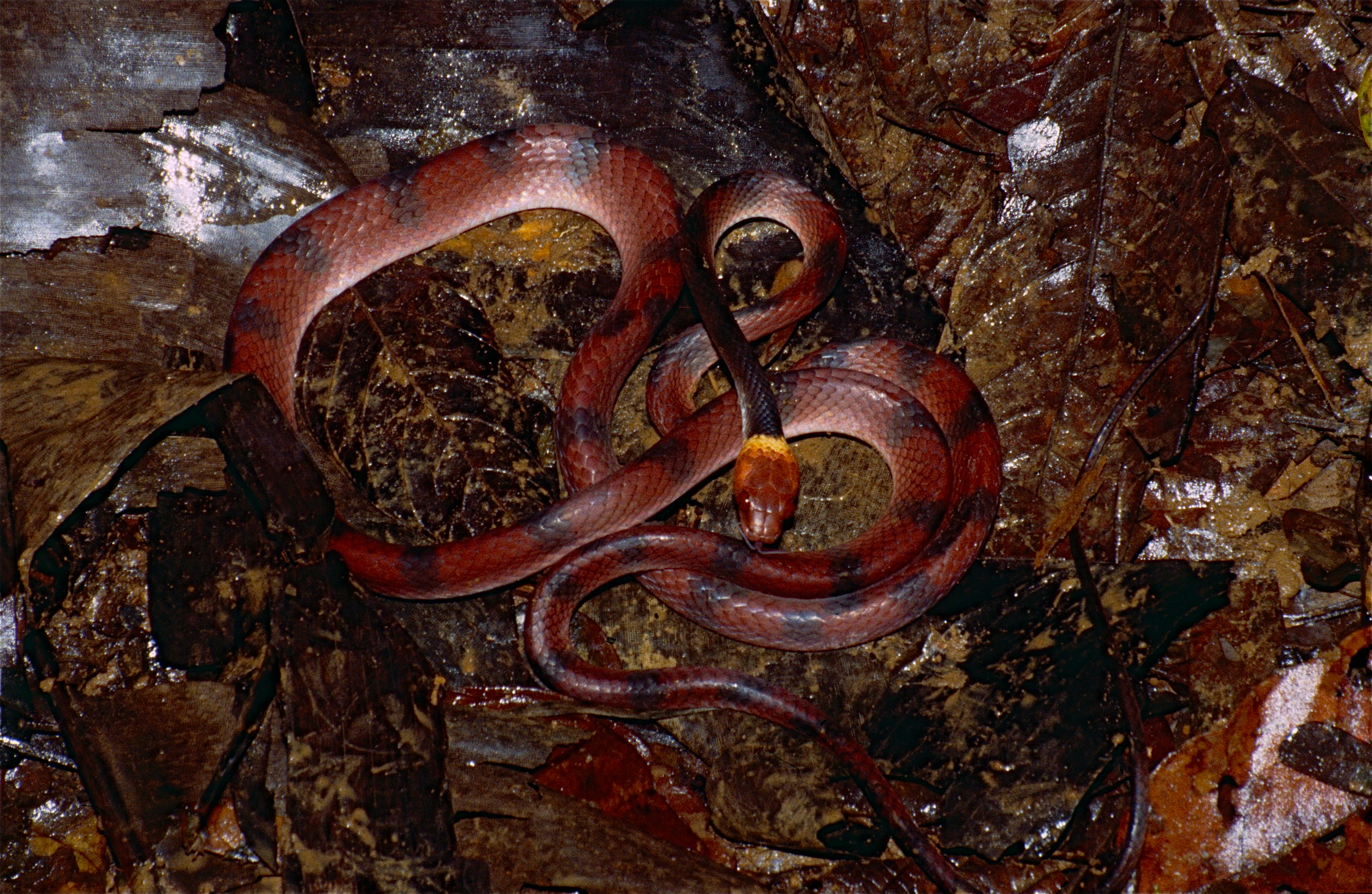

Conservation status
- Least Concern (IUCN 3.1)

Scientific classification
- Kingdom: Animalia
- Phylum: Chordata
- Class: Reptilia
- Order: Squamata
- Suborder: Serpentes
- Family: Colubridae
- Genus: Siphlophis
- Species: S. compressus

Binomial name
- Siphlophis compressus (Daudin, 1803)

Synonyms
- Tripanurgos compressus Daudin, 1803

= Siphlophis compressus =

Species of snake

Siphlophis compressus the tropical flat snake, is a snake found in tropical Central and South America and Trinidad and Tobago. It feeds on small lizards, other snakes, small mammals and probably on frogs and nestling birds, as well as the eggs of nesting birds and lizards.

== Bibliography ==
Boos, Hans E.A. (2001). The snakes of Trinidad and Tobago. Texas A&M University Press, College Station, TX. ISBN 1-58544-116-3.
