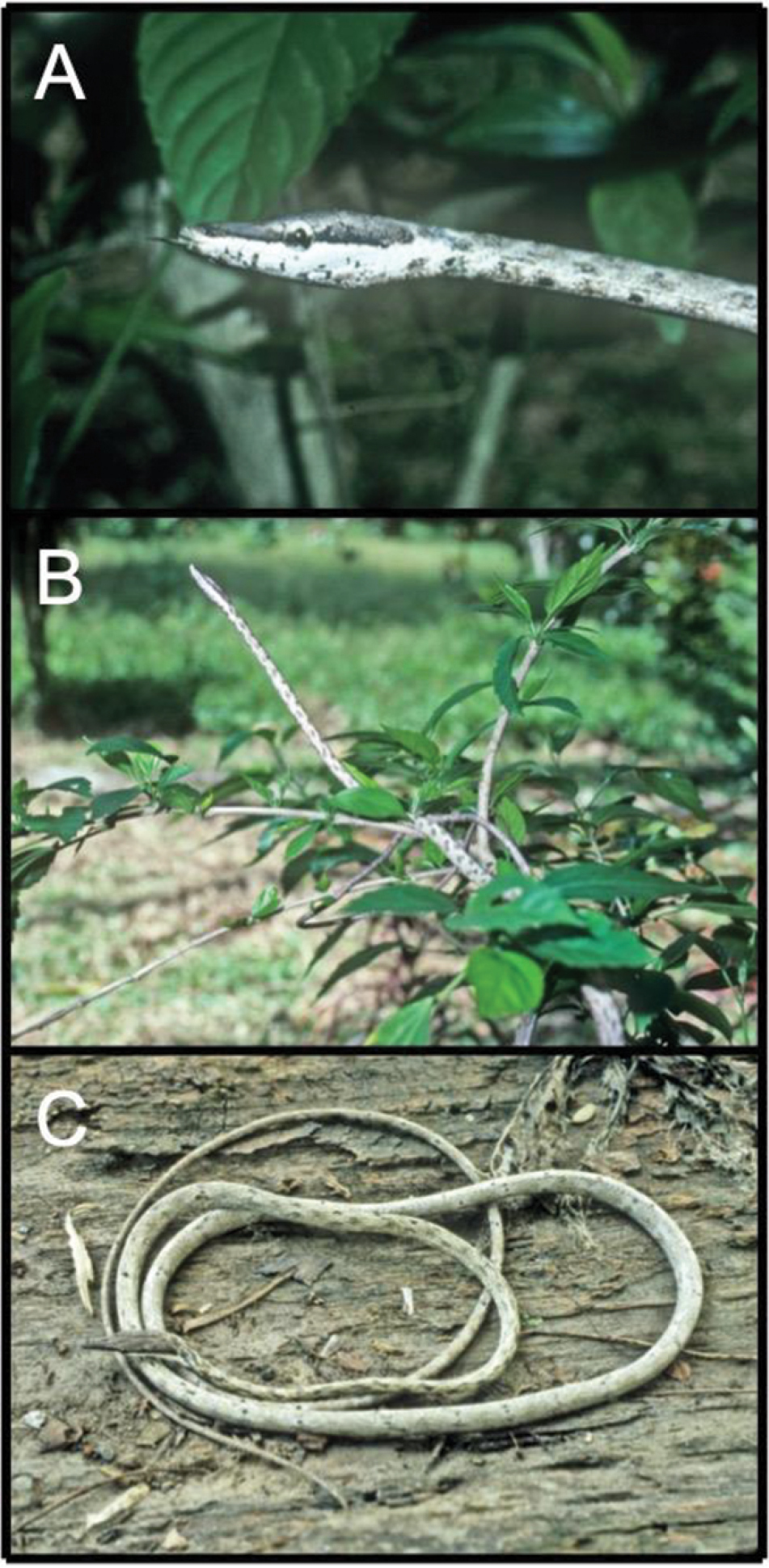

Scientific classification
- Kingdom: Animalia
- Phylum: Chordata
- Class: Reptilia
- Order: Squamata
- Suborder: Serpentes
- Family: Colubridae
- Genus: Oxybelis
- Species: O. inkaterra

Binomial name
- Oxybelis inkaterra Jadin, Jowers, Orlofske, Duellman, Blair, & Murphy, 2021

= Oxybelis inkaterra =

Species of snake

Oxybelis inkaterra, the Inkaterra vine snake, is a species of snake of the family Colubridae. Formally described in 2021, it is named after the ecotourism company Inkaterra, which owns and operates the reserve in which the holotype was collected. It has a grayish-tan body with dark brown flecks and streaks, a dark brown lateral stripe on the head bordered below by white, brown crown, and black mouth. It is endemic to South America, where it is known from Peru, Bolivia, and Ecuador.

== Taxonomy ==
Oxybelis inkaterra was formally described in 2021 based on an adult male specimen collected from near Jaumave in the Reserva Amazónica in Madre de Dios, Peru. The species is named after the ecotourism company Inkaterra, which owns and operates the reserve in which the holotype was collected. The species has the English common name Inkaterra vine snake and the Spanish common name Inkaterra Serpiente de vid.

== Description ==
The dorsum and venter are grayish-tan with dark brown flecks and streaks. The top of the head is brown, with a dark brown lateral stripe on the head bordered below by white. The iris is cream-colored, with a horizontal dark brown stripe. The lining of the mouth and throat is black.

Oxybelis inkaterra can be distinguished from the other species in the Oxybelis aeneus complex by a combination of characteristics. The upper labials three and four are in contact with the preocular scale. The head has an irregular, darkly pigmented ventral surface with pale spots. There are eyespot markings on the posterior ventral surface of the body and tail. The snout is relatively short and broad compared to other species complex. The dorsum is dirty cream with black flecking instead of brown-gray as in the rest of the complex.

== Distribution and ecology ==
Oxybelis inkaterra is endemic to South America, where it is known from Peru, Bolivia, and Ecuador. This species occurs in the Amazonian rainforest of Peru in the departments of Huánuco, Loreto, and Madre de Dios. It is likely the species also occurs in Ucayali between these departments. In Bolivia, it is known from Carrasco National Park in Cochabamba Department and Madidi National Park in La Paz Department. In Ecuador, it has been recorded in Mera County in Pastaza Province. It may also occur in Brazil and Colombia.

When threatened, they have been observed to stay motionless and mimic branches. The function of its ventral eyespots is unclear, but they may deter predators or help in camouflage.
