= Oxybelis potosiensis =

Scientific classification
- Kingdom: Animalia
- Phylum: Chordata
- Class: Reptilia
- Order: Squamata
- Suborder: Serpentes
- Family: Colubridae
- Genus: Oxybelis
- Species: O. potosiensis

Binomial name
- Oxybelis potosiensis Taylor, 1941

Species of snake

Oxybelis potosiensis, the Gulf Coast vine snake, is a species of snake of the family Colubridae.

The snake is found in Belize and Mexico.
