= Oxybelis koehleri =

Scientific classification
- Kingdom: Animalia
- Phylum: Chordata
- Class: Reptilia
- Order: Squamata
- Suborder: Serpentes
- Family: Colubridae
- Genus: Oxybelis
- Species: O. koehleri

Binomial name
- Oxybelis koehleri Jadin, Blair, Orlofske, Jowers, Rivas, Vitt, Ray, Smith, & Murphy, 2020

Species of snake

Oxybelis koehleri, Köhler's vine snake, is a species of snake of the family Colubridae.

It is found in Guatemala, Honduras, El Salvador, Nicaragua, and Costa Rica.
