= Oxybelis wilsoni =

Conservation status
- Endangered (IUCN 3.1)

Scientific classification
- Kingdom: Animalia
- Phylum: Chordata
- Class: Reptilia
- Order: Squamata
- Suborder: Serpentes
- Family: Colubridae
- Genus: Oxybelis
- Species: O. wilsoni

Binomial name
- Oxybelis wilsoni Villa & McCranie, 1995

Species of snake

Oxybelis wilsoni, the Roatan vine snake, is a species of snake of the family Colubridae.

The snake is found on Roatán in Honduras.
