= Hyla surinamensis =

Scientific classification
- Domain: Eukaryota
- Kingdom: Animalia
- Phylum: Chordata
- Class: Amphibia
- Order: Anura
- Family: Hylidae
- Subfamily: Hylinae
- Genus: Hyla
- Species: H. surinamensis

Binomial name
- Hyla surinamensis Daudin, 1802

Synonyms
- Calamita surinamensis — Merrem, 1820

Species of amphibian

Hyla surinamensis is a species of frog that was described by Francois-Marie Daudin based on an illustration of a frog from "Suriname". Probably depicting some species in the treefrog subfamily Hylinae, it is considered a nomen dubium.

This taxon was assessed as "data deficient" for The IUCN Red List of Threatened Species in 2004. As of 2020, it is no longer included in the list.
