= Xenoxybelis boulengeri =

Conservation status
- Least Concern (IUCN 3.1)

Scientific classification
- Kingdom: Animalia
- Phylum: Chordata
- Class: Reptilia
- Order: Squamata
- Suborder: Serpentes
- Family: Colubridae
- Genus: Xenoxybelis
- Species: X. boulengeri

Binomial name
- Xenoxybelis boulengeri (Procter, 1923)

Species of snake

Xenoxybelis boulengeri, the southern sharpnose snake, is a species of snake in the family, Colubridae. It is found in Brazil, Peru, and Bolivia.
