= Siphlophis ayauma =

Conservation status
- Least Concern (IUCN 3.1)

Scientific classification
- Kingdom: Animalia
- Phylum: Chordata
- Class: Reptilia
- Order: Squamata
- Suborder: Serpentes
- Family: Colubridae
- Genus: Siphlophis
- Species: S. ayauma

Binomial name
- Siphlophis ayauma Sheehy, Yánez-Muñoz, Valencia, & E.N. Smith, 2014

Species of snake

Siphlophis ayauma, the Devil's Head spotted night snake, is a snake found in Ecuador.
