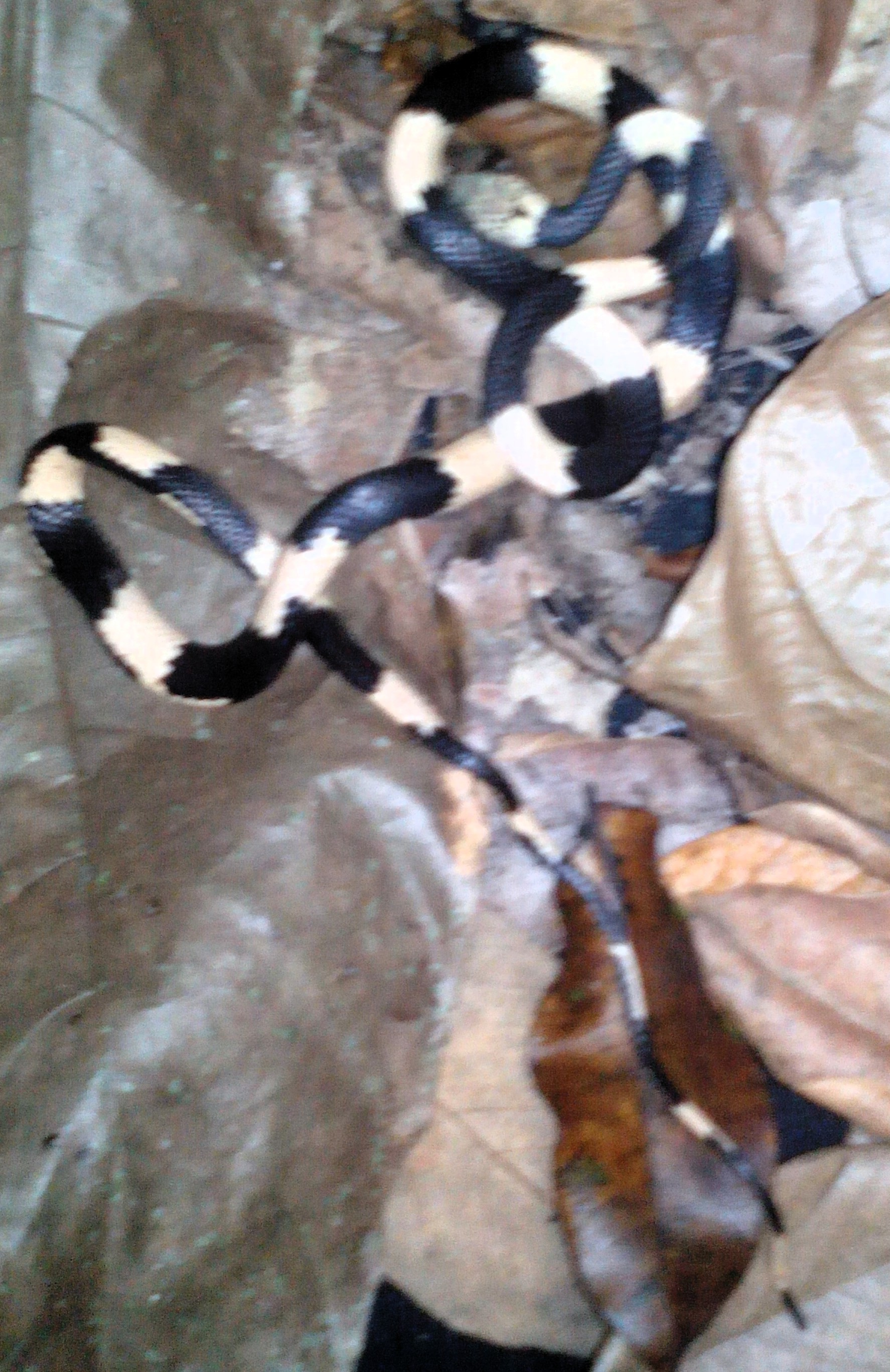

Conservation status
- Least Concern (IUCN 3.1)

Scientific classification
- Kingdom: Animalia
- Phylum: Chordata
- Class: Reptilia
- Order: Squamata
- Suborder: Serpentes
- Family: Colubridae
- Genus: Siphlophis
- Species: S. leucocephalus

Binomial name
- Siphlophis leucocephalus (Günther, 1863)

= Siphlophis leucocephalus =

Species of snake

Siphlophis leucocephalus, commonly known as the common spotted night snake, is a species of snake of the family Colubridae. It is endemic to southeastern Brazil and known from Bahia, Goiás, and Minas Gerais states.
