= Siphlophis pulcher =

Conservation status
- Least Concern (IUCN 3.1)

Scientific classification
- Kingdom: Animalia
- Phylum: Chordata
- Class: Reptilia
- Order: Squamata
- Suborder: Serpentes
- Family: Colubridae
- Genus: Siphlophis
- Species: S. pulcher

Binomial name
- Siphlophis pulcher (Raddi, 1820)

Species of snake

Siphlophis pulcher, the Guanabara spotted night snake, is a snake found in Brazil.
