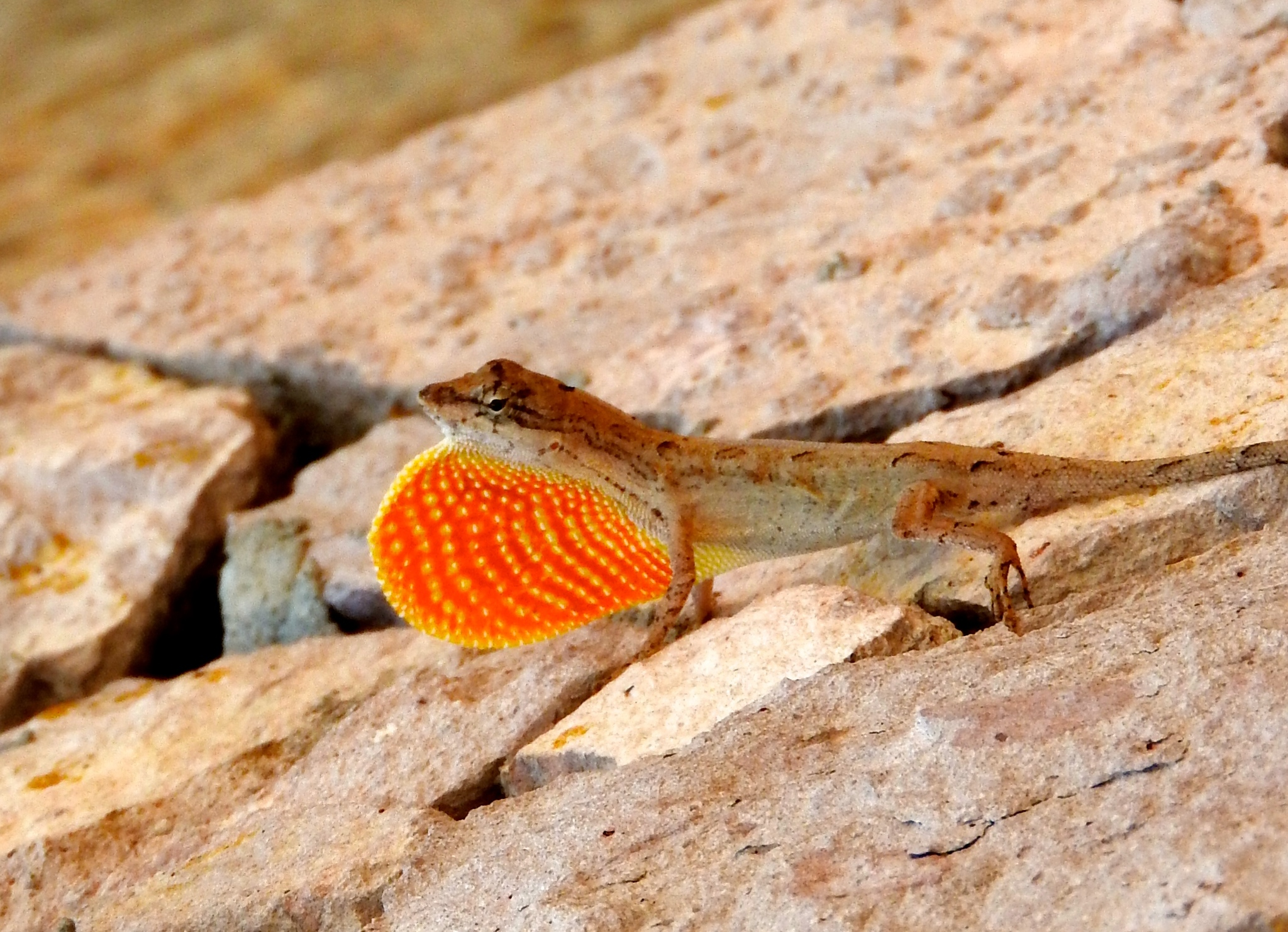

Conservation status
- Least Concern (IUCN 3.1)

Scientific classification
- Kingdom: Animalia
- Phylum: Chordata
- Class: Reptilia
- Order: Squamata
- Suborder: Iguania
- Family: Dactyloidae
- Genus: Anolis
- Species: A. nebulosus

Binomial name
- Anolis nebulosus (Wiegmann, 1834)

= Anolis nebulosus =

Species of lizard

Anolis nebulosus, the clouded anole, is a species of lizard in the family Dactyloidae. The species is found in Mexico.

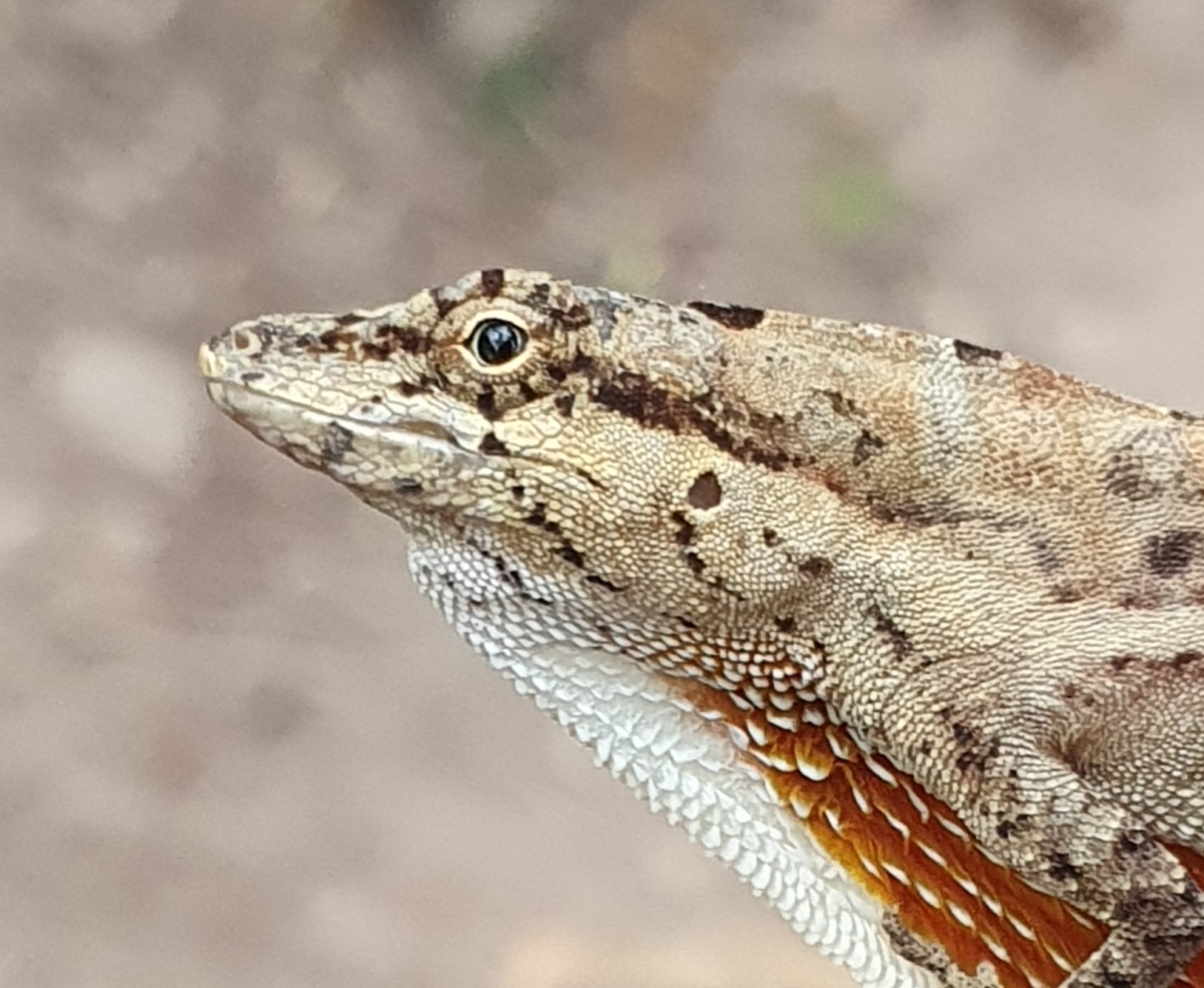
Dewlap retracted

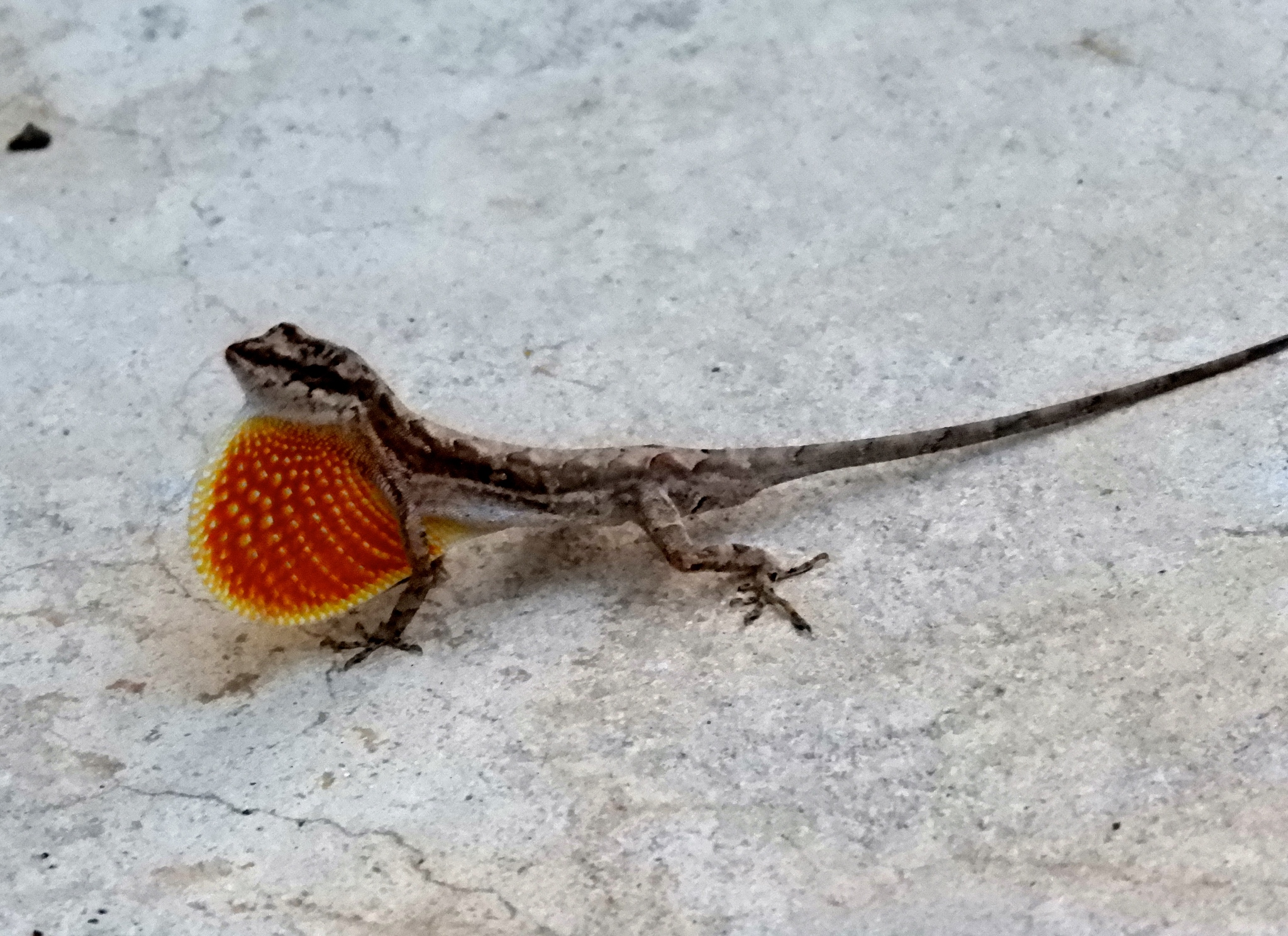
Dewlap extended

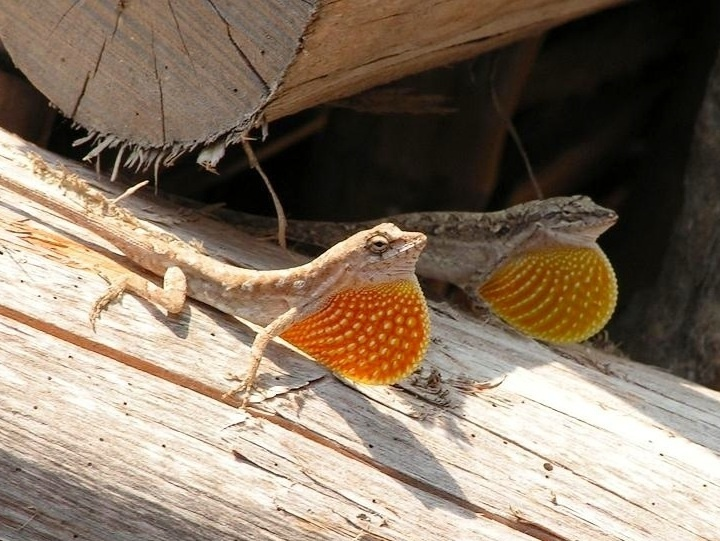
Display

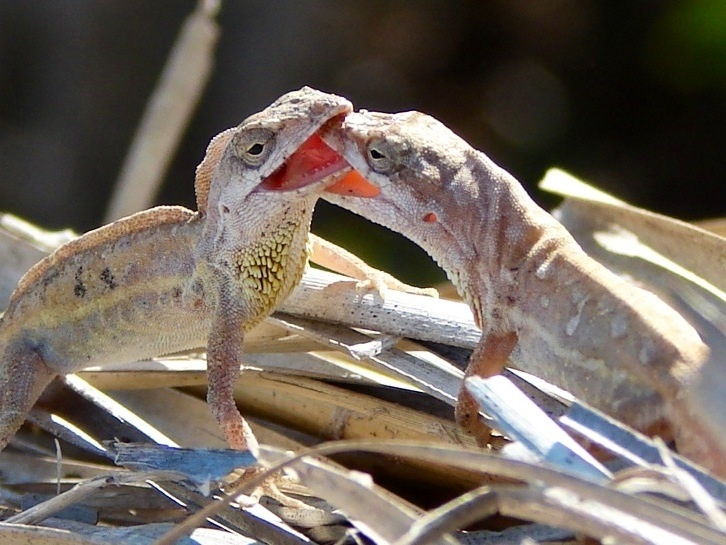
Fight
