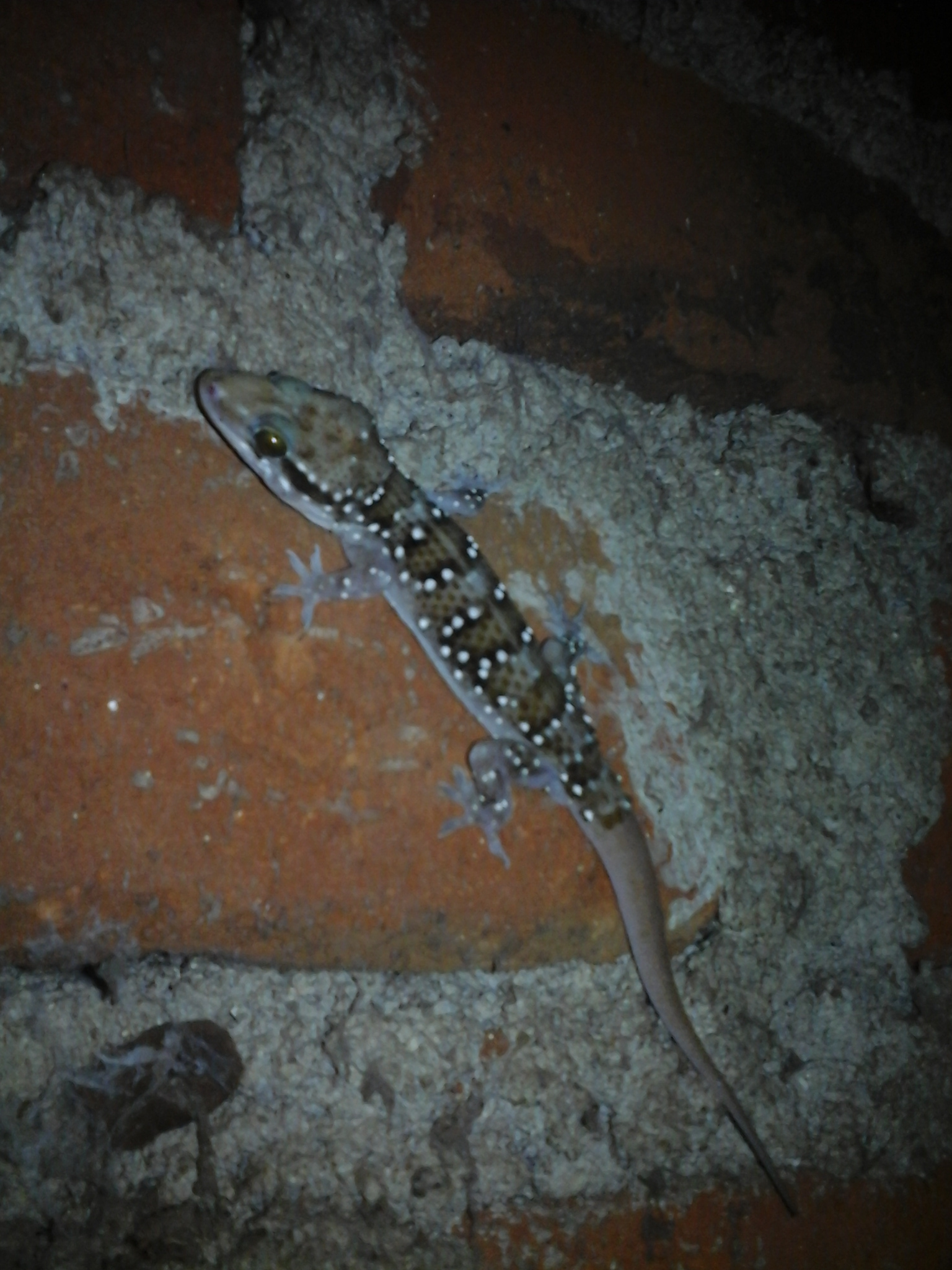

Scientific classification
- Kingdom: Animalia
- Phylum: Chordata
- Class: Reptilia
- Order: Squamata
- Suborder: Gekkota
- Family: Gekkonidae
- Genus: Hemidactylus
- Species: H. lankae

Binomial name
- Hemidactylus lankae Deraniyagala, 1953

= Hemidactylus lankae =

Termite-hill gecko

Species of lizard

Hemidactylus lankae (termite-hill gecko, Sri Lanka leaf-toed gecko) is a species of gecko endemic to island of Sri Lanka.

== Habitat and distribution ==
H. lankae are dark-light banded ground geckos from the dry zone of Sri Lanka, below 300m. Known from localities including Kandalama, Dambulla, Giritale, Bakamuna, Puttalam, Wilpattu National Park, and Menikdena.

== Description ==
Head large. An indistinct lateral skin fold present. Forehead and back covered with large 16-18 rows of convex tubercles. Male are with 13-19 pre-ano-femoral pores. Dorsum yellowish-olive, with three large brown saddle-like patches, edged with black. Head is with yellow stripes from behind the eye and across nape. Venter unpatterned creamy. Tail dark banded.

== Ecology and diet ==
Inhabits open forests and shrublands. A nocturnal and terrestrial gecko, it shelters during the day in rock cracks, under bark and in rodent burrows. Diet comprises termites, and also crickets, grasshoppers, spiders, and beetles, and they known to congregate on termitaria with swarming termite alates.

== Reproduction ==
Clutched comprise 2, and may 6, measuring 10 * 12mm, which laid between May and July. Hatchlings are 22mm long.
