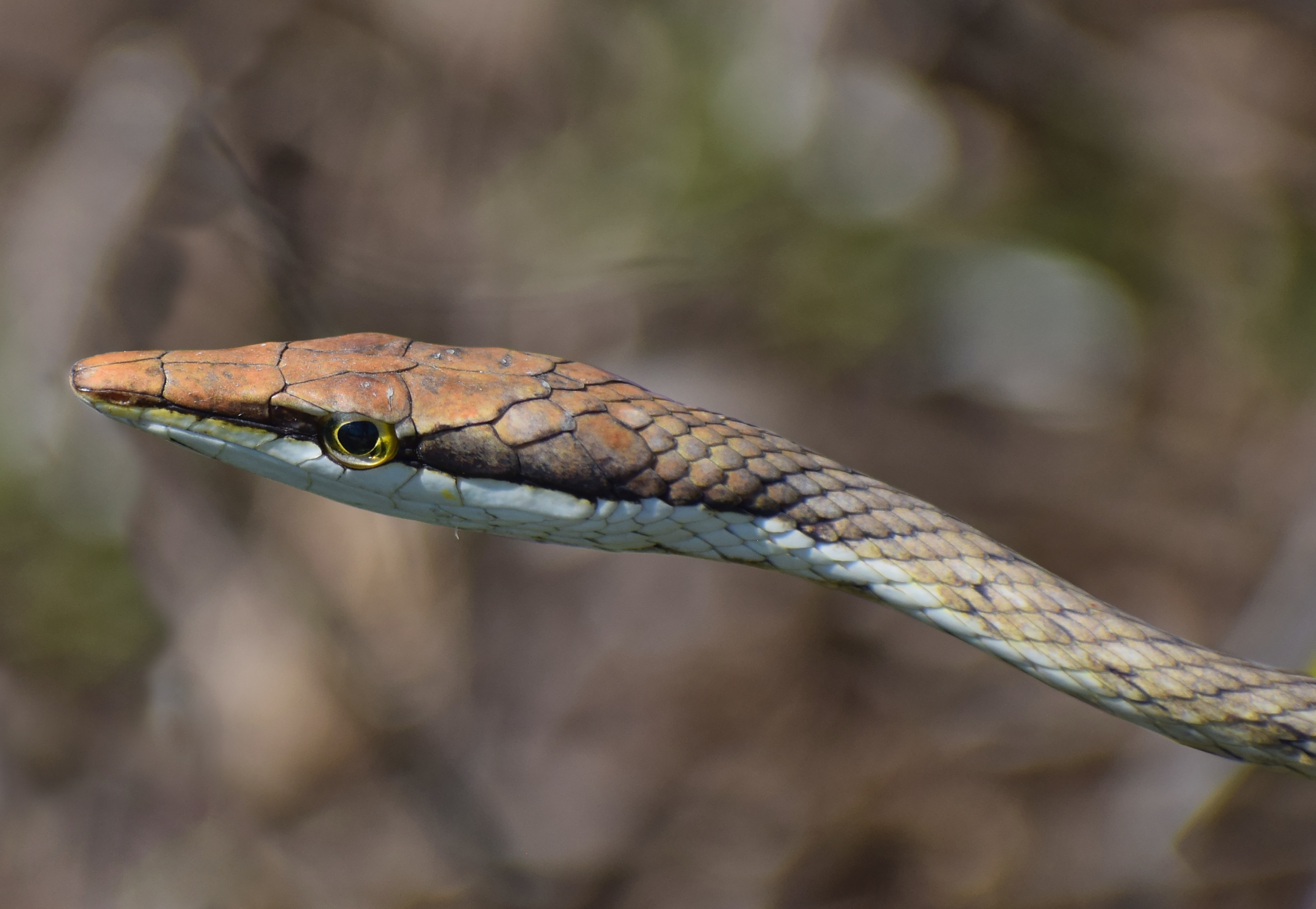
- Mexican vine snake in the El Palmar ecological reserve (Yucatán, Mexico)

Conservation status
- Least Concern (IUCN 3.1)

Scientific classification
- Kingdom: Animalia
- Phylum: Chordata
- Class: Reptilia
- Order: Squamata
- Suborder: Serpentes
- Family: Colubridae
- Genus: Oxybelis
- Species: O. aeneus

Binomial name
- Oxybelis aeneus (Wagler, 1824)

Synonyms
- Dryinus aeneus Wagler, 1824; Coluber acuminatus Wied, 1824; Dryinus auratus Bell, 1825; Dryiophis aeneus Garman, 1887; Oxybelis argenteus Boulenger, 1896; Oxybelis argenteus Bocourt, 1897; Oxybelis aeneus auratus A.H. Wright & A.A. Wright, 1957; Oxybelis aeneus H.M. Smith & Brodie, 1982

= Oxybelis aeneus =

Species of snake

Oxybelis aeneus, commonly known as the Mexican vine snake or brown vine snake, is a species of colubrid snake, which is endemic to the Americas.

== Geographic range and habitat ==
Oxybelis aeneus is found through southern Mexico, to northern South America and Trinidad and Tobago.

== Description ==
Oxybelis aeneus is an extremely slender snake that reaches up to 1.9 metres (6.2 ft) in total length (including a long tail). Its color may vary from gray to brown with a yellow underside.

An adult O. aeneus perches in the tree on the left, just above the lowest fork in the trunk. Mexican vine snakes disappear in their natural habitat; their cryptic morphology provides them with highly effective camouflage.

The body is laterally compressed. The snout is prominent, its length more than two times the diameter of the eye. There is 1 preocular, and there are 2 postoculars. There is 1 anterior temporal, and there are 2 posterior temporals. There is no loreal scale, and there are 8–10 upper labials.

The smooth dorsal scales are arranged in 17 rows at midbody.

Ventrals 173–205; subcaudals 150–188, divided (paired). The anal plate is divided in Arizona specimens, but is entire in South American specimens.

== Common names ==
In Arizona O. aeneus is also called "pike-headed tree snake". In Trinidad and Tobago and Guyana, it is known as a "horse whip" or "vine snake".

== Behavior ==
Mostly arboreal and diurnal, O. aeneus is quite often mistaken for a vine. When threatened, it sometimes releases foul smelling secretions from its vent.

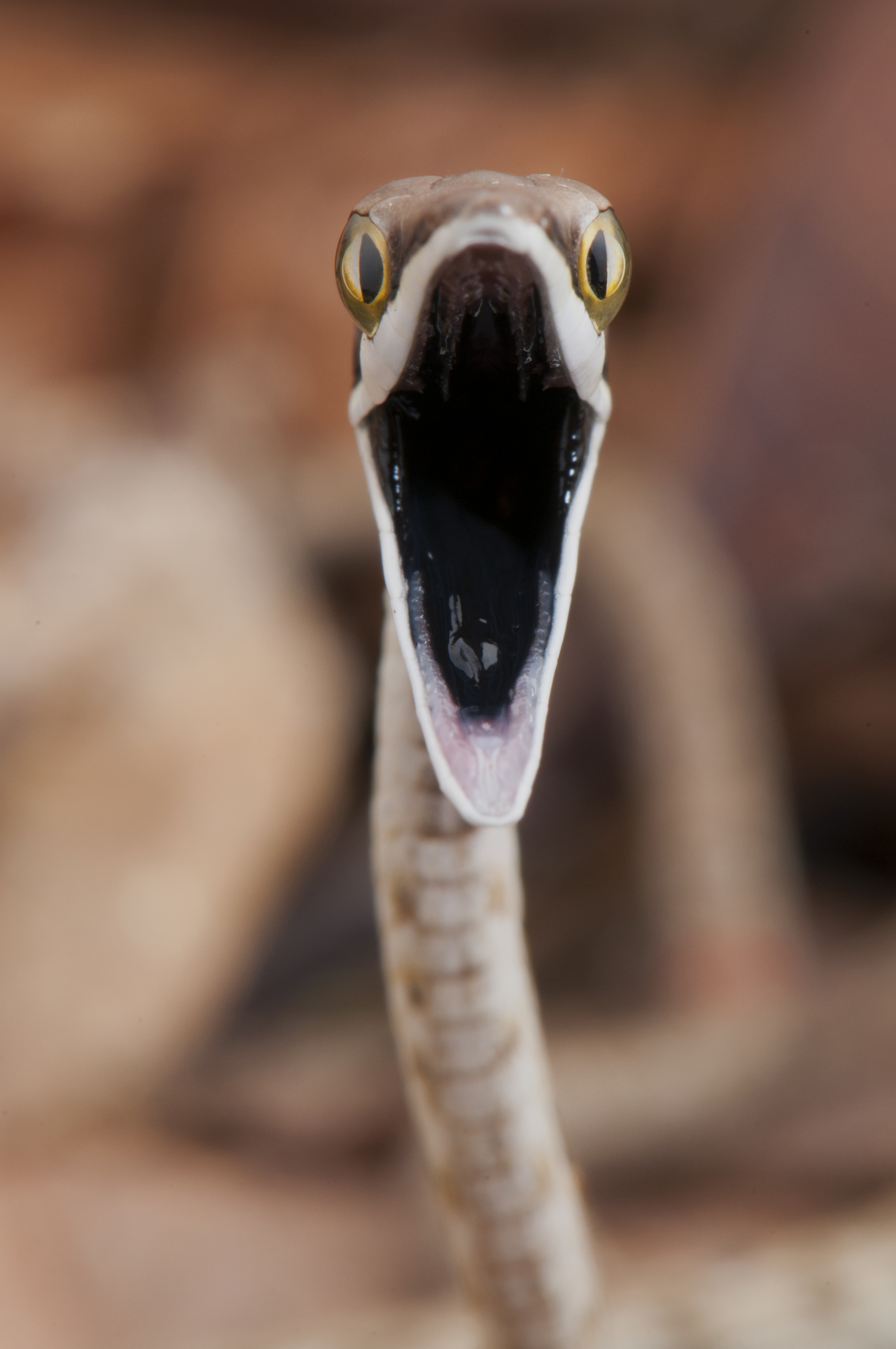
A Mexican vine snake opening its mouth and displaying its black oral mucosa to intimidate a predator

== Diet ==
Oxybelis aeneus feeds mainly on lizards (mostly anoles), but also eats frogs, small rodents and birds.

== Venom ==
Oxybelis aeneus is a mildly venomous rear-fanged snake, but it is not considered dangerous to humans.

== Reproduction ==
Oxybelis aeneus is oviparous. Clutch sizes of 3–6 have been published. In Arizona, hatching occurs in September.
