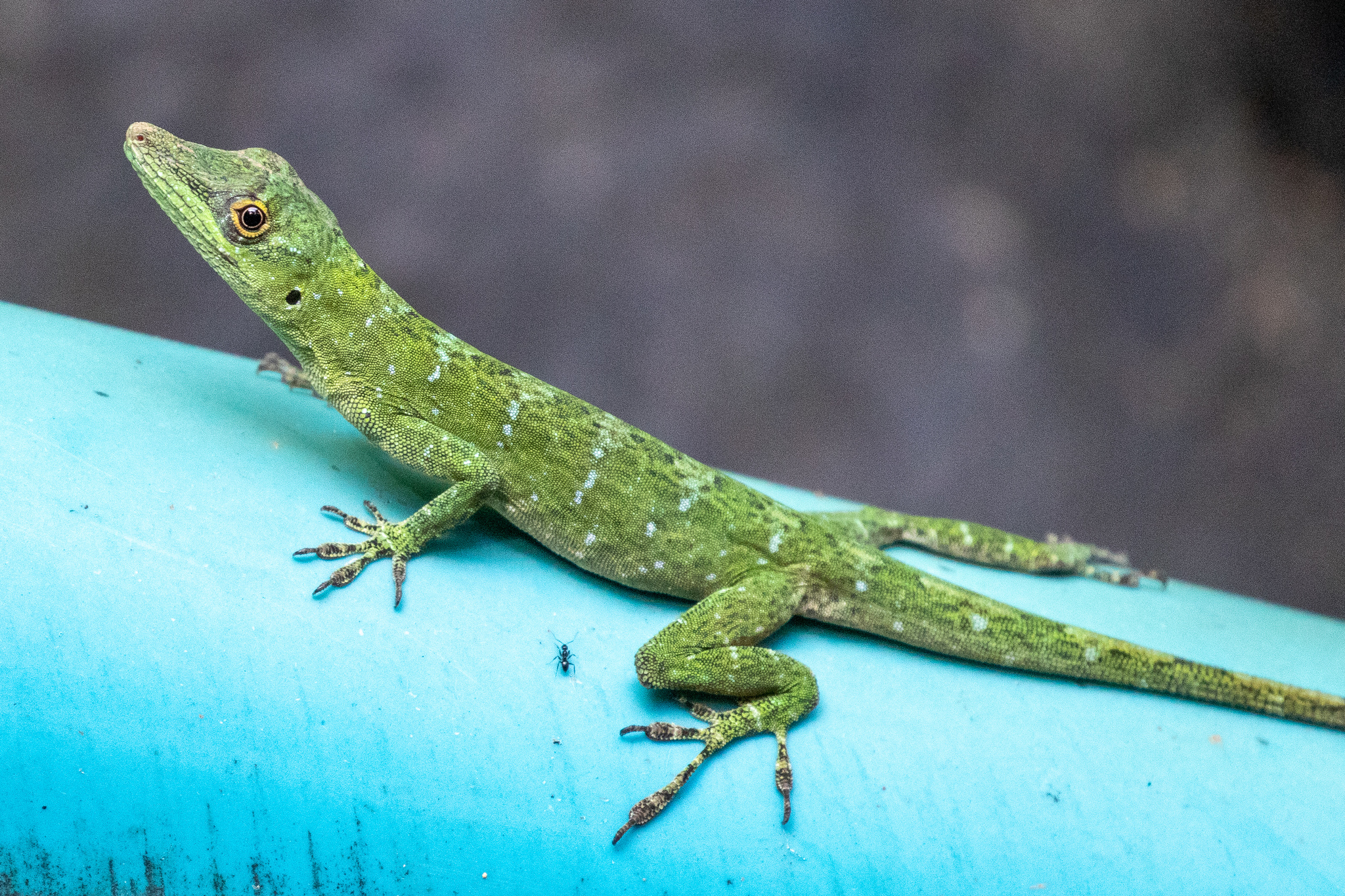

Conservation status
- Least Concern (IUCN 3.1)

Scientific classification
- Kingdom: Animalia
- Phylum: Chordata
- Class: Reptilia
- Order: Squamata
- Suborder: Iguania
- Family: Dactyloidae
- Genus: Anolis
- Species: A. punctatus

Binomial name
- Anolis punctatus Daudin, 1802

= Anolis punctatus =

Species of lizard

Anolis punctatus, the spotted anole or Amazon green anole, is a species of lizard in the family Dactyloidae. The species is found in Brazil, Venezuela, Guyana, Peru, Ecuador, Colombia, and Bolivia.

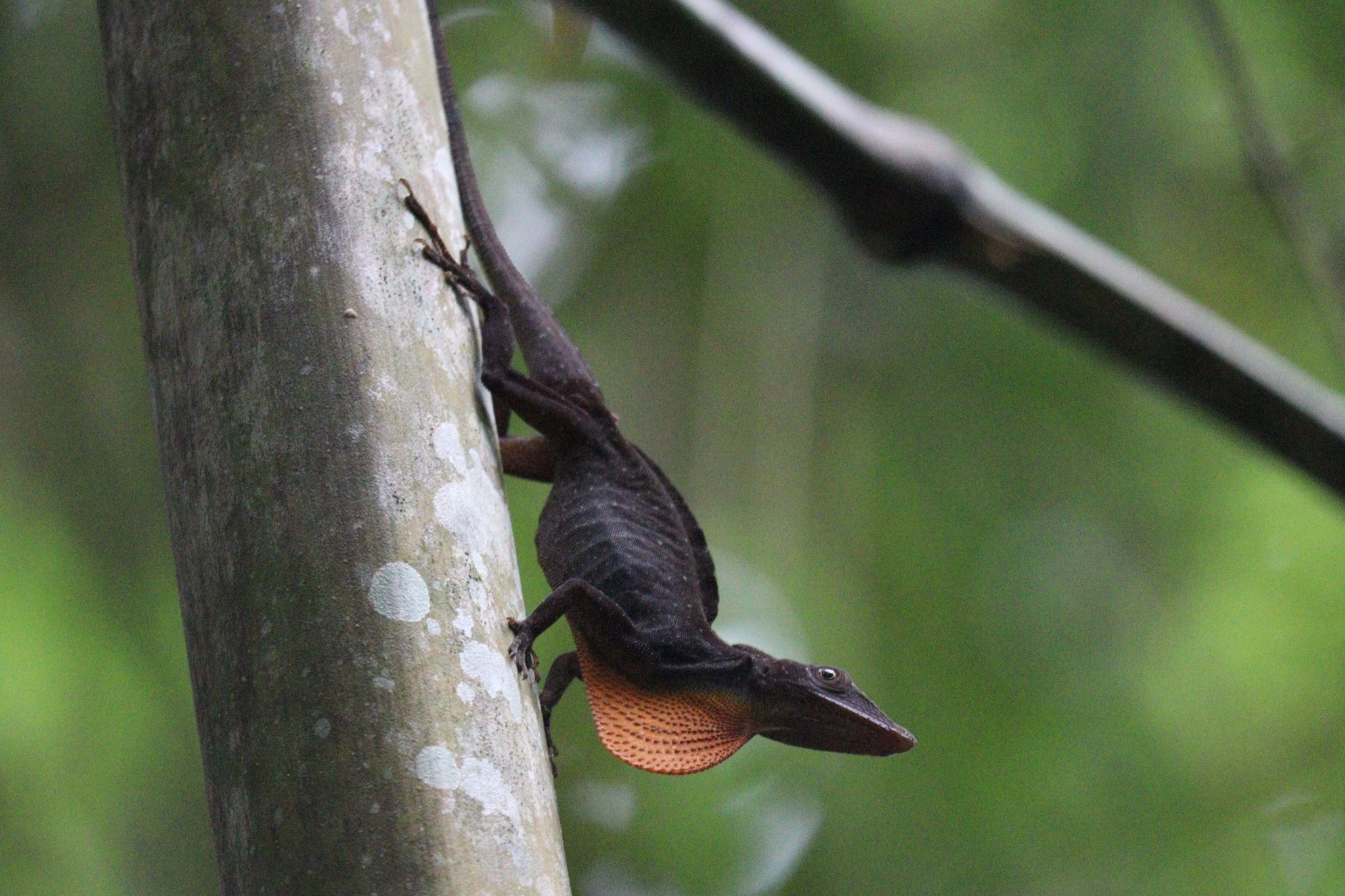
Peru
