= François Marie Daudin =

French zoologist

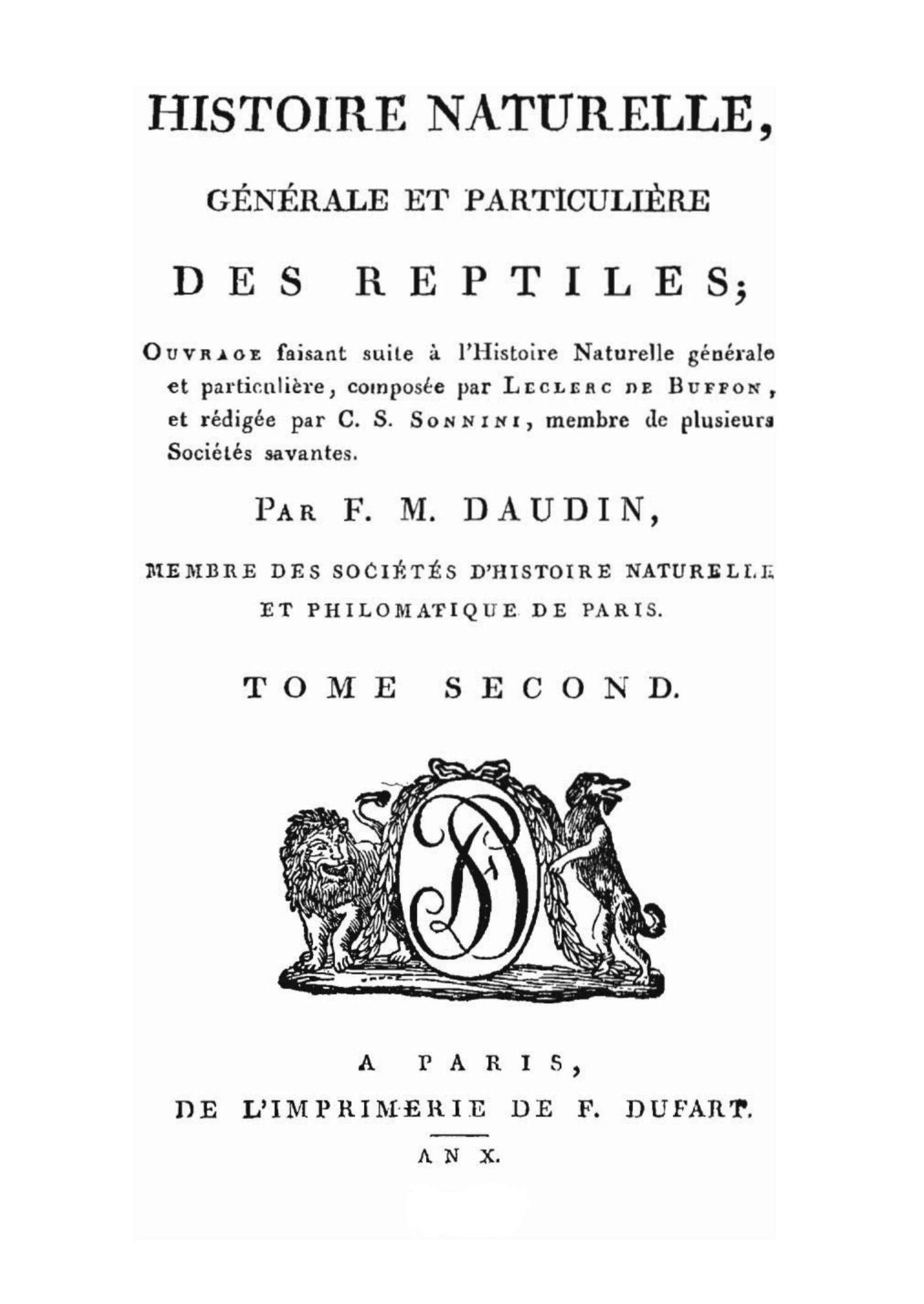
- Born: 29 August 1776; Paris
- Died: 30 November 1803 (aged 27); Paris
- Scientific career
- Fields: Herpetology

Signature
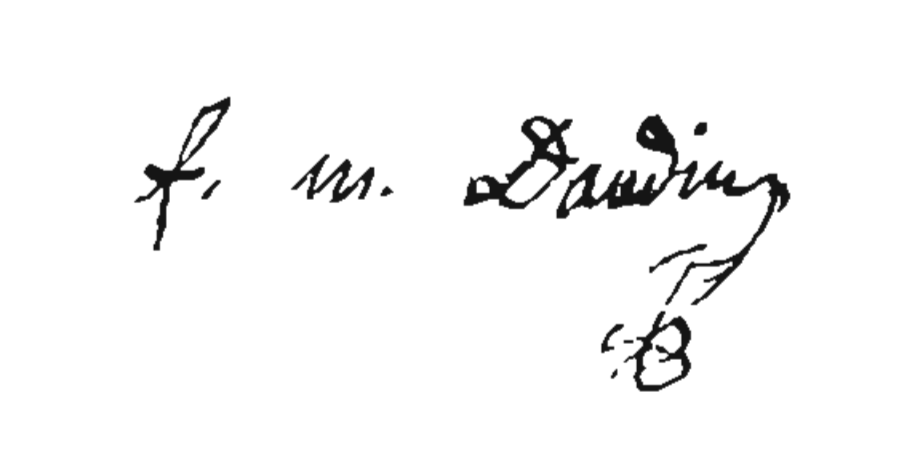

François Marie Daudin (French pronunciation: [fʁɑ̃swa maʁi dodɛ̃]; 29 August 1776 in Paris – 30 November 1803 in Paris) was a French zoologist.

== Biography ==
With legs paralyzed by childhood disease, he studied physics and natural history but ended up being devoted to the latter.

Daudin wrote Traité élémentaire et complet d'Ornithologie (Complete and Elementary Treatise of Ornithology) in 1799–1800. It was one of the first modern handbooks of ornithology, combining Linnean binomial nomenclature with the anatomical and physiological descriptions of Buffon. While an excellent beginning, it was never completed.

In 1800, he also published Recueil de mémoires et de notes sur des espèces inédites ou peu connues de mollusques, de vers et de zoophytes (Collection of memories and notes on new or little-known species of molluscs, worms and zoophytes).

Daudin found his greatest success in herpetology. He published Histoire naturelle des reinettes, des grenouilles et des crapauds (Natural history of tree frogs, frogs and toads) in 1802, and Histoire naturelle, générale et particulière des reptiles (Natural History of Reptiles) (8 volumes) in 1802–1803. This latter work contained descriptions of 517 species, many for the first time, based on examining over 1100 specimens.

He was assisted by his wife "Adèle" (Adélaïde Geneviève de Grégoire de Saint-Sauveur, born 1774), who drew the illustrations. Although his books were commercial failures the couple did not live in poverty, due to the family fortune. She died of tuberculosis in late 1803, and he followed shortly thereafter, also of tuberculosis, not yet 30 years old.

== Taxonomic credits ==
Despite his short life, Daudin made a lasting contribution to taxonomy.

=== Birds ===
- Accipiter minullus, little sparrowhawk
- Accipiter tachiro, African goshawk
- Anhinga rufa, African darter
- Anthochaera paradoxa, yellow wattlebird
- Ciccaba huhula, black-banded owl
- Circus ranivorus, African marsh harrier
- Coracias naevius, Purple roller
- Corvus leucognaphalus, white-necked crow
- Crypsirina temia, black racket-tailed treepie
- Falco chicquera, red-necked falcon
- Falco rufigularis, bat falcon
- Falco tinnunculus rupicolus, rock kestrel
- Gymnasio nudipes, Puerto Rican owl
- Haliaeetus vocifer, African fish eagle
- Lamprotornis ornatus, Principe glossy-starling
- Lophaetus occipitalis, long-crested eagle
- Lophostrix cristata, crested owl
- Loxigilla portoricensis, Puerto Rican bullfinch
- Malimbus malimbicus, crested malimbe
- Melanerpes portoricensis, Puerto Rican woodpecker
- Melierax gabar, Gabar goshawk
- Morphnus guianensis, crested eagle
- Onychognathus nabouroup, pale-winged starling
- Paradisaea rubra, red bird-of-paradise
- Phaethon lepturus, white-tailed tropicbird
- Ploceus baglafecht, baglafecht weaver
- Polemaetus bellicosus, martial eagle
- Saltator fuliginosus, black-throated grosbeak
- Seleucidis melanoleucus, twelve-wired bird-of-paradise
- Spizaetus ornatus, ornate hawk eagle
- Sporopipes frontalis, speckle-fronted weaver
- Sturnus melanopterus, black-winged starling
- Terathopius ecaudatus, bateleur

=== Reptiles ===
- Genus Acanthophis, death adders
- Genus Bungarus, kraits
- Genus Corallus, tree boas
- Genus Eryx, Old World sand boas
- Genus Lachesis, bushmasters
- Genus Pelamis, yellow-bellied sea snakes
- Genus Python, pythons
- Genus Ophisaurus, glass lizards
- Genus Takydromus, Oriental racers
- Alligator mississippiensis, American alligator
- Anolis auratus, anole, no common name
- Anolis punctatus, Amazon green anole
- Atretium schistosum, split keelback (snake)
- Bitis cornuta, many-horned adder
- Boa constrictor imperator, common northern boa
- Caiman latirostris, broad-snouted caiman
- Caiman yacare, yacare caiman
- Clelia clelia, black mussurana
- Coronella girondica, southern smooth snake
- Cuora amboinensis amboinensis, Malayan box turtle
- Dendrelaphis tristis, bronzeback (snake)
- Disteira nigrocincta, no common name, venomous sea snake
- Dracaena guianensis, caiman lizard
- Elaphe helena, trinket snake
- Enhydrina schistosa, beaked sea snake
- Eumeces schneiderii, Schneider's skink
- Gopherus polyphemus, Florida gopher tortoise
- Hemidactylus triedrus, termite hill gecko
- Hydrophis cyanocinctus, annulated sea snake
- Hydrophis mamillaris, Bombay sea snake
- Hydrophis obscurus, Russell's sea snake
- Kentropyx striata, striped Kentropyx (lizard)
- Lacerta bilineata, western green lizard
- Lycodon capucinus, common wolf snake
- Lycodon nympha, common bridal snake
- Micrurus psyches, carib coral snake
- Oxybelis fulgidus, green vine snake
- Pituophis melanoleucus, pine snake
- Rafetus euphraticus, Euphrates softshell turtle
- Ramphotyphlops braminus, brahminy blind snake
- Rhinoclemmys punctularia, spot-legged turtle
- Sceloporus undulatus undulatus, eastern fence lizard
- Scelotes gronovii, Gronovi's dwarf burrowing skink
- Siphlophis compressus, red vine snake
- Takydromus sexlineatus, Asian grass lizard
- Teius teyou, no common name, family Teiidae (whiptails)
- Timon lepidus, ocellated lizard
- Tripanurgos compressus, mapepire de fe (snake)
- Varanus albigularis, rock monitor
- Varanus bengalensis, Bengal monitor
- Varanus griseus, desert monitor
- Varanus indicus, mangrove monitor
- Xenoxybelis argenteus, green striped vine snake

=== Amphibians ===
- Caecilia albiventris, no common name, Caecilian
- Cryptobranchus alleganiensis, hellbender (salamander)
- Elachistocleis surinamensis, sapito apuntado de Surinam
- Hoplobatrachus tigerinus, Indian bullfrog
- Hyla surinamensis (nomen dubium)
- Pelodytes punctatus, common parsley frog
- Phyllomedusa hypochondrialis, rana lemur de flancos rojos
- Pseudacris ocularis, little grass frog
- Sphaenorhynchus lacteus, rana fantasma (tree frog)
- Xenopus laevis, African clawed frog

=== Molluscs ===
- Genus Spiroglyptus, wormsnails, family Vermetidae
- Genus Vermetus, wormsnails, family Vermetidae

=== Annelids ===
- Genus Spirorbis, hard tube worms

=== Taxa named in Daudin's honour ===
- Aldabrachelys gigantea daudinii (A.M.C. Duméril & Bibron, 1835) – Daudin's giant tortoise (extinct, Seychelles)
