= List of lakes of Flathead County, Montana (M–Z) =

There are at least 269 named lakes and reservoirs in Flathead County, Montana.

== Lakes ==
- Margaret Lake, 48°05′17″N 113°48′31″W, el. 5,686 feet (1,733 m)
- Marion Lake, 48°15′58″N 113°40′29″W, el. 5,915 feet (1,803 m)
- Martha Lake, 48°08′36″N 113°55′53″W, el. 5,587 feet (1,703 m)
- Martin Lakes, 48°33′09″N 114°37′52″W, el. 3,307 feet (1,008 m)
- Mary Baker Lake, 48°38′59″N 113°45′23″W, el. 6,604 feet (2,013 m)
- McGilvray Lake, 48°08′35″N 114°04′48″W, el. 2,979 feet (908 m)
- McGregor Lake, 48°02′18″N 114°50′33″W, el. 3,894 feet (1,187 m)
- Meadow Lake, 48°33′52″N 114°32′34″W, el. 3,484 feet (1,062 m)
- Middle Foy Lake, 48°10′23″N 114°22′10″W, el. 3,255 feet (992 m)
- Middle Quartz Lake, 48°49′23″N 114°08′29″W, el. 4,400 feet (1,300 m)
- Miller Lake, 48°52′36″N 114°25′06″W, el. 4,068 feet (1,240 m)
- Molly Lake, 48°37′28″N 114°38′40″W, el. 3,684 feet (1,123 m)
- Moose Country Pond, 48°38′44″N 113°50′45″W, el. 3,323 feet (1,013 m)
- Moose Lake, 48°11′03″N 113°25′23″W, el. 4,905 feet (1,495 m)
- Moose Lake, 48°37′50″N 114°23′34″W, el. 5,659 feet (1,725 m)
- Morning Slough, 48°18′39″N 114°08′48″W, el. 3,038 feet (926 m)
- Mud Lake, 47°38′20″N 113°20′03″W, el. 4,340 feet (1,320 m)
- Mud Lake, 48°06′42″N 113°59′42″W, el. 3,035 feet (925 m)
- Mud Lake, 48°27′40″N 114°02′25″W, el. 3,222 feet (982 m)
- Mud Lake, 48°37′39″N 114°12′46″W, el. 3,786 feet (1,154 m)
- Murray Lake, 48°26′31″N 114°27′09″W, el. 3,379 feet (1,030 m)
- Mystery Lake, 48°37′57″N 114°36′05″W, el. 5,262 feet (1,604 m)
- Nasukoin Lake, 48°47′33″N 114°33′18″W, el. 6,686 feet (2,038 m)
- North Biglow Lake, 48°03′01″N 113°48′57″W, el. 6,138 feet (1,871 m)
- Northwestern Lake, 48°19′52″N 114°27′11″W, el. 3,120 feet (950 m)
- Numa Lake, 48°55′10″N 114°08′29″W, el. 6,526 feet (1,989 m)
- Nyack Lakes, 48°29′22″N 113°29′46″W, el. 4,918 feet (1,499 m)
- Ole Lake, 48°22′56″N 113°22′58″W, el. 5,574 feet (1,699 m)
- Ole Lake, 48°20′48″N 113°26′01″W, el. 4,744 feet (1,446 m)
- Olive Lake, 48°09′18″N 114°04′18″W, el. 2,979 feet (908 m)
- Olor Lake, 47°45′08″N 113°37′36″W, el. 5,676 feet (1,730 m)
- Palisade Lake, 47°41′17″N 113°34′38″W, el. 6,188 feet (1,886 m)
- Peterson Lake, 48°07′20″N 114°03′39″W, el. 3,012 feet (918 m)
- Picnic Lakes, 48°09′25″N 113°55′46″W, el. 6,644 feet (2,025 m)
- Picture Lake, 47°44′59″N 113°27′44″W, el. 6,821 feet (2,079 m)
- Pilgrim Lakes, 48°06′24″N 113°52′04″W, el. 6,368 feet (1,941 m)
- Plummers Lake, 48°11′08″N 114°06′04″W, el. 2,979 feet (908 m)
- Pocket Lake, 48°57′08″N 114°06′25″W, el. 6,617 feet (2,017 m)
- Pot Lake, 47°56′39″N 113°10′18″W, el. 6,965 feet (2,123 m)
- Pratt Lake (Montana), 48°10′26″N 114°05′27″W, el. 2,972 feet (906 m)
- Quartz Lake, 48°49′31″N 114°06′18″W, el. 4,419 feet (1,347 m)
- Rainbow Lake, 48°26′33″N 114°26′28″W, el. 3,422 feet (1,043 m)
- Recluse Lake, 47°40′22″N 113°28′47″W, el. 6,716 feet (2,047 m)
- Red Meadow Lake, 48°45′21″N 114°33′42″W, el. 5,548 feet (1,691 m)
- Reeds Slough, 48°07′35″N 114°11′56″W, el. 2,894 feet (882 m)
- Rock Lake, 47°54′18″N 113°41′08″W, el. 6,752 feet (2,058 m)
- Rogers Lake, 48°39′39″N 113°56′17″W, el. 3,796 feet (1,157 m)
- Ruger Lake, 48°44′15″N 113°55′00″W, el. 5,807 feet (1,770 m)
- Sampson Lake (Montana), 48°24′05″N 114°22′23″W, el. 3,179 feet (969 m)
- Sawdust Lake, 48°10′51″N 114°05′33″W, el. 2,976 feet (907 m)
- Scott Lake, 48°04′29″N 113°20′12″W, el. 4,859 feet (1,481 m)
- Seven Winds of the Lake, 48°31′24″N 113°27′54″W, el. 6,975 feet (2,126 m)
- Shadow Lake, 47°55′13″N 113°10′42″W, el. 7,178 feet (2,188 m)
- Shelf Lake (Montana), 47°56′09″N 113°19′15″W, el. 4,508 feet (1,374 m)
- Skookum Lake, 48°01′23″N 114°44′36″W, el. 3,996 feet (1,218 m)
- Skyles Lake, 48°24′23″N 114°24′08″W, el. 3,159 feet (963 m)
- Smith Lake, 48°29′47″N 114°25′18″W, el. 3,337 feet (1,017 m)
- Smith Lake, 48°07′01″N 114°26′40″W, el. 3,146 feet (959 m)
- Smokey Lake, 48°37′29″N 114°43′38″W, el. 3,665 feet (1,117 m)
- Snyder Lake, 48°37′38″N 113°48′09″W, el. 5,246 feet (1,599 m)
- Soldier Lake, 47°58′35″N 113°38′11″W, el. 4,665 feet (1,422 m)
- Spencer Lake (Montana), 48°23′51″N 114°25′07″W, el. 3,091 feet (942 m)
- Spill Lake, 48°08′16″N 114°03′14″W, el. 3,012 feet (918 m)
- Spoon Lake, 48°28′31″N 114°08′44″W, el. 3,442 feet (1,049 m)
- Spotted Bear Lake, 47°55′26″N 113°29′32″W, el. 4,075 feet (1,242 m)
- Spring Lake, 47°42′00″N 113°12′29″W, el. 5,715 feet (1,742 m)
- Spring Lakes, 48°39′03″N 114°41′34″W, el. 3,783 feet (1,153 m)
- Spruce Lake (Montana), 48°09′36″N 113°36′01″W, el. 5,945 feet (1,812 m)
- Stanton Lake, 48°23′01″N 113°43′50″W, el. 3,743 feet (1,141 m)
- Strawberry Lake, 48°12′32″N 113°58′43″W, el. 5,584 feet (1,702 m)
- Striped Elk Lake, 48°24′06″N 113°31′28″W, el. 6,299 feet (1,920 m)
- Sunburst Lake, 47°44′09″N 113°36′37″W, el. 5,325 feet (1,623 m)
- Sunday Lakes, 48°38′30″N 114°44′55″W, el. 3,396 feet (1,035 m)
- Swimming Lake, 48°11′42″N 114°05′55″W, el. 2,979 feet (908 m)
- Sylvia Lake (Montana), 48°20′34″N 114°49′12″W, el. 4,921 feet (1,500 m)
- Tally Lake, 48°24′03″N 114°33′15″W, el. 3,356 feet (1,023 m)
- Talmadge Lake, 48°08′03″N 114°04′01″W, el. 2,995 feet (913 m)
- Tamarack Lake (Montana), 48°11′05″N 114°05′29″W, el. 2,972 feet (906 m)
- Tepee Lake, 48°54′17″N 114°25′17″W, el. 4,071 feet (1,241 m)
- Thornberg Lake, 48°27′54″N 114°24′44″W, el. 3,314 feet (1,010 m)
- Three Bears Lake, 48°19′29″N 113°21′50″W, el. 5,285 feet (1,611 m)
- Three Eagles Lakes, 48°07′15″N 113°51′44″W, el. 5,709 feet (1,740 m)
- Tom Tom Lake, 48°04′06″N 113°51′54″W, el. 5,830 feet (1,780 m)
- Trilobite Lakes, 47°58′50″N 113°08′25″W, el. 6,840 feet (2,080 m)
- Trout Lake, 48°40′49″N 113°54′36″W, el. 3,907 feet (1,191 m)
- Twin Lakes, 48°10′45″N 113°56′04″W, el. 6,309 feet (1,923 m)
- Twin Lakes, 48°24′06″N 114°29′32″W, el. 3,143 feet (958 m)
- Upper Isabel Lake, 48°25′16″N 113°30′26″W, el. 5,994 feet (1,827 m)
- Upper Kintla Lake, 48°58′26″N 114°10′34″W, el. 4,377 feet (1,334 m)
- Upper Snyder Lake, 48°37′50″N 113°47′41″W, el. 5,577 feet (1,700 m)
- Upper Stillwater Lake, 48°35′13″N 114°38′06″W, el. 3,192 feet (973 m)
- Upper Whitefish Lake, 48°41′12″N 114°34′45″W, el. 4,426 feet (1,349 m)
- Wall Lake, 48°36′26″N 114°40′51″W, el. 3,353 feet (1,022 m)
- Whale Lake, 48°48′24″N 114°42′31″W, el. 6,112 feet (1,863 m)
- Whitefish Lake, 48°27′13″N 114°22′46″W, el. 2,999 feet (914 m)
- Wildcat Lake, 48°11′48″N 113°57′05″W, el. 5,823 feet (1,775 m)
- Wileys Slough, 48°07′25″N 114°12′39″W, el. 2,897 feet (883 m)
- Winona Lake, 48°43′46″N 114°14′10″W, el. 3,497 feet (1,066 m)
- Woods Lake (Montana), 48°27′15″N 114°25′23″W, el. 3,392 feet (1,034 m)
- Woods Lake (Flathead County, Montana), 48°38′06″N 114°40′16″W, el. 3,556 feet (1,084 m)

== Reservoirs ==
- Pearson Reservoir, 48°05′23″N 114°52′42″W, el. 3,786 feet (1,154 m)

== See also ==
- List of lakes in Montana
- List of lakes in Flathead County, Montana (A-L)
