= Lake Winona =

Lake Winona or Winona Lake may refer to:

- Lake Winona (Arkansas), a lake of Saline County, Arkansas
  - Lake Winona Research Natural Area, a National Natural Landmark in Arkansas
- Lake Winona, a lake in the Clermont chain of lakes, Florida
- Winona Lake, Indiana, a town and the lake that it is situated on
- Winona Lake (Flathead County, Montana), a lake
- Lake Winona (Minnesota), in Winona, Minnesota
- Lake Winona, a New Hampton, New Hampshire
- Lake Winona (Vermont), a Vermont lake

== See also ==
- Winona (disambiguation)
