= Winona =

Winona may refer to:

== Places ==
=== Canada ===
- Winona, Ontario

=== United States ===
- Winona, Arizona
- Winona, Indiana
- Winona Lake, Indiana
- Winona, Kansas
- Winona, Michigan
- Winona County, Minnesota
  - Winona, Minnesota, the seat of Winona County
- Winona, Mississippi
- Winona, Missouri
- Winona, Ohio
- Winona, Tennessee (disambiguation), several places
- Winona, Texas
- Winona, West Virginia
- Winona, Taylor County, West Virginia
- Winona Historic District, in Norfolk, Virginia
- East Winona, Wisconsin

== Other uses ==
- Winona (legend)
- Winona (name)
- Winona (horse), a racehorse
- Winona (Winona, Virginia), U.S., a historic home
- Roman Catholic Diocese of Winona-Rochester, Minnesota, United States

== See also ==
- Lake Winona (disambiguation)
- Wynona (disambiguation)
- Wynonna (Wynonna Judd, born 1964), American singer
- Wenona (disambiguation)
- Wenonah (disambiguation)
