= C. reinhardtii =

C. reinhardtii may refer to:

- Chlamydomonas reinhardtii, a freshwater alga used primarily as a model organism in biology
- Calabaria reinhardtii, the Calabar python, a nonvenomous snake species endemic to west and central Africa
