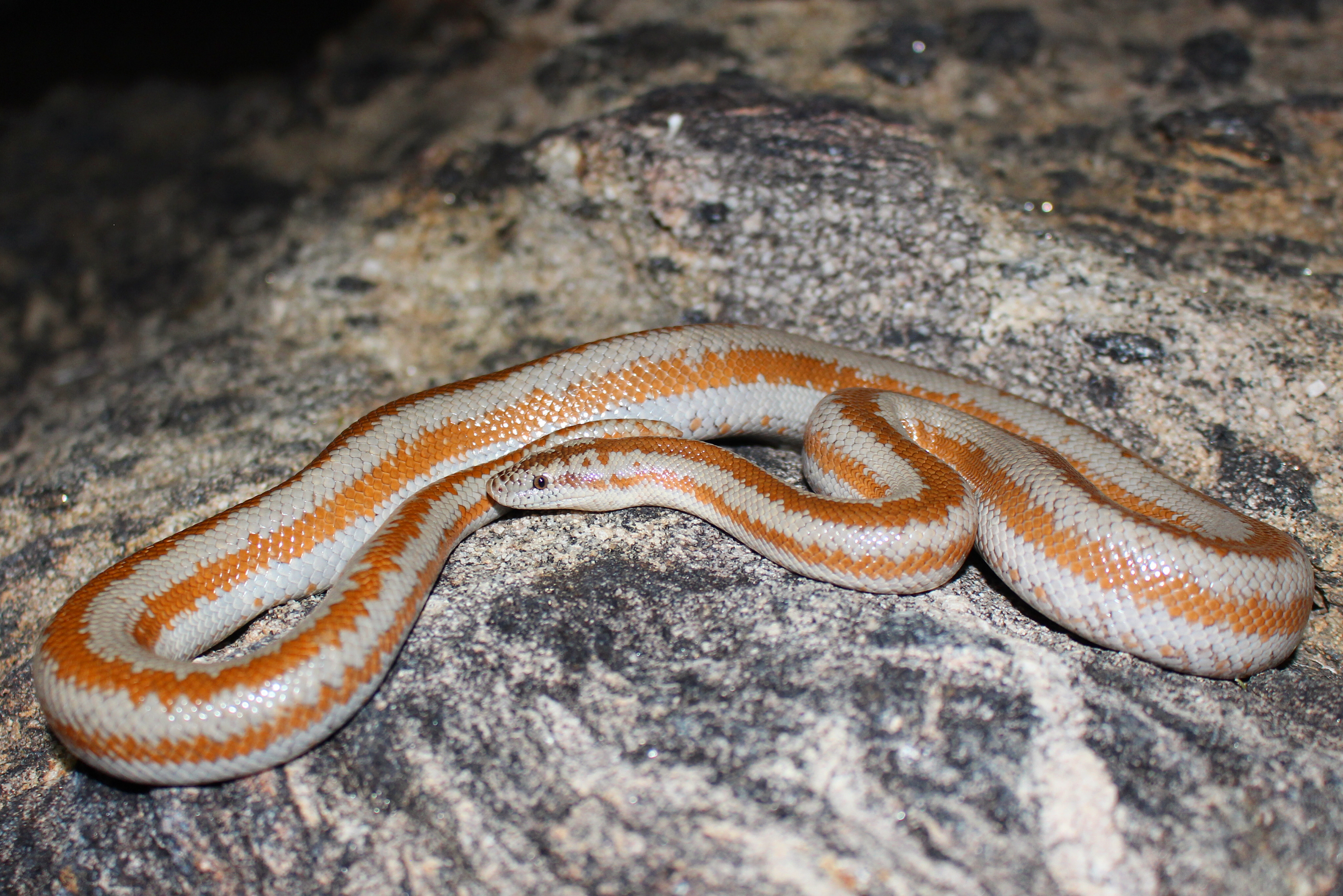

Conservation status
- Least Concern (IUCN 3.1)

Scientific classification
- Kingdom: Animalia
- Phylum: Chordata
- Class: Reptilia
- Order: Squamata
- Suborder: Serpentes
- Family: Boidae
- Genus: Lichanura
- Species: L. orcutti

Binomial name
- Lichanura orcutti Stejneger, 1889
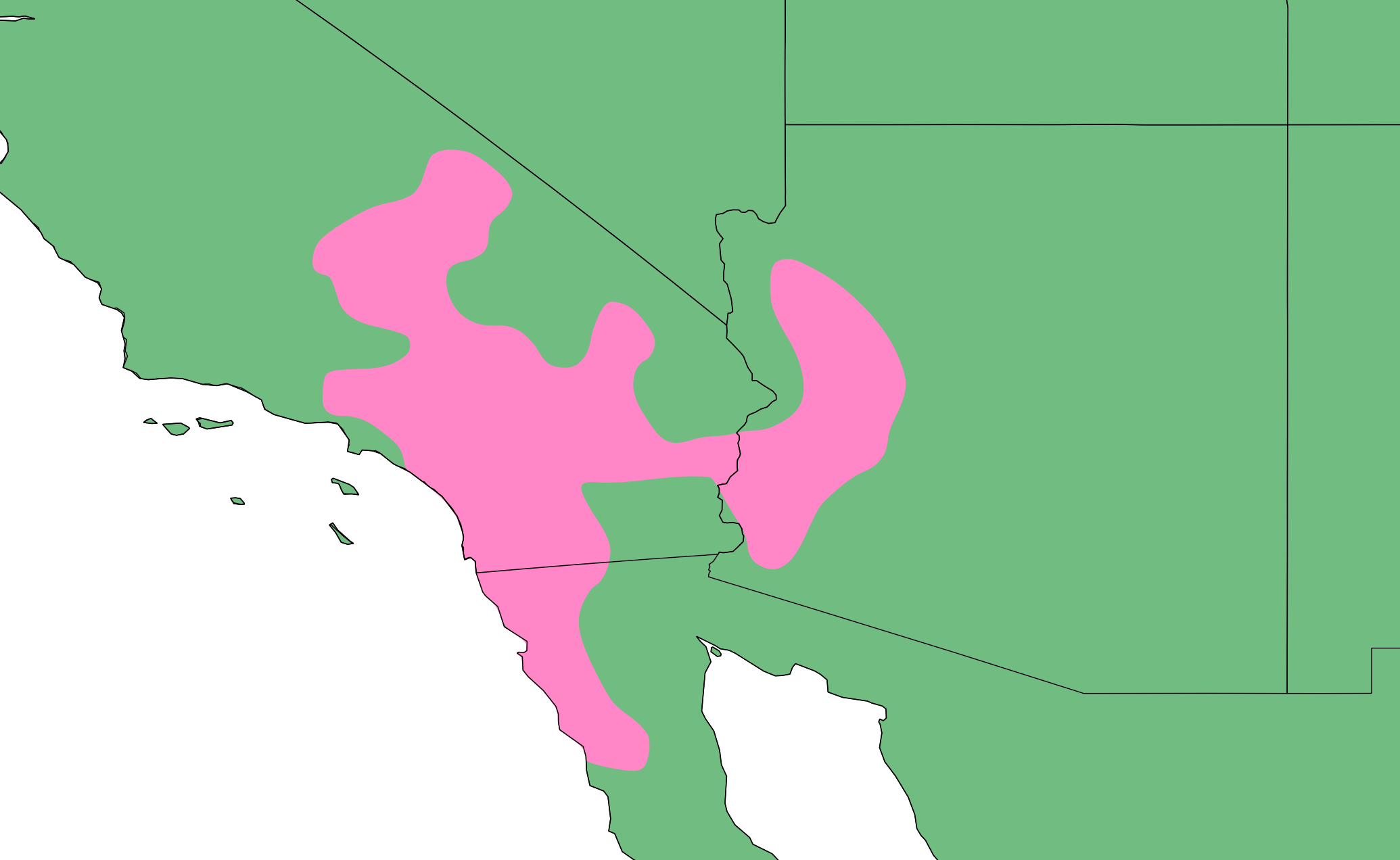

= Lichanura orcutti =

Species of snake

Lichanura orcutti, also known as the rosy boa, the coastal rosy boa, or the northern three-lined boa, is a species of snake in the family Boidae. This species is found North of the US–Mexico border within San Diego County in California and along the coastal Peninsular Ranges, northward into the Mojave Desert and eastward in the Sonoran Desert of California and Arizona. Lichanura orcutti is one of four boa species native to the continental United States, the other three being the desert rosy boa (Lichanura trivirgata), and the two species of rubber boas (Charina).

== Taxonomy ==
Zoologist Leonhard Stejneger described the species in 1889. Lichanura taxonomy is not well understood; some taxonomists have challenged the Lichanura genus and suggest that these species be grouped with Charina, the rubber boas. L. orcutti was previously considered to be a subspecies of L. trivirgata; DNA analysis later identified L. orcutti as a distinct species. Confusion over scientific names is compounded by the fact that Lichanura species are popular as pets and reptile keepers frequently use outdated taxonomy.

== Description ==
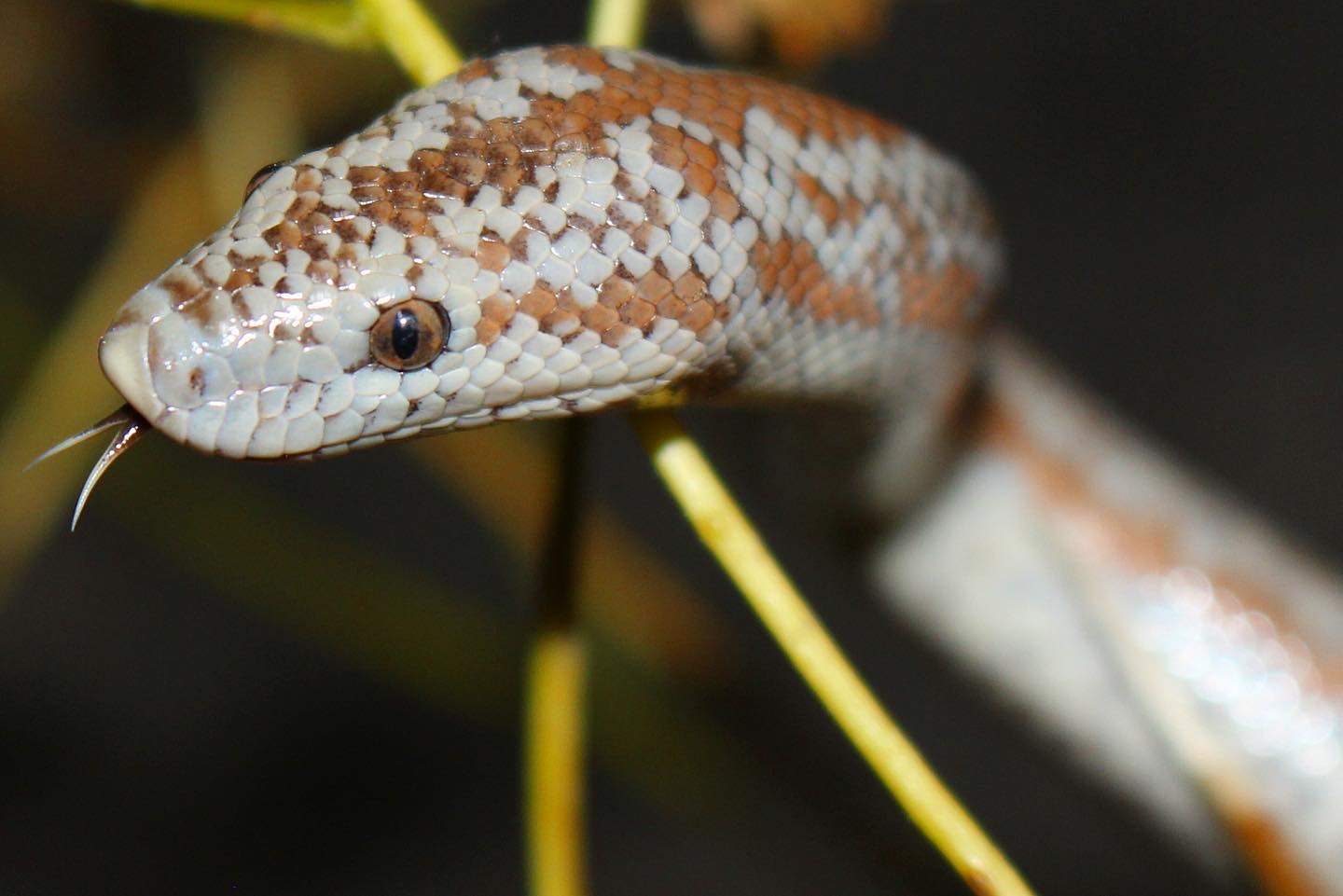
Close-up of head with ill-defined striping and characteristic vertical pupils

Lichanura orcutti is a heavy-bodied snake with smooth scales and a tapered blunt tail. The head is marginally wider than the neck. It has vertical pupils. Adults can range from 17 to 44 inches (43 to 112 cm) in length, though they rarely exceed 36 inches (91 cm). Hatchlings are 10 to 14 inches long. Males typically have well-developed anal spurs.

This species has three stripes that run lengthwise down the dorsal and lateral aspects of the animal. These stripes may be tan, orange, brick red, or reddish-brown depending on locality; interspaces vary from blue grey to tan, yellow, or nearly white. Stripes vary from defined to ill-defined depending on the individual animal. The coloration of younger animals is typically lighter with more defined striping. Despite the name "rosy boa," most individuals do not have the rosy ventral coloration from which the species derives its popular common name.

== Distribution and habitat ==
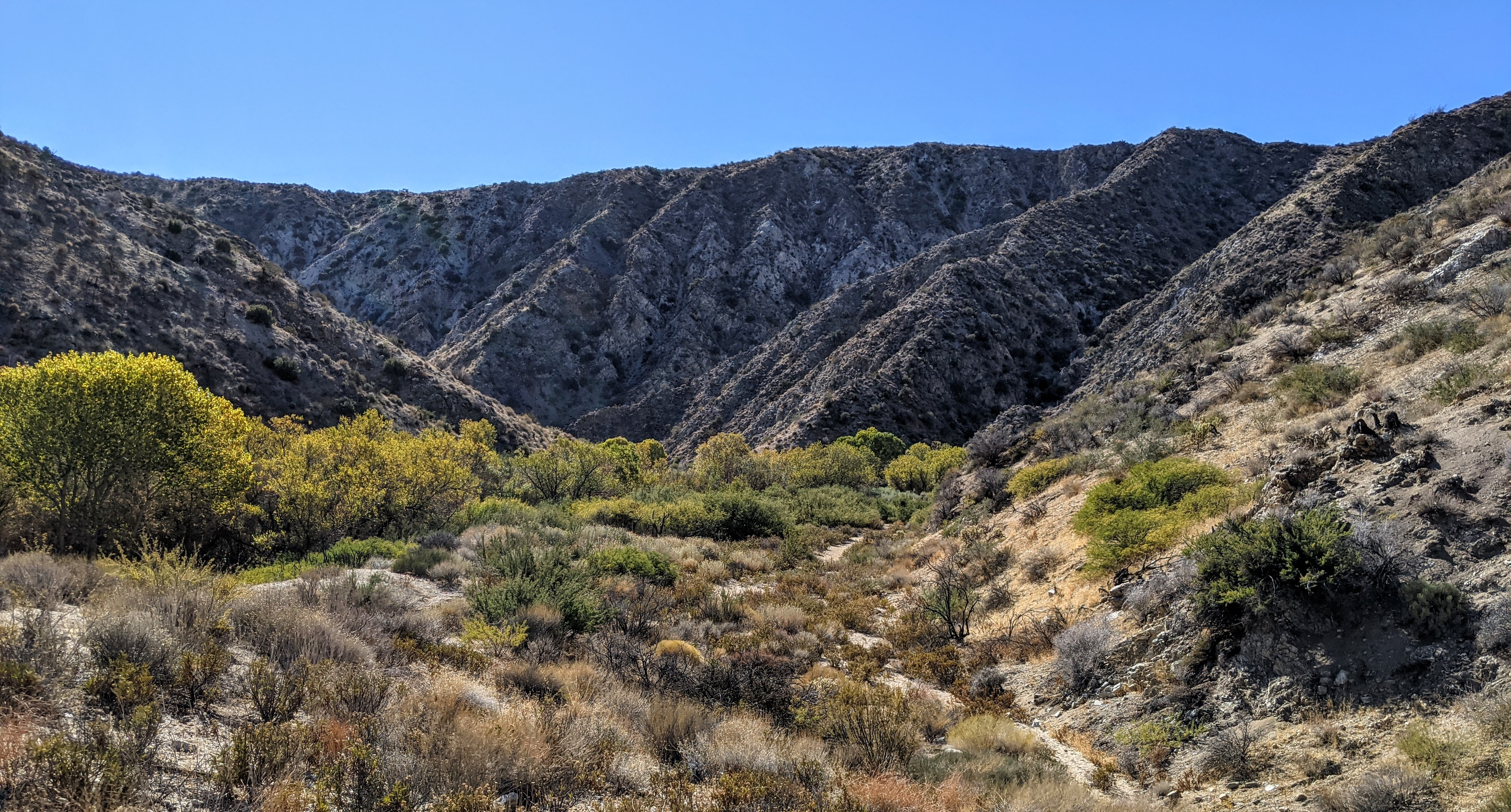
Lichanura orcutti habitat, Morongo Valley, California

This species is found North of the US–Mexico border within San Diego County in California and along the coastal Peninsular Ranges, northward into the Mojave Desert and eastward in the Sonoran Desert of California and Arizona. This species also occurs in southern Nevada.

Habitat consists of arid scrublands, semi-arid shrublands, rocky shrublands, rocky deserts, canyons, and other rocky areas. This species may be more common in riparian areas such as oases and permanent or intermittent streams, but it does not require permanent water. The IUCN Redlist suggests that L. orcutti's affinity for rocky habitats unsuitable for development or agriculture may protect it from habitat loss.

== Behavior and ecology ==
Lichanura orcutti is primarily nocturnal, with peak activity occurring during dusk, the night, and dawn. During cooler weather this species may also be seen basking in the early morning or late afternoon. During inclement weather and during the hottest and coldest months of the year, L. orcutti remains inactive in burrows or under cover.

This species is live-bearing, and young are born between October and November. Females generally give birth to 3–14 young.

== Diet ==
Lichanura orcutti is an opportunistic predator and will feed on any suitably sized vertebrates including rodents, birds, smaller reptiles, or amphibians. This species kills prey by constriction.

== In captivity ==
Rosy boas – including L. orcutti – are popular pet snakes due to their docile temperament, striking coloration, and hardiness in captivity. A well cared for animal can be expected to live around 30 years.
