= Wenona =

Wenona may refer to:

Locations

In the United States:

- Wenona, Georgia, a census-designated place
- Wenona, Illinois, a city
- Wenona, Maryland, an unincorporated community on Deal Island in Somerset County
- Wenona, Michigan, a historic settlement, now part of Bay City
- East Wenona, Illinois, a former village

Other uses

- Wenona School, an independent, day and boarding school for girls in North Sydney, New South Wales, Australia
- A taxonomic synonym for Charina, a genus of boas found in Africa and North America

== See also ==
- Wenonah (disambiguation)
- Winona (disambiguation)
