= Lake Winona Research Natural Area =

Arkansas Research Natural Area

Coordinates: 34.814°N 92.939°W

Winona Lake Research Natural Area is a 280-acre (110 ha) area of old-growth forest in Saline County, in the U.S. state of Arkansas. It is located in the Winona Ranger District of the Ouachita National Forest, on the south end of the Fourche Mountains, near Jessieville, Arkansas. The area was designated a National Natural Landmark in 1977. The land is owned by the U.S. Federal Government and is administered by the USDA Forest Service.

Winona Lake is a forested area that is dominated by a shortleaf pine overstory. The main source of water to Winona Lake is Alum Fork Creek.

== See also ==
- List of National Natural Landmarks in Arkansas
