= Wynona =

Wynona may refer to:

- Wynona, Oklahoma, a town in the United States
- Wynona (restaurant), a restaurant in Toronto

== See also ==
- Wynonna (Wynonna Judd, born 1964), American singer
- Winona (disambiguation)
