= Arrow Lake (Flathead County, Montana) =

Lake in Montana, United States

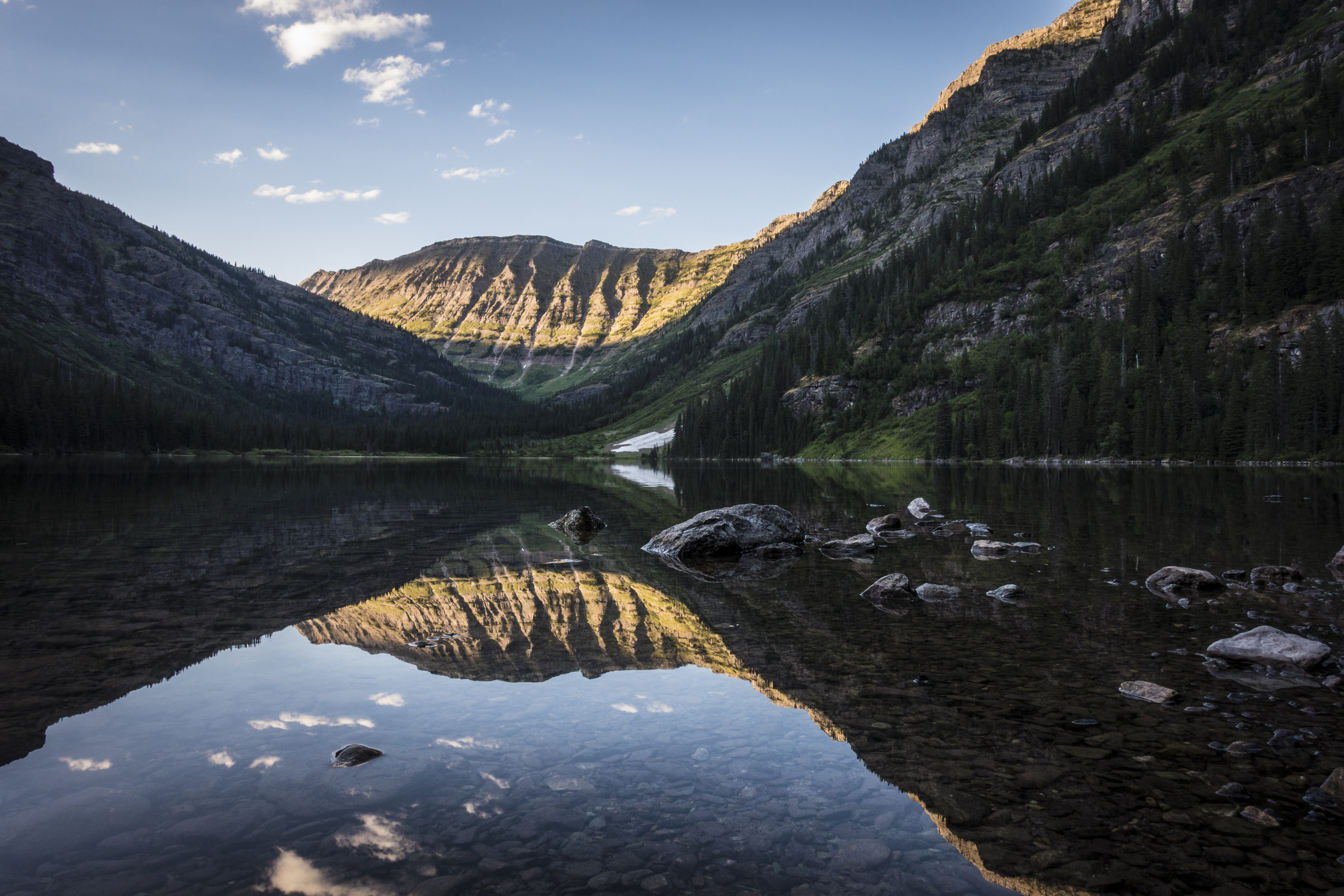

- Location within Montana Location within the United States
- Location: Glacier National Park, Flathead County, Montana, US
- Coordinates: 48°42′24″N 113°53′06″W
- Type: Natural
- Primary inflows: Camas Creek
- Primary outflows: Camas Creek
- Basin countries: United States
- Max. length: .50 mi (0.80 km)
- Max. width: .25 mi (0.40 km)
- Surface elevation: 4,070 ft (1,240 m)

Arrow Lake is located in Glacier National Park, in the U. S. state of Montana. Arrow Lake is situated in the Camas Valley, and is 1.25 miles (2.01 km) west of Heavens Peak and a little over 1 mile (1.6 km) NNE of Trout Lake. Arrow Lake is a 9.5 miles (15.3 km) hike from the trailhead along the North Fork Road.

== See also ==
- List of lakes in Flathead County, Montana (A-L)
