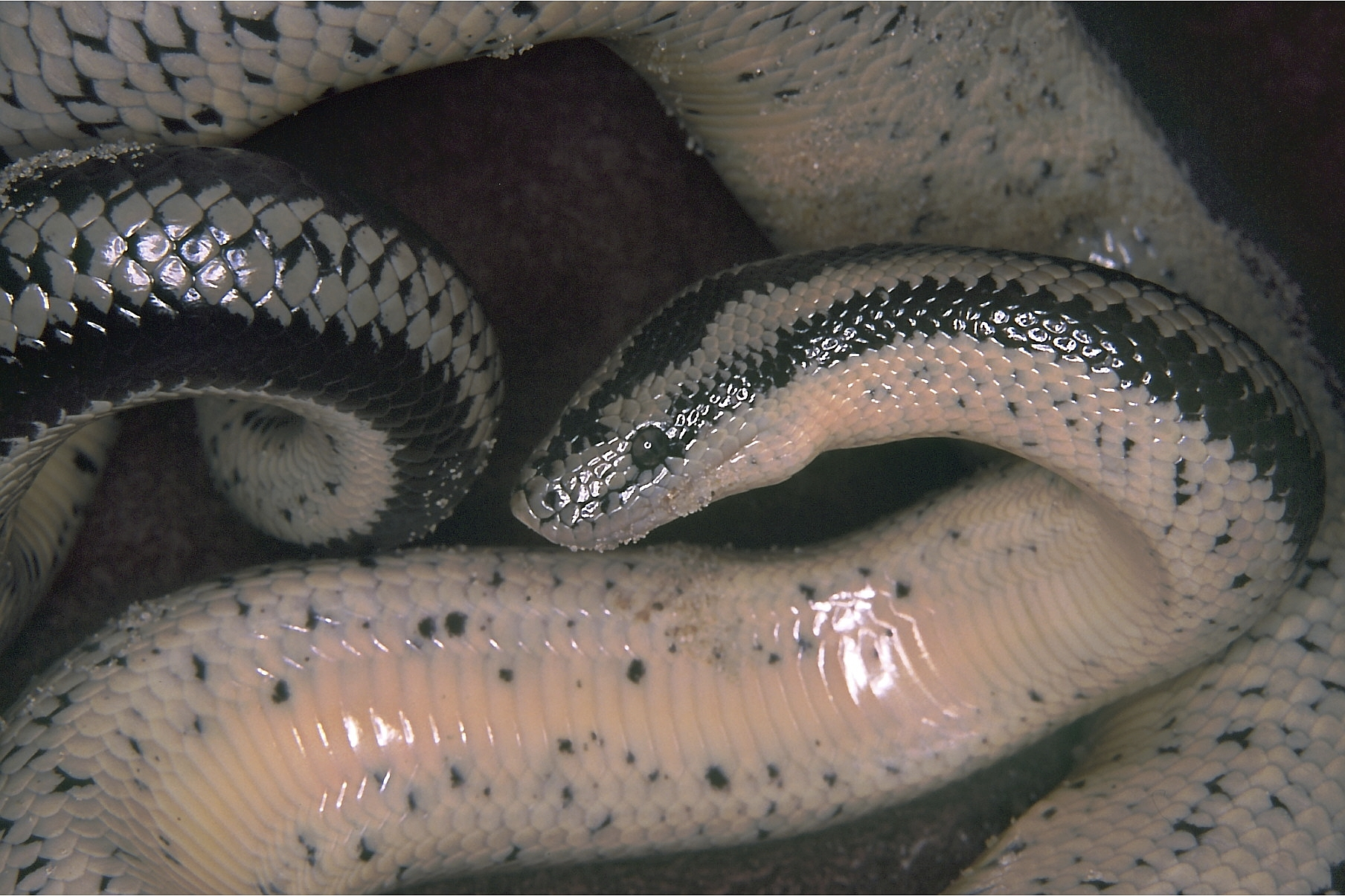

Conservation status
- Least Concern (IUCN 3.1)

Scientific classification
- Kingdom: Animalia
- Phylum: Chordata
- Class: Reptilia
- Order: Squamata
- Suborder: Serpentes
- Family: Boidae
- Genus: Lichanura
- Species: L. trivirgata

Binomial name
- Lichanura trivirgata Cope, 1861
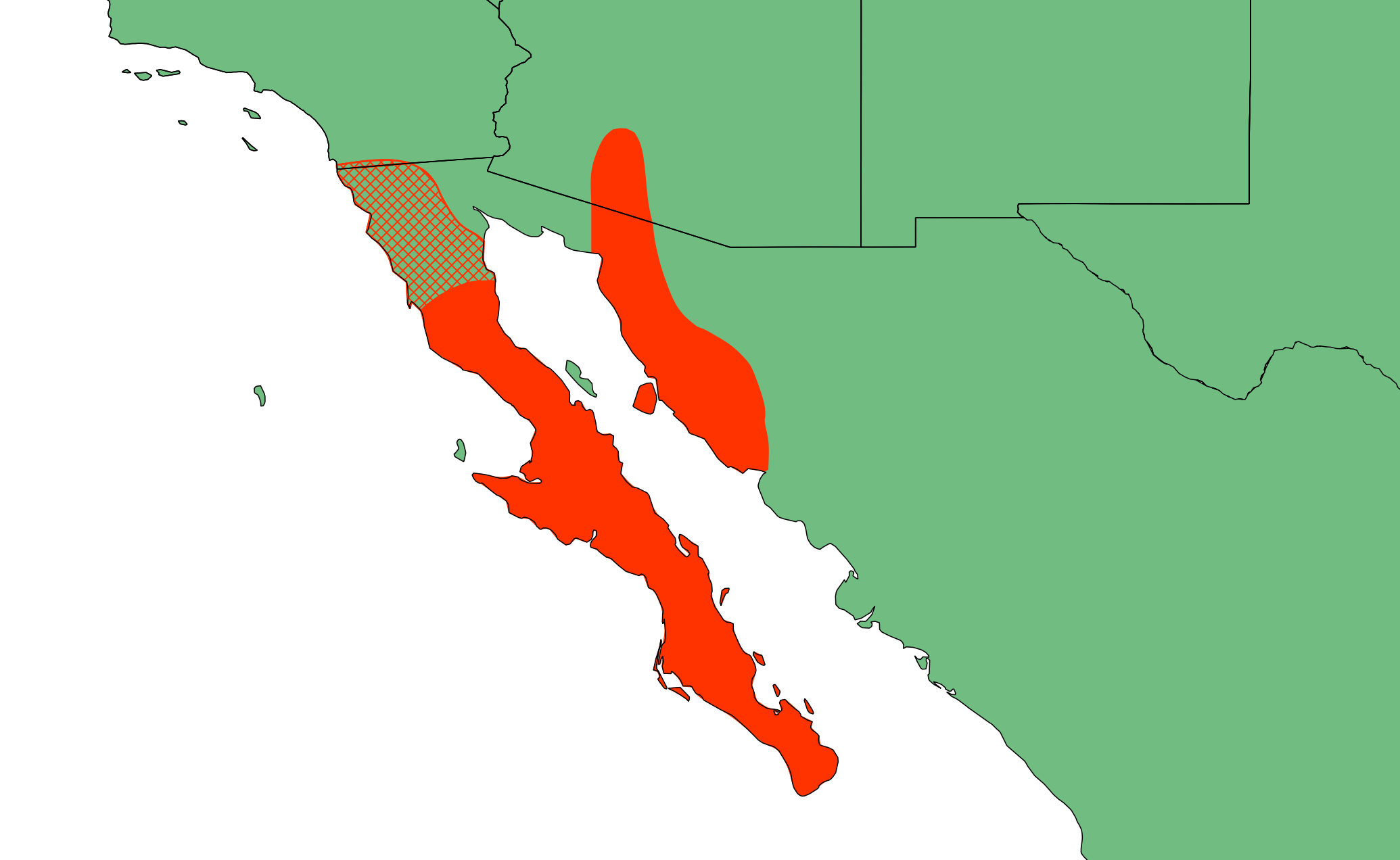
- The hashed area is disputed; it may have Lichanura orcutti.

Synonyms
- Lichanura trivirgata Cope, 1861; Lichanura roseofusca Cope, 1868; Lichanura myriolepis Cope, 1868; Charina trivirgata — Kluge, 1993; Lichanura trivirgata — Liner, 1994; Charina trivirgata — McDiarmid, Campbell & Touré, 1999; Lichanura trivirgata — Crother, 2000; Lichanura trivirgata — Wallach et al., 2014

= Desert rosy boa =

Species of reptile

The desert rosy boa (Lichanura trivirgata) is a species of snake in the family Boidae. The desert rosy boa is native to the American Southwest and Baja California and Sonora in Mexico. The desert rosy boa is one of four species in the boa family native to the continental United States, the other three being the coastal rosy boa (Lichanura orcutti) and the two species of rubber boas (Charina).

== Taxonomy ==
Edward Drinker Cope described the species in 1861. The specific epithet trivirgata refers to the distinct three stripes characteristic of the species. Some researchers have placed the species in the genus Charina with the rubber boas (see Synonyms). Newer phylogenetic research supports the original arrangement, but herpetologists still do not agree on rosy boa taxonomy. The subspecific designations are just as uncertain, with many authorities not accepting L. t. arizonae or L. t. saslowi, and others not recognizing any of the subspecies as being valid.

=== Subspecies ===
Four subspecies at the most are recognized:

- Arizona rosy boa, L. t. arizonae Spiteri, 1991
- desert rosy boa, L. t. gracia Klauber, 1931 – ground color laced with pink, orange, or tan well-defined longitudinal stripes
- Baja rosy boa, L. t. saslowi Spiteri, 1987
- Mexican rosy boa, L. t. trivirgata Cope, 1861 – ground color laced with pale cream broad longitudinal stripes

== Description ==
Considered a small snake, the desert rosy boa normally attains a total length (including tail) of 43–112 cm (17–44 in). Exact length varies by subspecies. Desert rosy boas are one of the smaller members of the family Boidae. A large adult has a body width about the diameter of a golf ball. Coloration of the desert rosy boa is highly variable, and usually locale-specific. Some individuals display a rosy or salmon coloration that is common on their underside; most rosy boa specimens do not have this ventral coloration, but instead have a series of dark to orange spots on a light-colored background.

Almost all specimens of the desert rosy boa have at least some trace of three longitudinal stripes, one down the center of the back, and two on the lower sides. The appearance of these stripes varies widely, from extremely straight and having high contrast with the interspaces, to extremely broken with almost no contrast with the interspaces. Stripe colors can be orange, maroon, rust, brown, or black. Interspace colors can be shades of light to dark gray, yellow, or tan.

== Distribution and habitat ==
The desert rosy boa is found in the Aridoamerica ecoregion, in the southwestern United States in the states of California and Arizona, and northwestern Mexico in the states of Baja California and Sonora. In California, the species inhabits extreme southern San Diego County, California within the Tijuana River and Otay watersheds. In Arizona, the desert rosy boa occupies the western areas of the Sonoran Desert. In Sonora, the desert rosy boa ranges from the border with the United States south throughout the Sonoran Desert to at least as far south as Ortiz. In Baja California, the desert rosy boa is almost ubiquitous ranging throughout the entire peninsula except in areas of extremely dry or rockless desert.

== Behavior ==
The desert rosy boa spends most of its life concealed beneath rocks and in crevices to escape the elements and natural predators. Granite outcroppings are the most common geologic association inhabited by the desert rosy boa. Less often, it is found in association with volcanic or other rock types. Only in rare places does the desert rosy boa inhabit rockless environments. In areas with few rocks, the desert rosy boa uses rodent burrows for concealment.

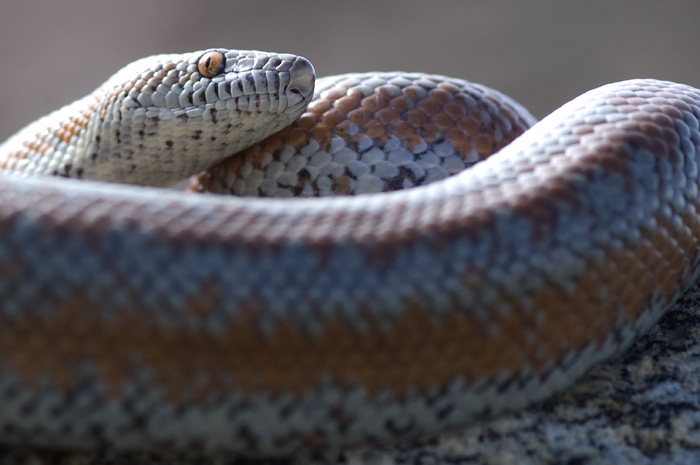
Desert rosy boa

The desert rosy boa's activity season follows local weather patterns; however, it is generally dormant during the winter, and active during the spring, summer, and fall. Like all snakes, it is dependent on external temperatures to promote such normal bodily functions as digestion and gestation. Throughout most of its range, the winter is too cold for these functions and the desert rosy boa goes into a dormant state called brumation. The spring is breeding season, resulting in its highest rate of activity. Most specimens of the desert rosy boa are encountered in spring as they leave the security of their rock piles and crevices to seek mates. Another reason why the desert rosy boa may be active on the surface of the ground is to find prey or new territory.

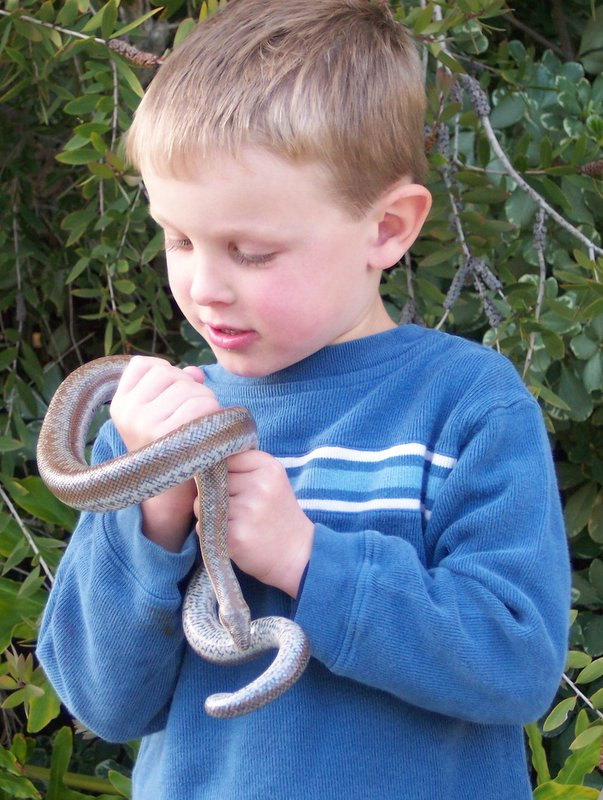
A desert rosy boa from Riverside, California, exhibiting its docile nature

The surface activity of the desert rosy boa can take place during any hour of the day, but during hot weather, it is primarily nocturnal. In the spring, it is often out in the afternoon and early evening. In the late spring and summer, this activity period switches from dusk to late into the night. Because most populations of the desert rosy boa live in exceedingly dry habitats, activity is often highly moisture-dependent. During dry periods it remains deep underground to assist in remaining hydrated. Recent rainfall often results in a flurry of surface activity.

The desert rosy boa forages mainly for small mammals (such as rodents), but has occasionally been known to take other prey items, such as lizards, amphibians, other snakes, birds and their chicks, and mammals (such as bats). Pack rats, baby rabbits, deer mice, and kangaroo rats make up a large portion of its diet. The desert rosy boa is one of the slowest-moving species of snakes in the world. It is unable to pursue prey and must either wait in ambush or stalk its meals. When a meal is within reach, usually a few inches, a desert rosy boa strikes with surprising speed and accuracy. Prey is secured with tiny rows of needle-sharp teeth, then suffocated through constriction.

The desert rosy boa is extremely docile when encountered by humans. When disturbed, it usually rolls into a compact ball with the head in the center. The species is not prone to bite in defense, but rather will release a foul-smelling musk from the base of the tail when threatened. When human bites have occurred, they have usually been the result of a feeding response with a captive animal. The desert rosy boa is nonvenomous. Its extreme docility, few needs, and attractive coloration have made the desert rosy boa popular with herpetoculturists.

== Reproduction ==
The desert rosy boa bears live young, about six in a brood, with newborns up to 30 cm (12 in) in length.

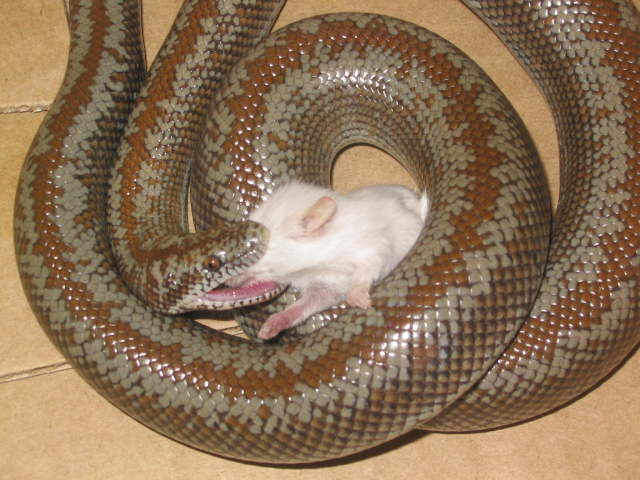
Pet desert rosy boa eating a mouse

== In captivity ==
Its generally docile temperament and small size make the desert rosy boa an ideal choice for a pet snake. It is frequently captive bred, and different color variations are available in captivity due to selective breeding. With good care, desert rosy boa are capable of living 30+ years in captivity.
