= List of Wildlife Management Areas in Arkansas =

This is a list of Wildlife Management Areas in Arkansas. All counties are represented except Boone, Chicot, Crittenden, Dallas, Fulton, Grant, Jackson, Lincoln, and St. Francis County.

Wildlife Management Areas in Arkansas
Name	County or counties	Area (acres)	Year Established	Remarks	Image
Bayou Des Arc WMA	White	953	1966	Created with a 320-acre public fishing lake.	
Bayou Meto WMA	Arkansas, Jefferson	33,832		Called the "George H. Dunklin Jr. Bayou Meto WMA" and also called "Wabbaseka Scatters" or just the "Scatters".	
Beaver Lake WMA	Benton, Carroll, Madison	8,007		Includes Devil's Eyebrow Natural Area.	
Bell Slough WMA	Faulkner	2,040		Kenny Vernon Nature Trail and Bell Slough Water Trail.	
Benson Creek Natural Area WMA	Monroe	1,458		Includes 610 acres of bald cypress/water tupelo swamps along Bayou DeView.	
Beryl Anthony Lower Ouachita WMA	Ashley, Union	7,020		3,600 new acres to be added in 2018 and 2019. The WMA joins the Moro Big Pine WMA and the Warren Prairie Natural Area WMA having colonies of Red cockaded woodpeckers.	
Big Lake WMA	Mississippi	12,320	1950	7,000 acres purchased in 1950. The rest purchased up to 1969.	
Big Timber WMA	Clark	45,000		Includes 3,500 acres (Olds Foundation) added in 2018. Also known as Big Timber Leased Lands WMA. Private land owners including The Ross Foundation, Clark Timberlands, Anthony Timberlands. and Red River Texarkana that is managed by Hancock Forest Management giving annual leases to the Arkansas Game and Fish Commission.	
Blevins WMA	Hempstead	128	1991		
Blue Mountain WMA	Logan	8,200		Corps of Engineers property.	
Brewer Lake Cypress Creek WMA	Conway	1,200		Surrounds Brewer Lake.	
Brushy Creek WMA	Cross	215		Co-op of private land owners that have joined.	
Buffalo National River WMA	Baxter, Marion, Newton, Searcy	95,730		The entire 135 miles of the Buffalo National River is a WMA. Certain areas are also under national park regulations for hunting and fishing.	
Camp Robinson WMA	Faulkner, Pulaski	26,675			
Caney Creek WMA	Howard, Montgomery, Pike, Polk	85,000	1968	Contains Caney Creek Wilderness	
Casey Jones WMA	Ashley, Drew	83,832			
Cattail Marsh WMA	Greene	78			
Cedar Creek WMA	Scott	103			
Cherokee Prairie Natural Area WMA	Franklin	566			
Cherokee WMA	Cleburne, Conway, Independence, Logan, Pope, Scott, Stone, Van Buren	62,203			
Cove Creek Natural Area WMA	Faulkner	228			
Crossett Experimental Forest WMA	Ashley	1,675			
Cut-Off Creek WMA	Drew	9,314			
Cypress Bayou WMA	Lonoke, White	2,478			
Dardanelle WMA	Franklin, Johnson, Logan, Pope, Yell	42,658			
Dave Donaldson Black River WMA	Clay, Greene, Randolph	21,150			
DeGray Lake WMA	Clark, Hot Spring	14,000			
Departee Creek WMA	White	450			
DeQueen Lake WMA	Sevier	8,792		Owned by the U.S. Army Corps of Engineers.	
Devil’s Knob Natural Area WMWA	Izard	519			
Dr. Lester Sitzes III Bois D’Arc WMA	Hempstead	13,646			
Earl Buss Bayou DeView WMA	Poinsett	4,435			
Ed Gordon Point Remove WMA	Conway, Pope	8,694			
Electric Island WMA	Garland	115			
Ethel WMA	Arkansas	176		Formerly only open to residents of Ethel	
Falcon Bottoms Natural Area WMA	Columbia, Lafayette, Nevada	2,787			
Fort Chaffee WMA	Crawford, Franklin, Sebastian	66,000		The WMA is within Fort Chaffee Maneuver Training Center area. WMA rules are in effect and a Sportsman’s Orientation class is compulsory.	
Freddie Black Choctaw Island WMA Deer Research Area East Unit	Desha	8,300		Also referred to as the Choctaw Island WMA. The WMA is not a true island but includes the Choctaw Bar Island in the Mississippi River	
Freddie Black Choctaw Island WMA Deer Research Area West Unit	Desha				
Frog Bayou WMA	Crawford	812	2005	Partnership with Ducks Unlimited and the U.S. Natural Resources Conservation Service and expanded in 2017 with The Trust for Public Land and Federal Aid in Wildlife Restoration money. The WMA is located along Frog Bayou, that is also known as Clear Creek, adjacent to U.S. Army Corps of Engineers land.	
Galla Creek WMA	Pope	3,329		The Galla Creek WMA is among several others involving controversy of flooding protocols used in Greentree reservoir management that has seen deteriorated conditions and a substantial dying off of timber.	
Garrett Hollow Natural Area WMA	Washington	670			
Gene Rush WMA	Newton, Searcy	17,963			
Goat's Beard Bluff Natural Area WMA	Saline	540	2023	Along the Alum Fork of the Saline River in the transition zone between the Ouachita Mountains and Gulf Coastal Plain ecoregions	
Greers Ferry Lake WMA	Cleburne, Van Buren	9,914			
Gum Flats WMA	Howard, Pike	15,661			
H. E. Flanagan Prairie Natural Area WMA	Franklin	457		The Arkansas Natural Heritage Commission (ANHC), a division of the Department of Arkansas Heritage added the property in 1988. Along with the Presson-Oglesby Preserve (The Nature Conservancy, 155 acres), and the Cherokee Prairie (ANHC) are three contiguous tracts of protected prairie land.	
Hall Creek Barrens Natural Area WMA	Cleveland				
Harold E. Alexander Spring River WMA	Sharp	13,859			
Harris Brake WMA	Perry	3,769			
Henry Gray Hurricane Lake WMA	White	17,524			
Hobbs State Park – Conservation Area WMA	Benton, Carroll, Madison	11,744			
Holland Bottoms WMA	Lonoke	6,190			
Hope Upland WMA	Hempstead	2,115			
Hot Springs State Forest WMA	Garland	2974	2023	Contains the recharge area for hot springs near Hot Springs National Park, partially within city limits of Hot Springs, Arkansas	
Howard County WMA	Howard	26,000			
Howard Hensley Searcy County WMA	Searcy	170			
Iron Mountain Natural Area WMA	Polk	260			
Jamestown Independence County WMA	Independence	971			
Jim Kress WMA	Cleburne	14,527			
Jones Point WMA	Marion	1,200			
Kingsland Prairie Natural Area WMA	Cleveland	400			
Lafayette County Natural Area WMA	Lafayette	16,739			
Lake Greeson Natural Area WMA	Howard, Pike	200			
Lee County WMA	Lee	200			
Little Bayou WMA	Ashley	1,284			
Little River WMA	Hempstead, Little River	597			
Loafer’s Glory WMA		2,616			
Maumelle River WMA	Pulaski				
McIlroy Madison County WMA	Madison	14,496			Looking out into the Ozark forest from the Bluff Shelter at the Ozark Natural Science Center
Mike Freeze Wattensaw WMA	Prairie	19,184			
Moro Big Pine Natural Area WMA	Calhoun	16,000			
Mount Magazine WMA	Logan, Yell	120,000			
Muddy Creek WMA	Montgomery, Scott, Yell	146,206			
Nacatoch Ravines Natural Area WMA	Hempstead	645			
Nimrod/Lloyd Millwood WMA	Yell	3,550			
Norfork Lake WMA	Baxter	10,000			
Ozan WMA	Hempstead	580			
Ozark Lake WMA	Crawford, Franklin	7,834			
Palmetto Flats Natural Area	Little River	1848			
Petit Jean River WMA	Yell	15,502			
Pine City Natural Area WMA	Monroe	870			
Piney Creeks WMA	Johnson, Newton, Pope	180,000			
Poison Springs WMA	Nevada, Ouachita	17,604			
Prairie Bayou WMA	Lonoke	453			
Provo WMA	Sevier	11,327			
R. L. Hankins Mud Creek Upland WMA	Randolph	1,025	1989	Deeded by FMHA.	
Railroad Prairie Natural Area WMA	Prairie	244			
Rainey WMA	Pope	488			
Rex Hancock Black Swamp WMA	Woodruff	7,221			
Rick Evans Grandview Prairie WMA	Hempstead	4,885			
Ring Slough WMA	Clay	83			
River Bend WMA	Perry				
Roth Prairie Natural Area WMA	Arkansas	41			
Sandhills Natural Area WMA	Miller	143			
Scott Henderson Gulf Mountain WMA	Van Buren	14,000	1970	Created as "Gulf Mountain WMA" with an initial purchase of 6,400 acres. A 3,600-acre purchase and smaller tracts totaling 2,012 was added in 1971. 2,000 acres of Green Bay Packaging's Arkansas Mill division land was added to the WMA. The company owns over 250,000 acres in the state and this was part of the companies "Sustainable Forestry Initiative". Located 12 miles southwest of Clinton the Little Red River bisects the southern area and the Ozark National Forest is the northern boundary.	
Seven Devils WMA	Drew	5,032			
Sheffield Nelson Dagmar WMA	Monroe	9,720			
Shirey Bay Rainey Brake WMA	Lawrence	10,711			
Slippery Hollow Natural Area WMA	Marion	705			
Spring Bank WMA	Lafayette	701			
St. Francis National Forest WMA	Lee, Phillips				
St. Francis Sunken Lands WMA	Craighead, Greene, Poinsett, Clay	27,643		Patchwork of state and privately held lands along the St. Francis River preserving bottomland hardwood forest river bottoms, well known for waterfowl and deer hunting.	
Stateline Sandponds Natural Area WMA	Clay	4,000			
Steve N. Wilson Raft Creek Bottoms WMA	White	4,000			
Sugarloaf Mountains-Midland Peak Natural Area WMA	Sebastian	1191	2023		
Sulphur River WMA	Miller	16,681			
Sweden Creek Natural Area WMA	Madison	137			
Sylamore WMA	Baxter, Marion, Searcy, Stone	150,000			
Terre Noire Natural Area WMA	Clark	415			
Trusten Holder WMA	Arkansas, Desha	8,173			
Two Bayou Creek WMA	Ouachita	1,250			
W.E. Brewer Scatter Creek WMA	Greene				
Warren Prairie Natural Area WMA	Bradley, Drew	2,128			
Wedington WMA	Benton, Washington	16,000			
White Cliffs Natural Area WMA	Little River	573			
White Rock WMA	Crawford, Franklin, Johnson, Madison, Franklin, Washington	280,000			
Whitehall WMA	Poinsett	111			
Winona WMA	Garland, Perry, Saline	160,000			

== Former WMAs ==
Wildlife Management Areas in Arkansas
Name	County or counties	Area (acres)	Year Established	Year Dissolved	Remarks
Ozark National Forest WMA	Conway, Crawford, Frankliln, Johnson, Madison, Newton, Pope, Searcy, Van Buren, Washington	678,878		2023	Merged into neighboring WMAs
