= List of National Natural Landmarks in Arkansas =

There are 5 National Natural Landmarks in Arkansas. Four are forests and one is a spring.

Arkansas National Natural Landmarks (clickable map)

Name	Image	Date	Location	County	Ownership	Description
Big Lake Natural Area		1974	35°54′48.61″N 90°7′3.4″W	Mississippi	Federal	Forest area within Big Lake National Wildlife Refuge.
Lake Winona Research Natural Area		1976	34°48′50.4″N 92°56′20.4″W	Saline	Federal	Pine forest near Lake Winona (Arkansas); part of Ouachita National Forest.
Mammoth Spring		1972	36.4978°N 91.5359°W	Fulton	State	The largest first magnitude spring in Arkansas, it is connected underground to the Grand Gulf State Park in Missouri.
Roaring Branch Research Natural Area		1976	34°22′22.8″N 93°58′40.8″W	Polk	Federal	Steep ravine with a virgin forest in Ouachita National Forest.
White River Sugarberry Natural Area		1974	34°21′0″N 91°6′0″W	Desha	Federal	Virgin hardwood bottomland forest in White River National Wildlife Refuge.

== See also ==
- List of National Historic Landmarks in Arkansas
