= Wenonah =

Wenonah may refer to:

== Literature ==
- Wenonah, Hiawatha's mother in Longfellow's 1855 poem The Song of Hiawatha

== Places ==
United States

- Wenonah, Alabama, a community of ore mining camps near Birmingham, Alabama
- Wenonah, Illinois, a village
- Wenonah, New Jersey, a borough
- Wenonah, Minneapolis, a neighborhood in Minneapolis, Minnesota
- Wenonah Lodge, an Adirondack great camp on Upper Saranac Lake built for Jules Bache about 1915

== Schools ==
United States

- Wenonah School District, in Wenonah, New Jersey
- Wenonah Elementary School, an elementary school in the Sachem School District on Long Island in New York
- Wenonah High School, in Birmingham, Alabama

== Vessels ==
- USS Wenonah (SP-165), a yacht acquired by the U.S. Navy during World War I, also designated as USC&GS Wenonah and USS Wenonah (PY-11)
- USS Wenonah (YT-148), a harbor tugboat in service from World War II until 1974
- Wenonah (1866), a steamship that navigated lakes in Muskoka, Ontario, Canada
- Wenonah II, a replica steam vessel operating in Muskoka, Ontario

== See also ==
- Wenona (disambiguation)
- Winona (disambiguation)
