= Snyder Lake =

Lake in Montana, United States of America

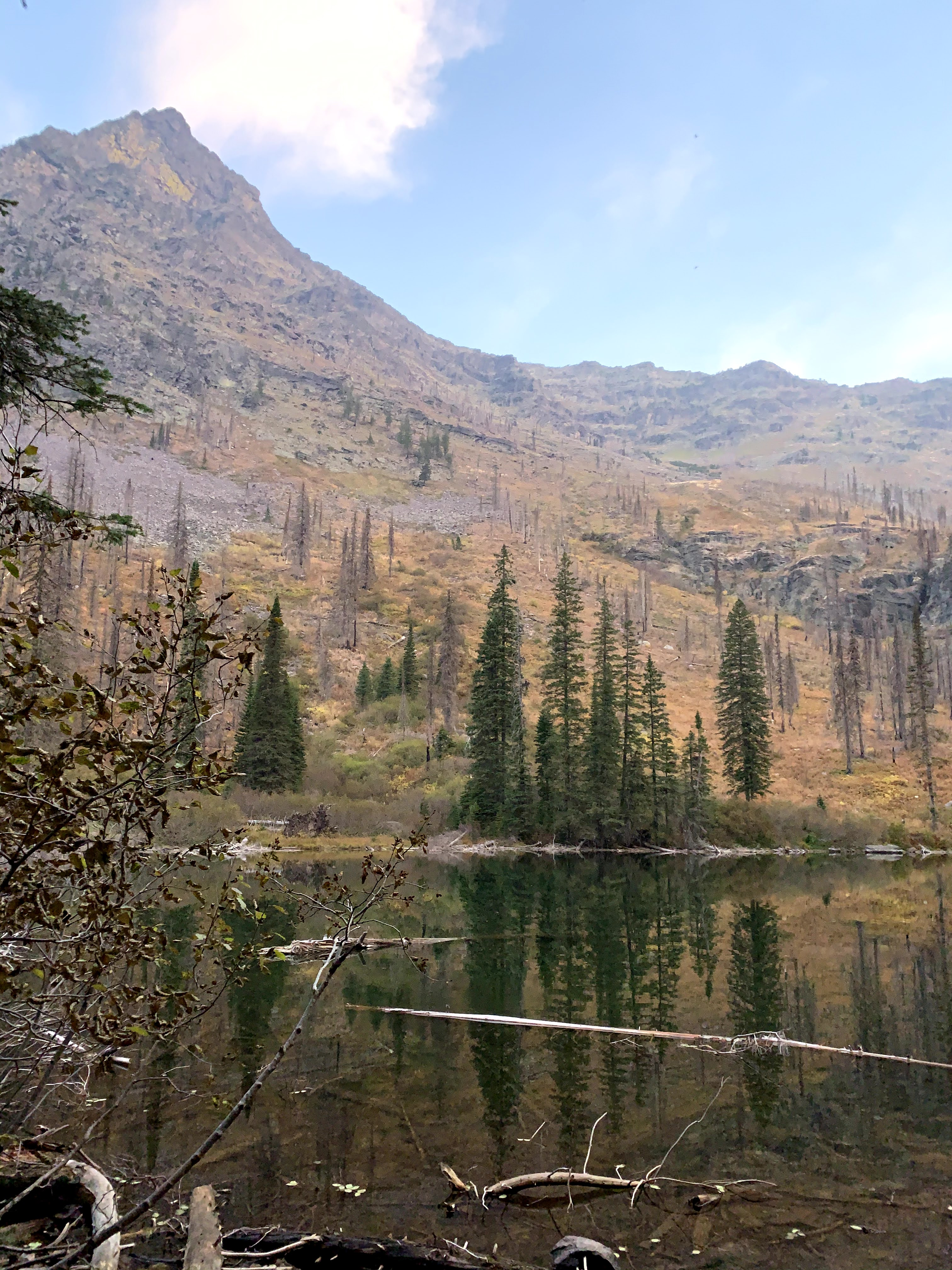
- A view of the lake from the campground shortly after sunrise

- Location within Montana Location within the United States
- Location: Glacier National Park, Flathead County, Montana, US
- Coordinates: 48°37′38″N 113°48′09″W
- Type: Natural
- Primary outflows: Snyder Creek
- Basin countries: United States
- Max. length: .15 mi (0.24 km)
- Max. width: .08 mi (0.13 km)
- Surface elevation: 5,246 ft (1,599 m)

Snyder Lake is located in Glacier National Park, in the U. S. state of Montana. Snyder Lake is south-southwest of Upper Snyder Lake.

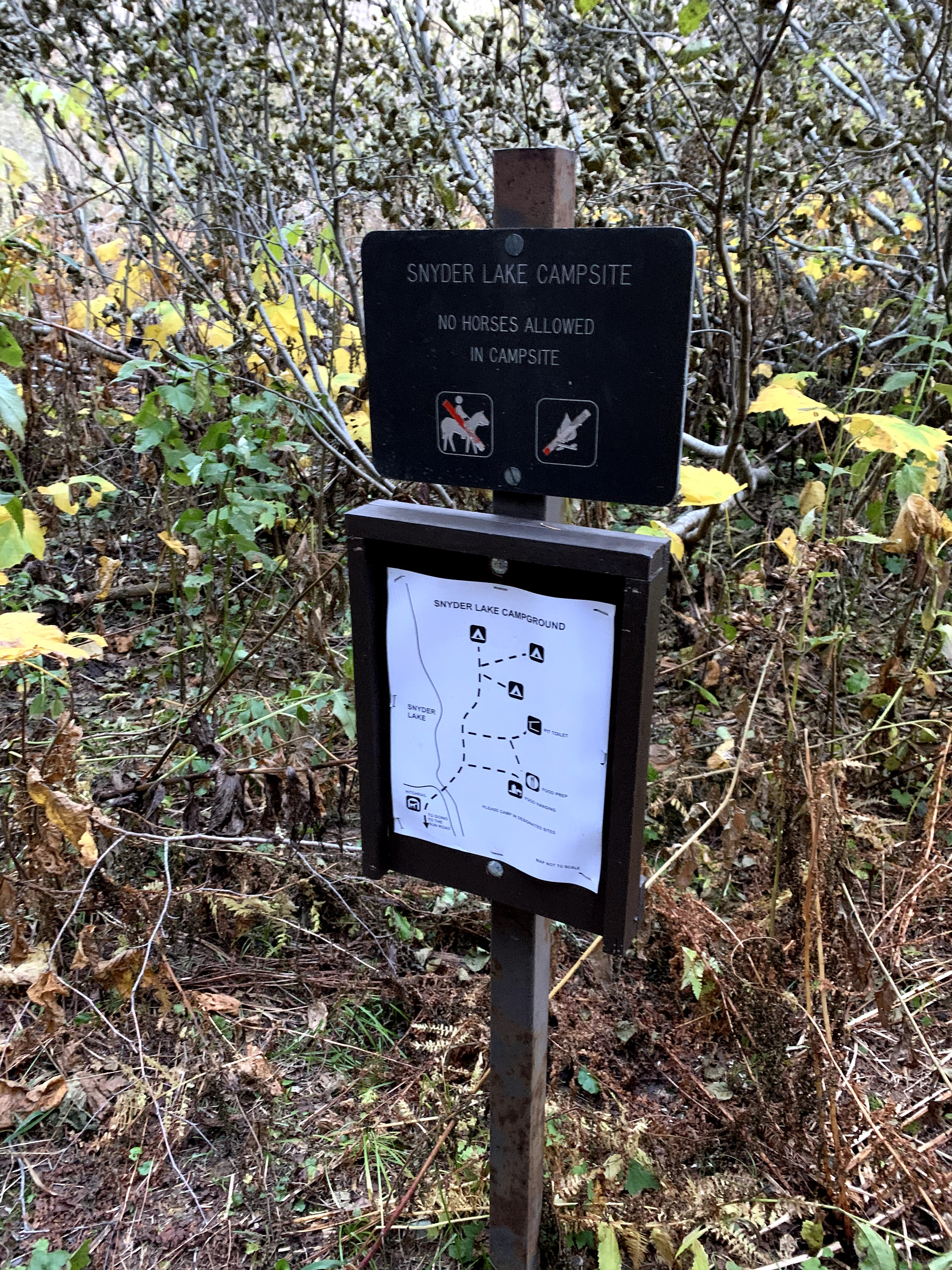
A sign at the Snyder Lake campground

== See also ==
- List of lakes in Flathead County, Montana (M-Z)
