= Trout Lake (Flathead County, Montana) =

Lake in the American state of Montana

- Location within Montana Location within the United States
- Location: Glacier National Park, Flathead County, Montana, US
- Coordinates: 48°40′49″N 113°54′36″W
- Type: Natural
- Primary inflows: Camas Creek
- Primary outflows: Camas Creek
- Basin countries: United States
- Max. length: 1.50 mi (2.41 km)
- Max. width: .30 mi (0.48 km)
- Surface elevation: 3,903 ft (1,190 m)

Trout Lake is located in Glacier National Park, in the U. S. state of Montana. Trout Lake is situated in the Camas Valley, and is 1.25 miles (2.01 km) southwest of Arrow Lake and 1 mile (1.6 km) northeast of Rogers Lake. Nearby mountains include Rogers Peak to the west. Trout Lake is a hike of 7 miles (11 km) from the North Fork Road.

== See also ==
List of lakes in Flathead County, Montana (M-Z)
