= Winona (name) =

- Gender: Feminine

Origin
- Origin: Dakota
- Meaning: "firstborn daughter"

Winona is a feminine given name, an Anglicized form of the Dakota descriptive term, Winúŋna, meaning "firstborn daughter."

== People ==
- Winona Cargile Alexander (1893–1984), African-American activist
- Winona Grace MacInnis (born 1905), Canadian politician
- Winona LaDuke (born 1959), Native American activist
- Winona Oak (born 1994), Swedish singer-songwriter
- Winona Ryder (born 1971), American actress
- Wynona Carr (1924–76), African-American gospel, R&B and rock and roll singer-songwriter
- Wynona Lipman (c. 1932–99), American politician and New Jersey state senator
- Wynonna Judd (born 1964), American country singer

== Fictional characters ==
- Winona, lead in the film Pink Skies Ahead
- Wenonah, the mother of Hiawatha in Longfellow's epic poem The Song of Hiawatha (1855)
- Winona, legendary Dakota figure who committed suicide
- Winona, a character in the Pokémon universe
- Winona Kirk, the mother of Star Trek's James T. Kirk
- Winona, romantic interest of Jerry Seinfeld in The Cigar Store Indian
- Winona, in the Sebastian Barry novel Days Without End: adopted daughter of John Cole, one of the two main protagonists
- Winona, Applejack’s dog in My Little Pony: Friendship is Magic
- Wynonna, main character (portrayed by Melanie Scrofano) in the show Wynonna Earp
- Winona Pickford, a supporting character of Tales of Phantasia
- Winona, a character in the British children's television series Rubbadubbers
