= Striped Elk Lake =

Lake in the American state of Montana

- Location within Montana Location within the United States
- Location: Glacier National Park, Flathead County, Montana, US
- Coordinates: 48°24′06″N 113°31′28″W
- Type: Natural
- Basin countries: United States
- Max. length: .30 mi (0.48 km)
- Max. width: .20 mi (0.32 km)
- Surface elevation: 6,294 ft (1,918 m)

Striped Elk Lake is located in Glacier National Park, in the U. S. state of Montana. Striped Elk Lake is 1.25 miles (2.01 km) northeast of Mount Saint Nicholas.

== See also ==
- List of lakes in Flathead County, Montana (M-Z)
