= Winona, Tennessee =

Winona may refer to places in the U.S. state of Tennessee:

- Winona, Putnam County, Tennessee, an unincorporated community
- Winona, Scott County, Tennessee, an unincorporated community
