= Rogers Lake (Flathead County, Montana) =

Lake in the American state of Montana

- Location within Montana Location within the United States
- Location: Glacier National Park, Flathead County, Montana, US
- Coordinates: 48°39′39″N 113°56′17″W
- Type: Natural
- Primary inflows: Camas Creek
- Primary outflows: Camas Creek
- Basin countries: United States
- Max. length: .60 mi (0.97 km)
- Max. width: .30 mi (0.48 km)
- Surface elevation: 3,793 ft (1,156 m)

Rogers Lake is located in Glacier National Park, in the U. S. state of Montana. Rogers Lake is situated in the Camas Valley, and is 1 mile (1.6 km) southwest of Trout Lake. Nearby mountains include Rogers Peak to the north.

== See also ==
- List of lakes in Flathead County, Montana (M-Z)
