= Winona (legend) =

Dakota Sioux romantic figure

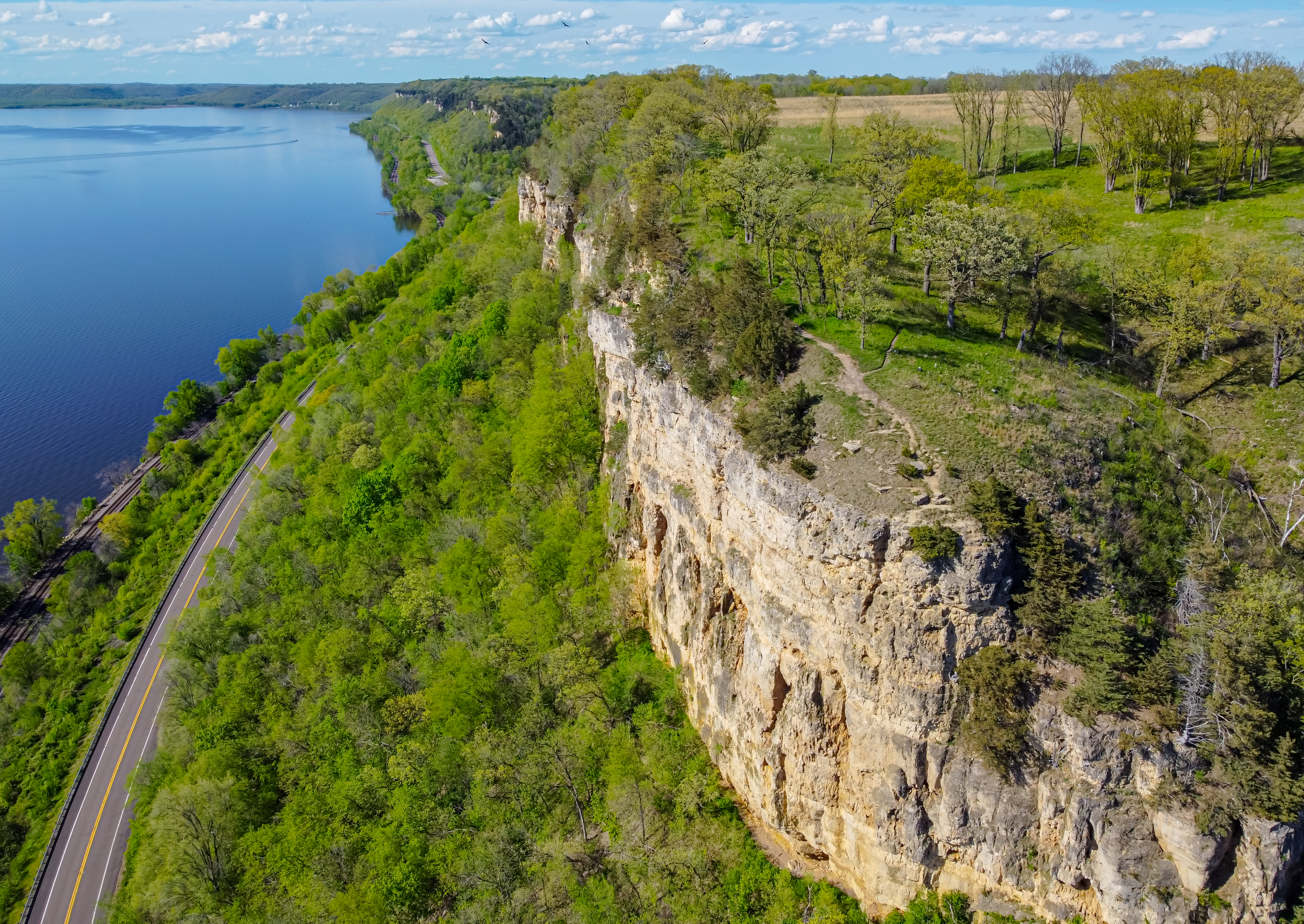
Maiden Rock

Winona or Wenonah is a Dakota Sioux character in a "Lover's Leap" romantic legend set at Maiden Rock, which is on the Wisconsin side of Lake Pepin in the United States. Winona is said to have leaped to her death from this high precipice rather than marry a suitor she did not love. This theme is found in a number of apocryphal, post-contact tales in the place-name lore of North America.

== The legend ==
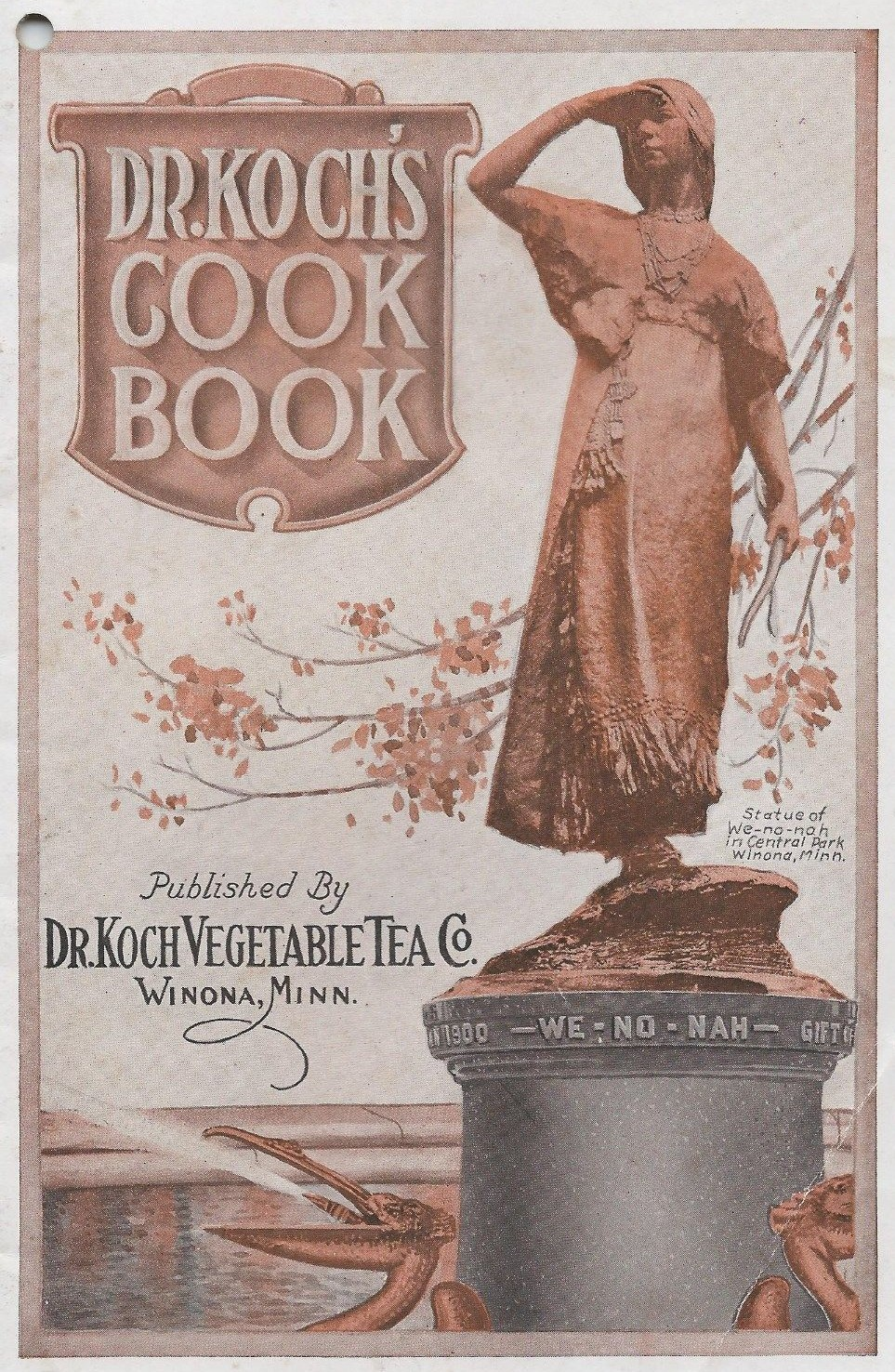
Photo of the statue in Central Park, Winona, MN, here seen on the cover of a promotional cookbook.

There are several variations of the story. Winona's father is sometimes said to be Chief Wabasha (Wapasha) of a village identified as Keoxa, now known as Winona, Minnesota, or perhaps Chief Red Wing of what is now Red Wing, Minnesota. Rather than marry a suitor she does not love, Winona chooses to leap from the cliff of Maiden Rock to her death.

The suitor depends on the version of the tale. Some versions feature him as a French trapper; others say he is a Native American of another tribe. In Last of the Mohicans the man is a brutal murderer, and the young woman chooses death over life as a slave or battered woman.

In the version recounted by Charles Eastman, Winona's personal name was Tatiyopa, and the suitor was a Dakota named Matasopa. However, in Eastman's retelling, Winona survives and marries Matasopa.

== Analysis ==
Similar tales are told in many places in the Midwestern United States, as well as the apocryphal legend of a young Cherokee woman of Noccalula Falls Park in Gadsden, Alabama. The journals of Zebulon Pike (1805) contain a brief mention of the legend; this is the earliest instance of it being recorded and mentioned by a European American.

In the traditional Dakota language, "Winona" is not a personal name, but a general term for a first-born child of any class distinction who happens to be female.

In some lore she is called "Princess Winona". However, the title "princess" is a European-American invention, as Dakota people do not have such title or term.

Today "Winona" has become regularly used as a personal and place name throughout the United States.

== The location ==
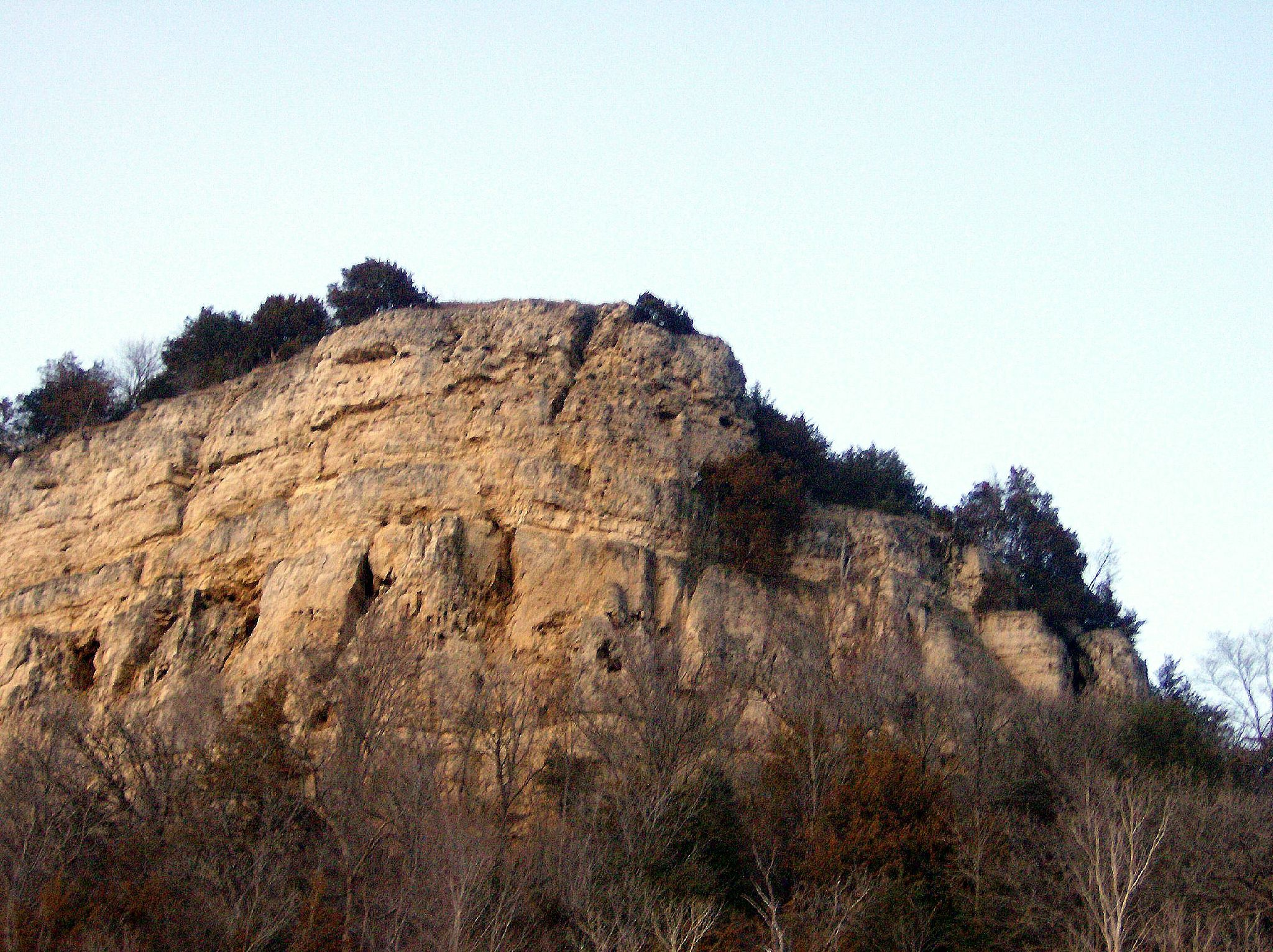
Maiden Rock at Lake Pepin. One of many bluffs said to be the precipice from which Winona jumped.

Winona, Minnesota is associated with the legend because it was formerly the site of Keoxa. The character of Winona has entered popular regional culture. The name has been featured in Watkins Incorporated advertising, a prominent statue (currently located by Huff St. between 5th and 6th Streets after being located in other city parks), a stained glass window, and elsewhere.

While the Upper Mississippi version of the legend is the most prominent, there are other sites with variations of this legend.

Mark Twain in Life on the Mississippi wrote: "There are fifty Lover's Leaps along the Mississippi from whose summit disappointed Indian girls have jumped." Other Lover's Leap locations with a similar legend include Winona Falls in Pennsylvania, Camden County, Missouri and Cameron Park in Waco, Texas.

== Adaptations ==
- Legends of the Northwest, by Hanford Lennox Gordon (1836–1920), contains a lengthy poetic version of this story, entitled "Winona, a Legend of the Dakotas"
- A sculpture of the Indian Maiden Wenonah is located in downtown Winona, Minnesota at Windom Park. and was donated by William J. Landon in memory of his wife Ida Cone Landon in 1900.
- Emilio DeGrazia, a professor of Winona State University, and a published author, wrote a short play about her life entitled Winona: A Romantic Tragedy. This play has been performed on stage and published in book form.

== See also ==
- List of place names in the United States of Native American origin
