= Upper Snyder Lake =

Lake in Flathead County, Montana, United States

- Location within Montana Location within the United States
- Location: Glacier National Park, Flathead County, Montana, US
- Coordinates: 48°37′50″N 113°47′41″W
- Type: Natural
- Primary outflows: Snyder Creek
- Basin countries: United States
- Max. length: .25 mi (0.40 km)
- Max. width: .15 mi (0.24 km)
- Surface elevation: 5,574 ft (1,699 m)

Upper Snyder Lake is located in Glacier National Park, in the U. S. state of Montana. Upper Snyder Lake is NNE of Snyder Lake.

== See also ==
- List of lakes in Flathead County, Montana (M-Z)
