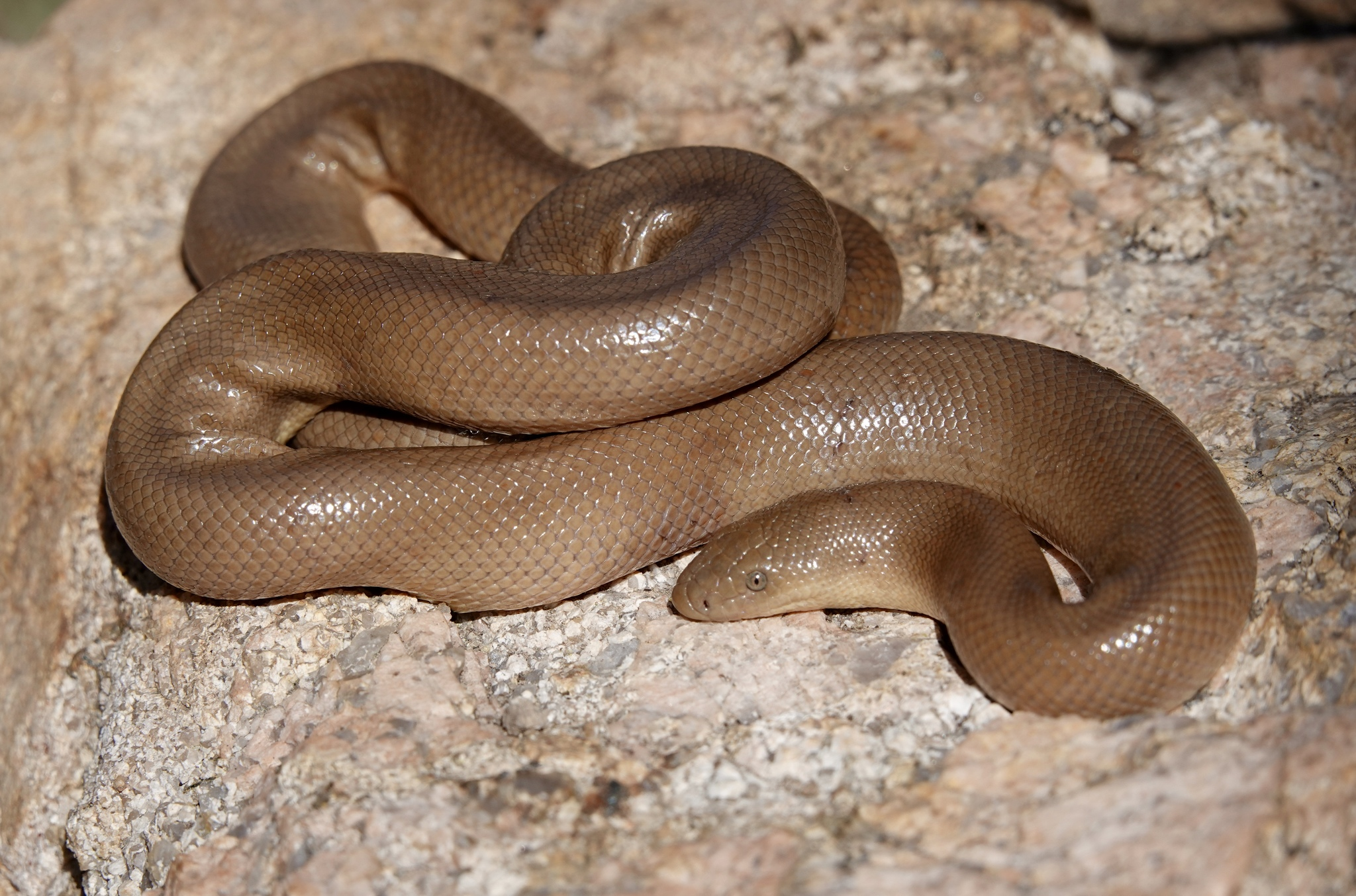

Conservation status
- Vulnerable (IUCN 3.1)

- Imperiled (NatureServe)

Scientific classification
- Kingdom: Animalia
- Phylum: Chordata
- Class: Reptilia
- Order: Squamata
- Suborder: Serpentes
- Family: Boidae
- Genus: Charina
- Species: C. umbratica

Binomial name
- Charina umbratica Klauber, 1943
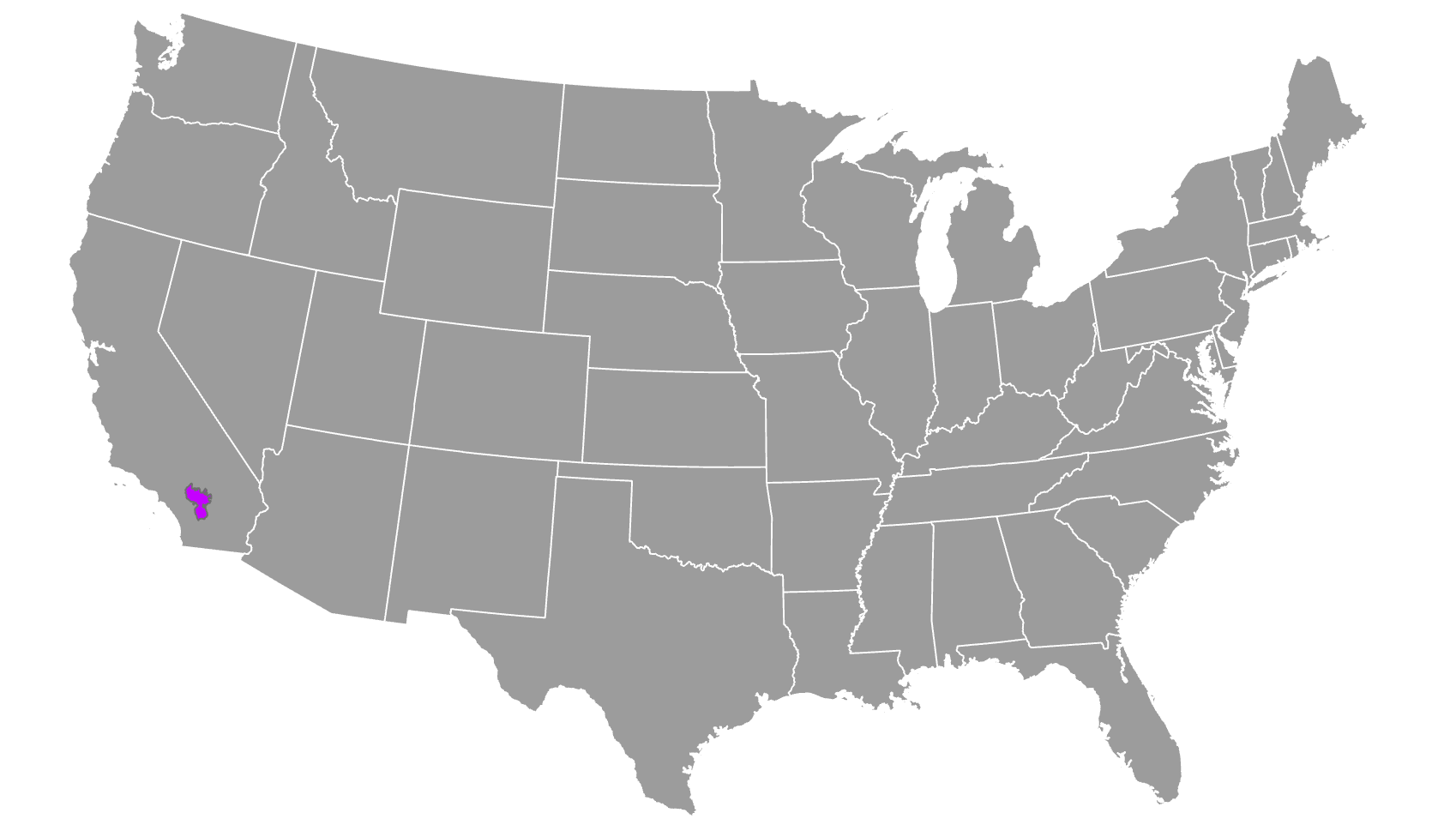
- Southern rubber boa range

Synonyms
- Charina bottae umbratica Klauber, 1943; Charina umbratica — Rodríguez-Robles et al., 2001

= Southern rubber boa =

Species of snake

Charina umbratica, known commonly as the southern rubber boa, is a species of snake in the family Boidae. The species is endemic to the United States, in southern California.

== Taxonomy ==
The southern rubber boa, also known as Charina umbratica, has been proposed as an independent species because of its morphological and geographic differences. A study published in 2001 concluded that Charina umbratica is separated from its subclade. This means that the southern rubber boa and its subclades have allopatric distributions. All evidence gathered from the mitochondrial DNA study points to consider Charina umbratic as a distinct species. Despite the distinction of the two subclades, a more recent study suggests that grounds for distinction of clades may be invalid as range movements may not be as thoroughly studied and contextualized as previously considered.

== Conservation status ==
As of April 2017, the southern rubber boa was listed as a state threatened species in the California Natural Diversity Database.

== Description ==
The southern rubber boa is a small snake with a blunt tail. Due to its secretive nature, it makes it very difficult to collect these snakes for data. However, a five-year study done in the San Bernardino Mountains of southern California has been able to provide information on this reptile. The study was published in the Journal of Herpetology, and concluded that the female boas' length and weight out-performed the male boas. In addition, adult female boas were found to have greater percentages of tail tip scarring and tail shortening when compared to males. Furthermore, this study also explored the weight loss that happens during gestation for female boas and determined that female boas lose 47% of their weight during gestation.

== Habitat ==
The southern rubber boa is known to typically inhabit areas such woodlands and coniferous forests characterized by their developed soils and great vegetative productivity. These areas are typically moist and may contain accumulated organic debris that are largely-responsible for the moisture levels of inhabited sites. The southern rubber boa makes use of outcrops, loose and developed soils, as well as tree-debris to burrow and seek refuge.

== Distribution ==
The southern rubber boa is distributed across the San Bernardino and San Jacinto Mountains east of Los Angeles in southern California, at elevations between 4,900 and 7,900 feet. Phylogenetic analyses have conclusively distinguished northern and southern boas and identified an area in Northeastern California containing populations of both subspecies. Some intergrades between northern and southern boas have been located in isolated populations in the Southern Los Padres Ranges.

== Behavior ==
A five-year study done in the San Bernardino Mountains of southern California analyzed the diet and behavior of the southern rubber boa. This study discussed the behavior of the southern rubber boa and its distinct tendency to eat lizard eggs, rather than the lizards themselves. The behavior exhibited from the southern rubber boa to eat the lizard eggs and not the lizard, is what separates the southern rubber boa from other rubber boas. In like manner, this study also found that female boa injuries are primarily received through other animals protecting their young from boa predation.

== Reproduction ==
Boas are ovoviviparous – they produce between two and eight young snakes where eggs are hatched within the parent. In April, female boas typically emerge from hibernation under reproductive conditions; mating occurs immediately and persists through May. They give birth between late summer and throughout autumn with a greater majority of young birthed between late August through September.

== Predators ==
Known predators of the southern rubber boa include kingsnakes (Lampropeltis sp.) and California striped racer (Masticophis lateralis). Other local reptilian predators presumed to prey on the southern rubber boa include ring-necked snakes (Diadophis punctatus) and night snakes (Hypsiglena torquata).
