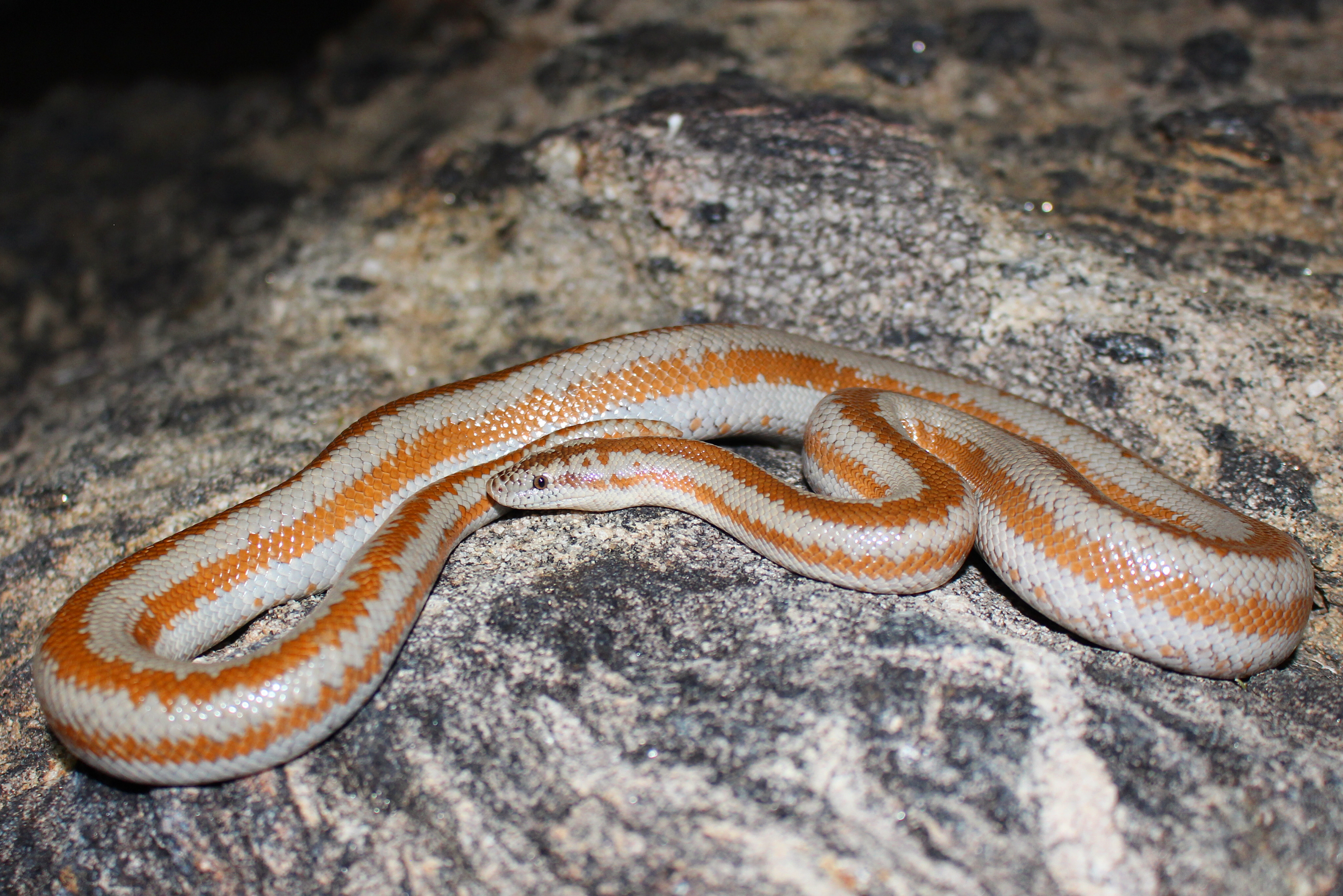
- Lichanura orcutti

Scientific classification
- Kingdom: Animalia
- Phylum: Chordata
- Class: Reptilia
- Order: Squamata
- Suborder: Serpentes
- Family: Boidae
- Subfamily: Erycinae
- Genus: Lichanura; Cope, 1861

Type species
- Lichanura trivirgata Cope, 1861

Species
- 2 species (see text)

= Lichanura =

Genus of snakes

Lichanura, the rosy boas, are a genus of snakes in the family Boidae. They are distributed across the southwestern United States and northwestern Mexico.

== Species ==
There are two recognized species:

- Lichanura orcutti Stejneger, 1889
- Lichanura trivirgata Cope, 1861
