= Winona Lake (Flathead County, Montana) =

Lake in Montana, United States

- Location within Montana Location within the United States
- Location: Glacier National Park, Flathead County, Montana, US
- Coordinates: 48°43′46″N 114°14′10″W
- Type: Natural
- Basin countries: United States
- Max. length: .40 mi (0.64 km)
- Max. width: .15 mi (0.24 km)
- Surface elevation: 3,492 ft (1,064 m)

Winona Lake is located in Glacier National Park, in the U. S. state of Montana. Winona Lake is 5 miles (8.0 km) west of Logging Lake.

== See also ==
- List of lakes in Flathead County, Montana (M-Z)
