= Winona Wildlife Management Area =

- IUCN category V (protected landscape/seascape)
- Location within Arkansas
- Location: Perry County, Saline County, Garland County, Arkansas
- Coordinates: 34.86741°N 92.82400°W
- Area: 145,276 acres (587.91 km^{2})
- Established: 1968
- Website: www.agfc.com/wma/winona-wma/

The Winona Wildlife Management Area (WMA) is a 145,276 acres (58,791 ha) protected area within the boundaries of the Ouachita National Forest in the Ouachita Mountains. The WMA is owned by the U. S. Forest Service and managed under the provisions of a Memorandum of Understanding by the Arkansas Game and Fish Commission, and is situated in the Ouachita Mountains. Outdoors activities including hunting, fishing, backpacking, birding, and swimming are available. The WMA also contains hiking trails, including the Ouachita National Recreation Trail, and mountain biking trails. Winona includes the Flatside Wilderness.

Winona WMA includes Lake Winona, the reservoir serving as drinking water supply for Central Arkansas Water, as well as Lake Sylvia and Bear Creek Lake. Lake Winona and associated PWA improvements are listed on the National Register of Historic Places.

== Lake Winona ==
Lake Winona
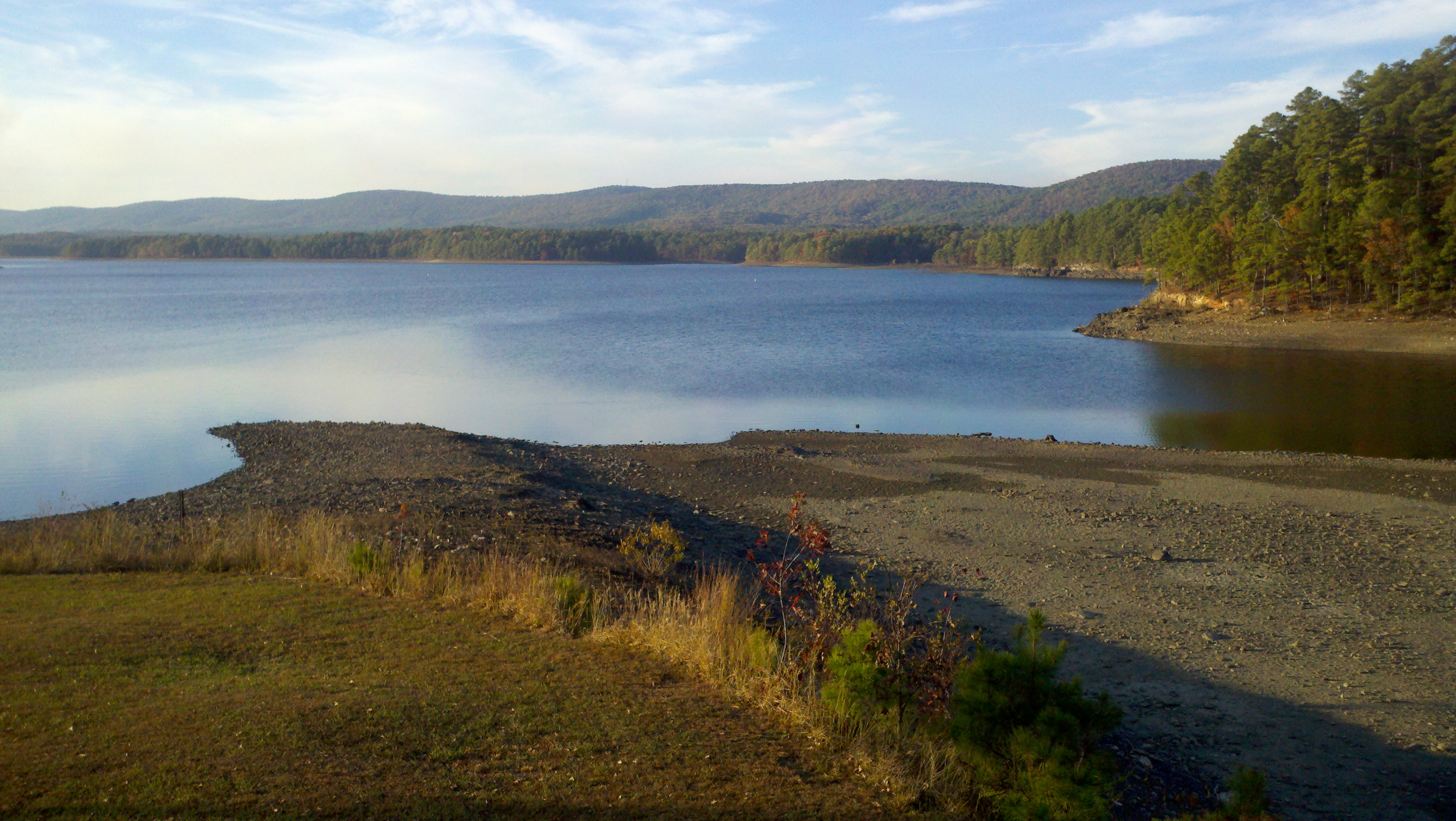

- Location within Arkansas
- Official name: Alum Fork Reservoir
- Location: Saline Arkansas, United States
- Status: Open
- Construction began: July 1936
- Opening date: May 1938
- Construction cost: $4,770,000
- Owner: United States Forest Service

Dam and spillways
- Impounds: Alum Fork
- Height: 115 feet (35 m)
- Length: 2,800 feet (850 m)
- Spillways: 1
- Spillway type: Packed earth and rock, covered with concrete

Reservoir
- Creates: Lake Winona
- Total capacity: 14 billion US gallons (5.3×10^{10} L)
- Catchment area: 43 square miles (110 km^{2})
- Surface area: 1,240 acres (500 ha)
- Alum Fork Reservoir
- Location: 24577 Lake Winona Road, Paron, Arkansas
- Area: 2,229 acres (902 ha)
- Built: 1934
- Built by: Public Works Administration
- MPS: An Ambition to be Preferred: New Deal Recovery Efforts in Arkansas 1933-1943
- NRHP reference No.: MP100013024
- Added to NRHP: May 22, 2026

Lake Winona is a reservoir of Alum Fork constructed by the Public Works Administration (PWA) in the 1930s during the New Deal. The lake is open to fishing with certain boating restrictions to ensure water quality. Swimming, camping, and ATVs are not allowed around the shoreline.

== See also ==
- List of Wildlife Management Areas in Arkansas
- White Rock Wildlife Management Area, a large Forest Service-owned WMA with reservoirs in the Ozark Mountains
