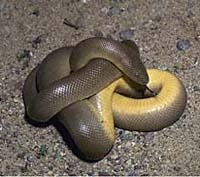
- Rubber boa, C. bottae

Scientific classification
- Kingdom: Animalia
- Phylum: Chordata
- Class: Reptilia
- Order: Squamata
- Suborder: Serpentes
- Family: Boidae
- Subfamily: Erycinae
- Genus: Charina; Gray, 1849

Synonyms
- Wenona Baird & Girard, 1852; Rhoptrura W. Peters, 1858; Lichanura Cope, 1861; Pseudoeryx Jan, 1862 non Fitzinger, 1826

= Charina =

Genus of snakes

Charina is a genus of boa, commonly known as rubber boas, found in North America. Two species are currently recognized.

== Distribution and habitat ==
Found in North America from western Canada south through the western United States into northwestern Mexico.

== Species ==
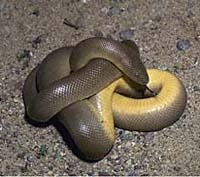
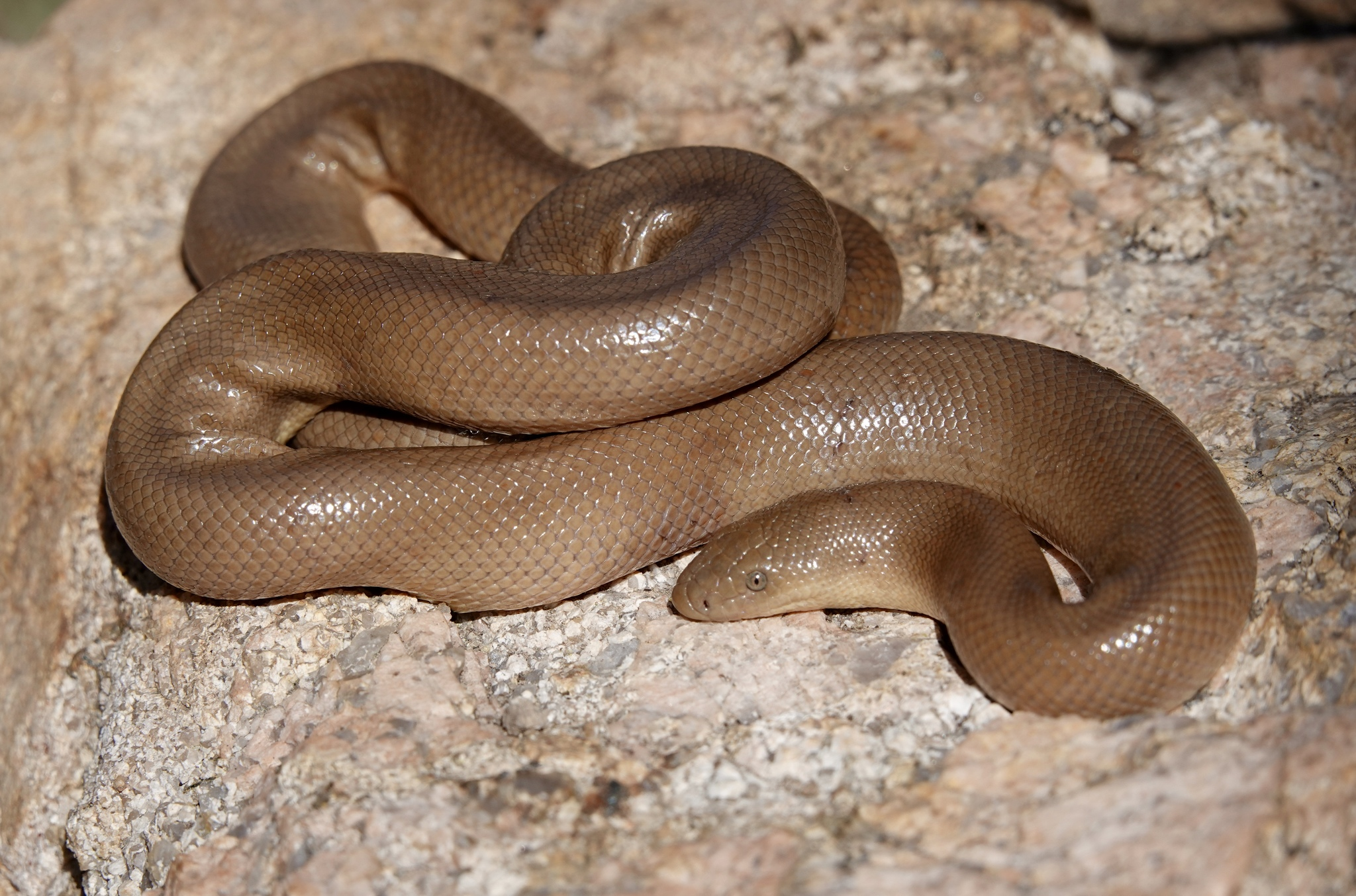
Species	Taxon author	Subsp.*	Common name	Geographic range
C. bottae^{T}	(Blainville, 1835)	0	Northern rubber boa	Western Canada in southeastern British Columbia. The northwestern and western United States in most of Washington, Oregon, Idaho, western Montana and Wyoming, northern and central Utah, and as far south as northern Nevada and Monterey County, California.
C. umbratica	Klauber, 1943	0	Southern rubber boa	The United States in southern California (Riverside and San Bernardino Counties).

- ) Not including the nominate subspecies.

^{T}) Type species.

== Taxonomy ==
Sources vary on how many species the genus contains. Some consider the rubber boa, C. bottae, to be the sole member of the genus. In addition, some experts consider the southern rubber boa, C. umbratica to be a subspecies of C. bottae. Although the Calabar python, Calabaria reinhardtii has been included in Charina, recent phylogenetic analyses based on DNA have shown that it does not belong to this genus.
