= List of erycine species and subspecies =

This is a list of all extant genera, species and subspecies of the snakes of the subfamily Erycinae, otherwise referred to as erycines or Old World sand boas. It follows the taxonomy currently provided by ITIS, which is based on the continuing work of Roy McDiarmid.

- Charina, rubber boas
  - Charina bottae, northern rubber boa or coastal rubber boa
  - Charina umbratica, southern rubber boa
- Eryx, Old World sand boas sensu stricto
  - Eryx borrii, Borri's sand boa
  - Eryx colubrinus, Egyptian sand boa or Kenyan sand boa
    - Eryx colubrinus colubrinus
    - Eryx colubrinus loveridgei
    - Eryx colubrinus rufescens
  - Eryx conicus, Russell's boa, rough-scaled sand boa or rough-tailed sand boa
  - Eryx elegans, Central Asian sand boa
  - Eryx jaculus, javelin sand boa
  - Eryx jayakari, Arabian sand boa or Jayakar's sand boa
  - Eryx johnii, Indian sand boa
  - Eryx miliaris, dwarf sand boa, desert sand boa or Tartar sand boa
  - Eryx muelleri, Müller's sand boa or Sahara sand boa
    - Eryx muelleri muelleri
    - Eryx muelleri subniger
  - Eryx sistanensis, Sistan sand boa
  - Eryx somalicus, Somali sand boa
  - Eryx vittatus
  - Eryx whitakeri, Whitaker's sand boa or Whitaker's boa
- Lichanura, rosy boas
  - Lichanura orcutti, coastal rosy boa or northern three-lined boa
  - Lichanura trivirgata, desert rosy boa
    - Lichanura trivirgata arizonae, Arizona rosy boa
    - Lichanura trivirgata gracia, desert rosy boa
    - Lichanura trivirgata saslowi, Baja rosy boa
    - Lichanura trivirgata trivirgata, Mexican rosy boa

== See also ==
- List of boine species and subspecies
