= Annamaria Nistri =

Italian herpetologist and museum curator

- Born: 16 September 1960 (age 66); Florence, Italy
- Education: University of Florence
- Known for: Research on Italian and African amphibians and reptiles; description of Aprosdoketophis andreonei, Eryx borrii, and Hemidactylus gubanensis
- Scientific career
- Fields: Herpetology
- Workplaces: University of Florence

Annamaria Nistri (born 16 September 1960) is an Italian herpetologist and museum curator. She is associated with the Natural History Museum of Florence, University of Florence, where she has worked since 1990 and is responsible for the museum's La Specola sector and its amphibian and reptile collections.

== Biography ==
Nistri was born in Florence, Italy, in 1960. She graduated in biological sciences in 1985. In 1990 she began working as a curator in the Zoological Section of the Natural History Museum of the University of Florence, La Specola. She initially worked with the museum's ornithological collection and, from 2007, concentrated on its herpetological collection.

Her research has focused on the fauna of Italy and Africa, particularly amphibians and reptiles. According to her University of Florence profile, her work includes research in the systematics and faunistics of amphibians and reptiles, with particular attention to Tuscan species and species from the Horn of Africa. She has authored more than 100 publications and has participated in study and collecting expeditions and projects concerned principally with the conservation of Tuscan fauna.

Nistri has also worked extensively on the zoological collections of La Specola. The University of Florence lists her as the head of the amphibian and reptile collections, while Annamaria Nocita is listed as the head of the fish collection. Both Nistri and Nocita are identified as members of the Natural History Museum "La Specola" of the University of Florence in a 2025 article in Marine Mammal Science.

Nistri has collaborated with other zoologists on the description of new reptile taxa. With Benedetto Lanza she described the Somali sand boa Eryx borrii in 2005. The species is recognized as valid and is endemic to Somalia.

In 2010, Nistri, Lanza and Van Wallach described the snake genus Aprosdoketophis and its type species Aprosdoketophis andreonei from Somalia. The species was described in the African Journal of Herpetology and is endemic to Somalia.

Nistri has published works on the herpetofauna of Tuscany, including Biodiversità in provincia di Prato. Vol. 1: Anfibi e rettili with Elisabetta Fancelli and Stefano Vanni in 2005. With Vanni, she published Atlante degli anfibi e dei rettili della Toscana in 2006, a survey produced through collaboration between the Region of Tuscany and the Zoological Section of La Specola. She also co-authored Iconografia degli anfibi d'Italia with Benedetto Lanza and Stefano Vanni in 2007.

In 2024, Nistri was one of the authors of the description of the Guban gecko, Hemidactylus gubanensis, a new species from the coastal areas of northern Somaliland. The species was described by Tomáš Mazuch, Vojtěch Janák, Doubravka Velenská, Nistri, Hassan Sh Abdirahman Elmi and Jiří Šmíd in African Zoology. The study found two previously undescribed Hemidactylus species in northern Somaliland and identified the Guban coastal plain as an area of significant biodiversity.

The discovery of H. gubanensis received international media coverage. A Miami Herald report described the species as a small, spiny gecko discovered during wildlife surveys in Somaliland and identified Nistri as one of the members of the research team. The report stated that the species had been found at multiple locations in Somaliland and was named after the Guban region.

== Selected publications ==
- Nistri, Annamaria; Fancelli, Elisabetta; Vanni, Stefano (2005). Biodiversità in provincia di Prato. Vol. 1: Anfibi e rettili. Le Balze.
- Vanni, Stefano; Nistri, Annamaria (2006). Atlante degli anfibi e dei rettili della Toscana. Regione Toscana.
- Lanza, Benedetto; Nistri, Annamaria (2005). "Somali Boidae (genus Eryx Daudin 1803) and Pythonidae (genus Python Daudin 1803) (Reptilia Serpentes)". Tropical Zoology. 18: 67–136.
- Lanza, Benedetto; Nistri, Annamaria; Vanni, Stefano (2007). Iconografia degli anfibi d'Italia.
- Wallach, Van; Lanza, Benedetto; Nistri, Annamaria (2010). "Aprosdoketophis andreonei, a new genus and species of snake from Somalia (Serpentes: Colubridae: Boiginae)". African Journal of Herpetology. 59 (2): 95–110.
- Nistri, Annamaria (2010). "The herpetology collection of the zoology section 'La Specola' of the Museo di Storia Naturale dell'Università di Firenze". Museologia Scientifica Memorie. 5: 118–128.
- Mazuch, Tomáš; Janák, Vojtěch; Velenská, Doubravka; Nistri, Annamaria; Elmi, Hassan Sh Abdirahman; Šmíd, Jiří (2024). "Two new species of Hemidactylus Goldfuss, 1820 (Squamata: Gekkonidae) from the coastal areas of northern Somaliland". African Zoology. 59 (2): 77–100.
