= Erycinidae =

Erycinidae is a taxonomic synonym that may refer to:

- The Riodinidae, a family of butterflies
- The Erycinae, a subfamily of boid snakes
