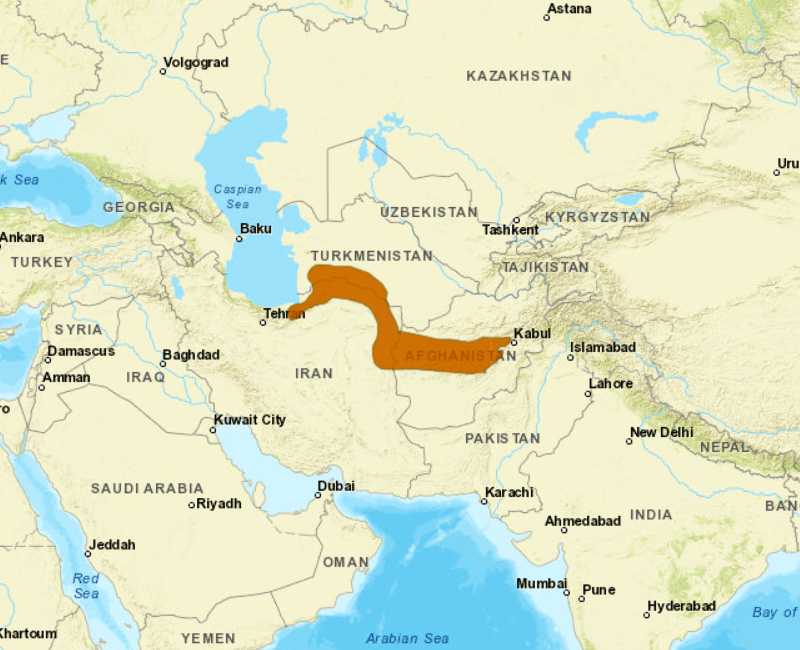
- Map of the distribution of Eryx elegans

Conservation status
- Least Concern (IUCN 3.1)

Scientific classification
- Kingdom: Animalia
- Phylum: Chordata
- Class: Reptilia
- Order: Squamata
- Suborder: Serpentes
- Family: Boidae
- Genus: Eryx
- Species: E. elegans

Binomial name
- Eryx elegans (Gray, 1849)

Synonyms
- Cusoria elegans Gray, 1849; Cursoria elegans — Günther, 1864; Eryx elegans — Blanford, 1876; Eryx elegans — Boulenger, 1893; Eryx jaculus czarewskii Nikolski, 1916; Eryx elegans — Stimson, 1969

= Eryx elegans =

Species of snake

Eryx elegans (Central Asian sand boa, elegant sand boa) is a boa species endemic to western Central Asia. Like all other boas, it is not venomous. No subspecies are recognized.

== Description ==
Not well-known in the wild or in captivity, this is a small species, reaching about 15 inches (38 cm) in total length (including tail). The dorsal scales are small and slightly keeled. Coloration is very drab, consisting of a light olive-brown background, with small, irregular, darker brown blotches with black edges running along the back. There are also brown blotches on the ventral surface.

== Geographic range ==
Eryx elegans is found in southern Turkmenistan, northern Iran (the Kopet Dag mountains in the north-east and the Azerbaijan region in the north-west), and Afghanistan. The type locality given is "Afghanistan."
