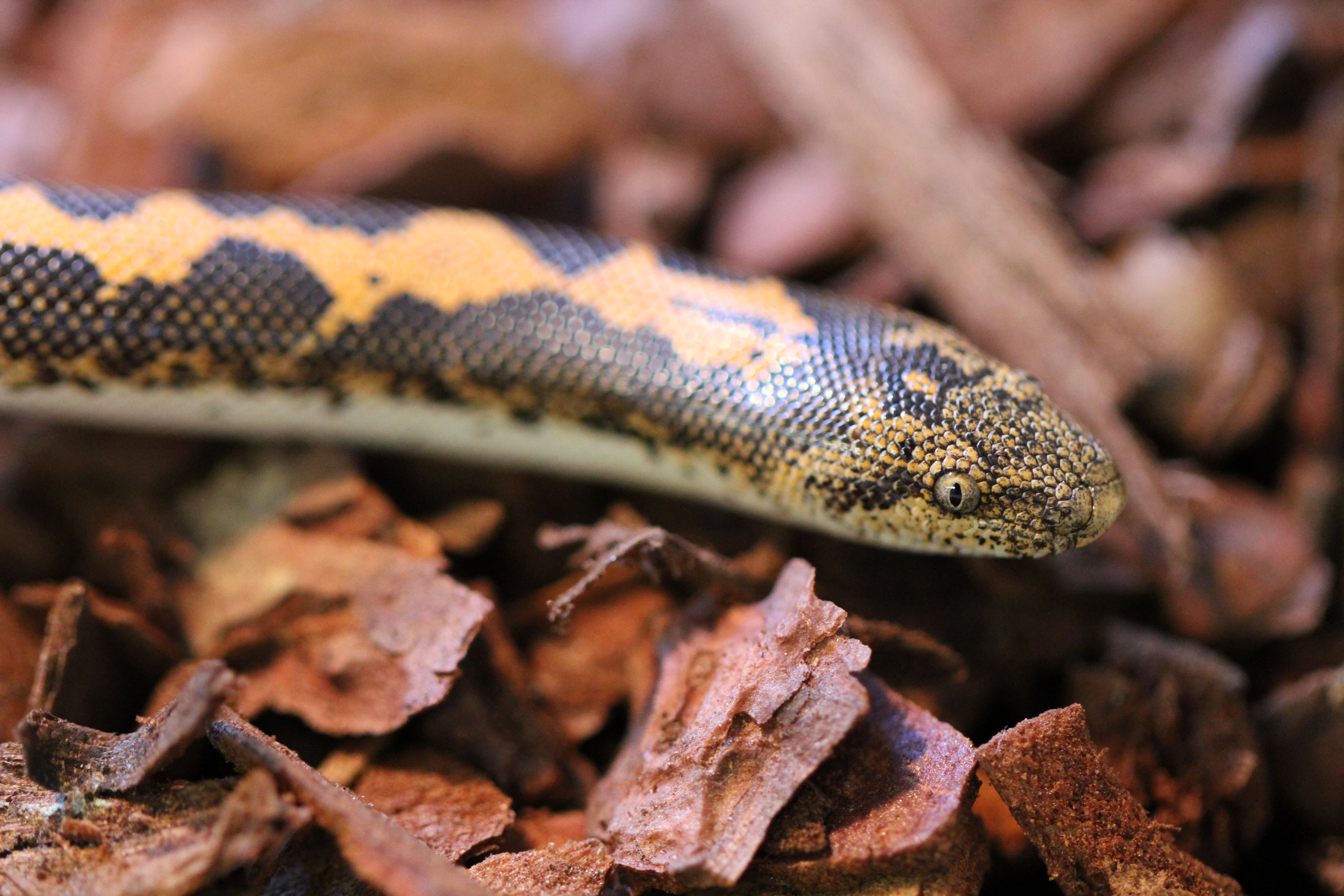

Conservation status
- Least Concern (IUCN 3.1)

Scientific classification
- Kingdom: Animalia
- Phylum: Chordata
- Class: Reptilia
- Order: Squamata
- Suborder: Serpentes
- Family: Boidae
- Genus: Eryx
- Species: E. colubrinus

Binomial name
- Eryx colubrinus (Linnaeus, 1758)

Synonyms
- [Anguis] colubrina Linnaeus, 1758; Eryx colubrinus — Daudin, 1803; Eryx thebaicus Reuss, 1834; Eryx scutata Gray, 1842; E[ryx]. jaculus var. sennaariensis Jan, 1863; Eryx jaculus var. sennaariensis — Jan & Sordelli, 1864; Eryx thebaicus — Boulenger, 1893; E[ryx]. t[hebaicus]. thebaicus — Stull, 1932; Eryx thebaicus loveridgei Stull, 1932; Eryx colubrina — Flower, 1933; Eryx rufescens Ahl, 1933; Eryx colubrinus colubrinus — Stull, 1935; Eryx colubrinus loveridgei — Stull, 1935; Gongylophis (Neogonglyophis) colubrinus — Tokar, 1989

= Eryx colubrinus =

Species of snake

Eryx colubrinus, also known as the Kenyan sand boa and several other common names, is a species of snake in the subfamily Erycinae of the family Boidae. The species is native to northern and eastern Africa. Three subspecies are recognized.

== Description ==
Eryx colubrinus is a heavily-built snake with a small head, small eyes, vertical pupils, and a short tail. Scale texture is extremely smooth, except on the tail, which tapers off into a keeled scale pattern. Adult female specimens of G. colubrinus are rarely more than 91 cm (3 feet) in total length (tail included). The average Egyptian sand boa grows no longer than 12-32" (30-80cm) long, with males being significantly smaller than females.

The color pattern usually consists of a yellow or orange coloration overlaid with dark brown splotches. The belly is white or cream-colored. E. colubrinus is readily available in the pet trade due to its small size, docility and ease of care. In recent years, there have been a number of new color morphs made available by both commercial and hobby breeders. Some of the more popular morphs available include anerythristic (black and white lacking orange/red simple recessive trait), albino (lacking black pigment simple recessive trait), snow (double recessive combination of an anerythristic and an albino), stripes (normal-colored, anerythristic, albino and snow), hypo/ghost, paradox albinos (simple recessive trait), paradox snows (double recessive trait), splash (recessive trait), paint (recessive trait) and stripe combinations with any of the listed recessive traits. In addition, many line bred traits have been accentuated on the above morphs, such as Nuclears (extreme red), High Whites and Reduced Patterns, for example.

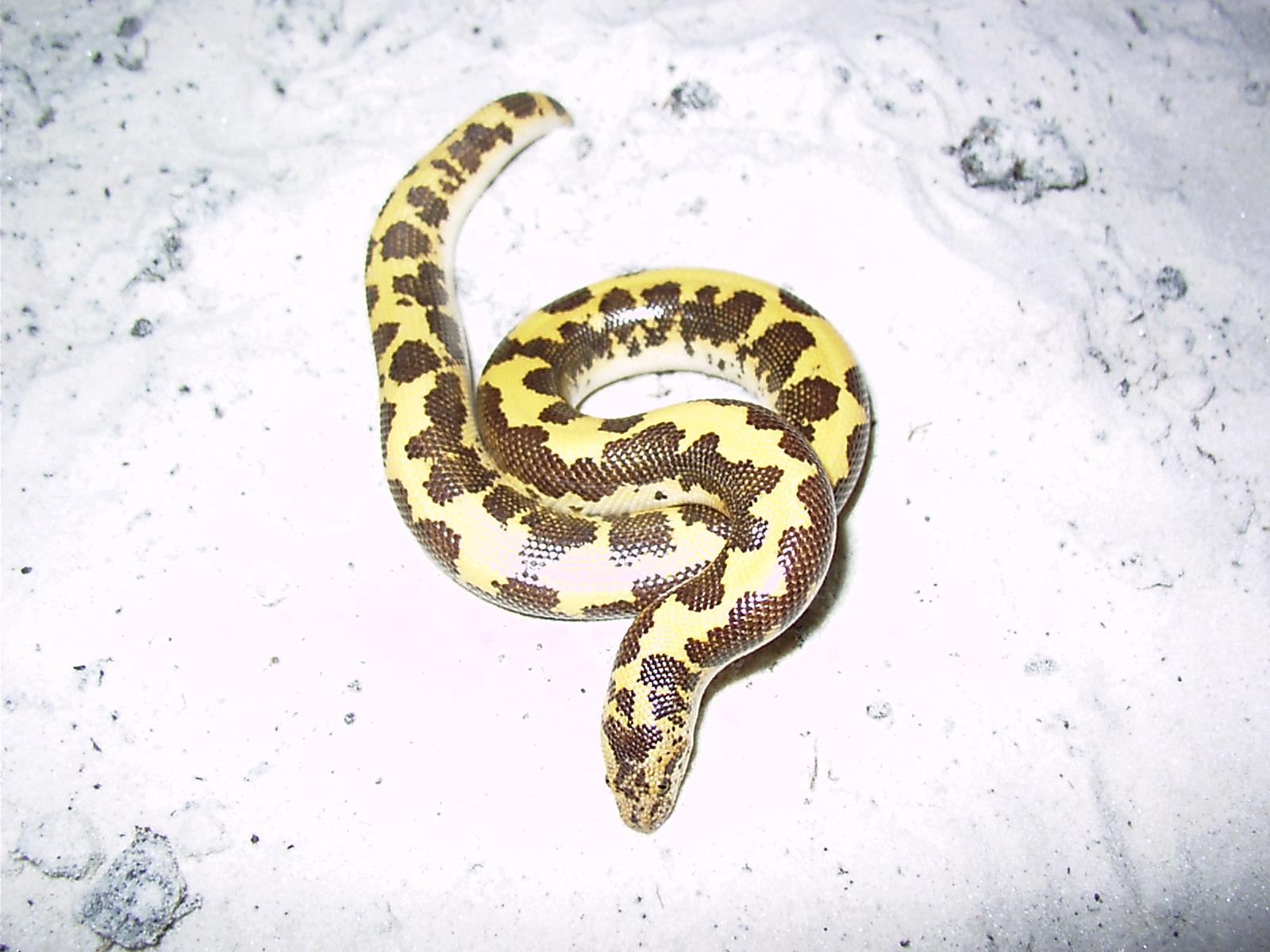
loveridgei subspecies "normal" morph

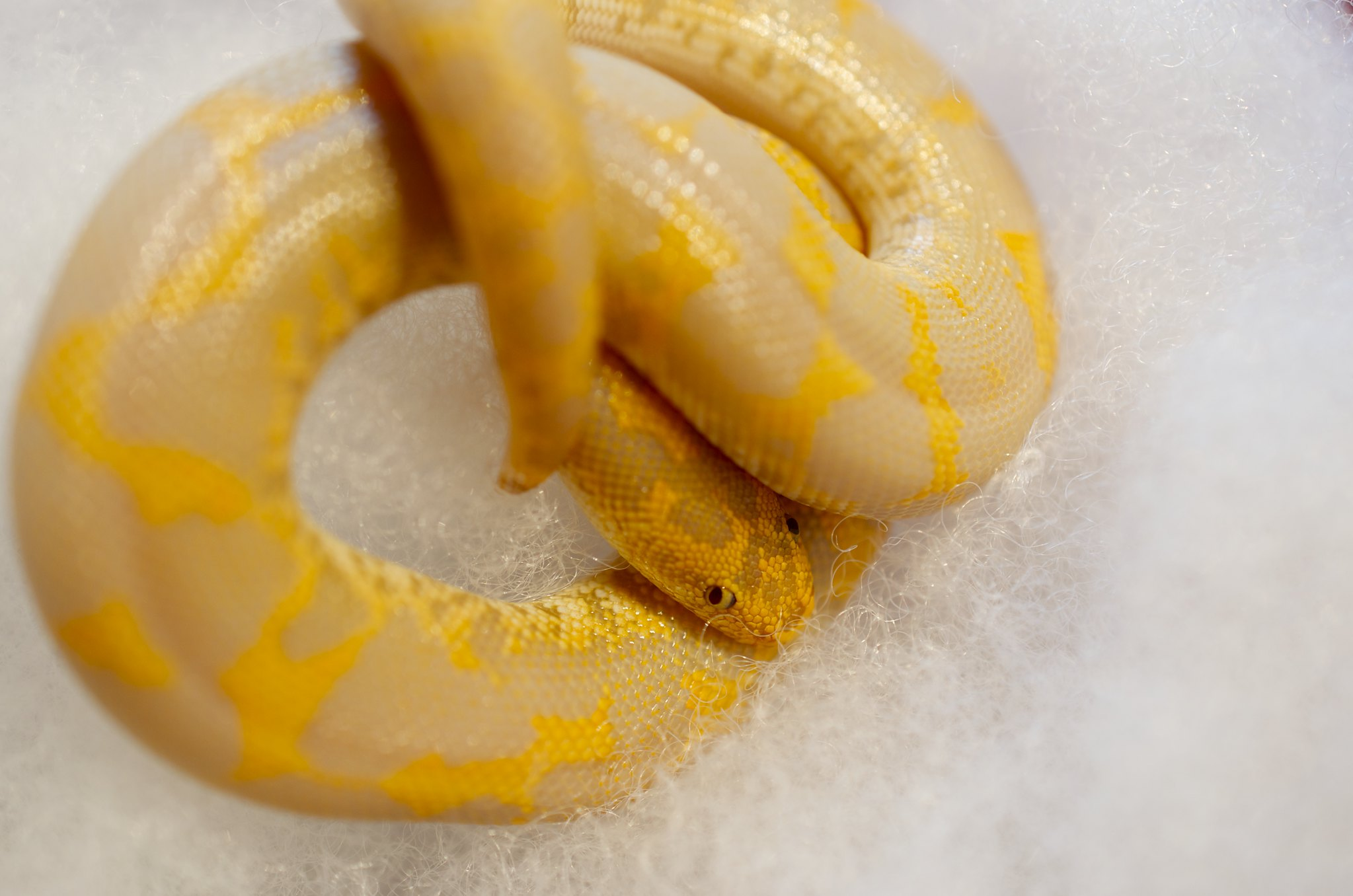
Albino morph

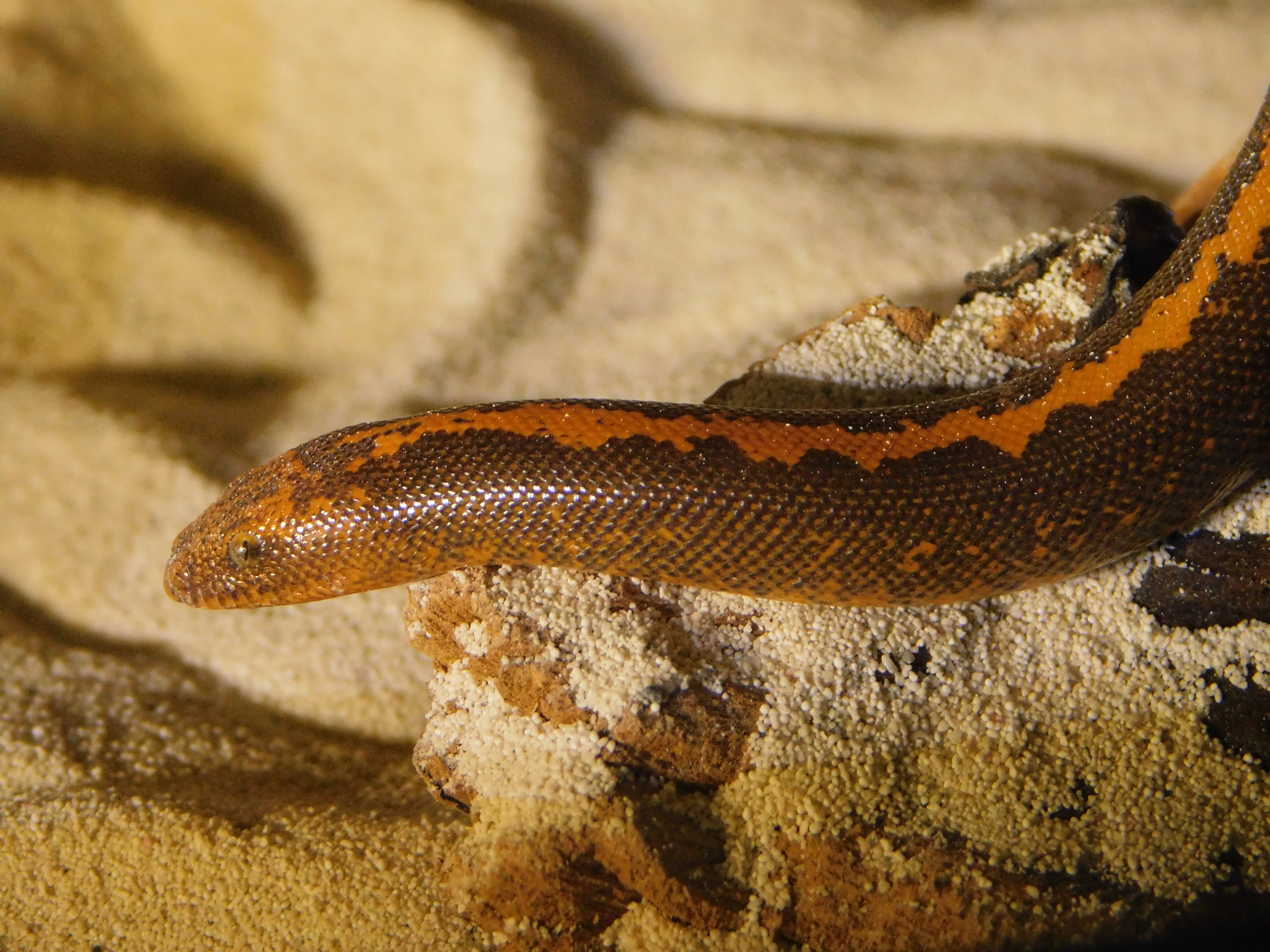
Stripe morph

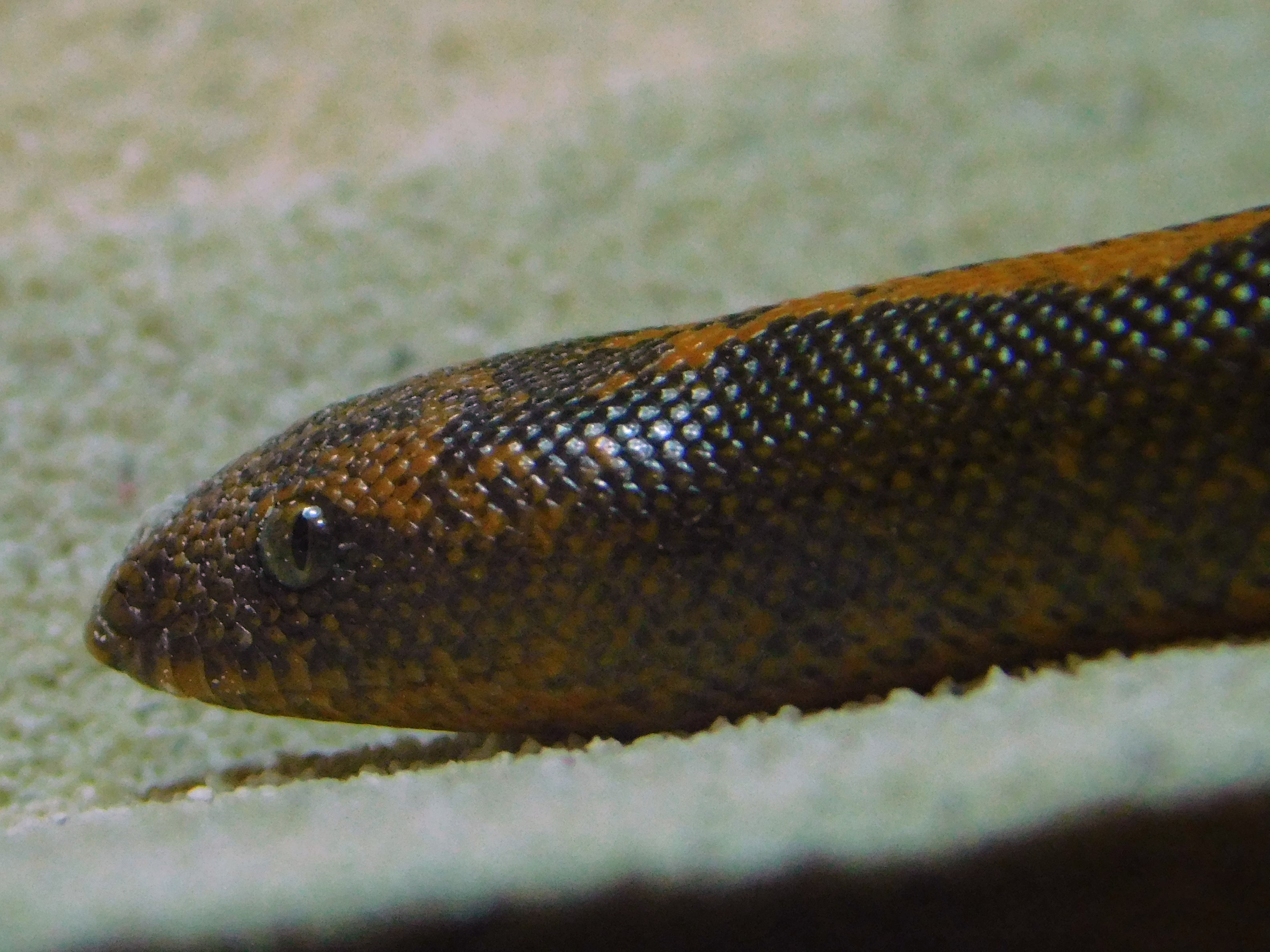
Lateral view of a stripe morph showing the specialized head shape for burrowing

== Common names ==
Common names for Eryx colubrinus include East African sand boa, Egyptian sand boa, Kenya sand boa, Kenyan sand boa, and sand boa.

== Geographic range ==
Eryx colubrinus is found in North Africa from Egypt as far west as Niger (Aïr), including Somalia, Ethiopia, Sudan, Kenya, and northern Tanzania. A single specimen has been reported from Yemen. The type locality given is "Ægypto".

== Habitat ==
Eryx colubrinus occurs in semi-desert and scrub savannahs and rock outcroppings. It prefers sandy, friable soil.

== Behavior ==
Eryx colubrinus is most active at night, but may be irregularly active during the day. This species is fossorial and spends roughly 80% of its time underground. During the hotter times of the year, E. colubrinus seeks refuge beneath stones and in the burrows of small mammals. However, they have also been known to occasionally climb trees.

== Diet ==
Eryx colubrinus feeds on small mammals (such as rodents), lizards and birds. They are ambush predators, meaning they hide under the sand and wait for prey to be within striking range and are killed by constriction. Occasionally, they have been known to hunt out the nests of small mammals and birds.

== Reproduction ==
Eryx colubrinus is ovoviviparous. In captivity, it breeds readily November through April in the United States, delivering live birth averaging 10-20 babies born spring through late summer. The young at birth typically are 20–25 cm (8-10 inches) in length.

== Taxonomy ==
A synonym for this species, Eryx colubrinus, is Anguis colubrina, given by Linnaeus.

Stimson (1969) recognized two subspecies: Eryx colubrinus colubrinus Linnaeus and E. c. loveridgei Stull, but mentioned that a number of other authors, including Ahl (1933), Loveridge (1936), Scortecci (1939), and Parker (1949), questioned whether E. c. loveridgei was valid and considered the species to be monotypic with geographic variation.

When recognized, Eryx colubrinus loveridgei is said to occur in the southern part of the range and is described as being more orange in color.

A third subspecies, Eryx colubrinus rufescens, is smaller and more rounded than E. c. loveridgei, with rougher scales.

Shi et al. (2023) proposed that E. colubrinus was the sister species to the Miocene fossil species E. linxiaensis from Gansu, China. This suggests repeat dispersal events of the genus from Africa to Eurasia during the Miocene.

== Etymology ==
The subspecific name loveridgei is in honor of British herpetologist Arthur Loveridge.
