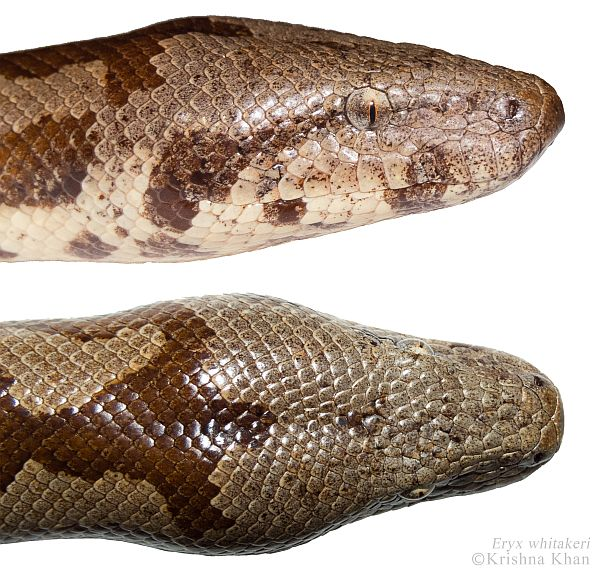
- Lateral and dorsal headviews of adult Eryx whitakeri

Conservation status
- Near Threatened (IUCN 3.1)

Scientific classification
- Kingdom: Animalia
- Phylum: Chordata
- Class: Reptilia
- Order: Squamata
- Suborder: Serpentes
- Family: Boidae
- Genus: Eryx
- Species: E. whitakeri

Binomial name
- Eryx whitakeri Das, 1991

Synonyms
- Eryx whitakeri Das, 1991; Gongylophis whitakeri — Tokar, 1995; Eryx whitakeri — McDiarmid, Campbell & Touré, 1999

= Eryx whitakeri =

Species of snake

Eryx whitakeri, also commonly known as Whitaker's sand boa or Whitaker's boa, is a species of nonvenomous snake in the subfamily Erycinae of the family Boidae. The species is endemic to India. No subspecies are recognized.

== Etymology ==
The specific name whitakeri, as well as both of the above common names, are in honor of American-born Indian herpetologist Romulus Whitaker.

== Geographic range ==
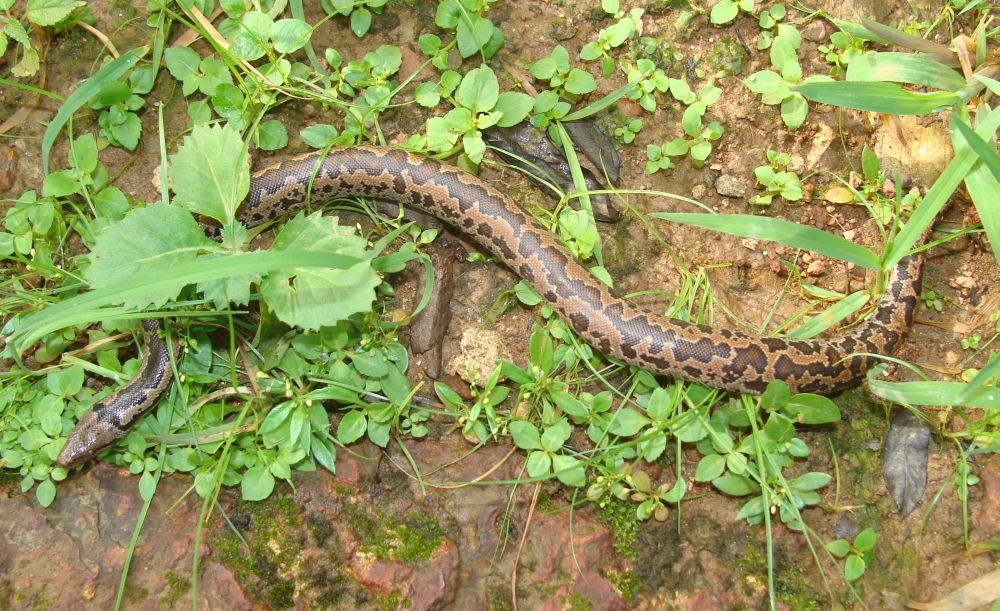
A juvenile Whitaker's sand boa in Pilerne, Goa (top view)

An adult Whitaker's sand boa in Pilerne, Goa

E. whitakeri is found in southwestern coastal India in the states of Kerala, Karnataka, Goa, and southern Maharashtra.

The type locality given is "Mangalore, Karnataka State, India".

== Habitat ==
The preferred natural habitats of E. whitakeri are sea beaches and scrub forests.

== Description ==
E. whitakeri may attain a snout-to-vent length (SVL) of 79 cm (31 in).

== Diet ==
E. whitaker preys upon small mice.

== Reproduction ==
E. whitakeri is viviparous.
