= Eryx borrii =

Conservation status
- Data Deficient (IUCN 3.1)

Scientific classification
- Kingdom: Animalia
- Phylum: Chordata
- Class: Reptilia
- Order: Squamata
- Suborder: Serpentes
- Family: Boidae
- Genus: Eryx
- Species: E. borrii

Binomial name
- Eryx borrii Lanza & Nistri, 2005

Species of snake

Eryx borrii is a species of snake in the family Boidae. The species is endemic to Somalia.

== Etymology ==
The specific name, borrii, is in honor of Italian zoologist Marco Borri.

== Geographic range ==
E. borrii is found in northern Somalia.

== Habitat ==
The preferred natural habitat of E. borrii is shrubland, at altitudes around 400 m (1,300 ft).

== Description ==
E. borrii is similar in morphology to E. somalicus. However, E. borri is more slender and has a higher number of ventral scales (193 as opposed to 163 in E. somalicus).

== Behavior ==
E. borrii is terrestrial, semi-fossorial, crepuscular and nocturnal.

== Reproduction ==
E. borrii is ovoviviparous.
