= African Journal of Herpetology =

- Discipline: Herpetology
- Language: English
- Edited by: Ché Weldon

Publication details
- Former name(s): The Journal of the Herpetological Association of Africa; Journal of the Herpetological Association of Rhodesia
- History: 1957-present
- Publisher: Taylor & Francis
- Frequency: Biannual
- Impact factor: 0.429 (2018)

Standard abbreviations
- ISO 4: Afr. J. Herpetol.

Indexing
- ISSN: 2156-4574 (print); 2153-3660 (web)
- LCCN: 2010200283
- OCLC no.: 741254297

Links
- Journal homepage; Online access; Online archive

The African Journal of Herpetology is a biannual peer-reviewed scientific journal published by Taylor & Francis on behalf of the Herpetological Association of Africa. It covers research on any aspects of African reptiles and amphibians. According to the Journal Citation Reports, the journal has a 2018 impact factor of 0.429.

== Types of papers published ==
The journal publishes the following types of papers:

- Original articles
- Short communications
- Reviews
