= Eryx sistanensis =

Scientific classification
- Kingdom: Animalia
- Phylum: Chordata
- Class: Reptilia
- Order: Squamata
- Suborder: Serpentes
- Family: Boidae
- Genus: Eryx
- Species: E. sistanensis

Binomial name
- Eryx sistanensis Eskandarzadeh, N. Rastegar-Pouyani, E. Rastegar-Pouyani, Zargan, Hajinourmohamadi, Nazarov, Sami, Rajabizadeh, Nabizadeh, & Navaian, 2020

Species of snake

Eryx sistanensis is a species of snake in the family Boidae. The species is described from Iran, and recorded from Pakistan and Rajasthan, India.
