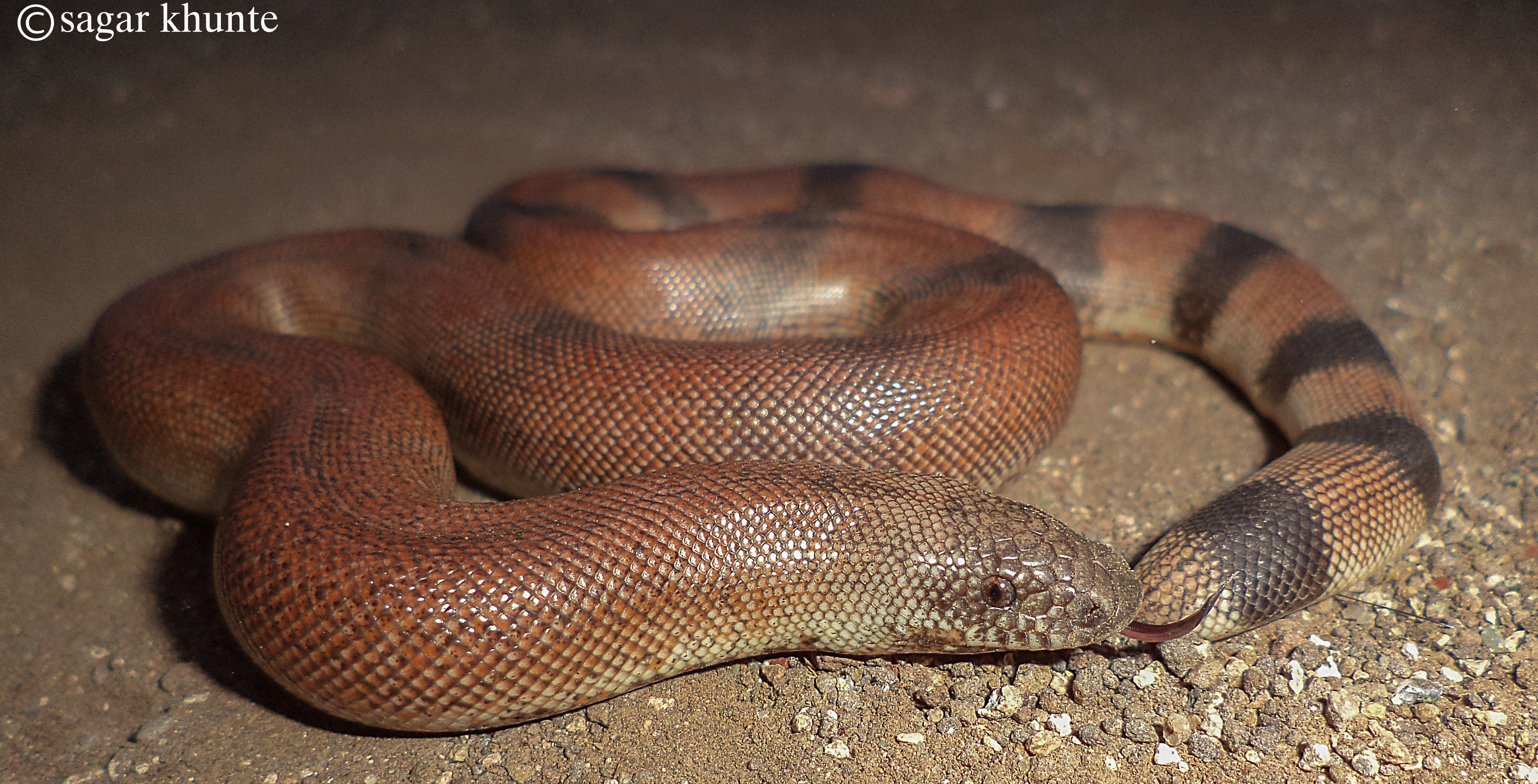

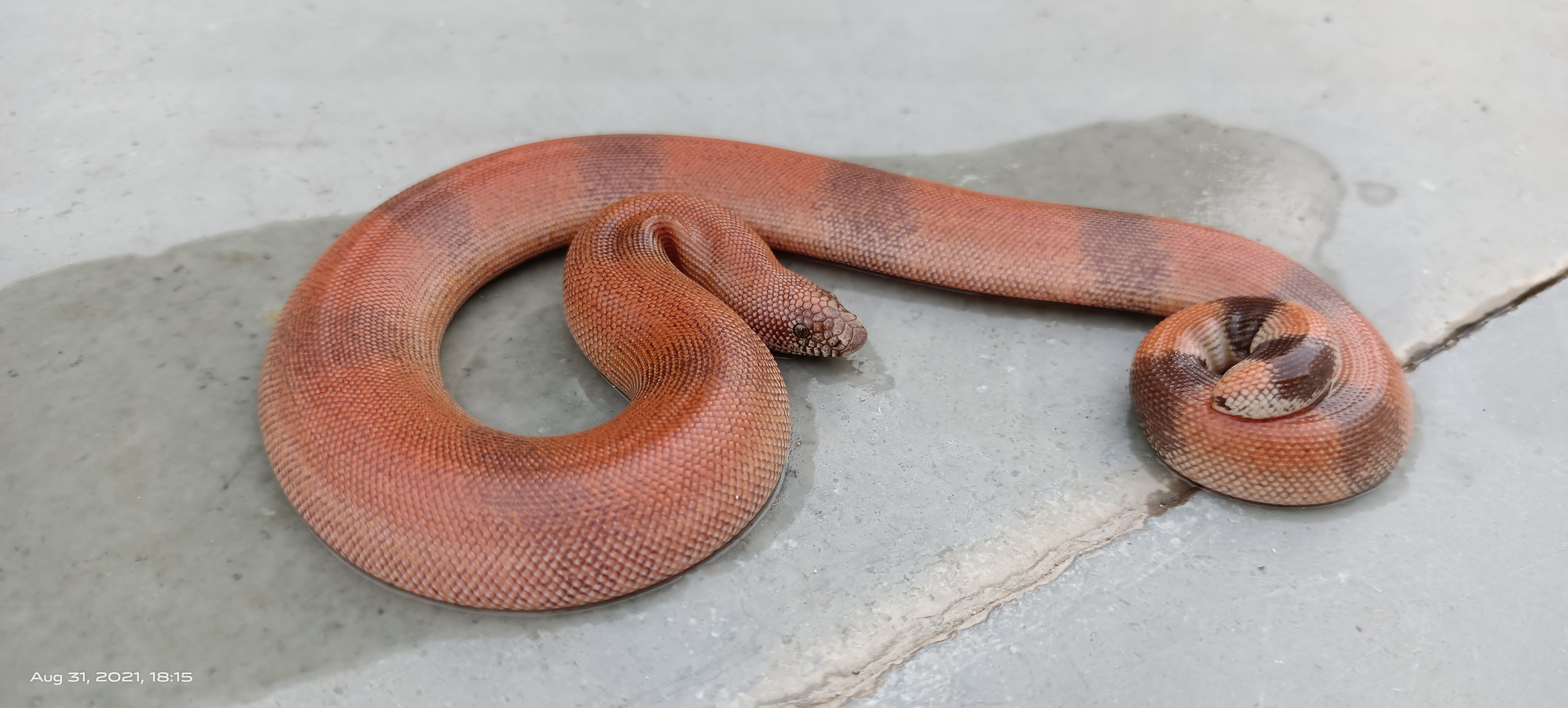
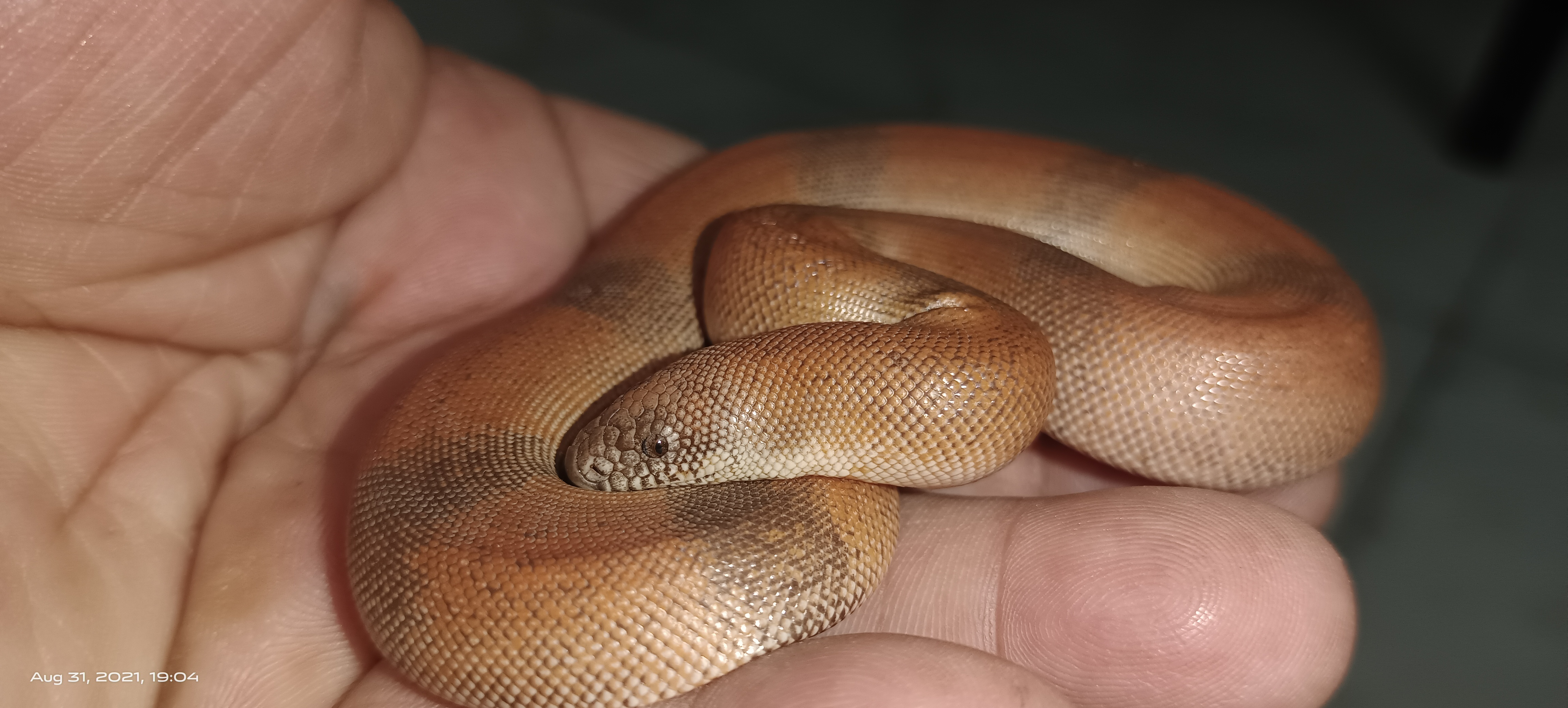
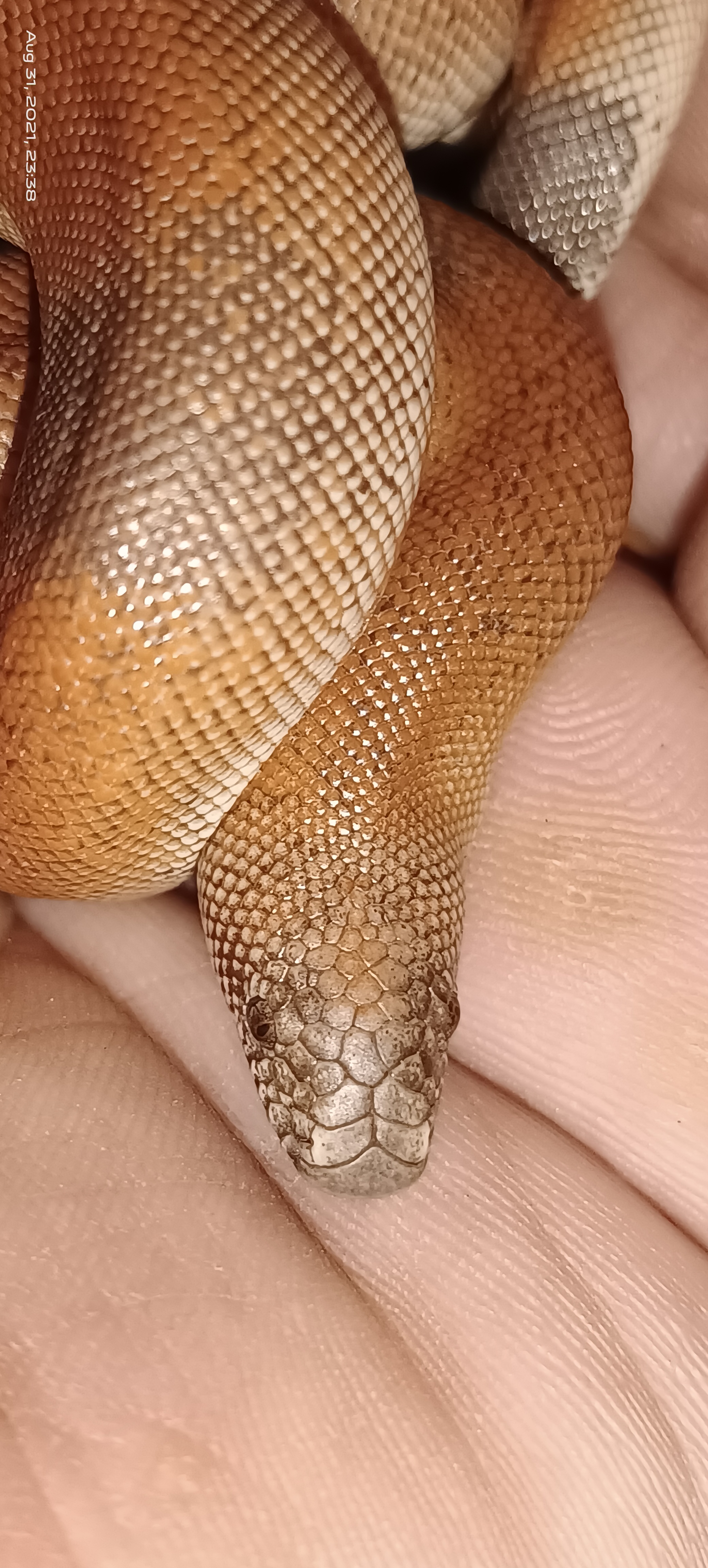
- Eryx johnii at Satara, Maharashtra, India Eryx johnii (juvenile) at Chittorgarh, Rajasthan, India Eryx johnii (juvenile) at Chittorgarh, Rajasthan, India Dorsal view of juvenile Eryx johnii

Conservation status
- Near Threatened (IUCN 3.1)

Scientific classification
- Kingdom: Animalia
- Phylum: Chordata
- Class: Reptilia
- Order: Squamata
- Suborder: Serpentes
- Family: Boidae
- Genus: Eryx
- Species: E. johnii

Binomial name
- Eryx johnii (Russell, 1801)

Synonyms
- Boa Johnii Russell, 1801; [Boa] Anguiformis Schneider, 1801; Clothonia anguiformis — Daudin, 1803; [Tortrix] eryx indicus Schlegel, 1837; Clothonia Johnii — Gray, 1842; Eryx Johnii — A.M.C Duméril & Bibron, 1844; Eryx maculatus Hallowell, 1849; Eryx johnii — Boulenger, 1890; Eryx jaculus var. johnii — Ingoldby, 1923; Eryx johnii johnii — Stull, 1935; [Eryx] johnii — Kluge, 1993

= Eryx johnii =

Species of snake

Eryx johnii is a species of nonvenomous snake in the subfamily Erycinae of the family Boidae. The species is native to Iran, Pakistan, and India. There are no subspecies which are recognized as being valid. Common names include: Indian sand boa, John's sand boa, iruthalai nagam, mannuli pambu, red sand boa, and brown sand boa.

== Etymology ==
The specific name, johnii, is in honor of German naturalist Christoph Samuel John (1747–1813), who was a missionary in India from 1771 until his death.

== Description ==
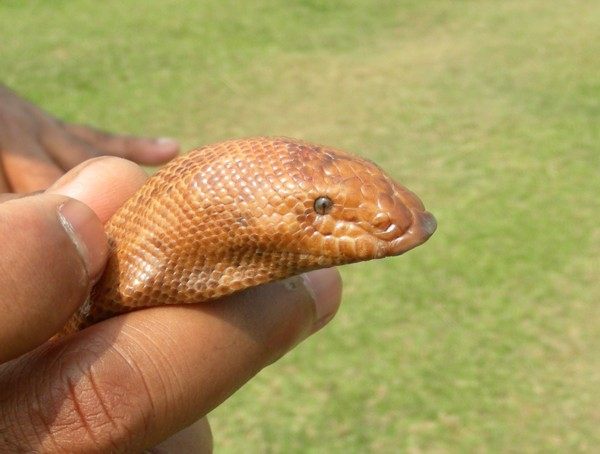
Eryx johnii, closeup of head

Adults of E. johnii rarely exceed 2 feet (61 cm) in total length (including tail), although they sometimes reach 3 feet (91 cm). Adapted to burrowing, the head is wedge-shaped with narrow nostrils and very small eyes. The body is cylindrical in shape with small polished dorsal scales. The tail, which is blunt, rounded, and not distinct from the body, appears truncated. Coloration varies from reddish brown to dull yellow-tan.

== Geographic range ==
E. johnii is found from Iran through Pakistan into western, southern, and northwestern India. The type locality given is "Tranquebar" (Tanjore, Trichy, southeastern Tamil Nadu, India). It is found in Indian desert. In western India, specifically in the state of Maharashtra, it is known as a Mandul snake (Marathi: मांडूळ साप).

== Habitat ==
E. johnii is found in dry, semi-desert scrub plains and rocky dry foothills up to 200 m (660 ft) elevation. It prefers loose sand, or sandy soil that crumbles easily, into which it burrows, living underground.

== Diet ==
The diet of E. johnii consists mainly of mammals such as rats, mice, and other small rodents that are killed by constriction. Some specimens have apparently fed exclusively on other snakes.

== Behavior ==
E. johnii is a very calm snake species.

== Reproduction ==
E. johnii is ovoviviparous, with females giving birth to up to 14 young at a time in late summer to monsoon.

== Illegal trade ==
E. johnii has many superstitious beliefs attributed to it because of its double-headed appearance, such as bringing good luck, curing AIDS, etc. Such blind faith has resulted in endangering the species, and in illegal trade in India, despite being a protected species under Schedule IV of Wildlife Protection Act, 1972, of India. It is also banned in India as pets.
