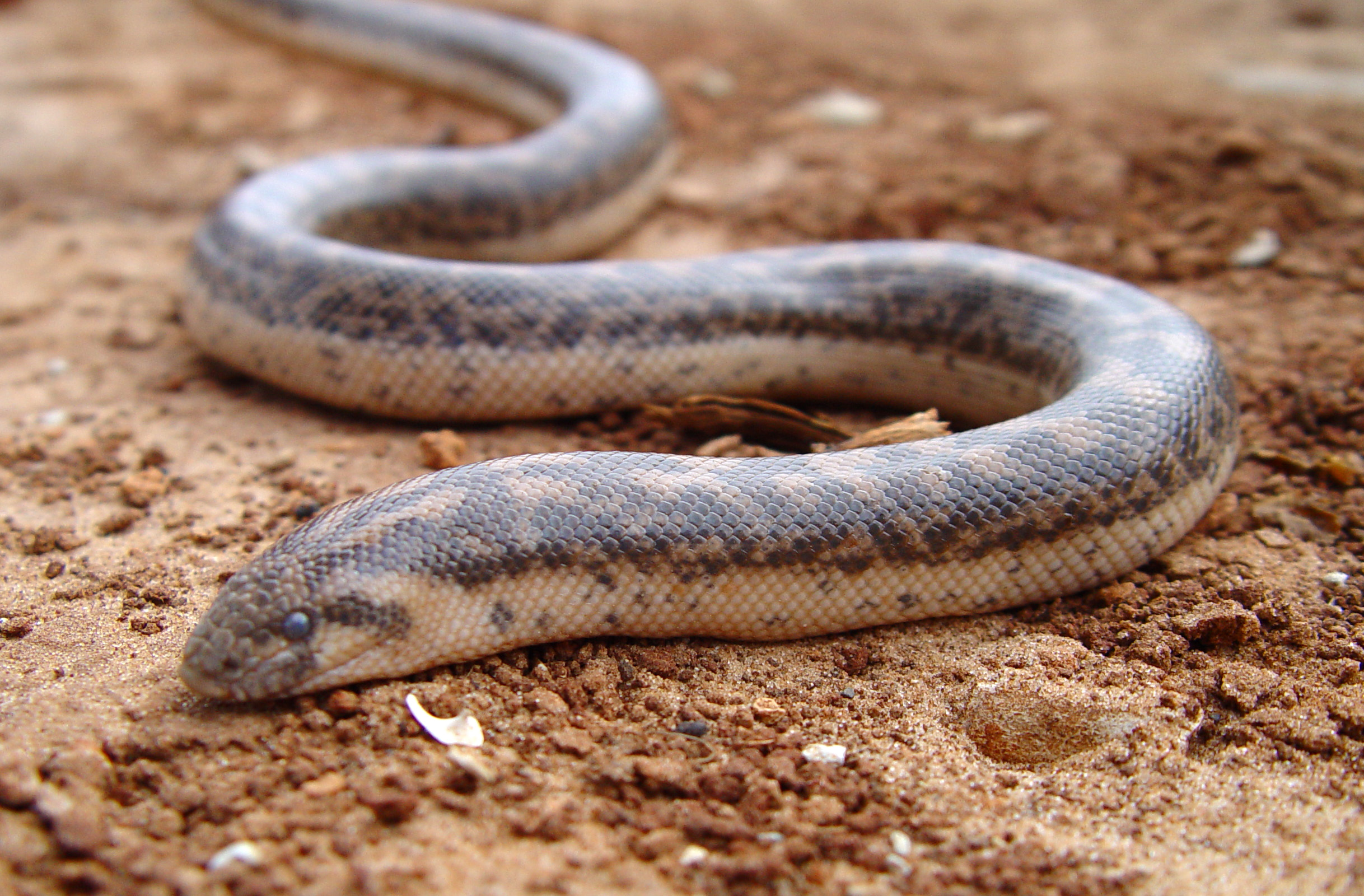
- Javelin sand boa, E. jaculus

Scientific classification
- Kingdom: Animalia
- Phylum: Chordata
- Class: Reptilia
- Order: Squamata
- Suborder: Serpentes
- Family: Boidae
- Subfamily: Erycinae
- Genus: Eryx; Daudin, 1803

Synonyms
- Clothonia Daudin, 1803; Cusoria Gray, 1849; Cursoria Günther, 1864; Pseudogongylophis Tokar, 1989

= Eryx (snake) =

Eryx Temporal range: Miocene–recent

Genus of snakes

Eryx is a genus of nonvenomous snakes, commonly known as Old World sand boas, in the subfamily Erycinae of the family Boidae. Species of the genus are found in southeastern Europe, northern Africa, the Middle East, and southwestern Asia. Thirteen species are recognized as being valid.

== Description ==
The genus Eryx has the following characters. The head is not distinct from the neck. The dorsal surface of the head is covered with small scales. The rostral is large. The eyes range from small to very small, and the pupils are vertical. The anterior maxillary teeth and anterior mandibular teeth are longer than the posterior ones. The body is almost cylindrical. The dorsal scales are smooth or keeled. The tail is very short, either not prehensile or only slightly prehensile. The subcaudals are undivided.

== Distribution and habitat ==
Species of snakes of the genus Eryx are found in southeastern Europe, northern Africa, the Middle East, and southwestern Asia.

== Species ==
Nota bene: In the list below, a taxon author in parentheses indicates that the species was originally described in a genus other than Eryx.

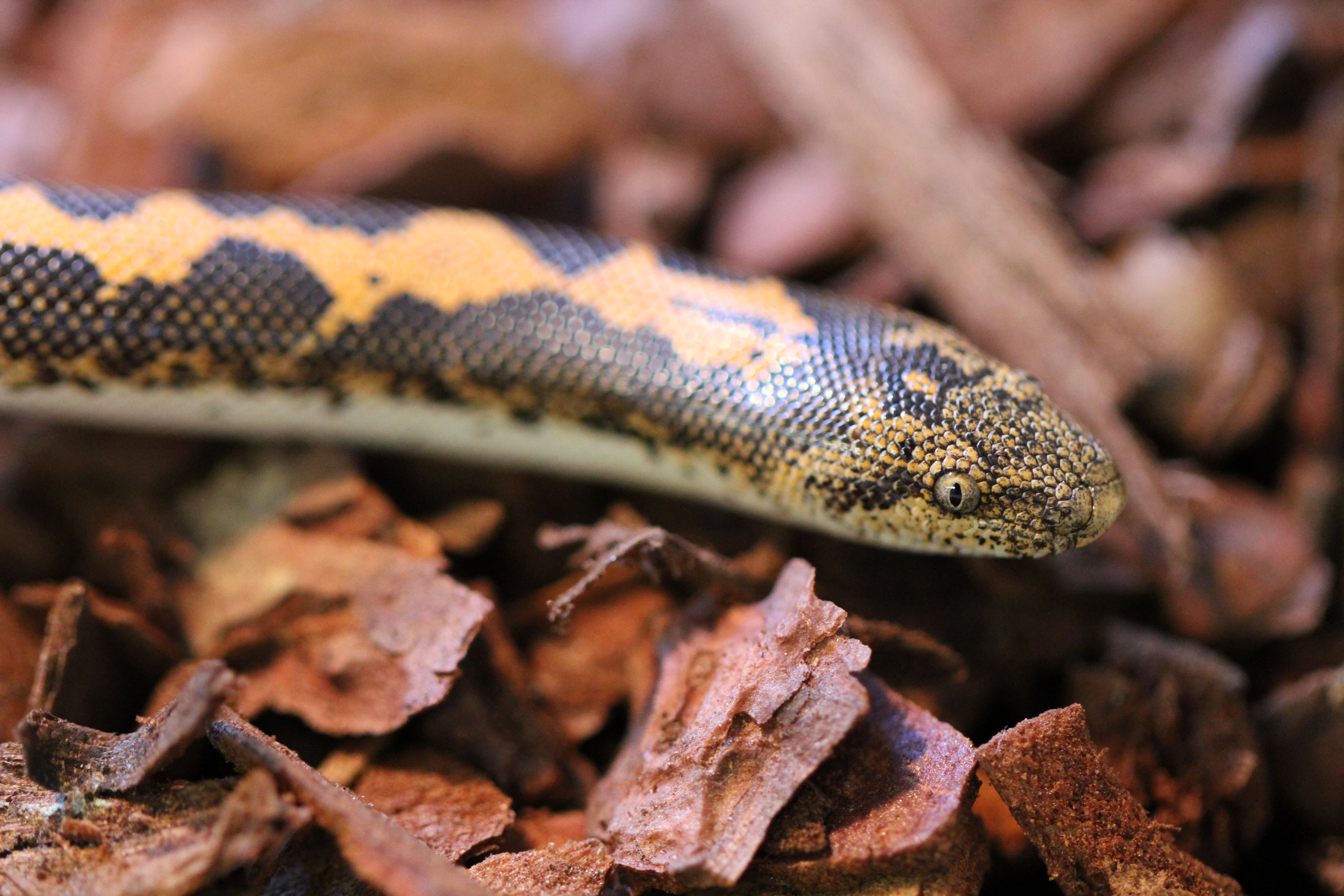
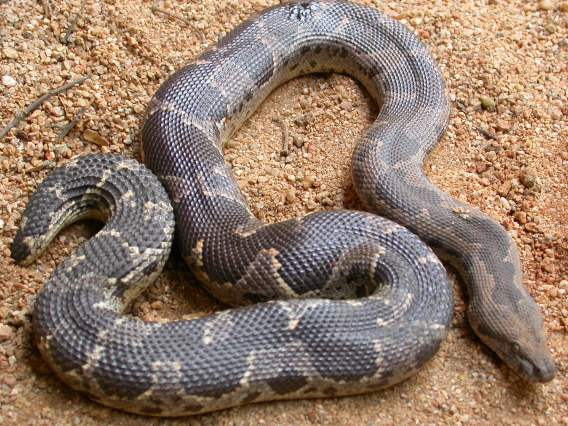
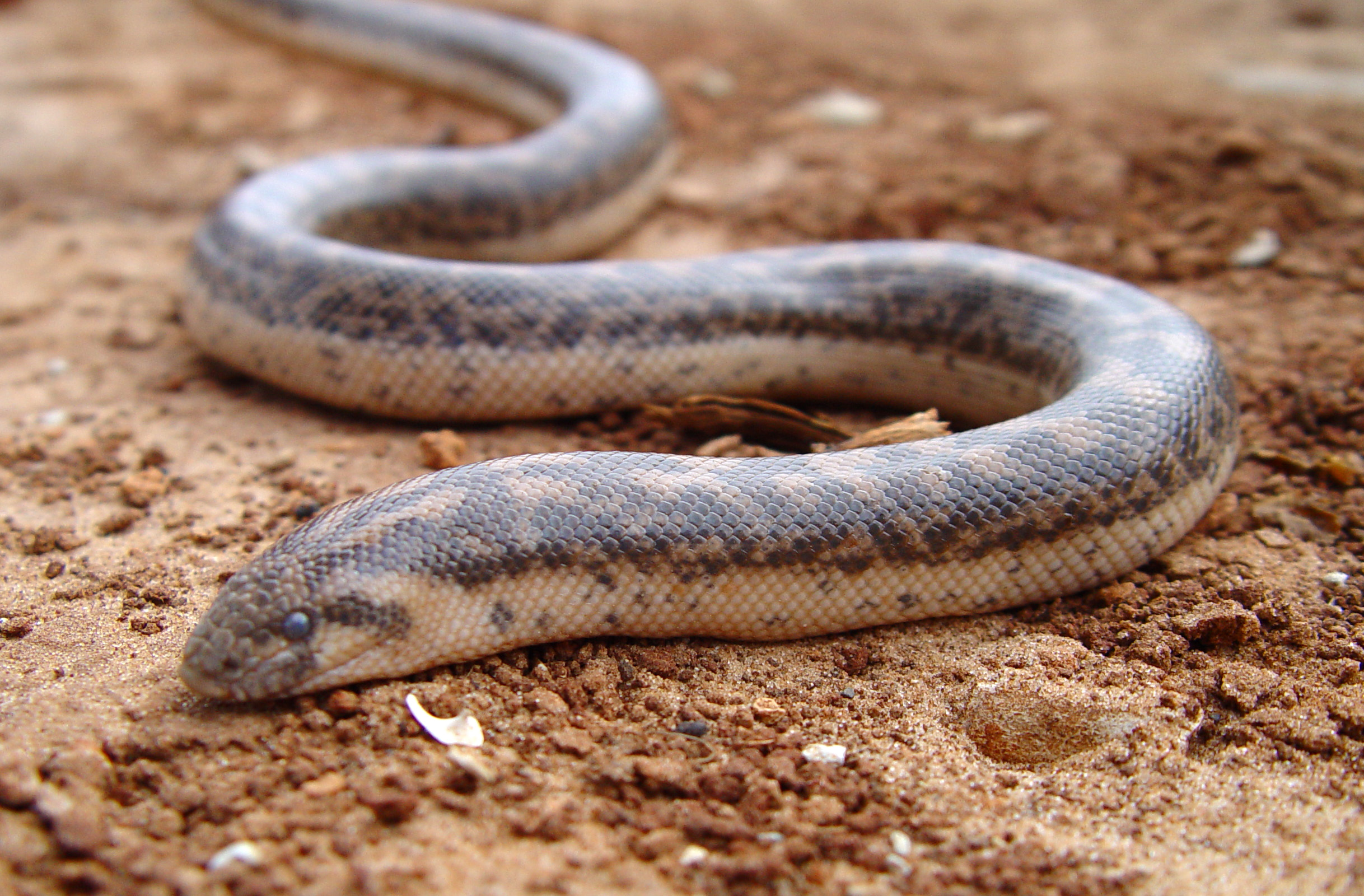
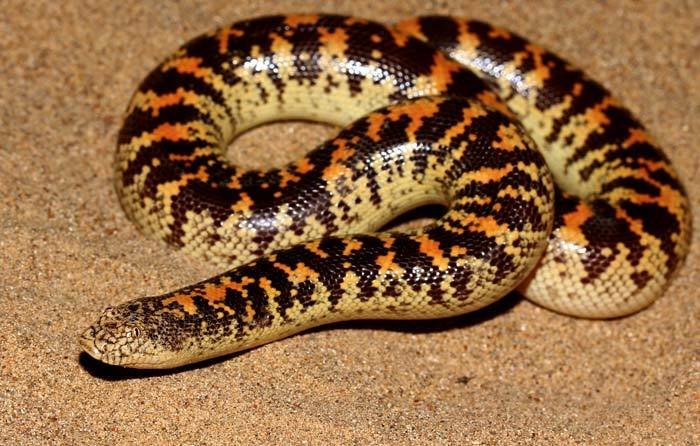
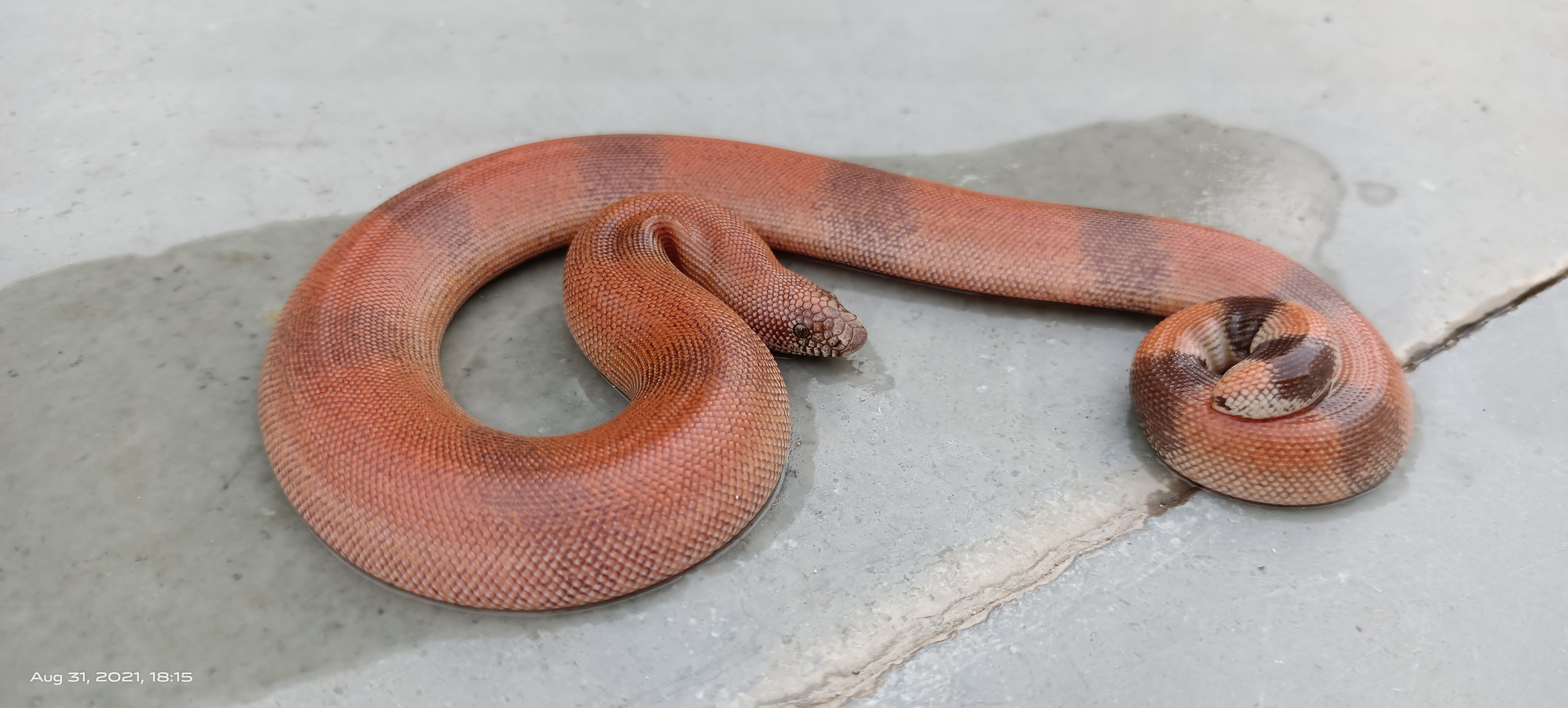
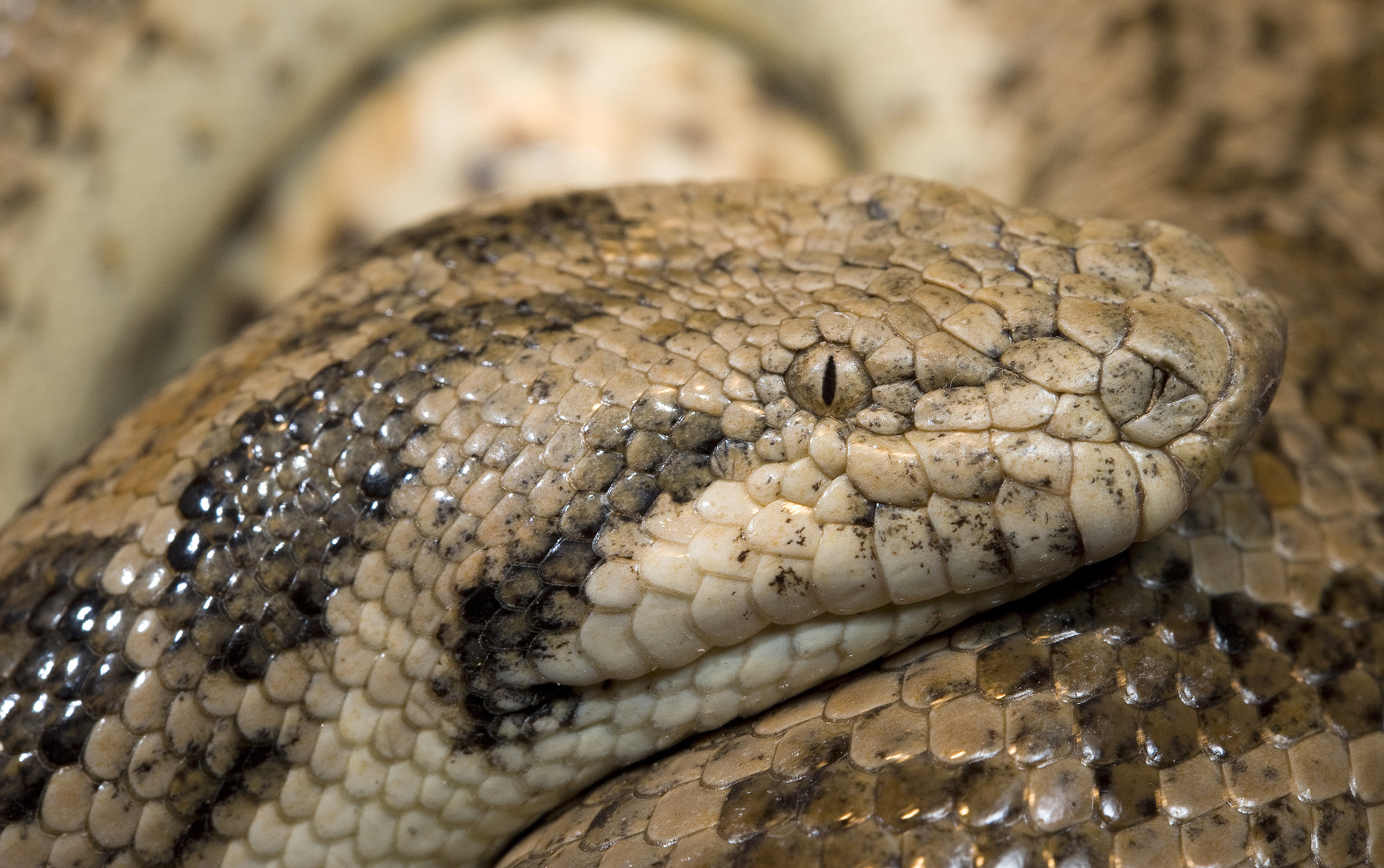
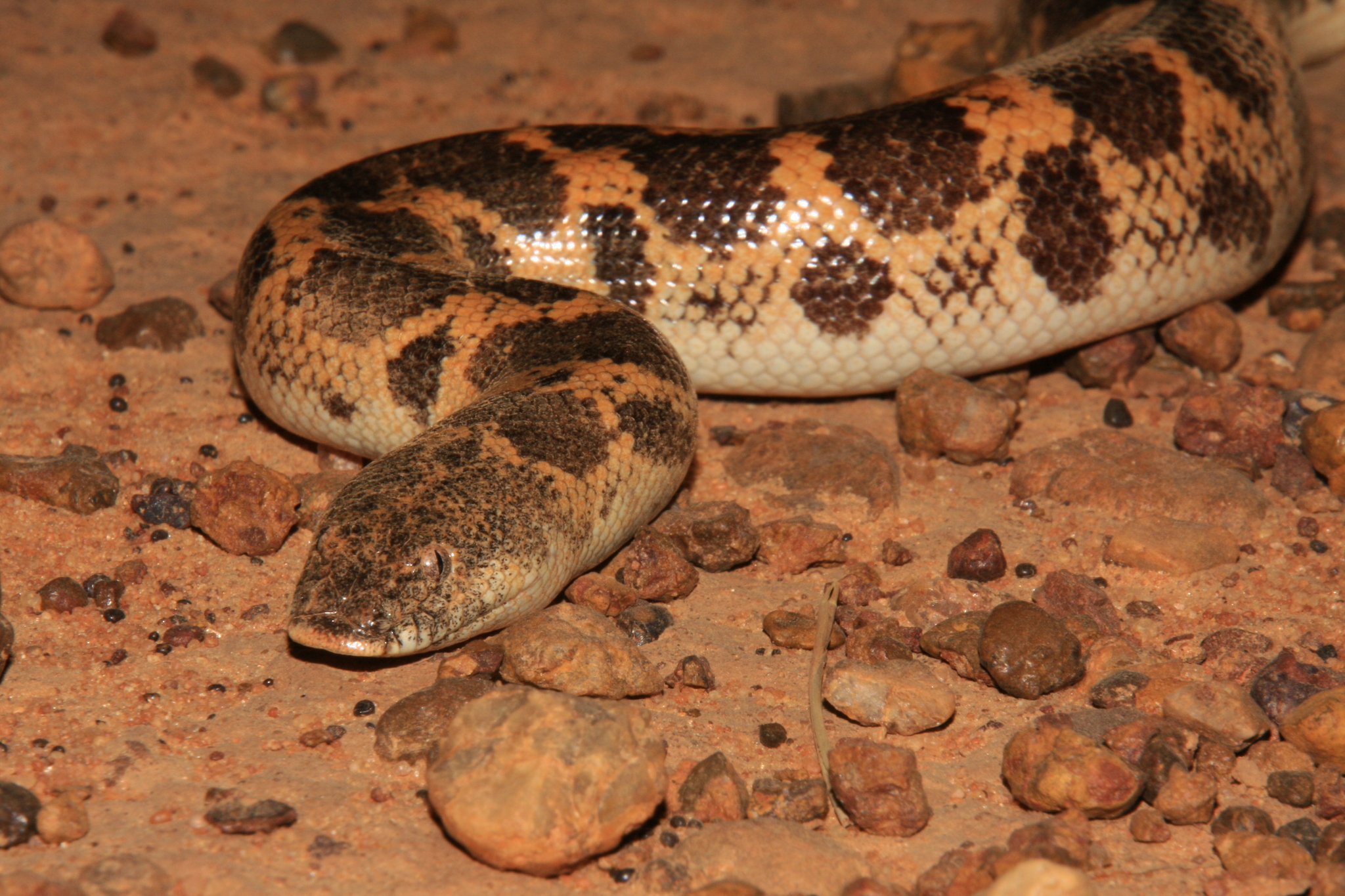
Species	Taxon author	Subspecies*	Common name	Geographic range
Eryx borrii	Lanza & Nistri, 2005	0	Borri's sand boa	Somalia
Eryx colubrinus	(Linnaeus, 1758)	2	Egyptian sand boa, Kenyan sand boa	Egypt, Sudan, South Sudan, Ethiopia, Eritrea, Kenya, Tanzania, Somalia
Eryx conicus	(Schneider, 1801)	0	Rough-tailed sand boa, common sand boa	Pakistan, Nepal, India, Sri Lanka
Eryx elegans	(Gray, 1849)	0	Central Asian sand boa	Southern Turkmenistan, northern Iran (the Kopet Dag Mountains in the northeast and the Azerbaijan region in the northwest) and Afghanistan
Eryx jaculus	(Linnaeus, 1758)	0	Javelin sand boa	Southern Italy, Eastern Europe in Romania, Bulgaria, Yugoslavia, Albania and Greece (including Corfu and the Cyclades). The Caucasus. The Middle East in Syria, Israel, northeastern Saudi Arabia, Iraq and Iran. Africa north of the Sahara Desert from Morocco to Egypt.
Eryx jayakari	Boulenger, 1888	0	Arabian sand boa	From the east and south of the Arabian Peninsula north to Khūzestān Province in Iran
Eryx johnii	(Russell, 1801)	0	Indian sand boa	From Iran through Pakistan into northwestern and southern India
Eryx miliaris	(Pallas, 1773)	0	Dwarf sand boa	From the northern Caucasus and the north coast of the Caspian Sea east through Kazakhstan to the north coast of the Aral Sea and Lake Balkhash, though the Zaysan Valley to Sinkiang in China and southern Mongolia. Also in northern and eastern Iran, Afghanistan and western Pakistan.
Eryx muelleri	(Boulenger, 1892)	1	Müller's sand boa	Mauritania, Senegal, Gambia, Guinea, Mali, Burkina Faso, Niger, Chad, Sudan, South Sudan, the Ivory Coast, Ghana, Togo, Benin, Nigeria, Cameroon, the Central African Republic
Eryx sistanensis	Eskandarzadeh, N. Rastegar-Pouyani, E. Rastegar-Pouyani, Zargan, Hajinourmohamadi, Nazarov, Sami, Rajabizadeh, Nabizadeh & Navaian, 2020	0	Sistan sand boa	Iran
Eryx somalicus	Scortecci, 1939	0	Somali sand boa	Somalia
Eryx vittatus	(Chernov, 1959)	0		Northern Iran, Tajikistan, northern Afghanistan, northern Pakistan, Kyrgyzstan, and eastern China
Eryx whitakeri	Das, 1991	0	Whitaker's sand boa	Southwestern coastal India in Kerala, Karnataka, Goa and southern Maharashtra

- Not including the nominate subspecies.

^{T} Type species.

=== Fossil taxa ===
Two fossil species are known. The earliest is E. linxiaensis from the Miocene of Gansu, China, which appears to be the sister species to Eryx colubrinus, suggesting several intercontinental dispersals from Africa to Eurasia during the Miocene. E. primitivus is known from the middle Pliocene of Spain, and appears to be an early offshoot of the main Eryx lineage.
