= Eryx linxiaensis =

Eryx linxiaensis Temporal range: Tortonian

Scientific classification
- Kingdom: Animalia
- Phylum: Chordata
- Class: Reptilia
- Order: Squamata
- Suborder: Serpentes
- Family: Boidae
- Genus: Eryx
- Species: †E. linxiaensis

Binomial name
- †Eryx linxiaensis Shi et al., 2023

Extinct species of snake

Eryx linxiaensis is an extinct species of sand boa in the genus Eryx that lived during the Tortonian stage of the Miocene epoch.

== Distribution ==
Eryx linxiaensis is known from the Liushu Formation of the Linxia Basin in Gansu, China.
