= Aprosdoketophis =

Conservation status
- Data Deficient (IUCN 3.1)

Scientific classification
- Kingdom: Animalia
- Phylum: Chordata
- Class: Reptilia
- Order: Squamata
- Suborder: Serpentes
- Family: Colubridae
- Genus: Aprosdoketophis; Wallach, Lanza, & Nistri, 2010
- Species: A. andreonei

Binomial name
- Aprosdoketophis andreonei Wallach, Lanza, & Nistri, 2010

Genus of snakes

Aprosdoketophis is a genus of snake in the family Colubridae that contains the sole species Aprosdoketophis andreonei.

It is endemic to Somalia.
