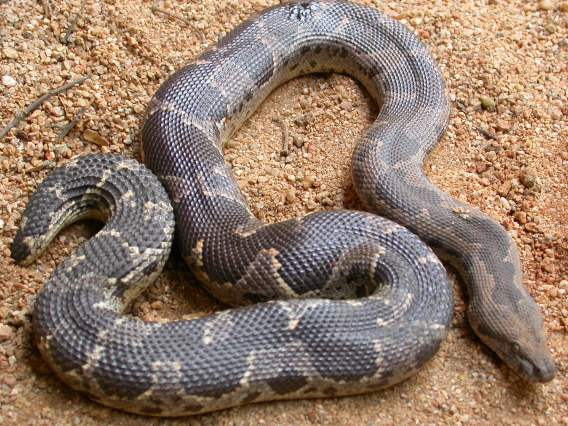

Conservation status
- Near Threatened (IUCN 3.1)

Scientific classification
- Kingdom: Animalia
- Phylum: Chordata
- Class: Reptilia
- Order: Squamata
- Suborder: Serpentes
- Family: Boidae
- Genus: Eryx
- Species: E. conicus

Binomial name
- Eryx conicus (Schneider, 1801)

Synonyms
- [Boa] Conica Schneider, 1801; Boa Viperina Shaw, 1802; Boa ornata Daudin, 1803; Erix Bengalensis Guérin, 1830; [Tortrix] eryx bengalensis — Schlegel, 1837; Gongylophis conicus — Wagler, 1842; Eryx conicus — A.M.C. Duméril & Bibron, 1844; Eryx conicus var. laevis W. Peters, 1869; Gongylophis conicus — Boulenger, 1890; Eryx conicus — Boulenger, 1893; Eryx conicus brevis Deraniyagala, 1951; Eryx conicus conicus — Rajendran, 1967; Eryx conicus gansi Rajendran, 1971; Gongylophis (Gongylophis) conicus — Tokar, 1989; [Eryx] conicus — Kluge, 1993; E[ryx]. conicus — Szyndlar & Schleich, 1994; Gongylophis [(Gongylophis)] conicus — Tokar, 1995

= Eryx conicus =

Species of reptile

Common names: Russell's sand boa, rough-tailed sand boa, common sand boa.

Eryx conicus is a species of non-venomous snake in the subfamily Erycinae of the family Boidae. The species is native to southern Asia. No subspecies are recognised as being valid.

== Description ==
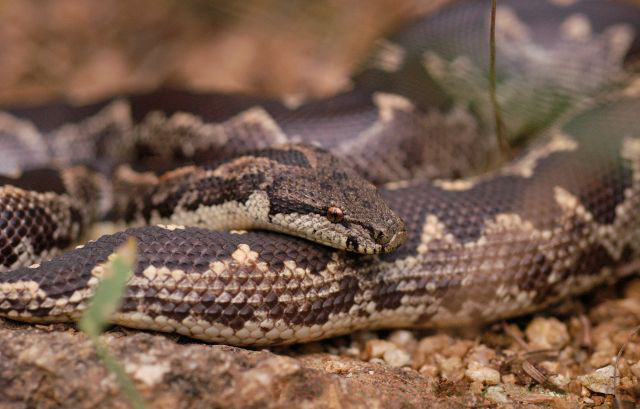
E. conicus

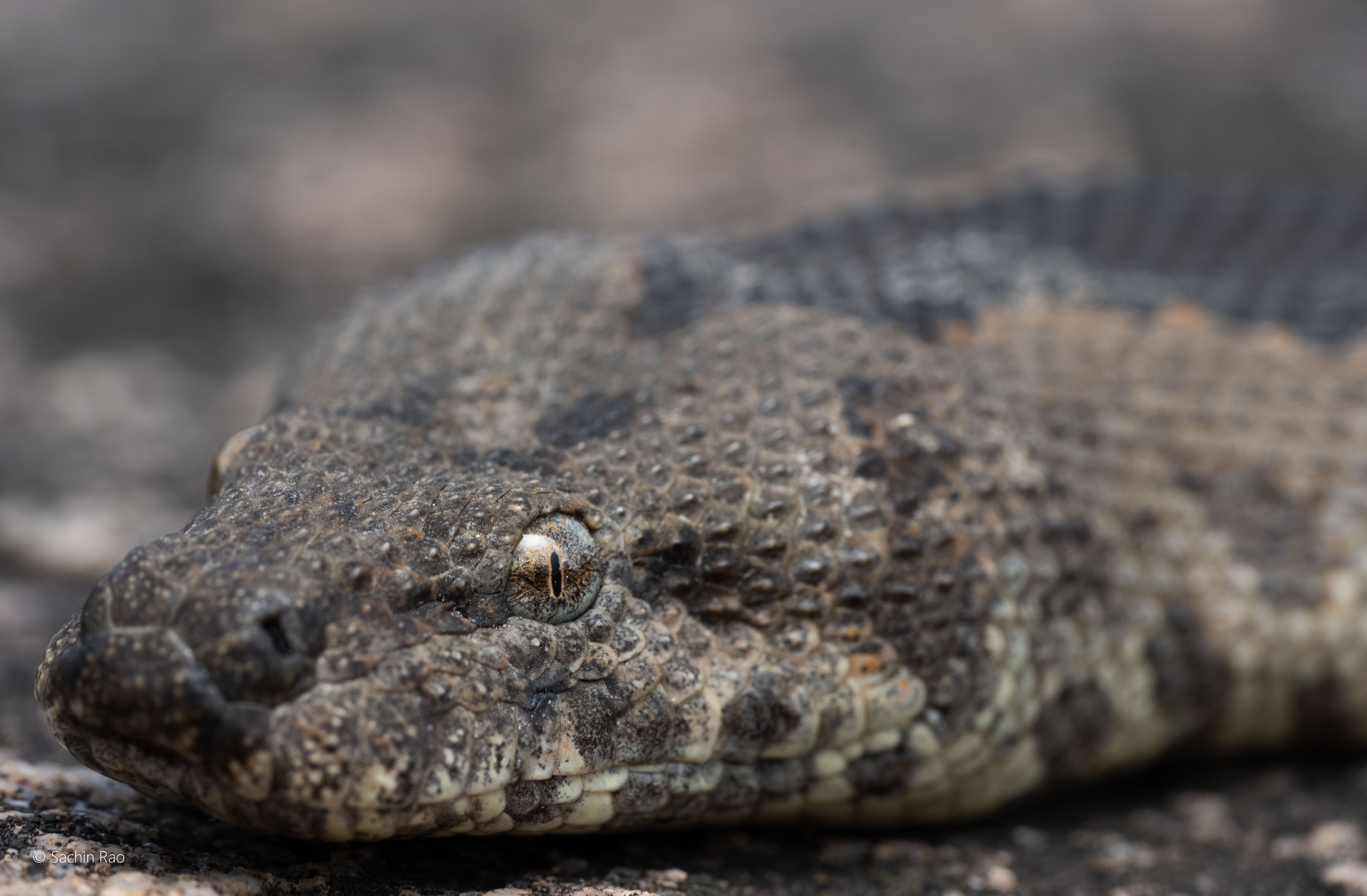
Common Sand Boa (Close Up)

Adults of E. conicus may attain a total length of 3 feet 3 inches (99 cm), which includes a tail 3 inches (76 mm) long.

The anterior maxillary and mandibular teeth are longer than the posterior. The head is covered with small scales. The eye is small with a vertical pupil. The dorsal scales are small and keeled. The tail is pointed, not or but very slightly prehensile.

The rostral scale is twice as broad as long, slightly prominent, without an angular horizontal edge. The top of the head is covered with small obtusely keeled scales, except for the nasals and internasals which are enlarged. Interorbitals: 8 to 10. Circumorbitals: 10 to 15. The eye is separated from the labials by one or two rows of scales. Supralabial scales: 12 to 14. Dorsal scales tubercularly keeled, in 40 to 49 rows. Ventral scales: 162-186. The anal scale is single. Subcaudals: 17-24.

The anterior dorsal scales are only feebly keeled, but these keels increase in size posteriorly to the point that they become so heavily keeled that it can make a squirming specimen really painful to handle. This also makes it look as if the front and rear ends belong to markedly different animals.

Dorsally, the color pattern consists of a broad zigzag band or a series of dark brown blotches on a yellowish or brownish grey ground color. The belly is uniform white.

In India it can be mistaken at first glance for either the Indian python (Python molurus) or the deadly Russell's viper (Daboia russelii).

== Behavior ==
E. conicus is active at dusk and at night.In many rural villages across South Asia, particularly in India, a prevalent rural myth dictates that being "licked" or bitten by a Common Sand Boa will cause irregular white patches, skin discoloration, or permanent "tattoos" across the body

== Diet ==
E. conicus preys upon birds and small mammals, which it kills by constricting.

== Geographic range ==
E. conicus is found in India south of about 30°N latitude, Nepal, Bangladesh and in the northern arid region of Sri Lanka. The type locality given is "India orientali ".

== Habitat ==
The preferred habitat of E. conicus is sandy tracts of central and southern India, the Punjab, Kachchh, and Sind.

== Mimicry ==
The rough-scaled sand boa's color pattern frequently resembles that of the highly venomous Russell's viper, which some herpetologists believe is a case of Batesian mimicry.

== Reproduction ==
E. conicus is viviparous.
