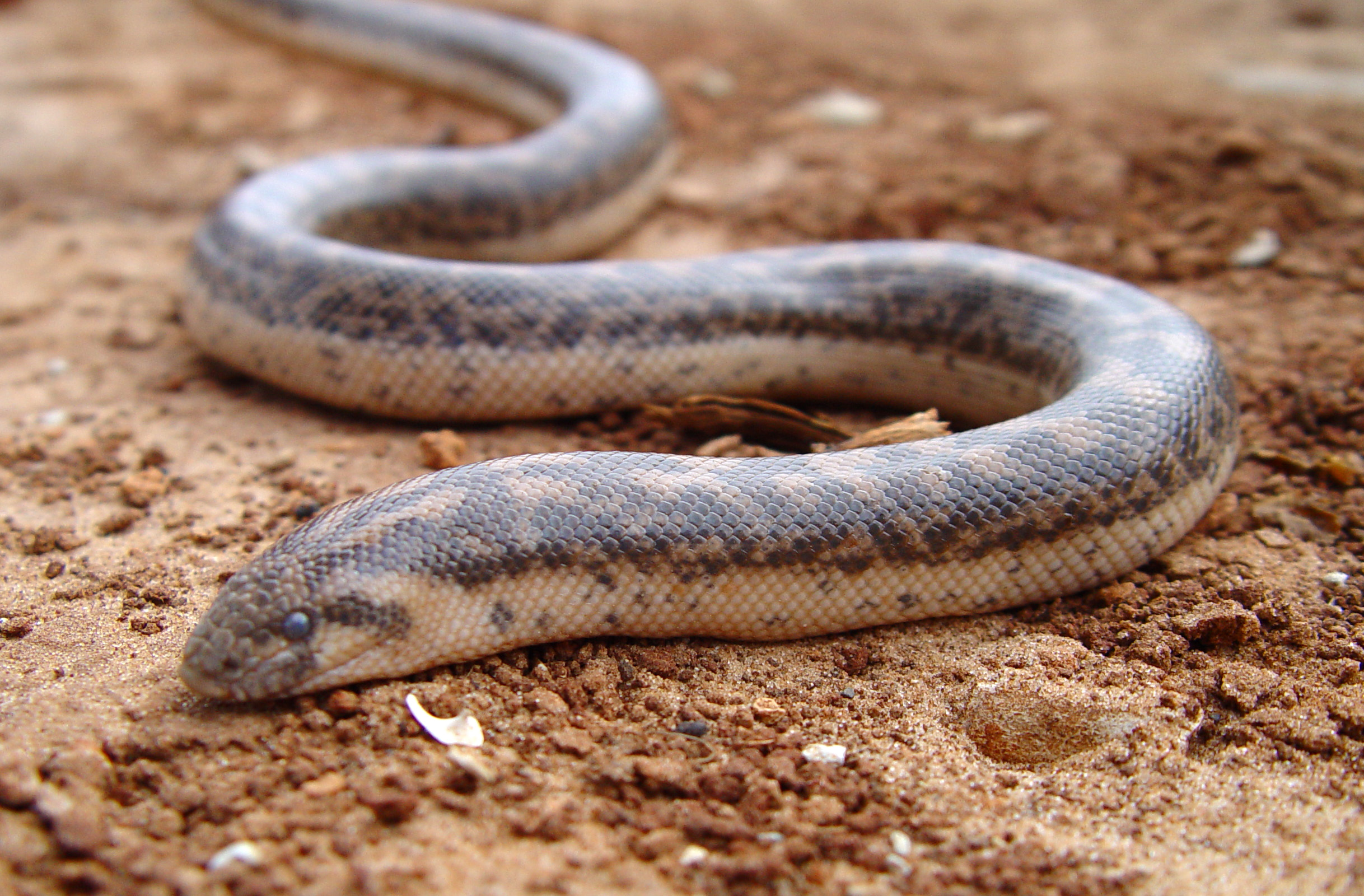
- Javelin sand boa (Eryx jaculus)

Scientific classification
- Kingdom: Animalia
- Phylum: Chordata
- Class: Reptilia
- Order: Squamata
- Suborder: Serpentes
- Family: Boidae
- Subfamily: Erycinae; Bonaparte, 1831

Synonyms
- Erycina Bonaparte, 1831; Erycidae Bonaparte, 1840; Erycina — Bonaparte, 1840; Erycides A.M.C. Duméril & Bibron, 1844; Charinidae Cope, 1900; Erycinae Kuhn, 1967; Erycinidae Kuhn, 1967

= Erycinae =

Erycinae Temporal range: Eocene–Recent

Subfamily of snakes

The Erycinae, also known as the Old World sand boas, are a subfamily of nonvenomous snakes in the family Boidae. Species of the subfamily Erycinae are found in Europe, Asia Minor, Africa, Arabia, central and southwestern Asia, India, Sri Lanka, and western North America. Four genera comprising 18 species are currently recognized as being valid.

== Description ==
Erycinae is a subfamily of stout-bodied snakes, all of which are competent burrowers. The largest, E. johnii, rarely exceeds 120 cm (47 in) in total length (including tail). Most grow to around 60 cm (24 in) in total length. They have small eyes and hard, small scales to protect their skin from the grit of sand. A great deal of sexual dimorphism exists, with females generally becoming much larger than males.

Erycines have skeletal adaptations to burrowing. The skull is more compact than in the subfamily Boinae. Also, the vertebrae of the tail are increased in size but reduced in number.

== Distribution and habitat ==
Erycines are found in Southeastern Europe, Asia Minor, North, Central, West and East Africa, Arabia, Central and Southwest Asia, India, Pakistan, Sri Lanka, southwestern Canada, the western United States, and northwestern Mexico.

Fossil erycines have been found in rock strata over 50 million years old, and were once widespread in North America. Now, only four species remain in North America, as well as the Old World sand boas proper in Africa, Asia, and Southeastern Europe.

The oldest known erycines are from the Eocene-aged Messel Pit in Germany, named Rageryx schmidi.

== Behavior ==
The majority of sand boas spend much of their time basking below the surface of the sand, with only their eyes or head exposed. When potential prey approaches, they erupt out of the sand, bite, and employ constriction to subdue it.

== Feeding ==
The erycines' primary diet is rodents, but they have also been known to prey on lizards and birds.

== Reproduction ==
Otherwise far removed from their boine relatives, erycines are generally ovoviviparous, i.e., giving birth to live young. At least two species lay eggs, however: the Arabian sand boa, Eryx jayakari, and the West African sand boa, Eryx muelleri.

== Smuggling and poaching in India ==
Poaching and smuggling of sand boas is often reported in India. Most of the smuggled snakes go to the United States. There is a misconception about their medicinal and aphrodisiacal properties, as well as the belief that keeping this snake as a pet brings wealth and prosperity.

== Captivity ==
Eryx colubrinus, E. conicus and E. johnii are frequently available in the exotic pet trade and are often captive-bred. They breed readily, their small size making them an attractive option. They are usually not aggressive species, though they sometimes have a tendency to bite, and also spend the vast majority of their time hiding. Other species are not commonly available, but are occasionally imported.

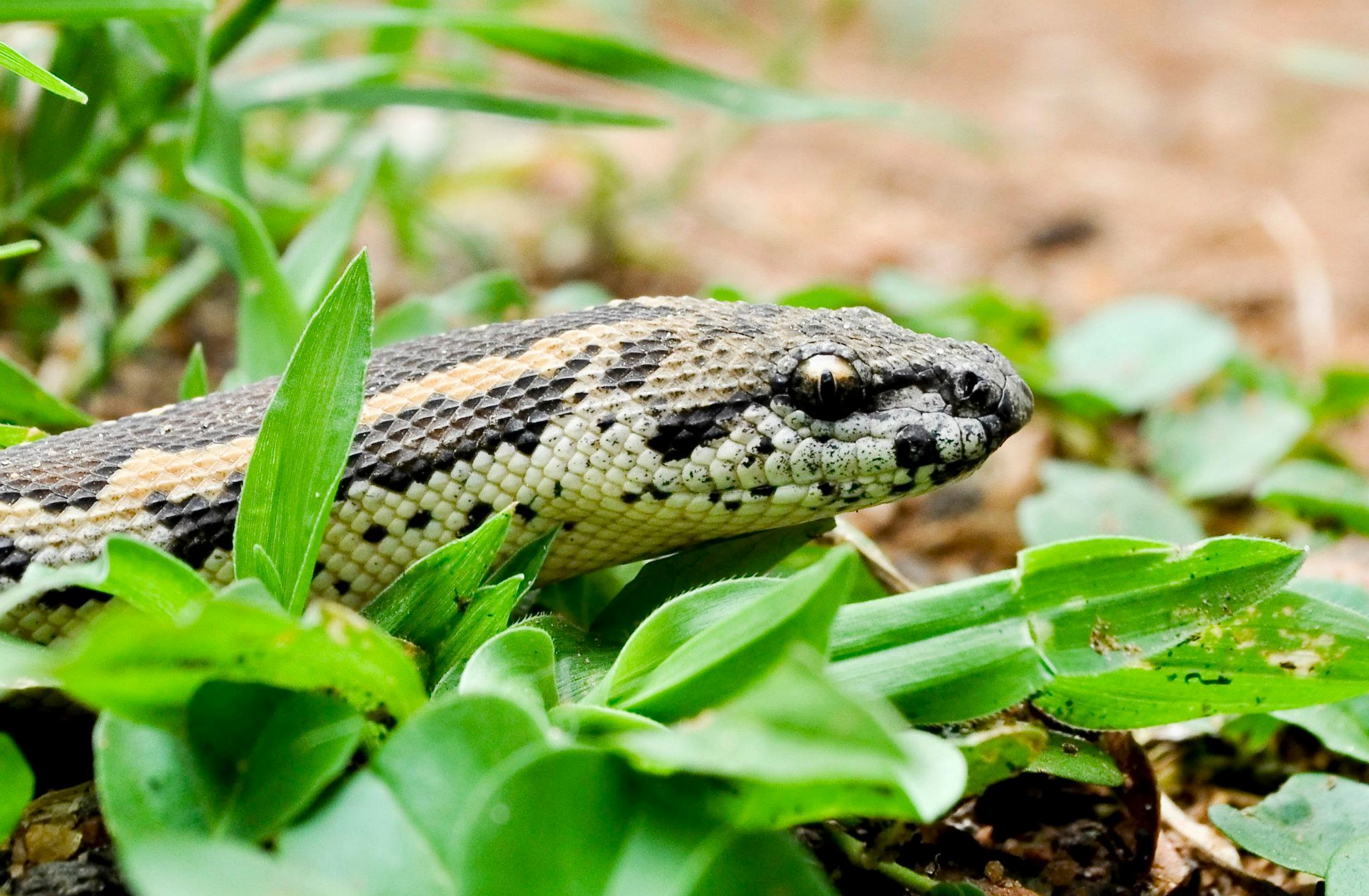
Rough-scaled sand boa

== Genera ==
Genus	Taxon author	Species	Subsp.*	Common name	Geographic range
Charina	Gray, 1849	2	0	rubber boas	North America from western Canada south through the western United States into northwestern Mexico
Eryx^{T}	Daudin, 1803	13	2	Old World sand boas	Southeastern Europe, North Africa, the Middle East and Southwest Asia
Lichanura	Cope, 1861	2	3	rosy boas	North America from western Canada through the southwestern United States and into northwestern Mexico

- Not including the nominate subspecies.
  ^{T} Type genus.

== See also ==
- List of erycine species and subspecies
