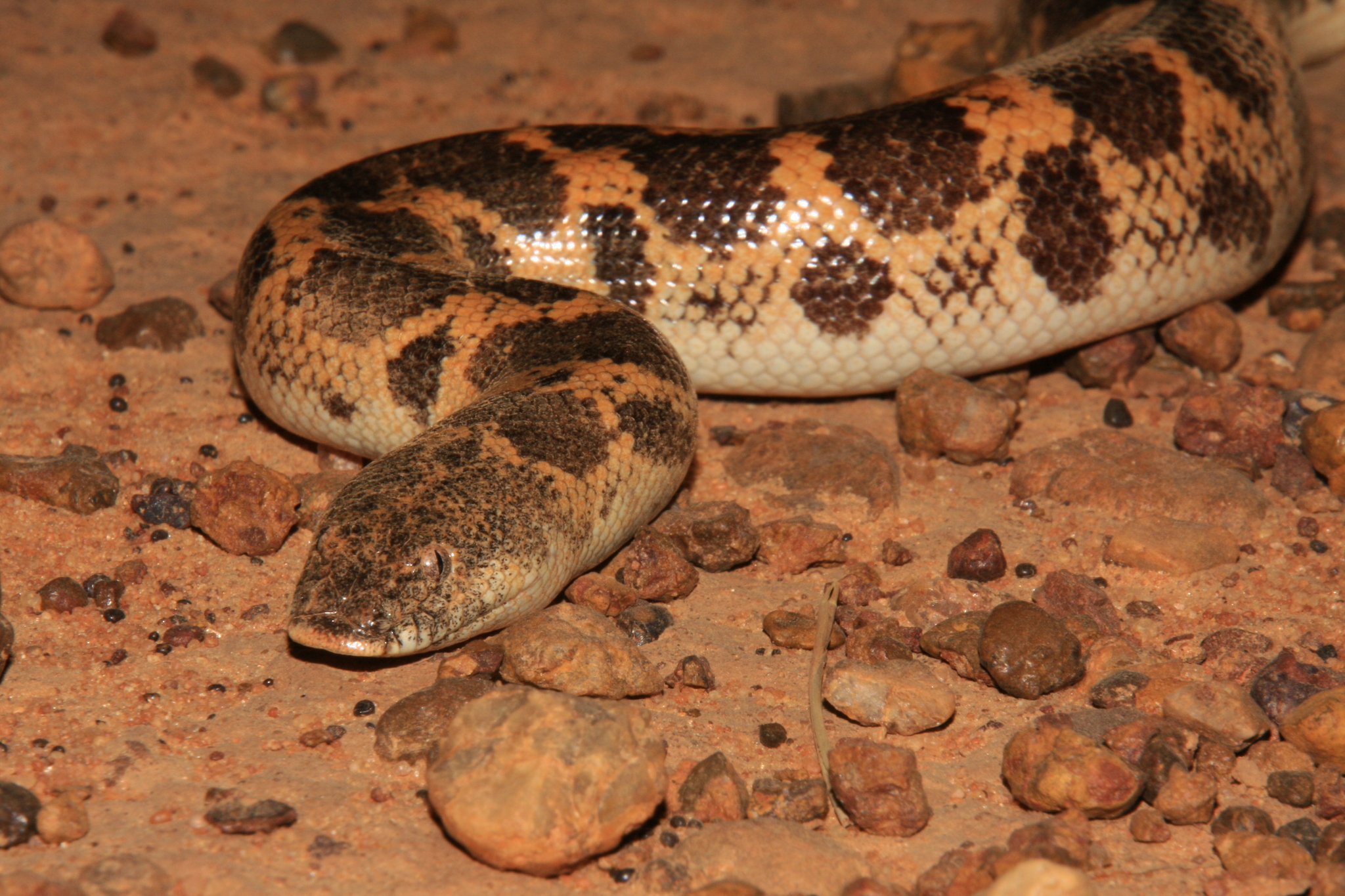

Conservation status
- Least Concern (IUCN 3.1)

Scientific classification
- Kingdom: Animalia
- Phylum: Chordata
- Class: Reptilia
- Order: Squamata
- Suborder: Serpentes
- Family: Boidae
- Genus: Eryx
- Species: E. muelleri

Binomial name
- Eryx muelleri Boulenger, 1892

Synonyms
- Gongylophis muelleri Boulenger, 1892; Eryx muelleri — Boulenger, 1893; Gongylophis muelleri — McDiarmid, Campbell & Touré, 1999; Eryx muelleri — Wallach et al., 2014

= Eryx muelleri =

Species of snake

Eryx muelleri, known commonly as Müller's sand boa or the Saharan sand boa, is a species of snake in the subfamily Erycinae of the family Boidae. The species is endemic to Africa. There are two recognized subspecies. It is kept fairly regularly in the pet industry due to its docile nature and easy care.

== Etymology ==
The specific name, muelleri, is in honor of Swiss herpetologist Fritz Müller.

== Geographic range ==
Eryx muelleri is found in Benin, Burkina Faso, Cameroon, the Central African Republic, Chad, Gambia, Ghana, Guinea, the Ivory Coast, Mali, Mauritania, Niger, Nigeria, Senegal, Sudan, and Togo.

== Habitat ==
The preferred natural habitats of Eryx muelleri are savanna and desert, at elevations from sea level to 500 m (1,600 ft).

== Behavior ==
Eryx muelleri is terrestrial, nocturnal, and fossorial.

== Diet ==
Eryx muelleri preys predominately upon small rodents, but also eats lizards.

== Reproduction ==
Eryx muelleri is oviparous.

== Subspecies ==
Two subspecies are recognized as being valid, including the nominate subspecies.

- Eryx muelleri muelleri Boulenger, 1892
- Eryx muelleri subniger (Angel, 1938)

Nota bene: The trinomial authority in parentheses indicates that the subspecies was originally described in a genus other than Eryx.
