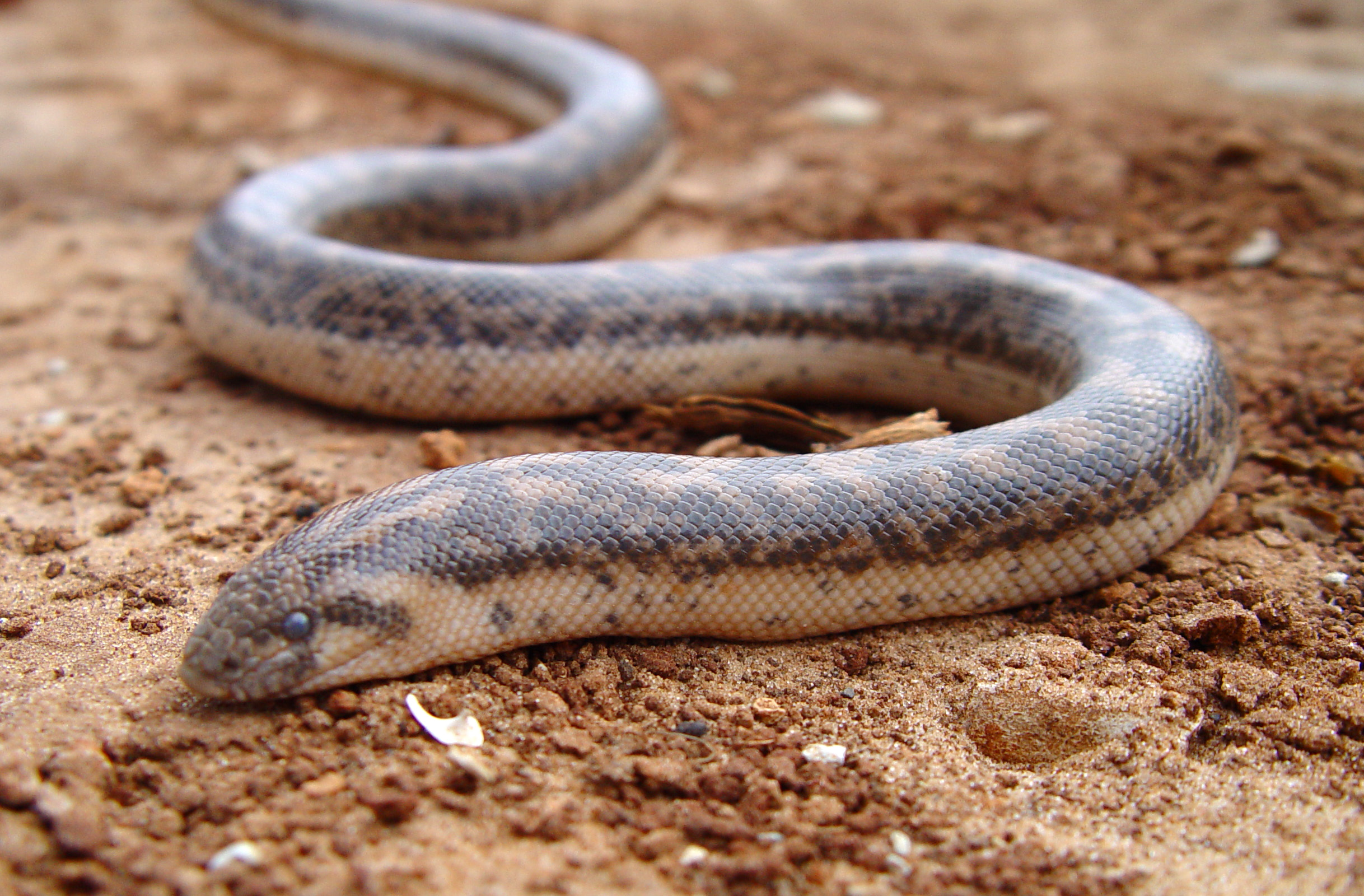

Conservation status
- Least Concern (IUCN 3.1)

Scientific classification
- Kingdom: Animalia
- Phylum: Chordata
- Class: Reptilia
- Order: Squamata
- Suborder: Serpentes
- Family: Boidae
- Genus: Eryx
- Species: E. jaculus

Binomial name
- Eryx jaculus (Linnaeus, 1758)

Synonyms
- Anguis jaculus Linnaeus, 1758; Eryx jaculus — Reuss, 1834

= Eryx jaculus =

Species of snake

Eryx jaculus, known commonly as the javelin sand boa, is a species of snake in the Boidae family. It is the type species of the genus Eryx.

== Description ==
Scientists from Razi university describe it as "brownish-green or gray, with darker blotches, belly white or yellowish, uniform or speckled darker" (Rhadi, Pouyani et al.)

The species is rather uniform in body thickness, a trait commonly seen in the Eryx genus.

== Geographic range ==
Eryx jaculus is found in Eastern Europe and Balkans, the Caucasus, the Middle East, and North-Africa. In September 2014 the snake was rediscovered in Romania near the Danube after being extinct in the country since 1937, when the last specimen was seen near Cochirleni. In late 2015 the snake was rediscovered near Licata on the south coast of Sicily after not having been officially recorded in Italy for eighty years. The snake has also been found in India, Sri Lanka and Mongolia. The Mongolian name of the snake is "batra" which can be translated to "father". Their diet consists of lizards, small mammals and other snake species.

== Description ==
The javelin sand boa may grow to 80 cm (31 1/2 in) in total length (including tail). Coloring varies greatly. Dorsally, it may be grayish, tan, brownish, or reddish, with darker blotches or bars in an irregular network. It usually has a dark streak from the eye to the corner of the mouth. Ventrally it is whitish or yellowish. It is heavy-bodied and has a short blunt tail. The ventrals are very narrow, less than a third of the width of the body. The rostral is large and broad with an angular horizontal edge. The eye is separated from the labials by one or two rows of small scales. There are 10-14 upper labials. The dorsal scales are in 40-50 rows, smooth anteriorly, but weakly keeled posteriorly. There are 165-200 ventrals, and 15-34 subcaudals. They are relatively built simple with small scales just like other snakes in their family. The snake has been very unstudied. In May and September 2014 scientists in Iraq with the help of locals were locating the snake. Schleich and Szyndlar write, "We want to know more about these snakes to find out about their past distribution of these snakes in the west" (Schleich, Szyndlar 234). All snakes under the Eryx genus have the same 3 scales pointed in different directions just like a star. You can identify it by its small eyes and neck. The whole head is covered with small scales. A very good description comes from the scientist at the university in Iran, "A green brown, or gray snake dorsally with darker blotches, and with a spotted yellowish or white belly; no neck, a stumpy tail, small plates on the head, a vertical pupil, posterior dorsals slightly keeled, ventrals narrow" (Rhadi, Pouyani et al.).

== Behaviour ==
The javelin sand boa exhibits a broader defensive repertoire than previously recognized. In addition to passive defenses such as remaining immobile, balling the body to conceal the head, retreating, and defecation, individuals may display active defensive behaviors when threatened. These include mock biting, full-body dorsolateral flattening, and, rarely, actual biting. Dorsolateral flattening increases the apparent body size of the snake and is frequently combined with mock biting, forming a conspicuous threat display. Mock biting is the most common active defensive response and is typically triggered during close-range encounters or handling, whereas true biting appears to be exceptionally rare. The expression of defensive behaviors is context-dependent: active displays are more common in exposed situations, while individuals in sheltered locations often remain motionless and rely on crypsis. These observations suggest that E. jaculus employs a flexible and hierarchical antipredator strategy in which concealment, postural displays, bluffing, and, only as a last resort, physical aggression are used according to the level of perceived threat.

== Other ==
The javelin sand boa was one of a number species of snake used by ancient Greeks as projectiles during naval battles in order to cause fear and confusion on enemy vessels. Its habitat spread from its original location to the areas conquered and settled by the Greeks.
