= List of baronetcies in the Baronetage of the United Kingdom: A =

Peerages and baronetcies of Britain and Ireland
Extant	All
Dukes	Dukedoms
Marquesses	Marquessates
Earls	Earldoms
Viscounts	Viscountcies
Barons	Baronies
Baronets	Baronetcies
En, Ire, NS, GB, UK (extinct)

This is a list of baronetcies in the Baronetage of the United Kingdom. They have been created since 1801 when they replaced the baronetages in the Baronetage of Great Britain, and Baronetage of Ireland. This list is not currently complete.

Title	Date of creation	Surname	Current status	Notes
Abdy of Albyns	1849	Abdy	extant	
Abel of Whitehall Court	1893	Abel	extinct 1902	
Ackroyd of Dewsbury	1956	Ackroyd	extant	Lord Mayor of London
Acland of Oxford	1890	Acland	extant	
Adair of Flixton Hall	1838	Adair	extinct 1988	
Adam of Blair	1882	Blair	extinct 1922	
Adam of Hankelow	1917	Adam	extant	
Agnew of Clendry	1957	Agnew	extant	
Agnew of The Planche	1895	Agnew	extant	
Ainsley of Great Torrington	1804	Ainsley	extinct 1858	
Ainsworth of Ardanaiseig	1917	Ainsworth	extant	
Aird of London	1901	Aird	extant	
Aitchison of Lemmington	1938	Aitchison	extant	
Aitken of Chirkley	1916	Aitken	extant	first Baronet created Baron Beaverbrook in 1917
Albu of Johannesburg	1912	Albu	extant	
Alexander of Ballochmyle	1886	Alexander, Hagart-Alexander	extant	
Alexander, later Cable-Alexander of Belcamp	1809	Alexander, Cable-Alexander	dormant	seventh Baronet died 1988
Alexander of Edgehill	1921	Alexander	extant	
Alexander of Sundridge Park	1945	Alexander	extant	Lord Mayor of London
Alison of Possil House	1852	Alison	extinct 1970	
Allan of Kinsgate	1819	Allan	extinct 1820	
Allen of Marlow	1933	Allen	extinct 1939	
Allsopp of Alsop-le-Dale	1880	Allsopp	extant	first Baronet created Baron Hindlip in 1880
Anderson of Ardtaraig	1919	Anderson	extinct 1942	
Anderson of Fermoy	1813	Anderson	extinct 1861	
Anderson of Harrold Priory	1920	Anderson	extinct 1963	
Anderson of Mullaghmore House	1911	Anderson	extinct 1921	Lord Mayor of Belfast
Andrews of Comber	1942	Andrews	extinct 1951	
Anson of Hatch Beauchamp	1831	Anson	extant	
Anstruther-Gough-Calthorpe of Elveham	1929	Anstruther-Gough-Calthorpe	extant	
Anstruther-Gray of Kilmany	1956	Anstruther-Gray	extinct 1985	first Baronet created a life peer as Baron Kilmany in 1966
Antrobus of Antrobus Hall	1815	Antrobus	extant	
Arbuthnot of Edinburgh	1823	Arbuthnot	extant	Lord Provost of Edinburgh
Arbuthnot of Kittybrewster	1964	Arbuthnot	extant	
Archdale of Riversdale	1928	Archdale	extant	
Armstrong of Ashburn Place	1892	Armstrong	extinct 1944	
Armstrong of Gallen Priory	1841	Armstrong	extant	
Arnott of Baily	1896	Arnott	extant	
Arthur of Carlung	1903	Arthur	extant	first Baronet created Baron Glenarthur in 1918
Arthur of Upper Canada	1841	Arthur	extant	
Ashman of Thirmlere	1907	Ashman	extinct 1916	
Aske of Aughton	1922	Aske	extant	
Assheton of Downham	1945	Assheton	extant	second Baronet had been created Baron Clitheroe in 1955 prior to succeeding to the baronetcy
Astley of Everley	1821	Astley	extinct 1994	
Astley-Cooper of Gadebridge	1821	Astley-Cooper	extant	
Austin of Red Hill	1894	Austin	extant	
Avery of Oakley	1905	Avery	extinct 1918	
Aykroyd of Bristwith Hall	1929	Aykroyd	extant	
Aykroyd of Lightcliffe	1920	Aykroyd	extant	
Aylwen of St Bartholomews	1949	Aylwen	extinct 1967	Lord Mayor of London
