= Archibald Alison =

Archibald Alison may refer to:

- Archibald Alison (author) (1757–1839), Scottish episcopalian minister and essayist
- Sir Archibald Alison, 1st Baronet (1792–1867), Scottish lawyer and historian (son of the priest)
- Sir Archibald Alison, 2nd Baronet (1826–1907), British Army general (son of the lawyer)
