= Sir Archibald Alison, 1st Baronet =

Scottish advocate and historian (1792–1867)

Sir Archibald Alison Bt, FRSE
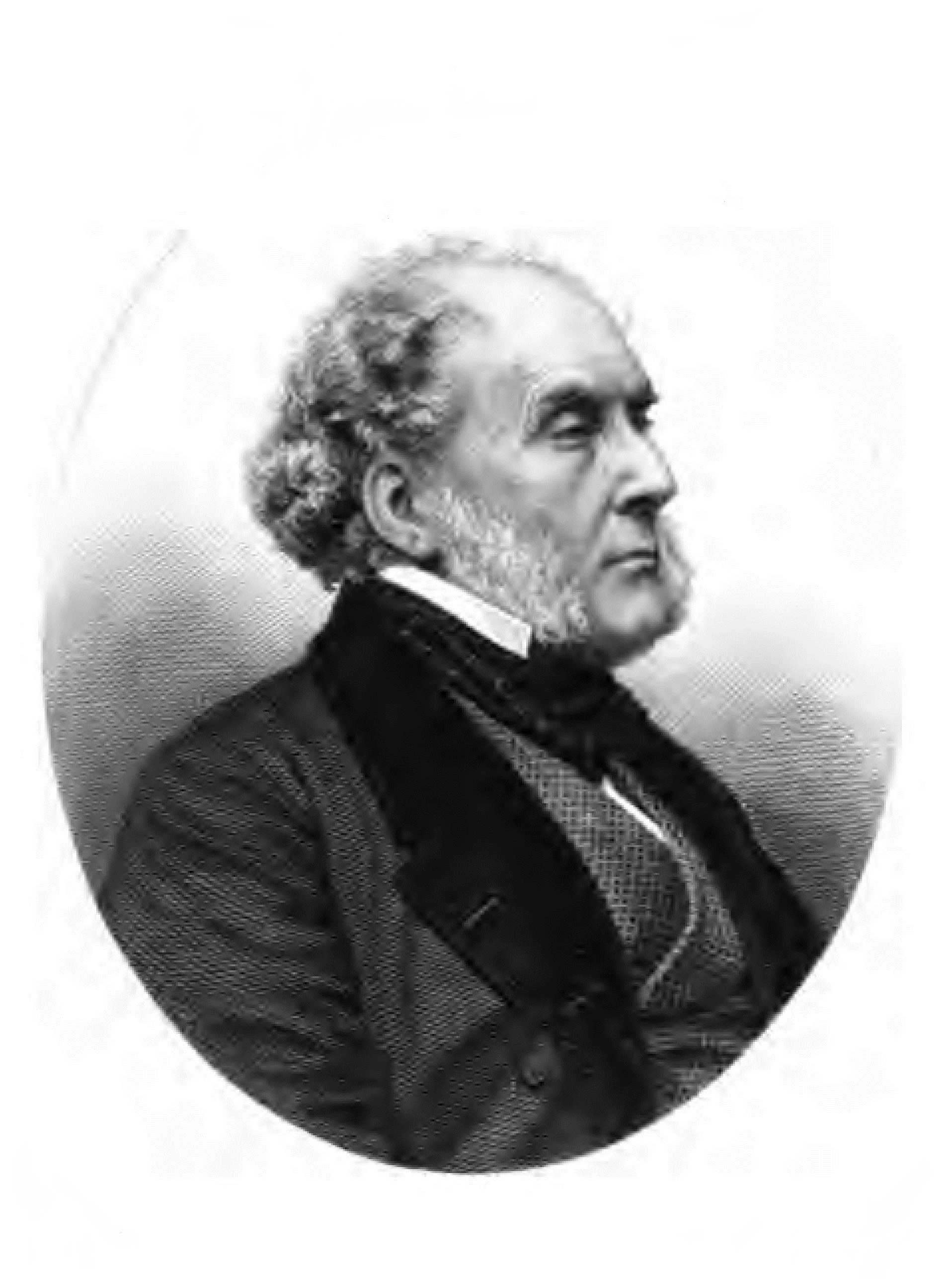
- Sir Archibald Alison
- Born: 29 December 1792; Parsonage of Kenley, Shropshire, England
- Died: 23 May 1867 (aged 74); Possil House, Glasgow, Scotland
- Resting place: Dean Cemetery, Edinburgh, Scotland
- Citizenship: United Kingdom
- Education: Edinburgh University
- Occupations: Advocate; Historian
- Spouse: Elizabeth Glencairn Tytler (m. 1825) (d. 1874)
- Relatives: Father: Rev Archibald Alison; Brother: Professor William Alison; Uncle: Professor James Gregory; Cousin: Professor William Gregory
- Writing career
- Genres: Law; History
- Notable works: Principles of the Criminal Law of Scotland (1832); The Practice of the Criminal Law (1833); History of Europe, 19 volumes (1833–1843)

Signature
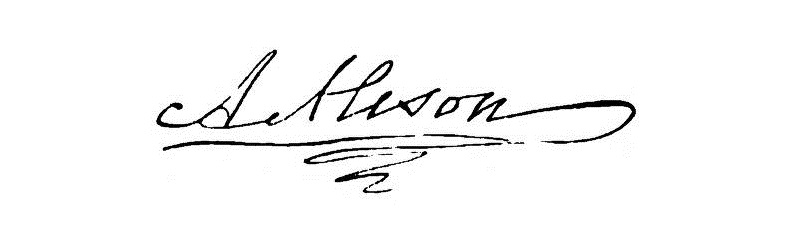

Sir Archibald Alison, 1st Baronet, FRSE (29 December 1792 – 23 May 1867) was a Scottish advocate and historian. He held several prominent legal appointments. He was the younger son of the Episcopalian cleric and author Archibald Alison. His elder brother was the physician and social reformer William Pulteney Alison.

== Background ==
He was born at the parsonage at Kenley, Shropshire, to the Rev. Archibald Alison and his wife Dorothea Gregory, daughter of John Gregory, and granddaughter of James Forbes, 17th Lord Forbes. In 1800 his parents moved the family back to Edinburgh, as his father thought that he could give his sons a better education and more independent careers in Scotland.

After studying under a private tutor, and at the University of Edinburgh, he was, in 1814, admitted to the Faculty of Advocates, at which he ultimately attained some distinction, becoming in 1834 Sheriff of Lanarkshire. In 1853, he received an Honorary Doctorate of Civil Law by the University of Oxford.

Alison actively opposed the abolition of slavery in the British Empire. Following the United Kingdom's Slavery Abolition Act 1833 and the Slave Compensation Act 1837 he benefited from a Government payout of more than £4,000 (equivalent to £346,000 in 2015).

== Writings ==
When travelling in France in 1814 he conceived the idea of his expansive History of Europe from the commencement of the French revolution to the restoration of the Bourbons. This multi-volume set is usually regarded as Alison's chief historical work and is considered to be the first scholarly English-language study of the French Revolution. Published in ten volumes between 1833 and 1843, History of Europe was revised and reprinted many times throughout the century, including numerous foreign language editions. The work is one of vast industry, "contain[ing] a wealth of information communicated in a vigorous though wordy style."

Disraeli satirises the author in Coningsby as Mr. Wordy, who wrote a history to prove that Providence was on the side of the Tories. Such criticism notwithstanding, History of Europe proved to be a huge commercial success. By 1848 100,000 copies had been sold in the United States. It was translated into French, German, and even Arabic, in which language 2,000 copies were published "under the auspices of the Pasha of Egypt." Alison's book collection grew exponentially while he wrote the History as he acquired more and more source material over the years. By the 1840s, the author's collection had grown into an enormous library worth, in his estimation, £4,000 — a massive sum for that period. Alison evidently "feared that 'one of the race of critics' would discover an obscure book, pronounce it indispensable, and charge him with neglecting it."

Alison also composed a comprehensive survey of the military campaigns of the Duke of Marlborough, as well as two standard works on the criminal law of Scotland.

== Rector ==
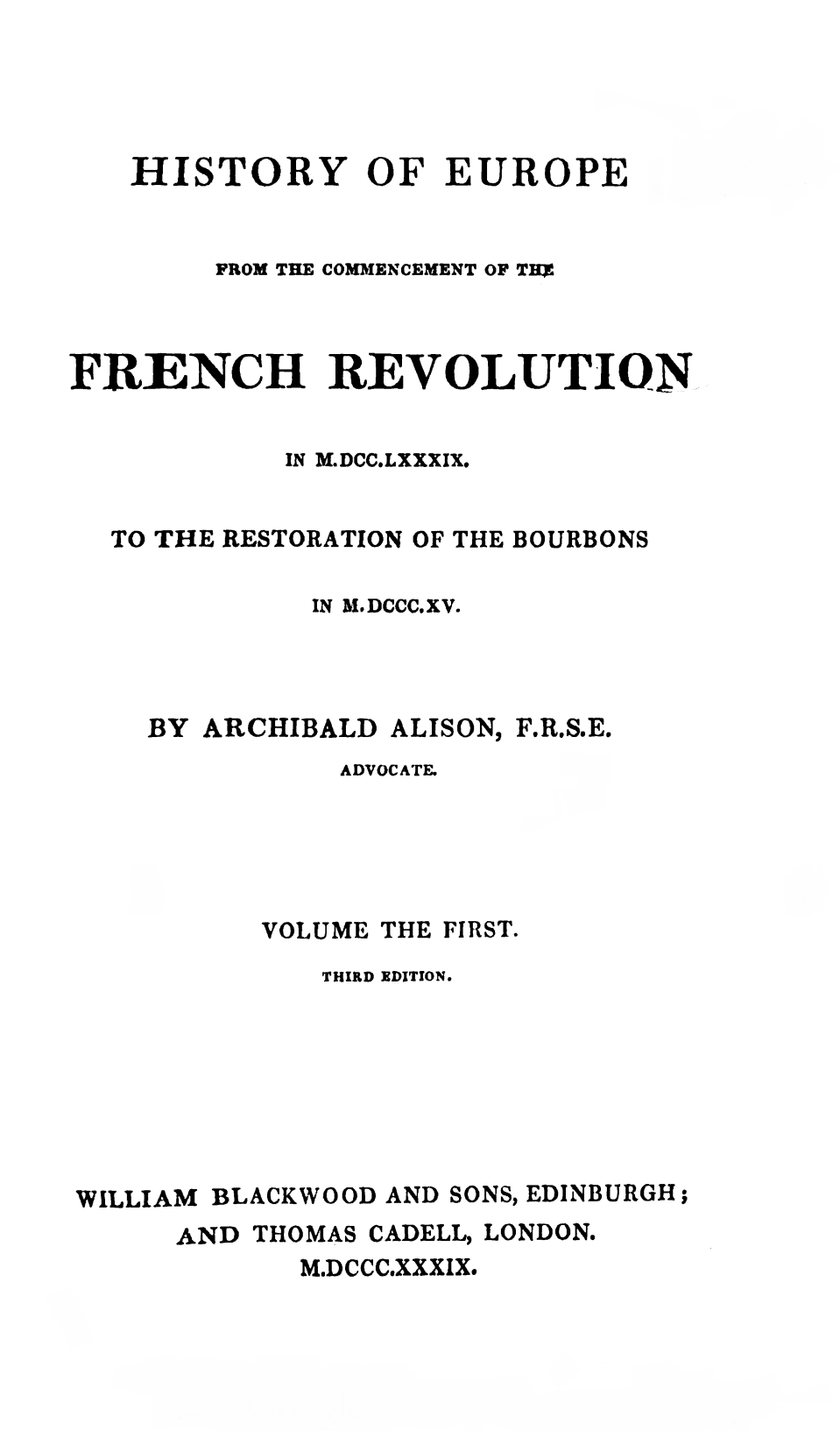
Title page of Alison's History of Europe.

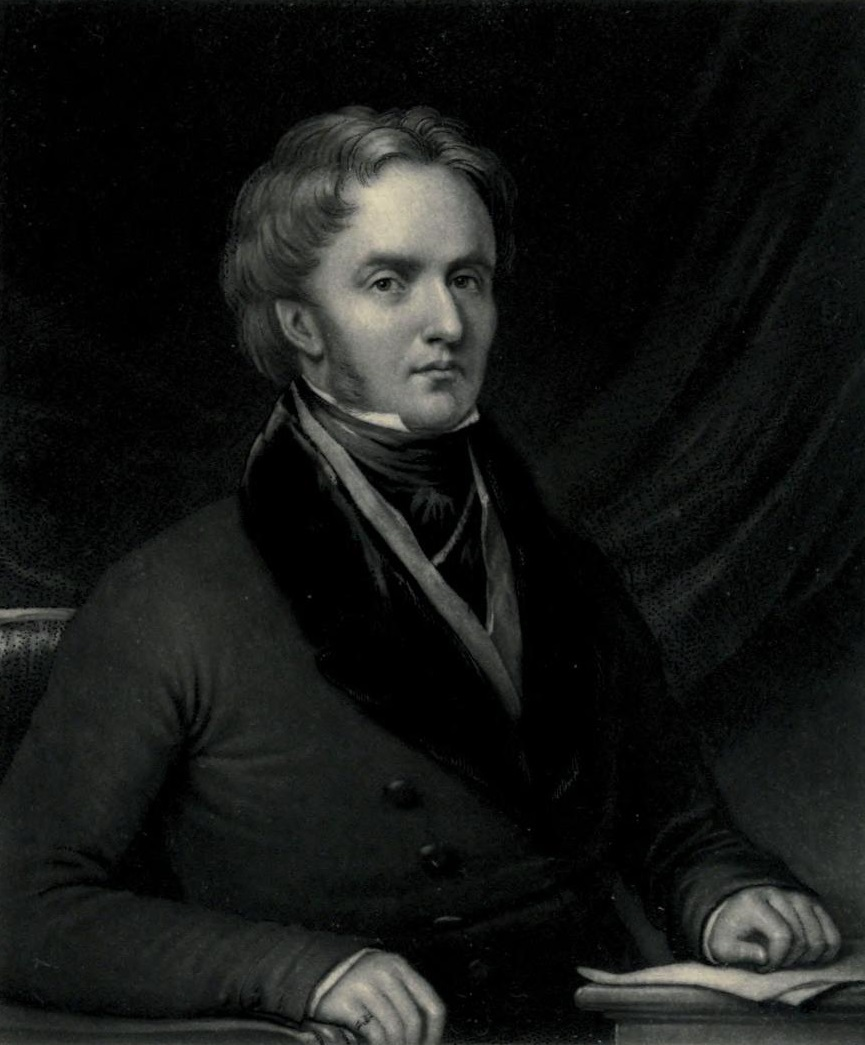
Sir Archibald Alison, by J. Watson Gordon.

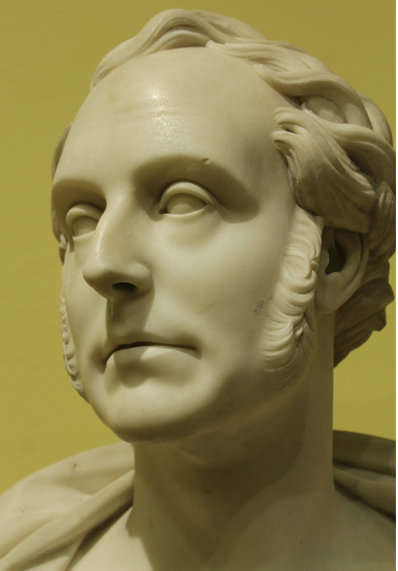
Bust of Sir Archibald Alison by Patric Park, Scottish National Portrait Gallery

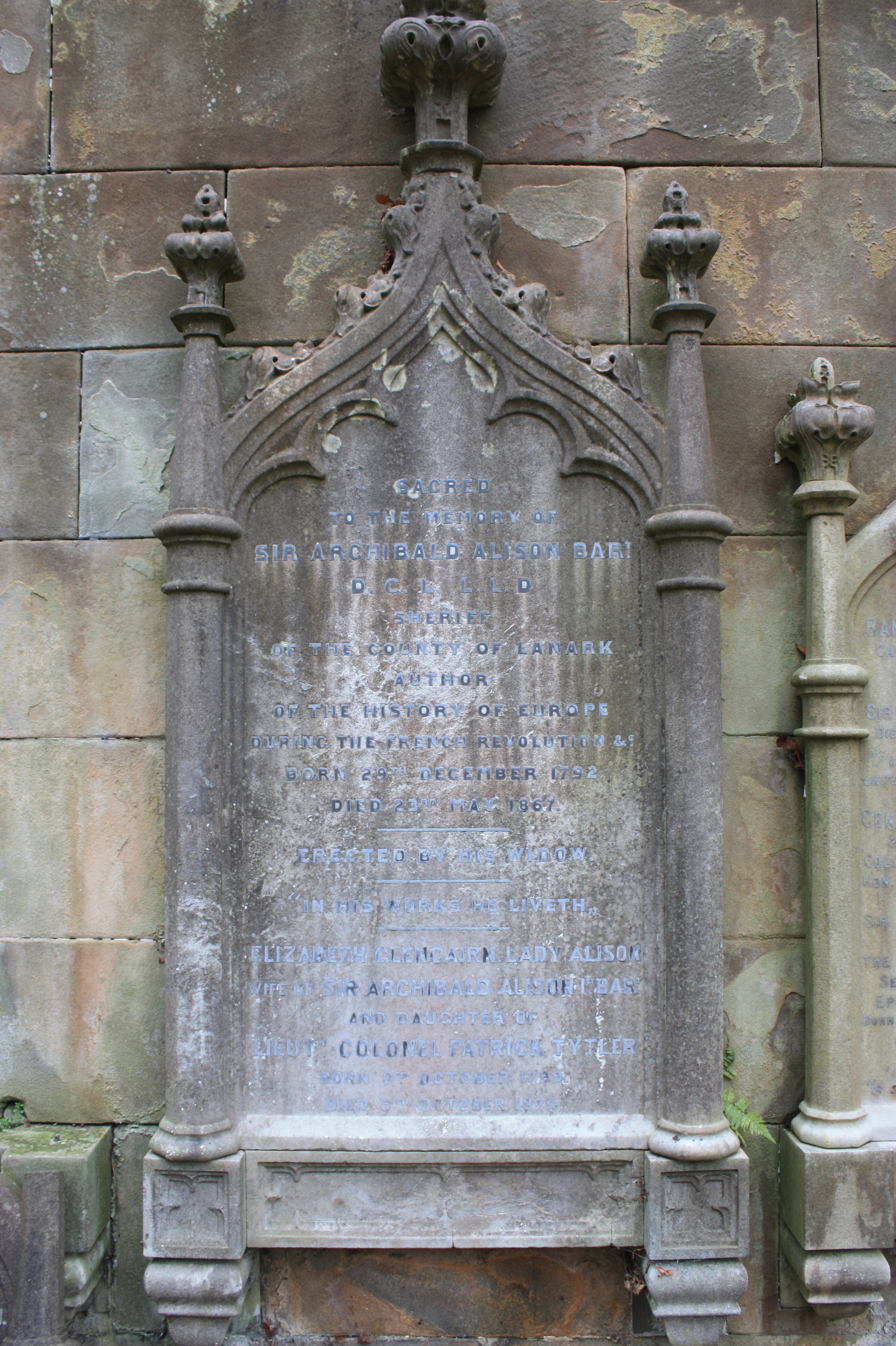
The grave of Sir Archibald Alison, 1st Baronet, Dean Cemetery.

He was elected Lord Rector successively of Marischal College, Aberdeen, and of the University of Glasgow. On 25 June 1852 he was created a baronet, during Lord Derby's administration.

== Family and death ==
In 1825, he married Elizabeth Glencairn Tytler (1799-1874), the daughter of Lieutenant Colonel Patrick Duff Tytler (1760-1849); the children from the marriage were Archibald, Frederick and Ella Frances Catherine who married James Charlemagne Dormer. Both sons became distinguished British military officers. The 1st Baronet's autobiography was published in 1883; his portrait was painted by Robert Scott Lauder.

Alison died at Possil House, Glasgow, at the age of 74, and was interred in Dean Cemetery, Edinburgh. He enjoyed great popularity in Glasgow. His funeral was attended by a crowd of from 100,000 to 150,000 people. His grave lies amid the "Lord's Row" against the western wall, and is modest in comparison to most in this section.

He was succeeded in the baronetcy by his elder son, Sir Archibald Alison, 2nd Baronet.

== Works ==
- History of Europe from the Commencement of the French Revolution in 1789 to the Restoration of the Bourbons in 1815 (1833–1843, 10 vol.) (The 10th edition of the work was reprinted in 1973 by AMS Press in hardcover; in 2010, the 1st edition was reprinted by Cambridge University Press as part of their Cambridge Library Collection series.)
- Principles of the Criminal Law of Scotland (1832)
- Practice of the Criminal Law of Scotland (1833)
- Principles of Population, and Their Connection with Human Happiness (1840, 2 vol.)
- England in 1815 and 1845 (1845)
- Free Trade and a Fettered Currency (1847)
- The Military Life of John, Duke of Marlborough (1848)
- Essays; Political, Historical and Miscellaneous (1850, 3 vol.)
  - Vol. I.
  - Vol. II.
  - Vol. III.
- History of Europe from the Fall of Napoleon in 1815 to the Accession of Louis Napoleon in 1852 (1852–1859, 8 vol.)
- The Currency Laws (1859)
- Lives of Lord Castlereagh and Sir Charles Stewart (1861)
- Some Account of My Life and Writings: An Autobiography (1883, 2 vol.)
  - Vol. I.
  - Vol. II.

Articles

- "The Increase of Crime," Blackwood's Edinburgh Magazine, Vol. LV (1844)
- "Causes of Increase of Crime," Blackwood's Edinburgh Magazine, Vol. LVI (1844)
- "Lamartine," Blackwood's Edinburgh Magazine, Vol. LVI (1844)
- "Guizot," Blackwood's Edinburgh Magazine, Vol. LVI (1844)
- "Homer, Dante, and Michael Angelo," Blackwood's Edinburgh Magazine, Vol. LVII (1845)
- "British History during 18th Century," Blackwood's Edinburgh Magazine, Vol. LVII (1845)
- "Virgil, Tasso, and Raphael," Blackwood's Edinburgh Magazine, Vol. LVII (1845)
- "Hannibal," Blackwood's Edinburgh Magazine, Vol. LVII (1845)
- "Marlborough. No. I," Blackwood's Edinburgh Magazine, Vol. LVIII (1845)
- "Montesquieu," Blackwood's Edinburgh Magazine, Vol. LVIII (1845)
- "Humboldt," Blackwood's Edinburgh Magazine, Vol. LVIII (1845)
- "Marlborough. No. II," Blackwood's Edinburgh Magazine, Vol. LVIII (1845)
- "Marlborough. No. III," Blackwood's Edinburgh Magazine, Vol. LIX (1846)
- "The Roman Campagna," Blackwood's Edinburgh Magazine, Vol. LIX (1846)
- "The Fall of Rome," Blackwood's Edinburgh Magazine, Vol. LIX (1846)
- "Marlborough's Dispatches, 1708–1709" Blackwood's Edinburgh Magazine, Vol. LX (1846)
- "The Romantic Drama," Blackwood's Edinburgh Magazine, Vol. LX (1846)
- "Marlborough's Dispatches, 1710–1711" Blackwood's Edinburgh Magazine, Vol. LX (1846)
- "Marlborough's Dispatches, 1711–1712" Blackwood's Edinburgh Magazine, Vol. LX (1846)
- "The British Theatre, Part I," The Dublin University Magazine, Vol. XLVIII (1846)
- "The British Theatre, Part II," The Dublin University Magazine, Vol. XLVIII (1846)
- "Eugene, Marlborough, Frederick, Napoleon, and Wellington," Blackwood's Edinburgh Magazine, Vol. LXI (1847)
- "Lessons from the Famine," Blackwood's Edinburgh Magazine, Vol. LXI (1847)
- "M. De Tocqueville," Blackwood's Edinburgh Magazine, Vol. LXI (1847)
- "Thirty Years of Liberal Legislation," Blackwood's Edinburgh Magazine, Vol. LXIII (1848)
- "Fall of the Throne of the Barricades," Blackwood's Edinburgh Magazine, Vol. LXIII (1848)
- "The Revolution in Europe," Blackwood's Edinburgh Magazine, Vol. LXIII (1848)
- "How to Disarm the Chartists," Blackwood's Edinburgh Magazine, Vol. LXIII (1848)
- "The Navigation Laws," Blackwood's Edinburgh Magazine, Vol. LXIV (1848)
- "Continental Revolutions—Irish Rebellion—English Distress," Blackwood's Edinburgh Magazine, Vol. LXIV (1848)
- "The Year of Revolutions," Blackwood's Edinburgh Magazine, Vol. LXV (1849)
- "Free Trade at its Zenith," Blackwood's Edinburgh Magazine, Vol. LXVI (1849)
- "The Year of Reaction," Blackwood's Edinburgh Magazine, Vol. LXVII (1850)
- "The Ministerial Measures," Blackwood's Edinburgh Magazine, Vol. LXVII (1850)
- "Free-trade Finance," Blackwood's Edinburgh Magazine, Vol. LXVII (1850)
- "Chateaubriand's Memoirs," Blackwood's Edinburgh Magazine, Vol. LXVIII (1850)
- "Ledru Rollin on England," Blackwood's Edinburgh Magazine, Vol. LXVIII (1850)
- "Foreign Affairs," Blackwood's Edinburgh Magazine, Vol. LXVIII (1850)
- "Ancient and Modern Eloquence," Blackwood's Edinburgh Magazine, Vol. LXVIII (1850)
- "The Currency Extension Act of Nature," Blackwood's Edinburgh Magazine, Vol. LXIX (1851)
- "Biography," Blackwood's Edinburgh Magazine, Vol. LXIX (1851)
- "The Dangers of the Country—External," Blackwood's Edinburgh Magazine, Vol. LXIX (1851)
- "The Dangers of the Country—Our Internal Dangers," Blackwood's Edinburgh Magazine, Vol. LXIX (1851)
- "The Dinner to Lord Stanley," Blackwood's Edinburgh Magazine, Vol. LXIX (1851)
- "Æschylus, Shakespeare and Schiller," Blackwood's Edinburgh Magazine, Vol. LXIX (1851)
- "The Census and Free Trade," Blackwood's Edinburgh Magazine, Vol. LXX (1851)

Academic offices
Preceded by John Campbell, 2nd Marquess of Breadalbane	Rector of Marischal College, Aberdeen; 1845 – ?	Succeeded by Patrick Robertson, Lord Robertson
Preceded by Thomas Babington Macaulay	Rector of the University of Glasgow; 1850–1852	Succeeded by Earl of Eglinton
Baronetage of the United Kingdom
New creation	Baronet (of Possil House); 1852 – 1867	Succeeded by Archibald Alison
