= Dorothy Gregory =

Dorothy Gregory may refer to:

- Dorothea Gregory (1754–1830), or Dorothy, lady's companion to Elizabeth Montagu
- Dorothy Lake Gregory (1893–1975), American artist
