= Duncan Gregory =

19th-century Scottish mathematician

Duncan F. Gregory
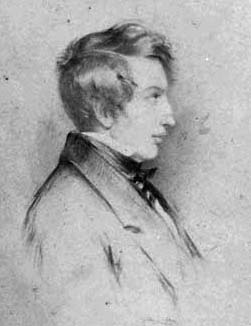
- Born: Duncan Farquharson Gregory; 13 April 1813; Aberdeen, Scotland
- Died: 23 February 1844 (aged 30); Canaan Lodge, Edinburgh

Academic background
- Influences: William Wallace

Academic work
- School or tradition: Trinity College, Cambridge
- Main interests: Mathematician
- Notable works: The Mathematical Writings of D. F. Gregory, M.A.
- Notable ideas: Examples of the Processes of the Differential and Integral Calculus
- Influenced: George Boole

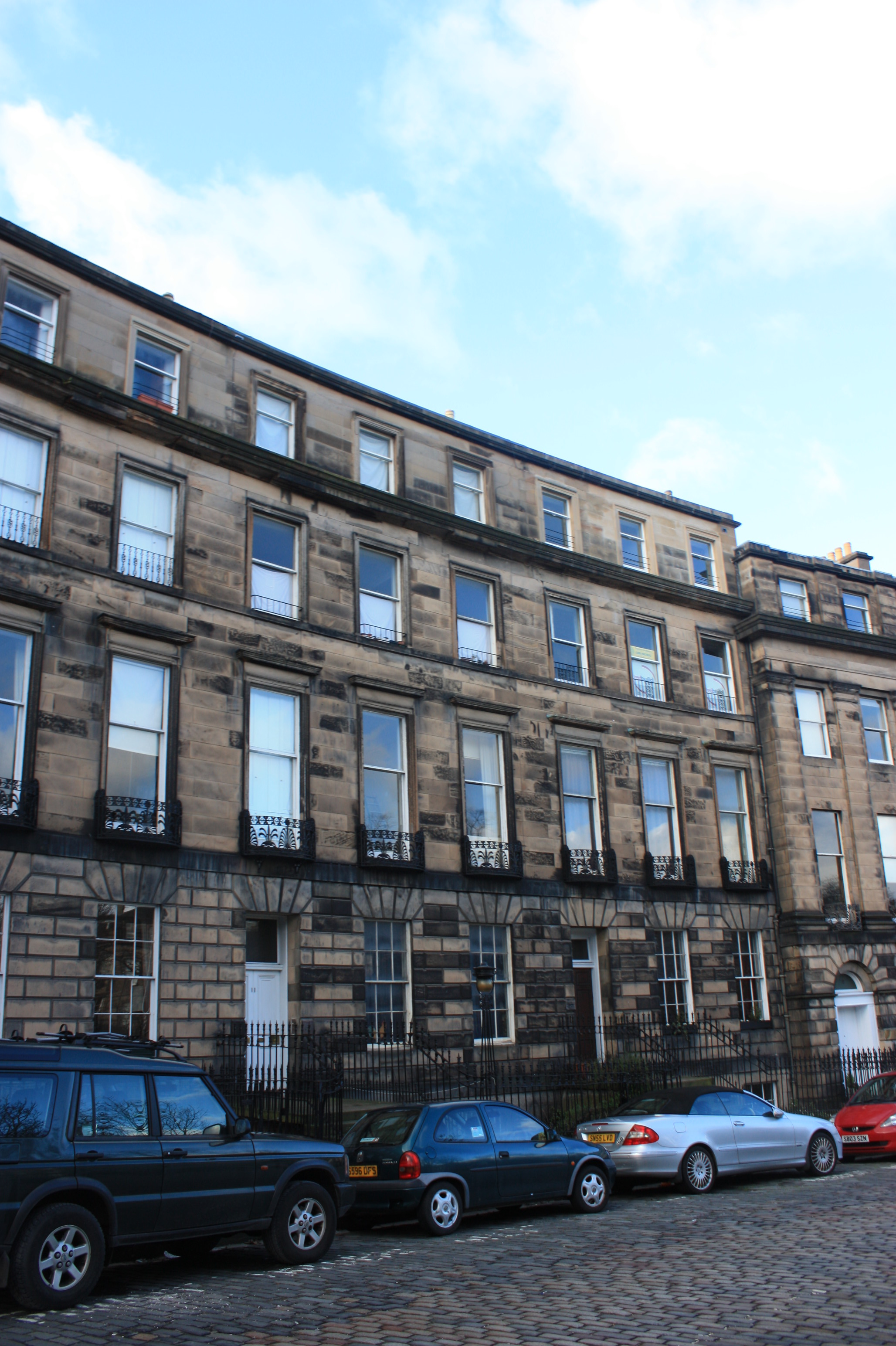
10 Ainslie Place, Edinburgh

Duncan Farquharson Gregory (13 April 1813 – 23 February 1844) was a Scottish mathematician.

== Education ==
Gregory was born in Aberdeen on 13 April 1813, the youngest son of Isabella Macleod (1772–1847) and James Gregory (1753–1821). He was taught initially by his mother, and in October 1825 he was sent to the Edinburgh Academy, and after two years of study spent a winter at a private academy in Geneva. While there his mathematical talent attracted attention, specifically geometry. On his return to Scotland, he attended classes at the University of Edinburgh, working at chemistry, making experiments in polarised light, and advancing in the higher parts of mathematics, guided by Professor Wallace, his mentor. In October 1833 he commenced residence at Trinity College, Cambridge. He earned fifth wrangler in the tripos of 1837. He took the degrees of BA in 1838 and MA in 1841. He was elected fellow of Trinity College in October 1840.

== Mathematics ==
Gregory was initially recognised for his essay The Foundations of Algebra presented to the Royal Society of Edinburgh in 1838. On completing his degrees, he served as Moderator in 1842, examiner through May 1843 and was also appointed assistant tutor. At the suggestion of his friend, Archibald Smith, he founded and was the first editor of the Cambridge Mathematical Journal in November 1837, helped by Robert Leslie Ellis who succeeded him as editor. Many of his articles for the CMJ were collected in The Mathematical Writings of D. F. Gregory, edited by his friend and colleague William Walton. In 1841 he published his Examples of the Processes of the Differential and Integral Calculus, which expanded the earlier work of John Herschel, George Peacock and Charles Babbage to include the mathematics used to describe discontinuities observed in heat transfer explored by the French mathematician Joseph Fourier, and the theory of undulatory light, a topic familiar to him. He was elected a member of the Philological Society 12 May 1843.

== Other disciplines ==
Acting as tutor, Gregory was also an examiner of his college and lectured occasionally in chemistry. Two of his papers explored the physics of pendulums (clockmakers) and were written with Mr. Archibald Smith. (On the Sympathy of Pendulums, See pp. 175–86, Mathematical Writings of D.F. Gregory.)

== Illness and death ==
Gregory's circumstances did not allow him to accept the Mathematical Chair at the University of Toronto offered in 1841. Illness overtook him the next year. Incapacitated, he left Cambridge in the spring of 1843, and died in Edinburgh the following February, at 30 years of age.

Gregory is buried with his siblings in his parents burial plot in the south-west corner of Canongate Kirkyard, next to Adam Smith.

== Family ==
Gregory never married. He was the youngest son of eleven children. His older brother William, like his father, was a chemist and physician. His great-great-grandfather James Gregory, the mathematician, designed the Gregorian telescope. James's nephew, David Gregory, was appointed a professor of mathematics at the University of Edinburgh in 1683.

Gregory lived together with his brothers and their wives in a huge Georgian townhouse, 10 Ainslie Place, on the Moray Estate in the western New Town of Edinburgh, originally their father's house.

== Published works ==
- Presentations made to the Cambridge Philosophical Society.
  1. 'On the real nature of symbolical algebra' – 14 May 1838.
  2. 'On the logarithms of negative quantities' – 26 November 1838.
  3. 'On photogenic drawings' – 22 April 1839
  4. 'On chemical classification' – 6 May 1839
- The Mathematical Writings of D. F. Gregory, M.A., Ed. W. Walton, (Cambridge, 1865).

== See also ==
- Commutative property
- Cyclic quadrilateral
