= Archibald Alison (author) =

Scottish Anglican priest and essayist

Archibald Alison FRS
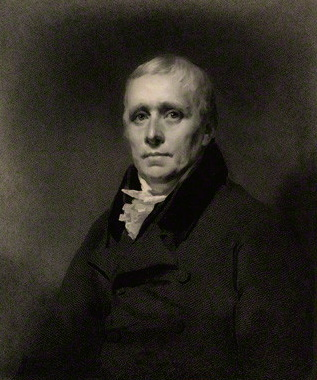
- portrait by William Walker, after Sir Henry Raeburn
- Born: 13 November 1757; Edinburgh, Scotland
- Died: 17 May 1839 (aged 81); Colinton, Edinburgh, Scotland
- Education: University of Glasgow; Balliol College, Oxford
- Occupations: Minister of religion Essayist
- Spouse: Dorothea Gregory (m. 1784) (d. 1830)
- Children: William Pulteney Alison, physician Sir Archibald Alison, advocate
- Relatives: Brother-in-law of the physician James Gregory
- Writing career
- Subjects: didactic and philosophical topics
- Notable works: Essay on the Nature and Principles of Taste (1790)
- Literary movement: Scottish Enlightenment

Archibald Alison FRS FRSE (13 November 1757 – 17 May 1839) was a Scottish Anglican priest and essayist.

== Early life ==
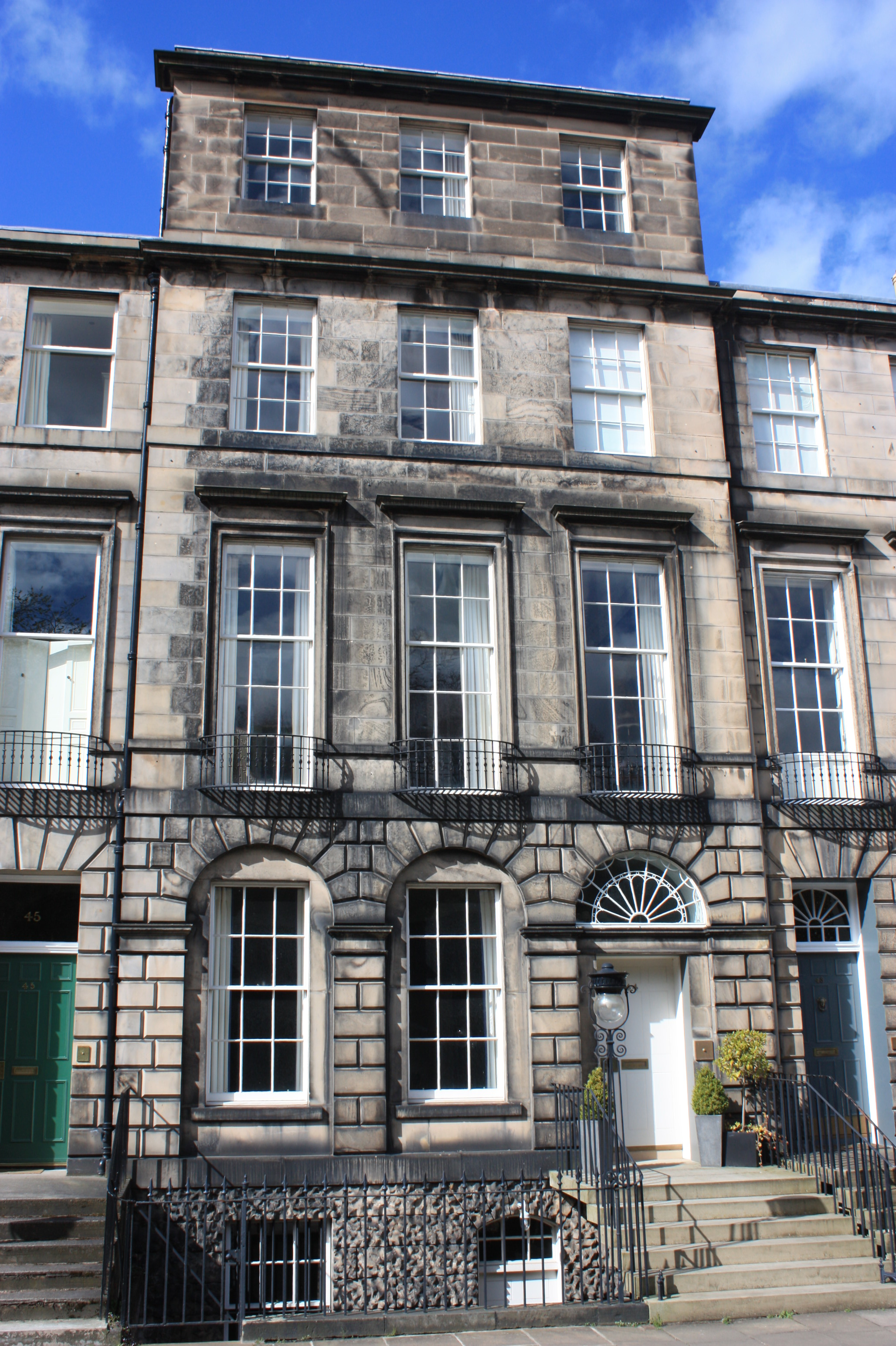
44 Heriot Row, Edinburgh, home of Rev Archibald Alison

He was born in Edinburgh, to Patrick Alison a Edinburgh magistrate, himself a younger son of an Alison of Newhall, near Coupar Angus.

After studying at the University of Glasgow, where he established his lifelong friendship with Dugald Stewart, he studied civil law at Balliol College, Oxford. He was ordained in the Church of England as deacon in 1779 and as priest in 1782. He was appointed in 1778 to the curacy of Brancepeth, near Durham. In 1784 he married Dorothea Gregory, youngest daughter of Professor John Gregory of Edinburgh. She had escaped an arranged marriage designed by her employer Elizabeth Montagu to marry her to her nephew and heir when she met Alison.

== Career ==
The next 20 years of his life were spent in England, where he held in succession the livings of High Ercall, West Lavington, Rodington and Kenley. From 1791 until his death, he held the title of Prebendary to Salisbury Cathedral.

In 1800 he moved back to Edinburgh, having been appointed senior incumbent of episcopalian St Paul's Chapel in the Cowgate. For 34 years he filled this position with much ability; his sermons were characterised by quiet beauty of thought and grace of composition. His preaching attracted so many hearers that a new and larger church was built for him. The new St Paul's Chapel on York Place in Edinburgh's New Town was completed in 1818, and Alison, along with Rev Robert Morehead served as clergy there.

In 1832 he was living at 44 Heriot Row in Edinburgh's city centre. His last years were spent at Colinton near Edinburgh, where he died on 17 May 1839. He was interred at St John's Episcopal Churchyard in Edinburgh.

== Family ==
He married Dorothea Gregory, the sister of James Gregory in 1784. She died in 1830. Their sons included Sir Archibald Alison, 1st Baronet and William Pulteney Alison.

== Works ==
Alison published, besides a Life of Lord Woodhouselee, a volume of sermons, which passed through several editions, and a work entitled Essays on the Nature and Principles of Taste (1790), based on the principle of association of ideas.
