= William Alison =

Scottish physician (1790–1859)

William Pulteney Alison
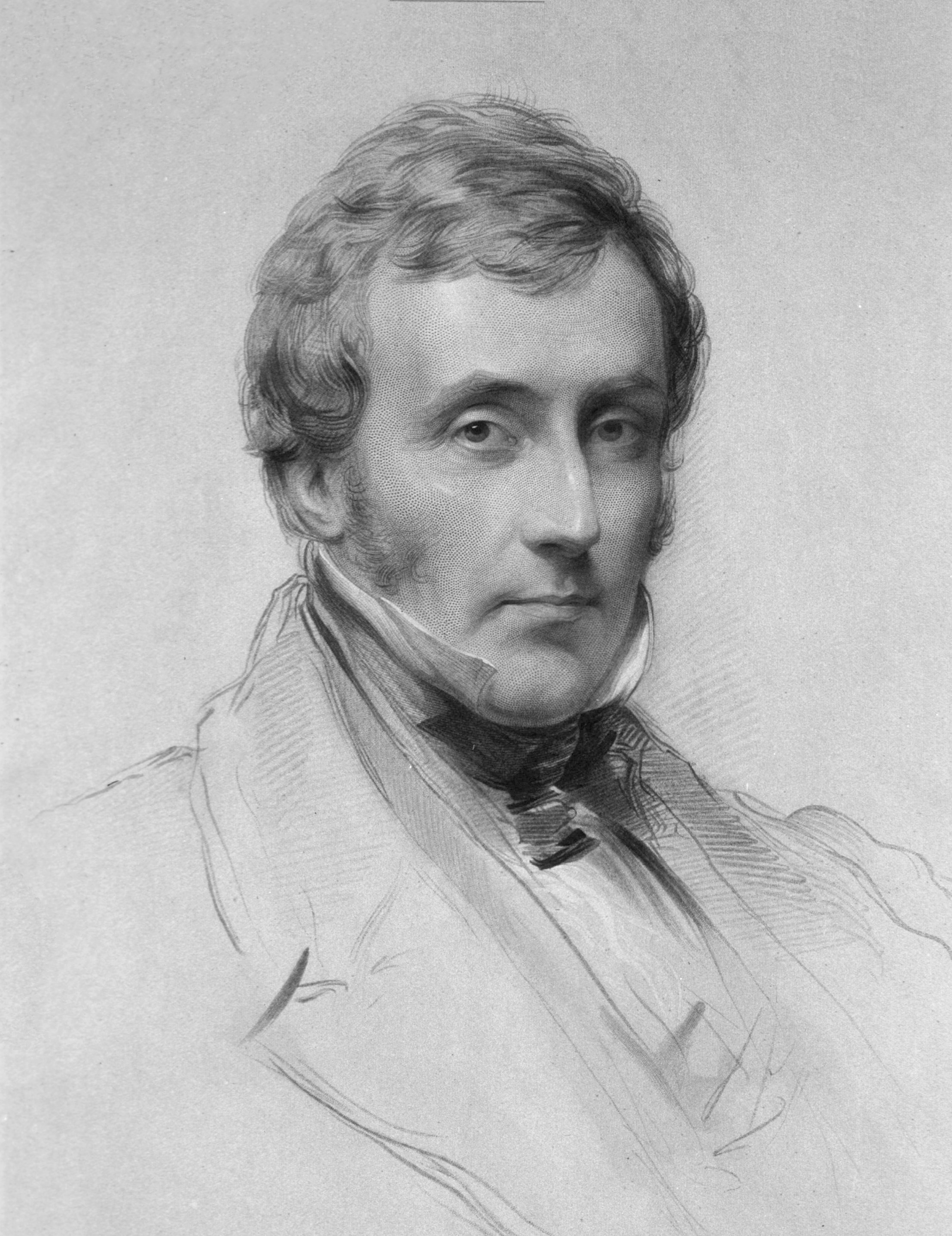
- Born: 12 November 1790; Burghmuirhead, Edinburgh, Scotland
- Died: 22 September 1859 (aged 68); Colinton, Edinburgh, Scotland
- Education: University of Edinburgh (MD 1811)
- Years active: 1814–1858
- Known for: Emphasising the link between poverty and disease. Promoting the idea that there is a 'life force' superadded to the physical forces of dead matter
- Medical career
- Institutions: Physician to the New Town Dispensary (1814); Professor of Medical Jurisprudence, Edinburgh University (1820–1); Professor of the Institutes of Medicine, Edinburgh University (1822–42); Professor of the Theory of Physic, Edinburgh University (1842–56); Physician at the Infirmary; Large private consulting practice

William Pulteney Alison FRSE FRCPE FSA (12 November 1790 – 22 September 1859) was a Scottish physician, social reformer and philanthropist. He was a distinguished professor of medicine at the University of Edinburgh. He served as president of the Medico-Chirurgical Society of Edinburgh (1833), president of the Royal College of Physicians of Edinburgh (1836–38), and vice-president of the British Medical Association, convening its meeting in Edinburgh in 1858.

== Life ==
Alison was born in Boroughmuirhead on 12 November 1790, eldest son of Dorothea Gregory and Reverend Archibald Alison, the elder brother of the advocate Archibald Alison; and godson of Laura Pulteney, 1st Countess of Bath. In his youth he climbed Mont Blanc and other mountains. He entered the University of Edinburgh in 1803, and studied under his father's friend Dugald Stewart, and for a time was expected to follow a career in philosophy rather than medicine. In 1811 he graduated as a physician.

In 1814 he opened the New Town Dispensary at 4 East James Street, at the east end of the city's New Town.

His academic career was impressive. He became a professor of Medical Jurisprudence in 1820. From 1822 to 1842 he lectured in the Institutes of Medicine. From 1842 to 1856 he lectured in the Theory of Physic.

His Edinburgh townhouse was at 43 Heriot Row in the Edinburgh's Second New Town.

In 1821 he was elected a member of the Aesculapian Club. In 1821 Alison was also elected a member of the Harveian Society of Edinburgh and served as president in 1834. He was President of the Royal College of Physicians 1836–8, a Fellow of the Society of Antiquaries, President of the Medico-Chirurgical Society in 1833, and Vice President of the Royal Society of Edinburgh 1842–59.

His uncle was Professor James Gregory and his cousin was Professor William Gregory.

== Ameliorating the lot of the poor ==
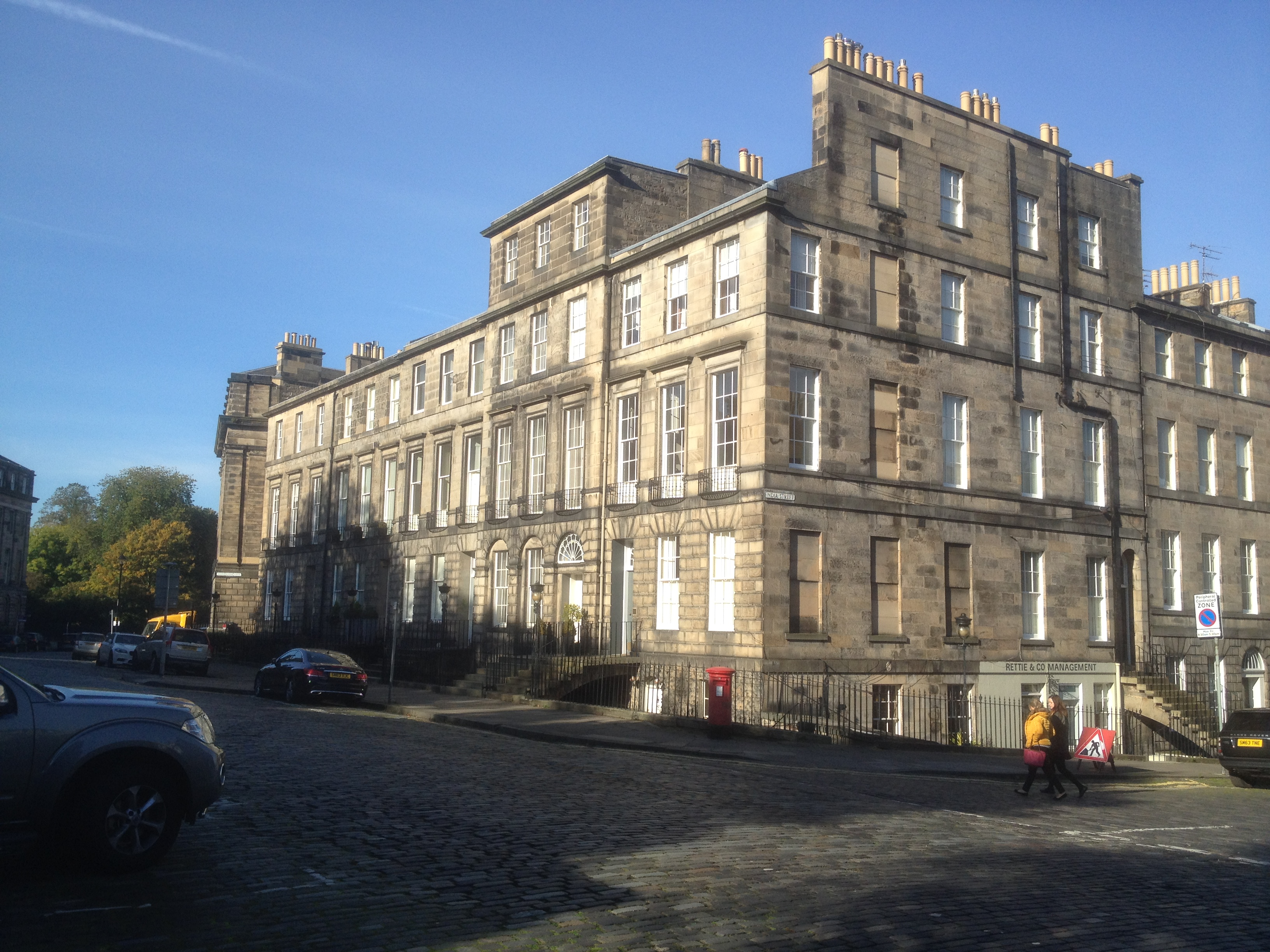
43 Heriot Row, Edinburgh

Struck by the poverty he encountered, Alison advocated poor relief in Scotland be extended from the sick and infirm to include the healthy impoverished. This was a radical suggestion as the ethos of the age was for poor relief to be withheld from the able-bodied destitute who were presumed to be indolent and sinful.

Published in his report on the generation of fever in English reformer Edwin Chadwick's “Report on the sanitary condition of the laboring population,” despite the general feeling of many physicians at the time, Alison was of the opinion that malarias, or diseases, were not a result of putrescent animal and vegetable matters or human excretions, as many medical professionals believed, but rather was convinced that some diseases were “nearly beyond the power of medicine, but the causes of which are known, and under certain circumstances may be avoided; and the conditions necessary for avoiding them are in a great measure in the power of communities, though beyond the power of many of the individuals composing them.”

Alison proposed using the Scottish Poor Law to alleviate poverty as a means of assuaging disease, but the Poor Law Commissioners supported the position of Edwin Chadwick that disease was caused by filth and miasmas. Alison held to the contagion theory of disease, stating its spread was facilitated through poverty and overcrowding. He argued that poverty arose from social factors, not sin and sloth, and that higher wages should be paid to workers to mitigate disease by reducing the effect of overcrowding and destitution. In stating a case for fighting disease that appeared to be outside the province of contemporary medicine Alison was a pioneer of "political" medicine, as well as social epidemiology and public health.

In his 1840 publication Observations on the management of the poor in Scotland and its effect on the health in the great towns, Alison argued that the government and its agencies had a major role in the alleviation of poverty and that this undertaking should not be left to religious groups or private charities. He advocated using public taxes to assist widows, orphans and the unemployed poor, and criticised the establishment for ignoring those who were fit but impoverished. The findings of the 1844 Royal Commission on Poor Laws (Scotland) lent support to Alison's viewpoint. Alison was very critical of the Scottish upper class for not providing what Alison believed to be adequate relief to the impoverished citizens of the country, while praising the English system, which had a long-established legislative framework to maintain minimum standards of relief for those suffering from poverty. Contrary to England's governmental standards, Scotland's system was based around voluntary charity by the wealthier members of society, justified by claiming that legal guarantees of support and relief for the impoverished would remove any motivation for the poor to work out of their situation and would rather create an incentive to stay stagnant as poor in order to receive governmental benefits. Alison counter argued, saying that it was unrelieved poverty that truly lowered the morality of the poor, and not providing any relief not only made the impoverished more prone to contract disease, but also more short-sighted and reckless. There was also no evidence in Alison's mind that the English system of governmental relief had brought any of the negative consequences that the Scottish had attributed to it, and rather “the English people receive a temporal reward for their more humane and merciful management of the poor, in the comparative exemption of most of their great towns from the curse of contagious fever.”

Alison also promoted preventive social medicine and initiated a program to vaccinate children against smallpox, and he established Edinburgh's Fever Board to combat epidemics. He advocated speedy diagnosis of the ill and, where found to be contagious or infectious, he recommended fumigation and ventilation of the residence and prompt hospitalisation for the patient. His methods bore fruit during the cholera epidemic of 1831–1832, whereby Edinburgh took immediate and effective action to mitigate the outbreak without awaiting instructions from London.

In strongly advocating government intervention to alleviate poverty as a means to combat disease, Alison was ahead of his time but he lived to see public opinion move closer to his initiatives.

== Personal life ==
Alison in later life

He married his first cousin Margaret Craufurd/Crawford Gregory (1809–1849), daughter of James Gregory in 1832; the marriage was childless.

Attacks of epilepsy forced him to retire in 1856. He was succeeded by Thomas Laycock. He died at home, "Woodville" in Colinton on 22 September 1859. He was interred at St John's Episcopal Cemetery in Edinburgh.

== Artistic recognition ==
A bust of Alison by William Brodie is held by the Royal College of Physicians of Edinburgh.

== Works ==
- Outlines of physiology (1831)
- Observations on the management of the poor in Scotland and its effect on the health in the great towns. Alison WP. Edinburgh: Blackwood, 1840.
- Obituary notice. The late Dr Alison. Edinburgh Medical Journal 1859; 5:469–86.
- William Pulteney Alison. Pitman J . Proc R Coll Physicians Edinburgh 1989;19:219–24.[Medline]
- History of the Royal College of Physicians of Edinburgh. Craig WS. Oxford: Blackwell Scientific, 1976.
- Observations on the Famine of 1846–47 in the Highlands of Scotland and in Ireland, in Illustrating the Connection of the Principle of Population with the Management of the Poor (1847) W.P. Alison Edinburgh, 1857.
- Remarks on the Report of Her Majesties Commissioners on the Poor Laws of Scotland W. P. Alison, Edinburgh, 1844.
- William Pulteney Alison (1790–1859) a Scottish social reformer. I Milne, Head of Library and Information Services, Royal College of Physicians of Edinburgh. Journal of Epidemiology and Community Health 2004; 58:887. BMJ Publishing Group Ltd

== Sources ==
- Clarke, N., Dorothea Alison (née Gregory) (1754–1830), Oxford Dictionary of National Biography 2004 (Subscription required)
- Jacyna, L.S., William Pulteney Alison (1790–1859), Oxford Dictionary of National Biography 2004 (Subscription required)
