= A Father's Legacy to His Daughters =

Book by Dr. John Gregory

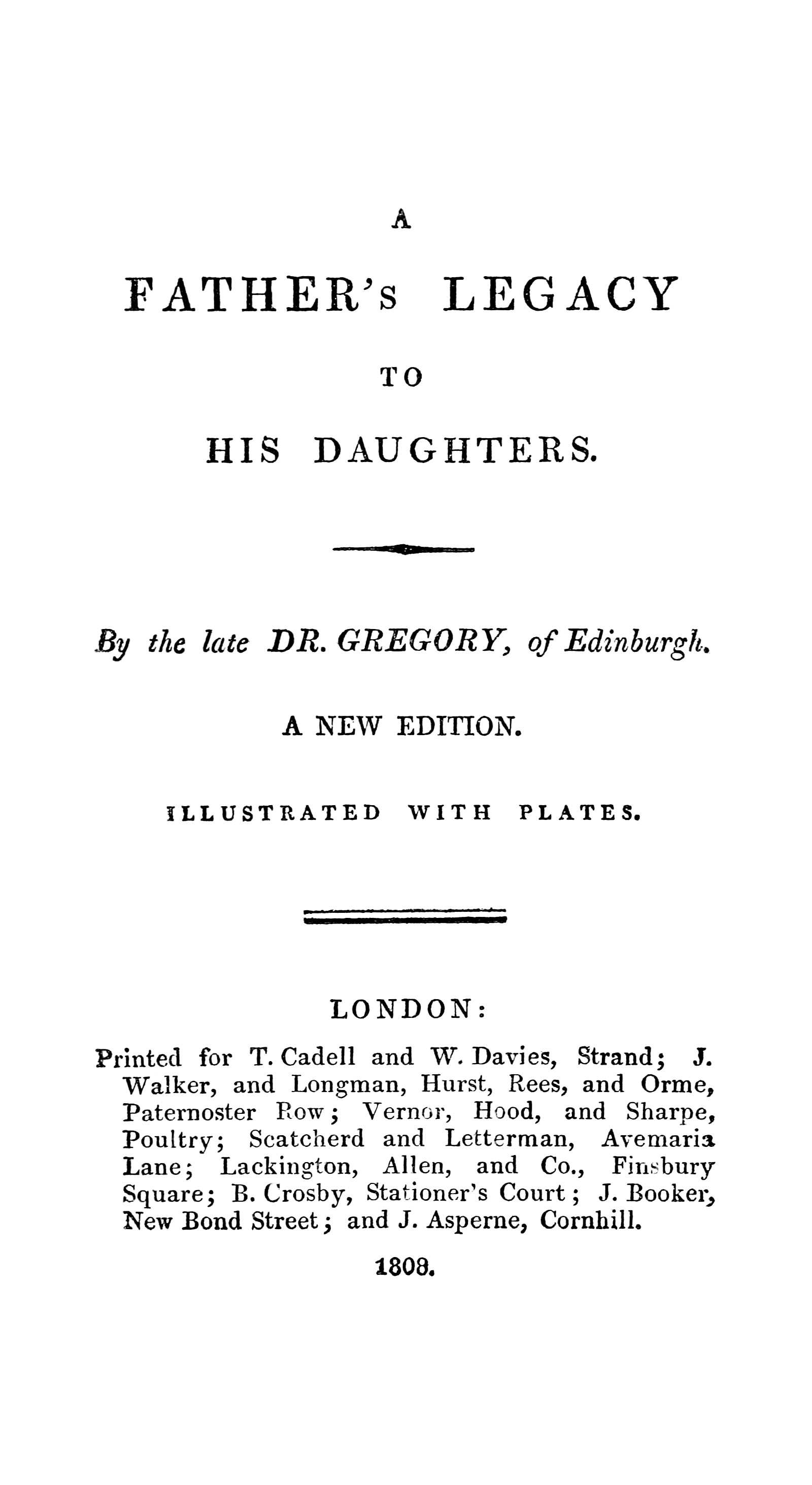
1808 edition frontispiece

A Father's Legacy to his Daughters is a book, written by Dr John Gregory (1724 – 1773), Scottish physician, medical writer and moralist.

Dr Gregory wrote A Father's Legacy to his Daughters after the death of his wife in 1761, in order to honour her memory and record her thoughts on female education. He meant to give the text to his daughters. His son James had it published in 1774; a year following Gregory's death. It became a best-seller, going through many editions and translations. In writing this work, Gregory would have been influenced by the celebrated Bluestocking Elizabeth Montagu. He and his daughters had toured Scotland with Montagu in 1766 and on their return Montago asked that his daughters might stay longer at her home in Northumberland. Montagu considered the daughter's education on philosophy to be simple and Dr Gregory requested that Montagu should draw up a plan for their education. Dorothea would return in about 1770 to be Montagu's companion for ten years and this only ended when Montagu decided to choose her husband.

A Father's Legacy to His Daughters advises parents and women on religion, moral conduct, friendship and interactions with men, with a focus on marriage. He suggested that women should refrain from exposing any learning that they might have, as this would damage their ability to attract a husband. Mary Wollstonecraft would later attack these principles in A Vindication of the Rights of Woman (1792), arguing that Gregory's advice amounted to nothing more than deceit on the part of women.

This book was imported to America, where it also went through several editions and reprints. There was an 1801 edition printed by Warner and Hanna for John Conrad and Company, which was published in Baltimore. While the original text states that "... a woman in this country has very little probability for marrying for love", a footnote in this edition contains commentary on this, which states that "These observations are happily inapplicable in America, although perfectly just in Great Britain."
