= Kenley, Shropshire =

Village in Shropshire, England

Coordinates: 52.601°N 2.648°W

Kenley
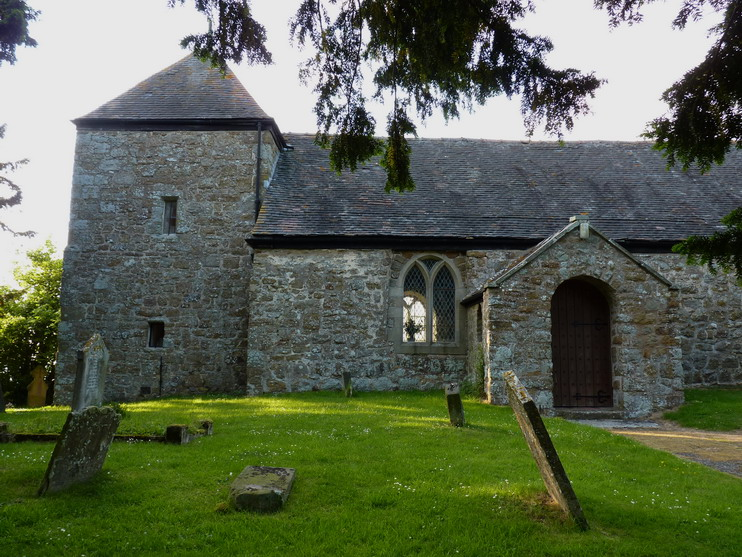
- St John the Baptist church, Kenley

- Location within Shropshire
- Population: 258 (2011)
- OS grid reference: SJ561005
- Civil parish: Kenley
- Unitary authority: Shropshire
- Ceremonial county: Shropshire
- Region: West Midlands
- Country: England
- Sovereign state: United Kingdom
- Post town: SHREWSBURY
- Postcode district: SY5
- Dialling code: 01694
- Police: West Mercia
- Fire: Shropshire
- Ambulance: West Midlands
- UK Parliament: Shrewsbury and Atcham

Kenley is a small village and civil parish in the English county of Shropshire. It is located in remote countryside, atop a ridge at around 180 metres (590 ft) above sea level. It is near the larger villages of Acton Burnell, about three miles to the north-west, and Harley, about two miles to the east. The population of the civil parish at the 2011 census was 258.

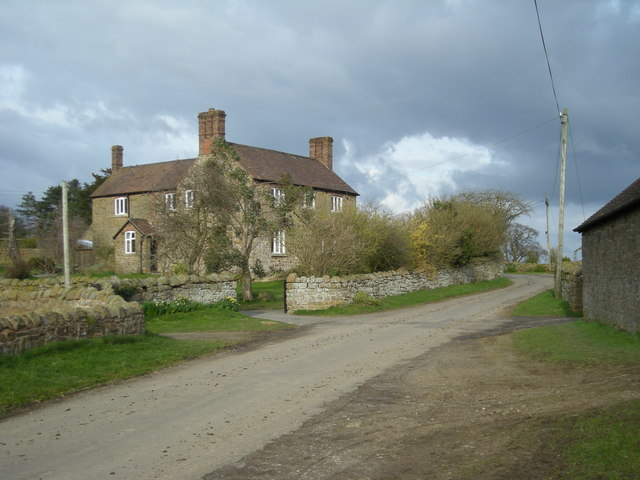
Bowling Green Farm House, Kenley.

The name is probably formed from the Old English personal name Cenna with -ley, meaning a clearing in a wood.

To the west are the hamlets of Ruckley and Langley, which form a separate civil parish.

The historian Archibald Alison and statistician William Farr were born in Kenley.

== Notable people ==
- Archibald Alison, (1757-1839), Scots essayist, onetime parish rector.
- Sir Archibald Alison, 1st Baronet, (1792 at Kenley-1867), historian and advocate, his son
- William Farr, (1807 at Kenley-1883), statistician

== See also ==
- Listed buildings in Kenley, Shropshire
