= Cuthbert Ackroyd =

628th Lord Mayor of London

Sir Cuthbert Ackroyd Bt DL JP FRSA

Lord Mayor of London
- In office 1955–1956

Personal details
- Born: Cuthbert Lowell Ackroyd; 4 September 1892
- Died: 11 April 1973 (aged 80)
- Occupation: Underwriter

Sir Cuthbert Lowell Ackroyd, 1st Baronet (4 September 1892 – 11 April 1973) was the 628th Lord Mayor of London.

== Career ==
The son of Benjamin Bately Ackroyd and Emily Armitage, he attended school in Dewsbury, followed by the University of London.

He gained the rank of captain in the Royal Artillery and fought in the First World War.

In 1940 he was a Common Councillor of the City of London. In 1945 he was an Alderman and Justice of the Peace for the City of London. He was the Visiting Magistrate of Holloway Prison from 1945 to 1955. He served for a year as a Sheriff of the City of London in 1949-50 and as Lord Mayor of London in 1955–56. He was created a Baronet 'of Dewsbury' on 8 May 1956.

In 1956 the University of Leeds awarded him an honorary Doctoral Decree of Law. He was Deputy Lieutenant of Kent (1962) and High Sheriff of Kent for 1964–65. From 1964 to 1967 Sir Cuthbert was the Governor of the Irish Society. He was also a Fellow of the Royal Society of Arts.

== Private life ==
He married Joyce Wallace Whyte, daughter of Robert Whyte, on 14 June 1927, and had two children:

- John Robert Whyte Ackroyd, 2nd Baronet (1932–1995)
- Christopher Lovell Ackroyd (born 1934)

On his death in 1973 he was succeeded in the baronetage by his eldest son.

== Sources ==
- 'ACKROYD, Sir Cuthbert (Lowell)’, Who Was Who, A & C Black, 1920–2007; online edn, Oxford University Press, Dec 2007

Honorary titles
Preceded by Seymour Howard	Lord Mayor of London; 1955–1956	Succeeded by Cullum Welch
Baronetage of the United Kingdom
New creation	Baronet (of Dewsbury); 1956–1973	Succeeded by John Ackroyd
