= Timothy Ackroyd =

English actor

Sir Timothy Ackroyd, Bt
- Born: Timothy Ackroyd; 7 October 1958 (age 68); London, England
- Occupation: Actor
- Years active: 1976–present

Sir Timothy John Robert Whyte Ackroyd, 3rd Baronet (born 7 October 1958), known as Timothy Ackroyd, is an English actor.

Ackroyd was born on 7 October 1958 to Sir John Robert Whyte Ackroyd, 2nd Baronet, and Jennifer Eileen McLeod Bishop.

== Early career ==
Ackroyd's career began in 1976 when he was nominated as Most Promising Newcomer in the West End Theatre Awards for his performance as Clytemnestra in Aeschylus's Agamemnon. His London début was in Bryan Forbes' controversial and hugely successful Macbeth at The Old Vic; his West End debut was starring opposite Peter O'Toole and Joyce Carey as Ricki-Ticki-Tavy in George Bernard Shaw's Man and Superman. Other appearances in the West End include closing down the long-running farce No Sex Please, We're British, Pygmalion with John Thaw, The Rivals playing Sir Anthony Absolute and Jeffrey Bernard Is Unwell appearing beside Peter O'Toole and Tom Conti.

He has also served as a National Theatre player and appeared in weekly repertory at Southwold, Chichester, Harrogate, Farnham, Newbury, Glasgow and Leatherhead. After writing and playing William Hogarth in The Compassionate Satirist in collaboration with Brian Sewell and Peter O'Toole, he decided to take a break from the stage in 2007.

I don't know what acting is and anything I've done in the way of work well achieved is entirely owing to the writers

— Sir Timothy Ackroyd, in

Sir Timothy was generally considered one of the more enigmatic actors of his generation and refused to be interviewed. Peter O'Toole called him "The last of the roaring boys, nothing will hold him at his best, and nothing will wish to hold him at his worst. A throwback certainly, maverick, I could use all the senses used for me, yet at moments here we have genius. A man who lives at times in the darkest recesses of the human condition."

Ackroyd is known to have a deep loathing of the cult of celebrity, chat-shows, contemporary comedy and politicians;

Having grown up with my father John and Peter O'Toole, my mother Jennifer, then to have the luck and fortune to form friendships with Beryl Bainbridge, Patrick Leigh Fermor, Patrick Moore and P.D. James, it is possible to see through the ghastly anaemic form known as celebrity. I occasionally look and wonder if any of these 'celebrities' take a look at themselves and wonder what world they inhabit; it's as fascinating as it is deeply depressing.

— Sir Timothy Ackroyd, in In Conversation with Sir Timothy Ackroyd, August, 2017

In 2003 he represented The British Forces at a service of reconciliation between the Zulu and The British, at the one hundred and twenty fifth anniversary of the Anglo-Zulu War. Ackroyd made a deep and lasting friendship with Prince Shange who spoke on behalf of The Zulu Nation.

== Director ==
He has directed three plays in London; Iphigenia at Aulis by Euripides and Red Lanterns by Alecos Galanos, both adapted and produced by Costas Charalambos Costa as well as Cocteau's Les Parents terribles directed by Sir Timothy himself and designed by Tracey Emin.

== Charities ==
He established the African wildlife charity Tusk Trust in 1989. Tusk is now recognized as one of the leading conservation Trusts in the UK and America, with Prince William as its royal patron. In 2004, Ackroyd's Ark, a book of animal drawings by friends and personalities from all walks of life was published and launched at Christie's and has to this date made £85,000 for Tusk.

Other charities supported are as the Chairman of the Ackroyd Trust which helps drama students entering their final year of training and the establishing of The John Ackroyd Scholarship at the Royal College of Music.

In 2012 he became a Trustee of The Mane Chance Sanctuary.

== One man show ==
Ackroyd has performed his one-man show A Step Out of Time, produced by Dave Allen, to both public and private audiences internationally. A fierce advocate of the spoken word, he gives readings of Saki, Dickens and M. R. James. He starred with John Challis in a live Radio Theatre broadcast of Dracula for Ragamuffin Productions at The National Liberal Club in November 2013.

== Later career ==
In November 2008 Ackroyd performed in Charles Dickens's Ghost story The Signalman with Rodney Bewes.

In 2009 a volume of his poetry entitled Tripe was published. He also narrated Gogol's "Diary of a madman" to the Gogol suite by Schnitke, conducted by Vladimir Jurowski. He played the role of Jolly in the BBC3 production of "Beau Geste" by P.C. Wren.

In 2015 he played Brian Donald Hume in "The Fuse" written by Ackroyd and Dame Beryl Bainbridge, which included a film directed by Edward Andrews and Nic Roeg. He also completed recordings of short stories by Saki and Stacy Aumonier.

More recently Ackroyd recited The Middleham Requiem on the reinterment of the remains of King Richard III and followed this with a recital of all the major speeches from Henry V at St John's Smith Square with The Soloman Orchestra. Michael Gambon described the performance as "breathtaking". In 2016 he recorded for his friend Alexander McCall Smith "My Italian Bulldozer". McCall Smith says of Ackroyd "Listening to an audio book recorded by Tim is always an utter pleasure. My publishers have entrusted several of my books to him and the results have been wonderful. Here is a voice that is rich, fun and immensely expressive".

Baronetage of the United Kingdom
Preceded by John Robert Whyte Ackroyd	Baronet (of Dewsbury); 1995–present	Incumbent
