= Dorothea Gregory =

(1854–1937) British companion to Elizabeth Montagu

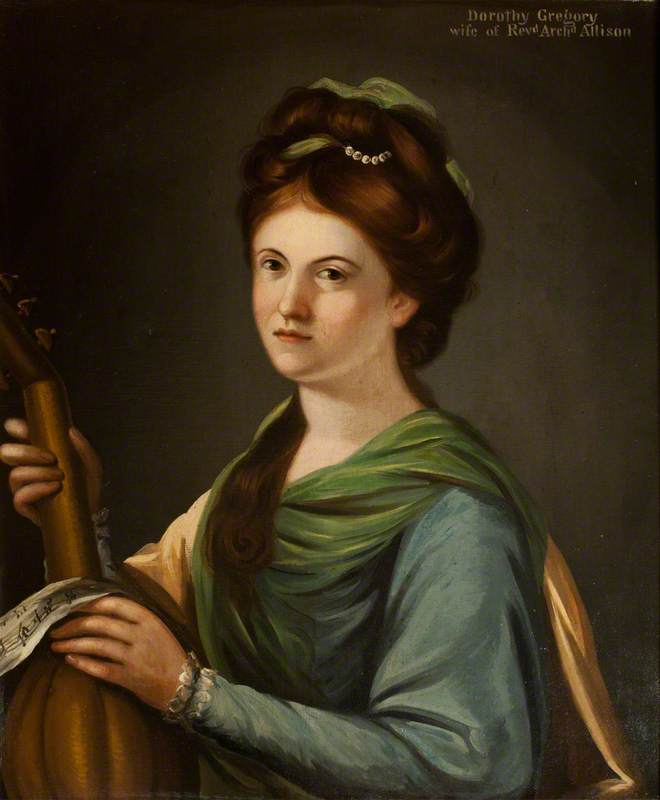
- Baptised: 4 June 1754
- Died: 7 July 1830 (aged 76); Edinburgh
- Spouse: Archibald Alison
- Children: 6, including William Alison, Sir Archibald Alison, 1st Baronet
- Father: John Gregory

Dorothea Gregory (baptised 4 June 1754, died 7 July 1830) was the Lady's companion to the leading intellectual Elizabeth Montagu for a decade. They fell out when Montagu insisted that she marry her nephew and heir. Gregory married another, missing out on the huge fortune that Montagu's nephew inherited.

== Life ==
Gregory was the eldest of the two surviving daughters of Elizabeth (born Forbes) and John Gregory. She was baptised in 1754 in Aberdeen. Her father was a professor of medicine at Edinburgh University.

Her father wrote A Father's Legacy to his Daughters after the death of her mother in 1761. He meant to give the text to his daughters. His son, the physician James Gregory had it published in 1774; a year following his father's death. It became a best-seller, going through many editions and translations. In writing this work, John Gregory would have been influenced by the celebrated bluestocking Elizabeth Montagu. Dorothea, her father and her sister had visited Elizabeth Montagu's house in Northumberland in 1766. The now childless Montagu was captivated by the two girls. The four of them toured Scotland and they met the leading figures in Edinburgh. On their return Montago asked that Dorothy and her sister might stay longer at her home. Montagu considered the daughter's education on philosophy to be simple and Dr Gregory requested that Montagu should draw up a plan for their education. Dorothy would return in 1772 to be Montagu's companion for ten years and this only ended when Montagu decided to choose her husband.

The arrangement was mutually satisfactory as Dorothea took on jobs for Montagu like driving the carriage and being her confidante. Her future seemed secure but she wanted a partner and Montagu was insistent that the only candidate was her nephew. Montagu's husband had died in 1775 and in 1776, she adopted her nephew, the orphan of her brother. Matthew Robinson was named Elizabeth Montagu's heir.

Gregory met a curate named Archibald Alison who was a college friend of her brother Rev. William Gregory. It was 18 months until they married as Montagu was insistent that her husband should have an income. He was promised a living at Sudborough by Sir William Pulteney but this failed to happen promptly. It is speculated that Montagu may have interceded to ensure that the offer went to someone else. They finally married on 19 June 1784 in Northamptonshire. Their six children included the physician William Alison, the historian Sir Archibald Alison, 1st Baronet and Margaret Alison (1798–1881) who married the pro-slavery lawyer William Burge.

== Death ==
Gregory died in 1830. The same year her husband, who died in 1839, retired from St Paul's and St George's Church in Edinburgh.
