= Listed buildings in Kenley, Shropshire =

Kenley is a civil parish in Shropshire, England. It contains nine listed buildings that are recorded in the National Heritage List for England. Of these, one is at Grade II*, the middle of the three grades, and the others are at Grade II, the lowest grade. The parish contains the village of Kenley and the surrounding countryside. The listed buildings consist of a church and its churchyard wall, and houses and cottages in or near the village.

== Key ==
| Grade | Criteria |
|---|---|
| II* | Particularly important buildings of more than special interest |
| II | Buildings of national importance and special interest |

== Buildings ==
| Name and location | Photograph | Date | Notes | Grade |
|---|---|---|---|---|
| St John's Church; 52.60315°N 2.64698°W | | 12th century | The church was restored in about 1854. It is built in gritstone and has a tile roof, and consists of a nave and a chancel in one cell, a south porch, and a west tower. The tower is low, in two stages, and has a pyramidal roof. There are round-arched doorways in the south and north walls, the latter blocked, and a doorway with a pointed arch in the tower. | II* |
| The Old Post Office; 52.60342°N 2.64657°W | — | 16th century (probable) | The cottage, at one time a post office, has been extensively altered and extended. Originally timber framed with cruck construction, it has largely been replaced in gritstone, and has a tile roof. There is one storey and an attic, two bays, and an extension to the right. The windows are casements with segmental heads, and there is a gabled eaves dormer. Inside, one cruck truss has survived. | II |
| Weavers Thatch; 52.59854°N 2.65182°W | — | Mid 16th century (probable) | A cottage that was altered later, it is in gritstone, and has a thatched roof with coped stone verges to the right gable. There is one storey and an attic, and three bays. On the front is a gabled stone porch, above which is an eyebrow dormer. Inside is an inglenook fireplace. | II |
| Kenley Hall; 52.60238°N 2.64611°W | — | 1639 | A manor house, later a farmhouse, it is in gritstone with red sandstone dressings and a tile roof. There are two storeys, attics and a sub-basement, three bays, and a later rear wing. On the front is a gabled porch, the windows are mullioned, and there is a gabled dormer. Inside are timber framed cross-walls. | II |
| Bowling Green Cottage; 52.59570°N 2.65506°W | — | 17th century | A timber framed cottage with plaster infill and a thatched roof. The right gable end and the rear wall have been encased in limestone and gritstone. There is one storey and an attic, three bays, and a lean-to on the left. The windows are casements, and there is an eyebrow dormer. | II |
| Edge View; 52.60146°N 2.64714°W | — | 17th century | Originally a squatter's cottage, it has been altered and extended. The early part is timber framed with red brick infill, the extensions are in gritstone, and it has a tile roof. There is one storey and an attic, originally one bay, with a bay added to the right in the 18th century, when the front wall was also rebuilt. On the front is a gabled porch, the windows are casements, and there are two gabled dormers. | II |
| New Hall; 52.58844°N 2.64271°W | — | 17th century (probable) | A farmhouse that was remodelled in about 1774, and altered and extended in the 19th century. It is timber framed on a red brick plinth, the extension to the rear is in red brick, and the roof is tiled. There are two storeys and an attic, and a T-shaped plan. On the front is a round-arched gabled porch and a canted bay window, and the other windows are casements. | II |
| Walnut Cottage; 52.58023°N 2.65338°W | — | 17th century | Originally a squatter's cottage, it has been considerably altered and extended. The early part is timber framed with plaster and brick infill, this has been largely rebuilt and extended in gritstone, and the roof is tiled. There is one storey and an attic; originally with one bay, a range has been added at right angles. There is a gabled wooden porch, most of the windows are casements, and there is a gabled dormer. | II |
| Churchyard wall 52.60327°N 2.64705°W | — | Late 18th or early 19th century (probable) | The wall surrounds the churchyard of St John's Church, and is in gritstone and conglomerate with a maximum height of 2 metres (6 ft 7 in). The churchyard has an oval shape, but the wall on the south side is missing. | II |
