= William Aykroyd =

English woollen and carpet manufacturer

Sir William Aykroyd Bt OStJ
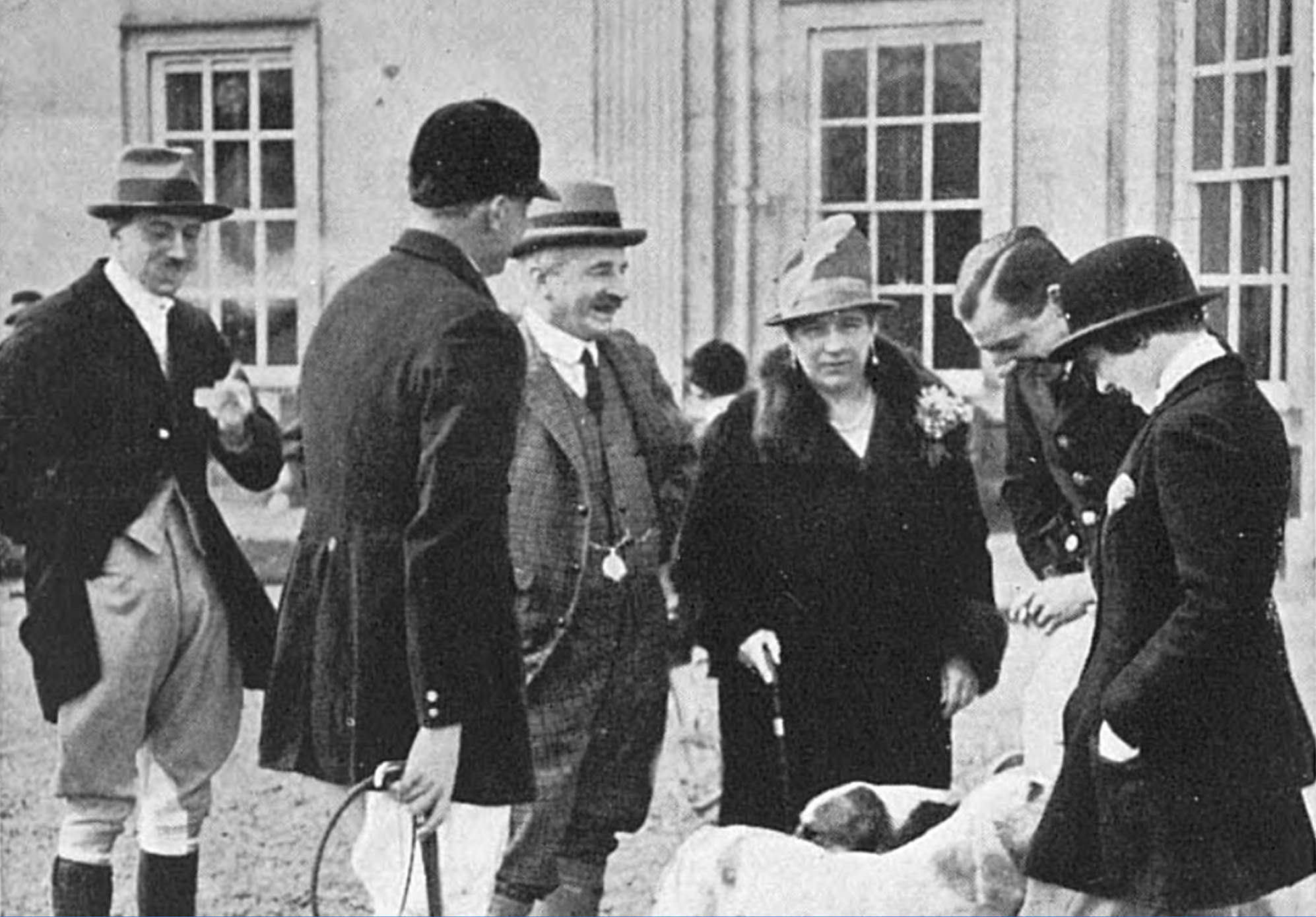
- Sir William and Lady Aykroyd at Grantley Hall, 1927
- Born: William Henry Aykroyd; 8 May 1865; West Riding of Yorkshire, England
- Died: 3 April 1947 (aged 81); Yorkshire
- Occupations: Woollen and carpet manufacturer

Sir William Henry Aykroyd, 1st Baronet, OStJ (8 May 1865 – 3 April 1947) was an English woollen and carpet manufacturer.

He was born in the West Riding of Yorkshire, the son of Alfred Aykroyd and Ellen (née Milnes), and educated at Thorp Arch Grange, near Wetherby. He entered his uncle's woollen and carpet manufacturing business, T. F. Firth & Sons Ltd, at Brighouse, and later became chairman. He was also chairman of Hammond's Bradford Brewery and managing director of the Bradford Dyers' Association.

He was created a baronet in the 1920 Birthday Honours. He was appointed High Sheriff of Yorkshire in 1926.

He was succeeded in the baronetcy by his eldest son, Major Alfred Hammond Aykroyd.

== Footnotes ==
Baronetage of the United Kingdom
New creation	Baronet (of Birstwith Hall); 1920–1947	Succeeded by Alfred Aykroyd
