= Aykroyd baronets =

Baronetcy in the Baronetage of the United Kingdom

There have been two baronetcies created for persons with the surname Aykroyd, both in the Baronetage of the United Kingdom for members of the same family.

The Aykroyd Baronetcy, of Lightcliffe in the West Riding of the County of York, was created in the Baronetage of the United Kingdom on 16 June 1920 for William Henry Aykroyd. He was a Director of T. F. Firth & Sons, Ltd, and served as High Sheriff of Yorkshire in 1926. His eldest son, the second Baronet, was a Major in the Royal Field Artillery and served as High Sheriff of Yorkshire in 1952. Until 2007 the title was held the latter's son, the third Baronet, who succeeded in 1965. After his death the baronetcy devolved upon his cousin, who was succeeded by his son in 2010.

The Aykroyd Baronetcy, of Birstwith Hall in Hampsthwaite in the County of York, was created in the Baronetage of the United Kingdom 23 March 1929 for Frederick Alfred Aykroyd. He was a merchant and served as high sheriff of Yorkshire from 1941 to 1942. Aykroyd was the first cousin of the first Baronet of the 1920 creation. As of 2007 the title is held by his grandson, the third Baronet, who succeeded his uncle in 1993.

The seat of this branch of the family is Birstwith Hall, near Harrogate, North Yorkshire.

== Aykroyd baronets, of Lightcliffe (1920) ==
Escutcheon of the Aykroyd baronets of Lightcliffe

- Sir William Henry Aykroyd, 1st Baronet (1865–1947)
- Sir Alfred Hammond Aykroyd, 2nd Baronet (1894–1965)
- Sir William Miles Aykroyd, 3rd Baronet (1923–2007)
- Sir Michael David Aykroyd, 4th Baronet (1928–2010)
- Sir Henry Robert George Aykroyd, 5th Baronet (born 1954)

The heir apparent to the baronetcy is George Jack Aykroyd (born 1977). His heir-in-line is his eldest son Fynn Aykroyd (born 1999).

== Aykroyd baronets, of Birstwith Hall (1929) ==
Escutcheon of the Aykroyd baronets of Birstwith Hall

- Sir Frederic Alfred Aykroyd, 1st Baronet (1873–1949)
- Sir Cecil William Aykroyd, 2nd Baronet (1905–1993)
- Sir James Alexander Frederic Aykroyd, 3rd Baronet (born 1943)

The heir presumptive is the present holder's half-brother Toby Nigel Bertram Aykroyd (born 1955). There are no further heirs to the title.

== See also ==
- Ackroyd baronets
