= Ackroyd baronets =

Baronetcy in the Baronetage of the United Kingdom

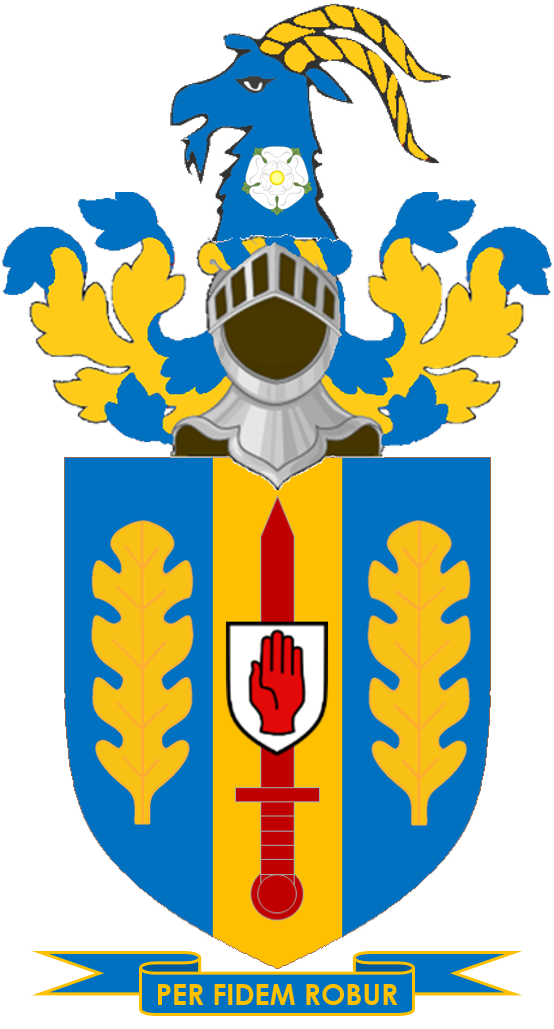
Arms: Azure on a Pale between two Oak Leaves Or a Sword erect Gules; Crest: A Goat's Head erased Azure armed Or charged on the neck with a Rose Argent barbed and seeded proper; Motto: Per fidem robur (Strength through faith)

The Ackroyd Baronetcy, of Dewsbury in the West Riding of the County of York, is a title in the Baronetage of the United Kingdom. It was created on 5 July 1956 for Cuthbert Ackroyd, Lord Mayor of London between 1955 and 1956.

As of 2010 the title is held by his grandson and noted actor Timothy Ackroyd, the third Baronet, who succeeded his father in 1995.

== Ackroyd baronets of Dewsbury, Yorkshire (1956) ==
- Sir Cuthbert Lowell Ackroyd, 1st Baronet (1892–1973)
- Sir John Robert Whyte Ackroyd, 2nd Baronet (1932–1995)
- Sir Timothy John Robert Whyte Ackroyd, 3rd Baronet (born 1958)

The heir presumptive is the present holder's brother Andrew John Ackroyd (born 1961).

== See also ==
- Aykroyd baronets
