= Sir Archibald Alison, 2nd Baronet =

British Army general (1826–1907)

General Sir Archibald Alison GCB Bt
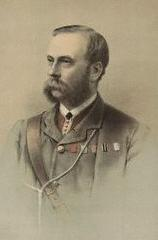
- General Sir Archibald Alison
- Born: 21 January 1826; Edinburgh
- Died: 5 February 1907 (aged 81); London
- Military career
- Allegiance: United Kingdom
- Branch: British Army
- Rank: General
- Commands: Highland Brigade; Deputy Adjutant-General in Ireland (1874–1877); Staff College (1878); Intelligence Department at the War Office (1878–1882); British Troops in Egypt; Aldershot Division; Military Member of the Council of India (1889)
- Conflicts: Crimean War; Indian Mutiny; Battle of Tel el-Kebir; Anglo-Ashanti wars
- Awards: Knight Grand Cross of the Order of the Bath

General Sir Archibald Alison, 2nd Baronet, GCB (21 January 1826 – 5 February 1907) was a Scottish soldier who achieved high office in the British Army in the 1880s. He was a descendant of the Alison family presented by Francis Galton in Hereditary Genius (1869) as an example of genius inherited over several generations.

== Military career ==
Born on 21 January 1826, in Edinburgh, the son of Archibald Alison, the advocate and historian, and educated at the University of Glasgow, and the University of Edinburgh Alison was commissioned into the 72nd Regiment of Foot in 1846. He went on to serve at the Siege of Sevastopol during the Crimean War in 1855.

He served as military secretary to Sir Colin Campbell during the Indian Mutiny in 1857, losing an arm at the relief of Lucknow, and was appointed a Companion of the Order of the Bath (CB). He was appointed assistant adjutant general in the office of the inspector general of infantry in 1862, assistant adjutant general for the South Western District in 1864 and assistant adjutant general at Aldershot in 1870. In 1873 Alison was given command of the British brigade in West Africa during the Anglo-Ashanti wars and fought at the Battle of Amoaful.

He went on to be deputy adjutant general in Ireland in 1874, commandant of the Staff College, Sandhurst in February 1878 and deputy quartermaster general, intelligence, in May 1878. He commanded the Highland Brigade during the Battle of Tel el-Kebir in September 1882. In late 1882 he was appointed general officer commanding British Troops in Egypt and in 1883 he became GOC for Aldershot District.

He was given the colonelcy of the Essex Regiment in 1896, transferring to be colonel of the Seaforth Highlanders in 1897, a position he held until his death.

Alison was promoted to Knight Commander of the Order of the Bath (KCB) in 1874, and further raised to Knight Grand Cross (GCB) in 1887.

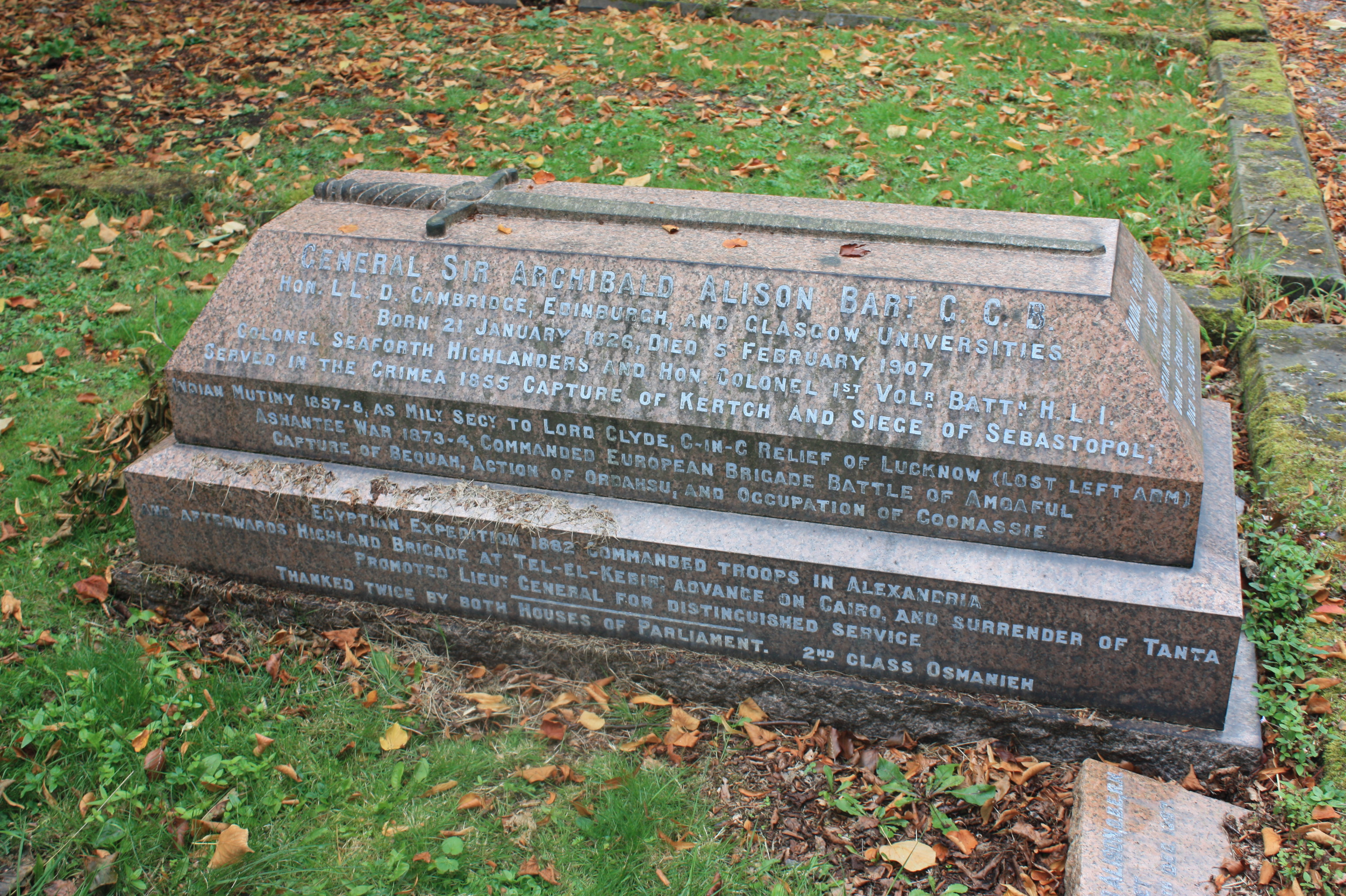
Grave of Sir Archibald Alison (1826–1907), Dean Cemetery

He died on 5 February 1907 and is buried at Dean Cemetery in Edinburgh.

== Family ==
In 1858 he married Jane Black. They had two sons and four daughters.

Military offices
Preceded by Edward Hamley	Commandant of the Staff College, Sandhurst; February–May 1878	Succeeded by Charles Creagh-Osborne
Preceded by Sir Daniel Lysons	GOC-in-C Aldershot Command; 1883 – 1889	Succeeded by Sir Evelyn Wood
Baronetage of the United Kingdom
Preceded by Archibald Alison	Baronet (of Possil House); 1867–1907	Succeeded by Archibald Alison
