= Alison baronets =

Extinct baronetcy in the Baronetage of the United Kingdom

- Creation date: 1852
- Status: extinct
- Extinction date: 1970
- Seat(s): Possil House
- Motto: Vincit veritas, Truth prevails
- Arms: azure, a bear's head muzzled gules, between in chief two fleurs-de-lis or, and in base firtree eradicated, of the last

There has been one Alison Baronetcy.

== Alison of Possil House, Devon ==
- Sir Archibald Alison, 1st Baronet (1792–1867)
- Sir Archibald Alison, 2nd Baronet (1826–1907)
- Sir Archibald Alison, 3rd Baronet (1862–1921)
- Sir Archibald Alison, 4th Baronet (1888–1967)
- Sir Frederick Black Alison, 5th Baronet (1893–1970)

== Sources ==
- This page incorporates information from Leigh Rayment's Baronetage Page which has further dates on it, not shown above.
