= John Gregory (moralist) =

Scottish physician and moralist (1724–1773)

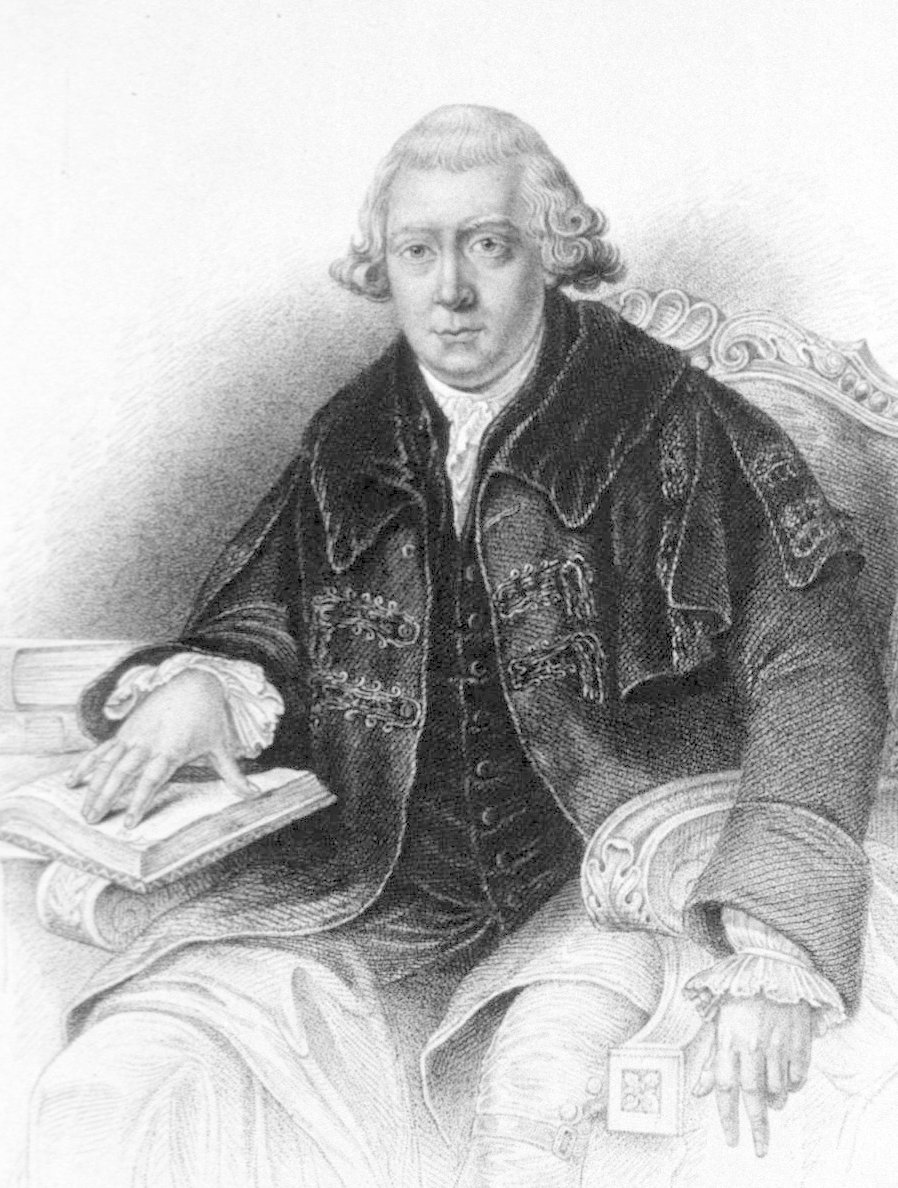
- John Gregory
- Born: 3 June 1724
- Died: 9 February 1773 (aged 48); Edinburgh
- Education: King's College, Aberdeen University of Edinburgh
- Occupations: Scottish physician, medical writer and moralist
- Spouse: Elizabeth Forbes (m. 1752)
- Children: 5, including James Gregory, Dorothea Gregory

John Gregory (3 June 1724 – 9 February 1773), a.k.a. John Gregorie, was an eighteenth-century Scottish Enlightenment physician, medical writer and moralist.

== Life ==
Gregory was born in Aberdeen, Scotland to the professor of medicine James Gregorie and Anna Chalmers, his father's second wife; his grandfather was the distinguished mathematician and astronomer James Gregory. Following the death of his father when he was eight years old, Gregory's education was conducted by Principal Chalmers, his grandfather, and his half-brother James, a professor of medicine. His cousin Thomas Reid, the moral philosopher, also guided and influenced his education. Gregory attended a local grammar school and later King's College, University of Aberdeen. In 1742 he and his mother moved to Edinburgh where he studied medicine. There he became friends with the physician and poet Mark Akenside. Gregory went to Leiden to continue his studies in 1745. In 1746, soon after receiving his degree, he was appointed professor of philosophy at King's College. He taught mathematics and moral and natural philosophy. He was also a practising doctor and preferring patients to lecturing, he resigned his academic post in 1749.

On 2 April 1752, Gregory married Elizabeth Forbes. Together they had three sons, including the physician James Gregory. Their two daughters included Dorothea Gregory who was a companion to the leading blue stocking Elizabeth Montagu. In 1754 the family moved to London and they entered the social circle of John Wilkes, Charles Townshend, George Lyttelton and Elizabeth Montagu. It was at this time that he started spelling his name "Gregory" rather than "Gregorie". In 1756 he was elected a fellow of the Royal Society. Gregory subsequently returned to Aberdeen to take up another academic post.

While at Aberdeen, Gregory attempted to institute a series of medical lectures, but there were too few medical students to sustain them. He also became an active member of Aberdeen Philosophical Society which he had co-founded with 5 others including Prof Robert Trail. The paper he presented there were later collected and published anonymously in A Comparative View of the State and Faculties of Man, with those of the Animal World (1765). Gregory believed in a universal human nature that could be discovered through scientific experiment. The most important elements of human nature, as he saw it, were reason and instinct. He wrote that "the task of improving our nature, of improving man's estate, involves the proper development and exercise of the social principle and the other principle of instinct, with reason subordinate to instinct and serving as a corrective on it". Studying the natural world leads to a cultivation of good taste and religious understanding for Gregory.

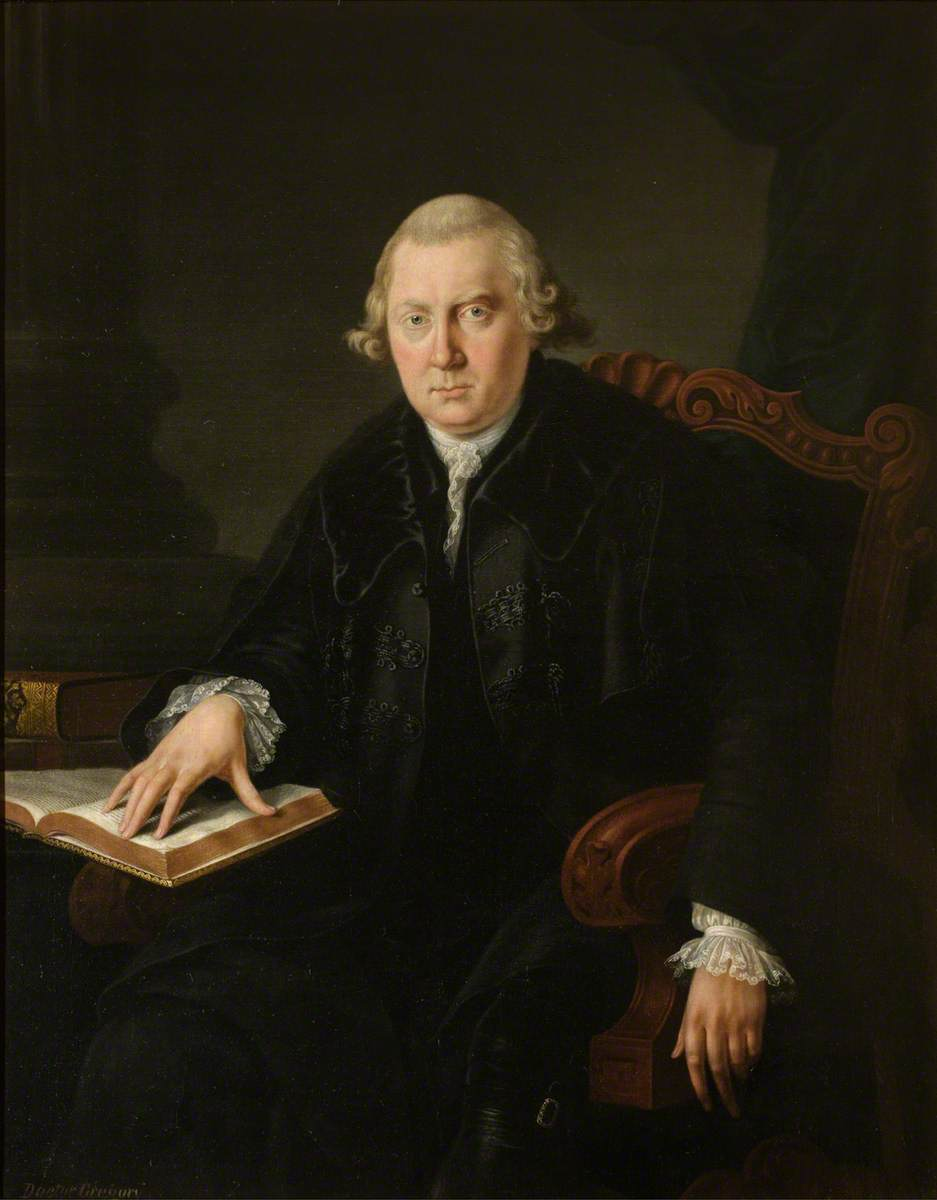
Portrait of Dr John Gregory, painted by George Chalmers.

In what would become his most famous publication, Gregory wrote A Father's Legacy to his Daughters after the death of his wife in 1761 to honour her memory and record her thoughts on female education. Originally Gregory meant only to give the text to his daughters, but his son James published it in 1774; it became a best-seller, going through many editions and translations. In writing this work, he would have been influenced by the celebrated Bluestocking Elizabeth Montagu. She had advised on his daughter's education at his request in 1766. The text advises parents and women on religion, moral conduct, friendship and interactions with men, with a focus on marriage. He suggested that women refrain from exposing any learning that they might have, as this would damage their ability to attract a husband. Mary Wollstonecraft would later attack these principles in A Vindication of the Rights of Woman (1792), arguing that Gregory's advice amounted to nothing more than deceit on the part of women.

Gregory moved to Edinburgh in 1764, where he established a medical practice. Two years later Gregory was appointed the first physician in Scotland to George III and made a member of the faculty of Edinburgh University. His appointment was not undisputed and one professor resigned because Gregory was selected rather than William Cullen. Between 1767 and 1769, Gregory gave a series of lectures on medicine and in 1769, he and Cullen gave joint sources on medical practice and medical theory. He published some of his lectures as Observations on the Duties and Offices of a Physician and on the Method of Prosecuting Enquiries in Philosophy (1770). These writings have been called "the first philosophical, secular medical ethics in the English language". Gregory also published Elements of the Practice of Physic (1772), which investigated the nosology of disease and the diseases of children.

Gregory died in Edinburgh on 9 February 1773. He is buried in Canongate Churchyard but the plot bears only the name of his son, James, also a prominent doctor and Professor of Medicine. The latter was famed for creating "Gregory's Powder" and "Gregory's Mixture", both frequently used for stomach complaints until World War I.

Elizabeth Montagu wrote of John: "The hours I passed in his company were amongst the most delightful in my life. He was instructive and amusing, but was much more; one loved Dr Gregory for the sake of virtue and virtue (one might almost say) for the sake of Dr Gregory."
