= Gregory (surname) =

Origin
- Origin: Greek, Latin, Celtic, Russian
- Meaning: Son of "Gregory" or "Gregor"
- Region of origin: England (Derbyshire), Scotland (Highlands)

Other names
- Variant forms: McGregor, MacGregor, Gregor

Gregory is an English, Scottish and Slovenian surname, variants of the name include McGregor, MacGregor, Gregor, Gregson, Gregg, Grigg, Greig and may refer to:

- Adam Gregory (singer-songwriter) (born 1985), Canadian entertainer
- Adam Gregory (actor)
- Alyse Gregory (1884–1967), American suffragist and writer
- André Gregory (born 1934), French-American theatre director, writer and actor
- Andrew Gregory (disambiguation), multiple people
  - Andrew Gregory (British Army officer) (born 1957), British Army officer
  - Andrew Gregory (footballer) (born 1976), English footballer
  - Andrew Gregory (journalist), British journalist
- Andy Gregory, English rugby player
- Anthony Gregory (born 1981), American anarcho-libertarian
- Anthony Karl Gregory (born 1966), Icelandic football player
- Audrey Gregory, Jamaican healthcare administrator
- Augustus Charles Gregory, Australian explorer
- Benjamin Gregory (decathlete) (born 1990), British decathlete
- Benji Gregory (1978–2024), American actor
- Bernard Gregory, French physicist, CERN Director General
- Bill Gregory (born 1949), American football player
- Bob Gregory (disambiguation), multiple people
  - Bob Gregory (comics) (1921–2003), American comics artist and writer
  - Bob Gregory (cricketer) (1902–1973), English cricketer
  - Bob Gregory (politician) (born 1936), Australian politician
  - Bob Gregory (American football) (born 1963), player and coach
- Brad Stephan Gregory (born 1963), American historian
- Bud Gregory (1926–2016), Canadian politician
- Caspar René Gregory (1846–1917), German theologian
- Celia Gregory (1949–2008), British actress
- Charles Hutton Gregory (1817–1898), British civil engineer
- Christine Gregory (1879–1963), British sculptor
- Claiborne Gregory (1920–2006), American politician from Virginia
- Colin Gregory (John Colin Gregory, 1903–1959), British tennis player
- Conal Gregory (born 1947), British politician
- Cory Gregory (born 1975), American educator from California
- Cynthia Gregory (born 1946), American ballerina
- Dave Gregory, Australian cricketer
- Dave Gregory, guitarist for XTC
- David Gregory (mathematician), Scottish mathematician
- David Gregory-Kumar, BBC journalist
- David Gregory, American journalist
- David Gregory, English footballer
- Deborah Gregory, American author of The Cheetah Girls
- Derek Gregory (born 1951), British geographer
- Derrick Gregory (1949–1989), English drug smuggler, hanged in Malaysia
- Dick Gregory (1932–2017), American comedian, social activist, writer, and entrepreneur
- Dorian Gregory (born 1971), American actor
- Doris Gregory, Canadian author
- Dudley S. Gregory (1800–1874), American politician from New Jersey
- Duncan Farquharson Gregory (1813–1844), Scottish mathematician
- Earle Davis Gregory (1897–1972), American WWI Medal of Honor recipient
- Ed Gregory (1931–2022), American basketball scout, coach, and executive
- Edward John Gregory (1850–1909), British painter
- Eric Gregory (disambiguation), multiple people
- Francis Gregory, American naval captain, eponym of two ships named USS Gregory
- Francis Thomas Gregory (1821–1888), Australian explorer and politician
- Frederick D. Gregory (born 1941), USAF pilot and NASA astronaut
- Garland Gregory (1919–2011), American football player
- Gayson Gregory, Antiguan and Barbudan football player
- Geena Gregory, fictional character
- Glenn Gregory (born 1958), English singer and songwriter
- Herbert B. Gregory, Virginia judge
- Herbert E. Gregory, American geologist and geographer
- Horace Gregory (1898–1982), American poet, critic and academic
- Howard Gregory (footballer) (1893–1954), British football player
- Howie Gregory (1886–1970), American baseball player
- Irene Gregory, American aerospace engineer
- Ivey William Gregory, American politician from Georgia
- Jack Gregory (disambiguation), multiple people
  - Jack Gregory (cricketer) (1895–1973), Australian cricketer
  - Jack Gregory (American football guard) (1915–2003), American football player
  - Jack Gregory (sprinter) (1923–2003), British sprinter
  - Jack Gregory (footballer, born 1925) (1925–2008), played for Southampton and Leyton Orient
  - Jack Gregory (footballer, born 1926) (1926–1995), played for West Ham United and Scunthorpe United
  - Jack Gregory (American football coach) (1927–2014), for East Stroudsburg, Villanova, and Rhode Island
  - Jack I. Gregory (born 1931), USAF general
  - Jack Gregory (defensive end) (1944–2019), American footballer
- Jackson Gregory (1882–1943), American teacher, journalist, and writer.
- James Gregory (disambiguation), multiple people
  - James Gregory (mathematician) (1638–1675), Scottish mathematician and astronomer
  - James Gregory (physician) (1753–1821), Scottish physician
  - James Gregory (mineralogist) (1832–1899), Scottish mineralogist
  - James Gregory (actor) (1911–2002), American actor
  - James Gregory (prison officer) (1941–2003), South African prison guard, author of Goodbye Bafana
  - James Gregory (comedian) (1946–2024), American comedian
  - James Crawford Gregory (1801–1832), Scottish physician
  - James G. Gregory (1843–1932), Surgeon General of Connecticut and member of the Connecticut House of Representatives
  - James Monroe Gregory (1849–1915), professor of Latin and dean at Howard University
- Jecon Gregory a nomadic artist
- Jim Gregory (basketball), American basketball player
- Jim Gregory (football chairman) (1928–1998), English football club director and chairman
- Jim Gregory (footballer) (1876–1949), Australian footballer
- Jim Gregory (ice hockey) (1935–2019), Canadian ice hockey manager
- Jim Gregory (politician) (elected 2018), American politician from Pennsylvania
- John Gregory (disambiguation), multiple people
  - John Walter Gregory (1864–1932), British geologist
  - John Gregory (cricketer, born 1887) (1887–1914), Hampshire cricketer
  - John Gregory (cricketer, born 1842) (1842–1894), English cricketer
  - John Gregory (American football coach) (1938–2022), American football coach
  - John Gregory (footballer) (born 1954), English football player and coach
- Johnny Gregory (footballer) (1905–1992), Australian footballer
- Jonathan M. Gregory, British climate modeler
- Joseph Gregory (disambiguation), multiple people
  - Joseph T. Gregory (1914–2007) American paleontologist
  - Joseph M. Gregory (born 1952), American banker with Lehman Brothers
  - Joseph Gregory (sniper) (1900–1971), Canadian sniper in both World Wars
- Joe Gregory (trade union leader) (1862–1926), stonemason
- Joshua Gregory (1790–1838), pioneer in Western Australia
- Julius Gregory (born 1988), American football player
- Ken Gregory (born 1960), Canadian media artist
- Kossen Gregory (1922–2019), American politician from Virginia
- Lee Gregory (baseball) (born 1938), pitcher
- Lee Gregory (footballer) (born 1988), for Mansfield Town
- Lewis Gregory (born 1992), English cricketer
- Louis George Gregory, Hand of the Cause in the Bahá'í Faith
- Masten Gregory (1932−1985), American racing driver
- Matt Gregory (hiker) (born 1978), American walker for cancer charity
- Matthew Gregory (disambiguation), several people
  - Matthew Gregory (deacon) (1680–1777), member of the Connecticut House of Representatives from Norwalk
  - Matthew Gregory (attorney) (born 1968), Northern Mariana Islands Attorney General
  - Matthew Gregory (speaker), speaker of the House of Assembly of Jamaica, 1705–1706
  - Matthew Gregory (died 1779) (1693–1779), planter and politician in Jamaica
- Maundy Gregory (1877–1941), British theatre producer and self-declared spy
- Melissa Gregory, American figure skater
- Michael Gregory (actor), American actor born Gary Meimar
- Mike Gregory (1964–2022), English professional rugby league footballer
- Natalie Gregory (fl. 1983–1990), American child actor
- Ned Gregory Edward James Gregory (1839–1899), Australian cricketer
- Noble Jones Gregory (1897–1971), Democrat politician, representing Kentucky
- Nuala Gregory, New Zealand artist and academic
- Olinthus Gregory, English mathematician
- Paul Gregory (disambiguation), several people
- Paul Gregory (baseball) (1908–1999), Major League pitcher and college coach
  - Paul Gregory (lighting designer) (born 1952), president and founder of Focus Lighting
  - Paul Gregory (producer) (1920–2015), American film and theatre producer
  - Paul R. Gregory (born 1949), English fantasy artist
  - Paul Roderick Gregory, professor of Economics, University of Houston, Texas
  - Paul Gregory (squash player) (born 1968), English athlete
- Philip Herries Gregory (1907–1986), British mycologist and phytopathologist
- Philippa Gregory, Kenyan-English writer
- Richard Gregory (1923–2010), British psychologist
- Robert Gregory (disambiguation), several people
- Robert Gregory (RFC officer) (William Robert Gregory, 1881–1918), Irish cricketer and artist
- Roberta Gregory (born 1953), American comic book writer and artist
- Roger Gregory, American judge
- Roger Gregory (programmer), pioneer of hypertext
- Ross Gregory (1916–1942), Australian Test cricketer
- Sara Beth Gregory, Kentucky judge and politician
- Scott Gregory (disambiguation)
  - Scott Gregory (ice skater) (born 1959), American ice dancer
  - Scott Gregory (golfer) (born 1994), English golfer
  - Scott Gregory (rugby union) (born 1999), New Zealand sportsman
- Stephanie A. Gregory, legal name of pornographic film actress Stormy Daniels
- Stephen Gregory (disambiguation)
  - Stephen S. Gregory (1849–1920), Chicago lawyer
  - Stephen Gregory (author) (born 1952), Welsh horror writer

- Stephen Gregory, executive with the newspaper The Epoch Times

  - Steve Gregory (born 1945), English jazz saxophonist and composer
  - Steve Gregory (American football) (born 1983)
  - Steven Gregory (born 1987), English football midfielder
- Susanna Gregory, pseudonym of Elizabeth Cruwys, writer of detective fiction
- Syd Gregory (1870–1929), Australian cricketer
- Thea Gregory (1926–2022), British actress
- Theodore Gregory (1890–1970), British economist
- Thomas Watt Gregory (1861–1933), American Attorney General
- Tom Gregory (radio and TV announcer) (1927–2006), American TV and radio personality
- Tom Gregory (producer) (born 1960), American entertainer and commentator
- Tom Gregory (swimmer) (born 1976), long-distance swimmer as a child
- Tommy Gregory (born 1972), Republican politician from Florida
- Tony Gregory (disambiguation)
  - Tony Gregory (1947–2009), Irish independent politician
  - Tony Gregory (footballer) (1937–2021), English player and coach
- Troy Gregory (born 1966), American singer, songwriter, musician, filmmaker
- T. Ryan Gregory, Canadian scientist
- Vicki L. Gregory, American library scientist
- Victoria, Lady Welby-Gregory (1837–1912), British philosopher, musician and watercolourist
- Walter E. Gregory (1857–1918), American physician
- Wendell Gregory (born 2006), American football player
- Will Gregory (born 1959), English musician and record producer
- William Gregory (disambiguation)
  - William D. Gregory (1825–1904), American clipper ship captain, later a Union Navy commander
  - William G. Gregory (born 1957), USAF lieutenant colonel and NASA astronaut
  - William Henry Gregory (1817–1892), Anglo-Irish politician, MP for Dublin and County Galway
  - William King Gregory (1876–1970), American zoologist
  - William S. Gregory (1825–1887), mayor of Kansas City
  - William Voris Gregory (1877–1936), US attorney and Democrat politician from Kentucky
  - William Gregory (1625–1696), English MP for Hereford and Weobley, Speaker of the House of Commons
  - William Gregory (fl. 1406), MP for Guildford
  - William Gregory (lord mayor) (c.1400–1467), lord mayor of London
  - William Gregory (mayor) (1896–1970), mayor of Lower Hutt, New Zealand
  - William Gregory (Rhode Island governor) (1849–1901), American governor
  - William Gregory (Carmelite) (fl. 1520), Scottish Carmelite
  - William Gregory (chemist) (1803–1858), Scottish chemist
  - William Gregory (Chief Justice), British jurist and first Chief Justice of Quebec
  - William Gregory (civil servant) (1762–1840), Irish senior civil servant
- Wilton Daniel Gregory (born 1947), American cardinal, Archbishop of Washington

In England the surname is well represented in Derbyshire, Lincolnshire, Northamptonshire, Hampshire, Lancashire, Cheshire and Yorkshire, in Scotland the surname is well represented in Lanarkshire, Angus, Aberdeenshire, Moray, Fife, and Midlothian, and in the United States the surname is well represented in Tennessee, Kentucky, North Carolina, South Carolina, Michigan, Ohio and Virginia.

== See also ==
- Gregory (disambiguation)
- Gregor (surname)
- Izabella Grzegory, Polish physicist
- Krikorian
