= Gregor (surname) =

Gregor is a surname, and notable people with the surname include:

- A. James Gregor (1929–2019), professor of political science known for his writings on fascism and security issues
- Bob Gregor (born 1957), American football player
- Čestmír Gregor (1926–2011), Czech composer
- Francis Gregor (MP) (1760–1815), MP for the County of Cornwall, brother of William
- Gréta Gregorová (born 2001), Slovak politician
- Joseph Gregor, (1888-1960), Austrian writer, theater historian and librettist
- Kurt Gregor (1907–1990), German socialist politician
- Michael Gregor (1888—1953), aircraft engineer
- Noah Gregor (born 1998), ice hockey player
- Valentin Gregor (born 1963), jazz violinist, singer and composer
- Walter Gregor (1825–1897), folklorist
- William Gregor (1761–1817), British clergyman and mineralogist who discovered the elemental metal titanium, brother of Francis
- Gregor (musician) (1898–1971), Armenian bandleader

== See also ==
- Gregor, given name
- Gregory (surname)
