= John Gregory =

John or Johnny Gregory may refer to:

== Sportspeople ==
- John Gregory (cricketer, born 1887) (1887–1914), Hampshire cricketer
- John Gregory (cricketer, born 1842) (1842–1894), English cricketer
- Colin Gregory (John Colin Gregory, 1903–1959), British tennis player
- Jack Gregory (American football coach) (1927–2014), college football head coach for East Stroudsburg, Villanova, and Rhode Island
- John Gregory (American football coach) (1938–2022), American football coach
- John Gregory (footballer) (born 1954), English footballer and coach
- Johnny Gregory (footballer) (1905–1992), Australian footballer

== Others ==
- John Gregory (scholar) (1607–1646), English orientalist
- John Gregory (settler) (1612–1689), founding settler of Norwalk, Connecticut
- John Gregory (moralist) (1724–1773), Scottish physician and writer
- John Munford Gregory (1804–1884), governor of Virginia, United States, 1842–1843
- John Gregory (engineer) (1806—c. 1848), English engineer and member of Franklin's Lost Expedition
- John Milton Gregory (1822–1898), first President of the University of Illinois at Urbana-Champaign, United States, 1867–1880
- John Gregory (poet) (1831–1922), trade unionist and Bristol's 'poet cobbler'
- John Walter Gregory (1864–1932), British geologist and explorer
- John Duncan Gregory (1878–1951), British diplomat dismissed for speculation in foreign currencies
- John Gregory (politician) (1878–1955), Canadian member of Parliament
- John Gregory (sculptor) (1879–1958), American sculptor
- John F. Gregory (1927–2009), optical worker and creator of the Gregory-Maksutov telescope design
- John M. Gregory (businessman), American former CEO of King Pharmaceuticals, Inc. in the 1990s
- John Gregory (bandleader) (1924–2020), English bandleader who often recorded under the name "Chaquito"
- John Gregory (priest), Anglican priest
- John S. Gregory, Australian professor of Chinese history

== See also ==
- Jack Gregory (disambiguation)
