= James Gregory =

James or Jim Gregory may refer to:

== Law and politics ==
- James J. H. Gregory (1827–1910), American politician and educator
- James G. Gregory (1843–1932), American politician and Surgeon General of Connecticut
- Jim Gregory (politician) (elected 2018), American politician from Pennsylvania

== Science and medicine ==
- James Gregory (mathematician) (1638–1675), Scottish mathematician and astronomer
- James Gregory (physician) (1753–1821), Scottish physician
- James Crawford Gregory (1801–1832), Scottish physician
- James Gregory (mineralogist) (1832–1899), Scottish mineralogist

== Sports ==
- Jim Gregory (footballer) (1876–1949), Australian rules footballer
- Jim Gregory (football chairman) (1928–1998), English football club director and chairman
- Jim Gregory (ice hockey) (1935–2019), Canadian hockey general manager and league executive
- Jim Gregory (basketball) (born 1949), American basketball player

== Others ==
- James Monroe Gregory (1849–1915), American professor of Latin and dean at Howard University
- James Gregory (actor) (1911–2002), American actor
- James Gregory (prison officer) (1941–2003), South African prison guard, author of Goodbye Bafana
- James Gregory (comedian) (1946–2024), American comedian
- James Gregory (historian), British historian
