= Jack Gregory =

Jack Gregory may refer to:

- Jack Gregory (cricketer) (1895–1973), Australian cricketer
- Jack Gregory (American football guard) (1915–2003), American football player for the University of Alabama, University of Chattanooga and Cleveland Rams
- Jack Gregory (sprinter) (1923–2003), British sprinter
- Jack Gregory (footballer, born 1925) (1925–2008), English football full back for Southampton and Leyton Orient
- Jack Gregory (footballer, born 1926) (1926–1995), English football inside forward for West Ham United and Scunthorpe United
- Jack Gregory (American football coach) (1927–2014), college football head coach for East Stroudsburg, Villanova, and Rhode Island
- Jack I. Gregory (born 1931), general in the United States Air Force
- Jack Gregory (defensive end) (1944–2019), American football defensive end

== See also ==
- John Gregory (disambiguation)
