= Howard Gregory =

Howard Gregory may refer to:

- Howard Gregory (bishop), bishop of the Anglican Diocese of Jamaica
- Howard Gregory (footballer) (1893–1954), English footballer
- Howie Gregory (1886–1970), Major League Baseball pitcher
