= William Gregory =

William Gregory may refer to:

== Politicians ==
- William Gregory (1625–1696), English MP for Hereford and Weobley, Speaker of the House of Commons
- William Gregory (died 1616), MP for Nottingham
- William Gregory (fl. 1406), MP for Guildford
- William Gregory (lord mayor) (c.1400–1467), lord mayor of London
- William Gregory (mayor) (1896–1970), mayor of Lower Hutt, New Zealand
- William Gregory (Rhode Island governor) (1849–1901), American governor
- William Henry Gregory (1817–1892), Anglo-Irish politician, MP for Dublin and County Galway
- William S. Gregory (1825–1887), mayor of Kansas City
- W. Voris Gregory (1877–1936), US congressman from Kentucky
- Ivey William Gregory, known as Bill, American politician from Georgia

== Sports ==
- Bill Gregory (born 1949), former American football defensive lineman
- Robert Gregory (RFC officer) (William Robert Gregory, 1881–1918), Irish cricketer and artist

== Others ==
- Will Gregory (born 1959), British musician with Goldfrapp
- William Gregory (Carmelite) (fl. 1520), Scottish Carmelite
- William Gregory (chemist) (1803–1858), Scottish chemist
- William Gregory (Chief Justice), British jurist and first Chief Justice of Quebec
- William Gregory (civil servant) (1762–1840), Irish senior civil servant
- William D. Gregory (1825–1904), American clipper ship captain, later a Union Navy commander
- William G. Gregory (born 1957), NASA astronaut
- William King Gregory (1876–1970), American zoologist
