= Joseph Gregory =

Joe or Joseph Gregory may refer to:

- Joseph T. Gregory, paleontologist
- Joseph M. Gregory, banker
- Joseph Gregory (sniper)
- Joe Gregory (trade union leader)
