= Richard Gregory (disambiguation) =

Richard Gregory (1923–2010) was a British psychologist.

Richard or Dick Gregory may also refer to:

- Sir Richard Gregory, 1st Baronet (1864–1952), British astronomer
- Richard Gregory (rower) (1890–1925), Canadian Olympic rower
- Richard I. Gregory, professor at Harvard Medical School
- Dick Gregory (Richard Claxton Gregory, 1932–2017), American comedian and civil rights activist
- Dick Gregory (Canadian football) (Richard Allen Gregory, born 1929), Canadian football player
