= Tony Gregory (disambiguation) =

Tony Gregory (1947–2009) was an Irish independent politician.

Tony or Anthony Gregory may refer to:

- Anthony Gregory (born 1981), American anarcho-libertarian
- Anthony Karl Gregory (born 1966), Icelandic football striker
- Tony Gregory (footballer) (1937–2021), English football player and coach

== See also ==
- Gregory Tony (born 1978), American sheriff
- Grégory Tony (born 1978), French kickboxer and boxer
