= Matthew Gregory =

Matthew Gregory may refer to:

- Matthew Gregory (deacon) (1680–1777), member of the Connecticut House of Representatives from Norwalk
- Matthew Gregory (attorney) (born 1968), former Northern Mariana Islands Attorney General
- Matt Gregory (hiker) (born 1978)
- Matthew Gregory (speaker), speaker of the House of Assembly of Jamaica, 1705–1706
- Matthew Gregory (politician, died 1779) (1693–1779), planter and politician in Jamaica
