= Harry Gregory (Australian footballer) =

Australian rules footballer, born 1902

Personal information
- Full name: Harold Valentine Gregory
- Born: 12 November 1902
- Died: 8 January 1993 (aged 90)
- Original team: North Melbourne Juniors
- Height: 173 cm (5 ft 8 in)
- Weight: 71 kg (157 lb)

Playing career^{1}
Years	Club	Games (Goals)
1924–30	Essendon	89 (0)
- ^{1} Playing statistics correct to the end of 1930.

Harry 'Speed' Gregory (12 November 1902 – 8 January 1993) was an Australian rules footballer who played for Essendon in the Victorian Football League (VFL) during the 1920s.

As a half back flanker, Gregory appeared in all of Essendon's three finals in the one off round robin series which decided the 1924 premiership. He finished his career in the Victorian Football Association where he took the field for Coburg from late in the 1930 season until 1933. Gregory also had two brothers who played in the VFL: Bruce Gregory, and Johnny Gregory. His daughter married Ray Watts.
