= E. P. Bottley =

British geologist and businessman

Edward Percival Bottley (10 January 1904 – 8 February 1980) was an English geologist and businessman.

With his wife, Winifred, Bottley founded a geological dealership in Derby, England around 1928 which dealt largely in microscope slides. Bottley made 113 illustrations in colour and black and white.

In the 1930s, the couple took over Gregory's. They expanded the firm to supply museums, universities and private collectors, supplying quality gemstones and minerals to their good friend Alfred Lyndhurst Pocock the renowned London based Fabergé carver, in turn the Bottley's amassed a large collection of Pocock's work that they displayed and exhibited in the course of their work. They also enjoyed the friendship of Charles Vyse, The Chelsea Potter and in the course of their business were acquainted with many prominent figures, royalty and Hollywood celebrities such as Cary Grant who often frequented the Aladdins Cave that was the Gregory Bottley and Co Showroom, upstairs at 30 Old Church St, Chelsea.

Their work carried on during the second world war but they also served their country and community as fire watchers at Chelsea Old Church, near their business premises, it was here that 2 members of their staff, Sidney Simms and Fred Winter, together with several of their firewatch friends were tragically killed in an air raid whilst covering the Bottley's shift while they were on a stock collecting expedition to North Wales, they immediately returned to London and after the war they put their efforts to help rebuild the Church, they would continue their worship there for the remainder of their lives.

E. P. Bottley died in 1980. Winifred carried on the business for a short time after his death, passing it to Brian Lloyd who carried the business onward, keeping the company name and the incumbent staff at the request of Winifred Bottley, Winifred died in 2006 aged 99 years,
