= Jim Gregory (footballer) =

Australian rules footballer (1876–1949)

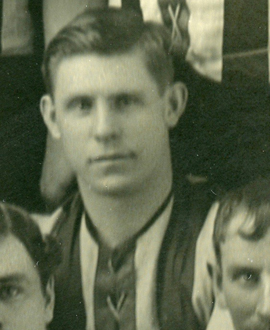
- Gregory in 1901

Personal information
- Full name: James Grant Gregory
- Born: 13 February 1876; Ballarat, Victoria
- Died: 14 May 1949 (aged 73); Malvern East, Victoria
- Original team: Ballarat
- Height: 180 cm (5 ft 11 in)
- Weight: 77 kg (170 lb)
- Position: Rover

Playing career^{1}
Years	Club	Games (Goals)
1896	Collingwood (VFA)	9 (4)
1897–01	Collingwood (VFL)	47 (17)
- ^{1} Playing statistics correct to the end of 1901.

Jim Gregory (13 February 1876 – 14 May 1949) was an Australian rules footballer who played with Collingwood in the Victorian Football League (VFL).

== Family ==
The son of George Gregory (1839-1911), and Christina Gregory (1846-1910), née Mcpherson, James Grant Gregory was born at Ballarat, Victoria on 3 February 1876.

He married Honora "Nora" O'Connor (1874-1948), in Perth, Western Australia on 24 November 1905.

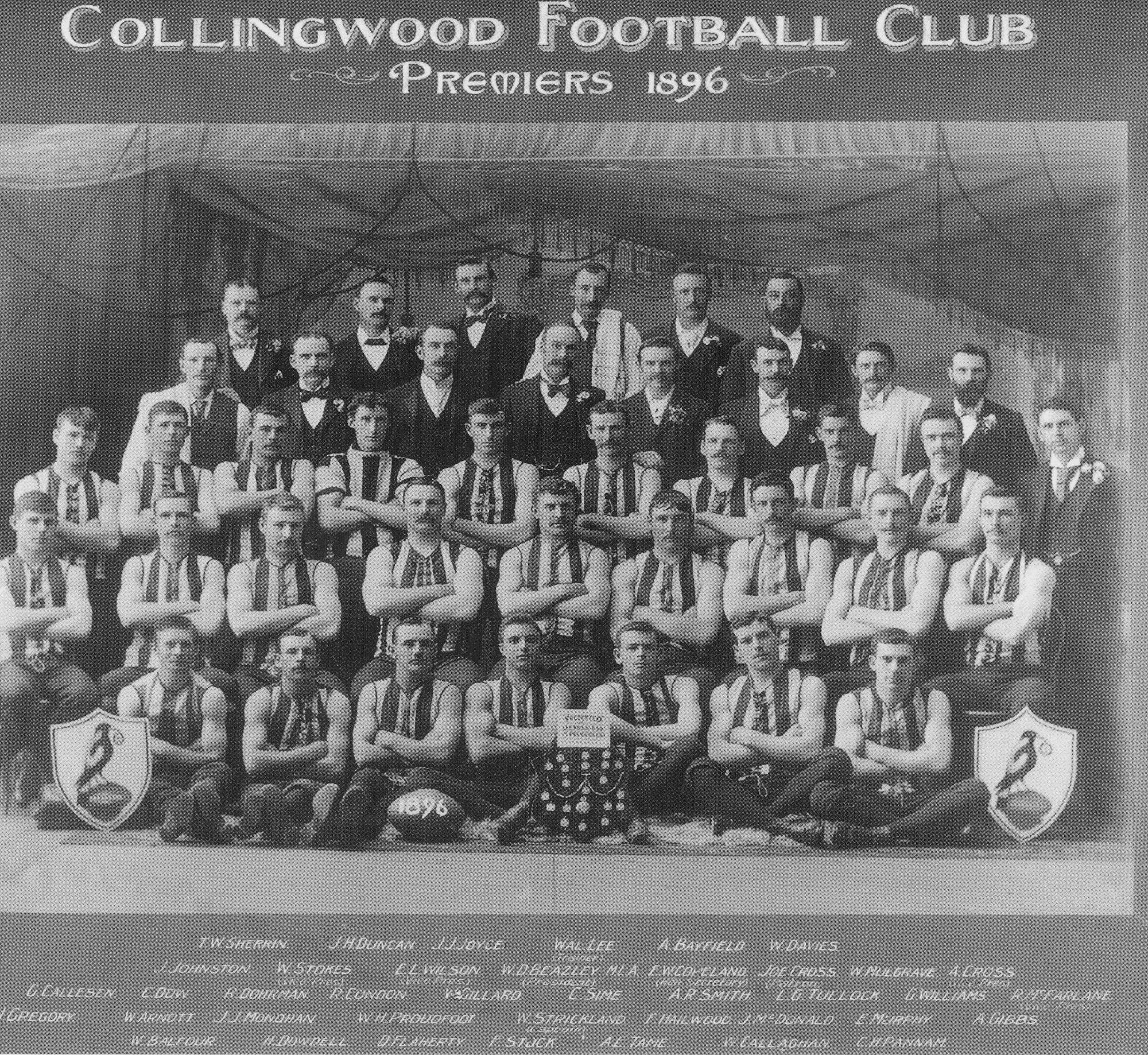
Collingwood's 1896 VFA premiership team. Gregory is at far left of second row.

=== Siblings ===
There were a number of talented footballers among his brothers, including:

- John "Jack" Gregory, born "McPherson" (1864-1923), played in the VFA with Footscray.
- George James Wellington Gregory (1866–1907), played in the Ballarat competition.
- Charles Waterloo Gregory (1867–1939), played in the Ballarat competition.
- Colin Campbell Gregory (1874-1907), played in the VFA with St Kilda (1894), and Footscray (1897 to 1901).
- Frederick Birchall Gregory (1878–1968), played in the VFA with West Melbourne.
- Duncan Alexander Gregory (1880–1964), played in the VFA with West Melbourne.
  - Three of Duncan's sons played VFL football: Harold Valentine "Harry" Gregory (1902–1993) with Essendon; John James "Johnny" Gregory (1905–1992), with North Melbourne; and Bruce Gregory (1915–1998), also with North Melbourne.
- Ernest Henry "Harry" Gregory (1882–1945), played in the VFA with West Melbourne.
- Alfred Compton Gregory (1884–1924), played in the VFA with West Melbourne.
- Arthur Colin Gregory (1886–1966), played in the VFA with West Melbourne, and with Footscray.
- Frank Gregory (1888–1951), played in the VFA with West Melbourne.

== Football ==
=== Collingwood (VFA) ===
Recruited from Ballarat, he played his first game for Collingwood, in its last VFA season, against Melbourne, at Victoria Park, on 13 June 1896.

He played as the resting forward pocket rover (kicking 1 goal) in the Collingwood premiership team that defeated South Melbourne, 6.9 (45) to 5.10 (40), in the 1896 Playoff Match, at the East Melbourne Cricket Ground, on 6 October 1896.

=== Collingwood (VFL) ===
He played for Collingwood against St Kilda, at Victoria Park, on 8 May 1897 (kicking 1 goal) for Collingwood, in the team's first-ever game in the new VFL competition. He went on to play another 46 games for Collingwood (with another 16 goals) over five seasons (1897 to 1901).

== Umpire ==
On his retirement he became an umpire; and, over four seasons (1908 to 1911) he was the boundary umpire for 31 VFL matches and 14 country matches.

== Death ==
He died at East Malvern, Victoria on 14 May 1949.
