= Bruce Gregory =

Bruce Gregory may refer to:

- Bruce Gregory (politician)
- Bruce Gregory (American football)
- Bruce Gregory (Australian footballer)
