= 1896 VFA season =

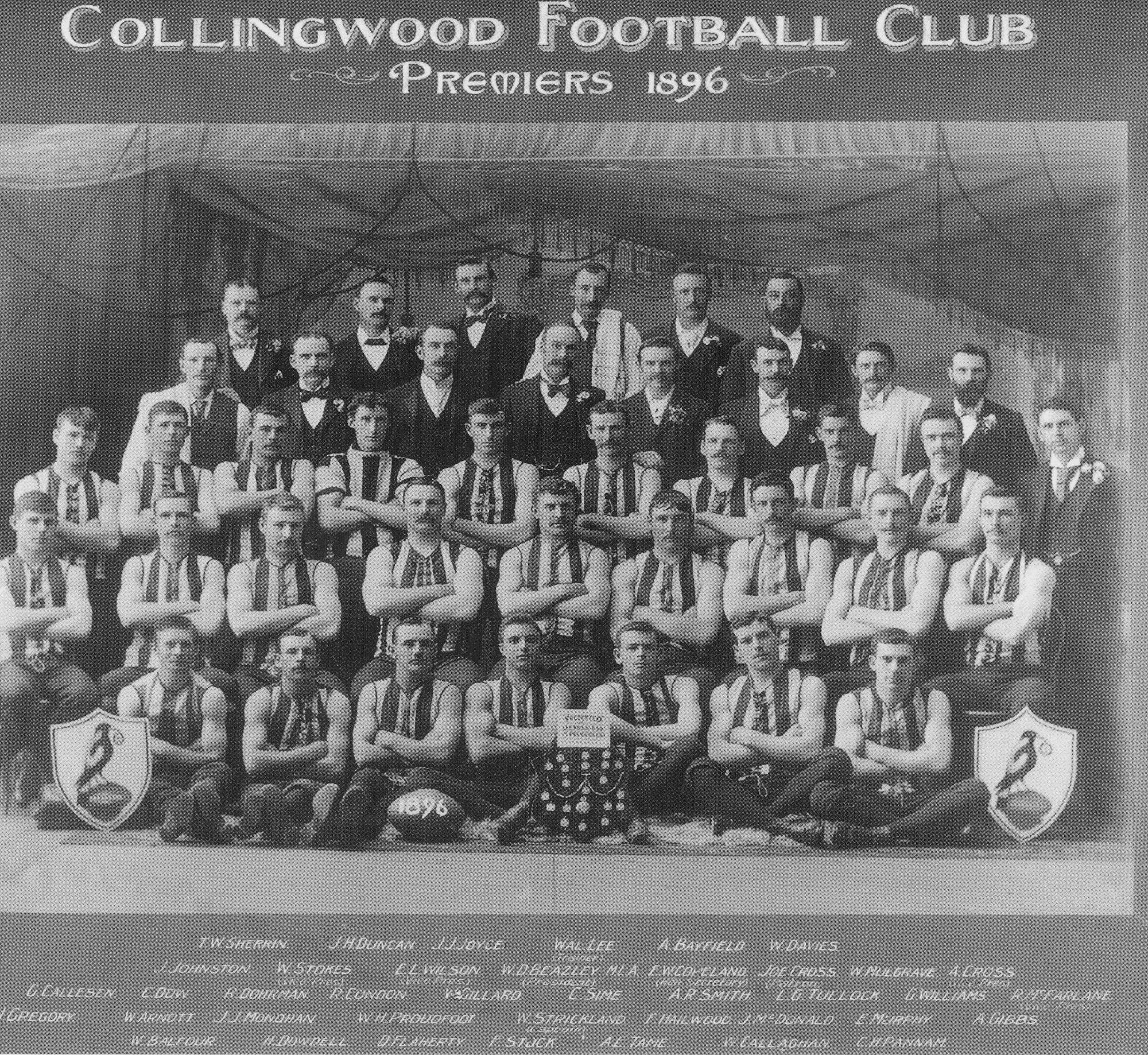
- Collingwood – 1896 VFA premiers

Overview
- Date: 2 May – 3 October 1896
- Teams: 13
- Premiers: Collingwood; 1st premiership
- Leading goalkicker: Norman Waugh (Essendon – 29 goals)

Attendance
- Matches played: 118

The 1896 VFA season was the 20th season of the Victorian Football Association (VFA), the highest-level senior Australian rules football competition in Victoria. The season began on 2 May and concluded with a playoff match on 3 October, in which Collingwood defeated South Melbourne by one goal to claim its first and only VFA premiership.

It was the final season in which the VFA was strongest senior competition in Victoria, with eight of its strongest clubs leaving the Association and establishing the rival Victorian Football League from 1897.

== Premiership season ==
In 1896, the VFA competition consisted of thirteen teams of 20 on-the-field players each. Because there was an odd number of teams, at least one team had a bye each week; the idle club often travelled to Ballarat to play one of the local senior clubs in a non-premiership match.

When reporting match scores in 1896, the number of goals and behinds scored by each team is given; however, only the number of goals scored is considered when determining the result of a match. This was the final VFA season before the introduction of the modern system of scoring, in which six points is awarded for a goal and one point is awarded for a behind.

=== Round 1 ===
	Round 1
Saturday, 2 May	Fitzroy 2.4	def. by	Collingwood 6.8	Fitzroy Cricket Ground
Saturday, 2 May	Melbourne 5.4	def. by	Essendon 9.6	Melbourne Cricket Ground
Saturday, 2 May	Geelong 5.3	def.	Port Melbourne 4.11	Corio Oval
Saturday, 2 May	Richmond 6.3	def.	St Kilda 5.16	Richmond Cricket Ground
Saturday, 2 May	Footscray 3.7	def. by	South Melbourne 5.8	Western Reserve
Saturday, 2 May	North Melbourne 6.6	def.	Williamstown 2.5	North Melbourne Recreation Reserve
	Bye; Carlton

=== Round 2 ===
	Round 2
Saturday, 9 May	St Kilda 5.11	def.	Fitzroy 2.14	St Kilda Cricket Ground
Saturday, 9 May	Footscray 2.8	def. by	Melbourne 6.7	Western Reserve
Saturday, 9 May	Collingwood 3.12	def.	Richmond 0.1	Victoria Park
Saturday, 9 May	South Melbourne 5.5	def.	North Melbourne 4.3	South Melbourne Cricket Ground
Saturday, 9 May	Essendon 10.17	def.	Carlton 0.7	East Melbourne Cricket Ground
Saturday, 9 May	Port Melbourne 3.2	drew with	Williamstown 3.1	Port Melbourne Cricket Ground
	Bye; Geelong

=== Round 3 ===
	Round 3
Saturday, 16 May	Melbourne 11.8	def.	Geelong 9.2	Melbourne Cricket Ground
Saturday, 16 May	Fitzroy 4.8	def. by	Essendon 5.5	Fitzroy Cricket Ground
Saturday, 16 May	Collingwood 4.5	def.	South Melbourne 3.2	Victoria Park
Saturday, 16 May	Port Melbourne 2.13	drew with	Footscray 2.7	Port Melbourne Cricket Ground
Saturday, 16 May	Williamstown 6.8	def.	Richmond 2.6	Williamstown Cricket Ground
Saturday, 16 May	Carlton 2.6	def. by	North Melbourne 6.4	University Cricket Ground
	Bye; St Kilda

=== Round 4 ===
	Round 4 (Queen's Birthday Weekend)
Saturday, 23 May	South Melbourne 8.4	def.	Geelong 2.1	South Melbourne Cricket Ground
Saturday, 23 May	North Melbourne 2.7	def. by	Footscray 4.6	North Melbourne Recreation Reserve
Saturday, 23 May	Richmond 3.3	def. by	Carlton 6.5	Richmond Cricket Ground
Monday, 25 May	Melbourne 5.8	def. by	Fitzroy 6.3	Melbourne Cricket Ground
Monday, 25 May	Essendon 4.14	def.	Collingwood 2.5	East Melbourne Cricket Ground
Monday, 25 May	St Kilda 3.8	drew with	Williamstown 3.6	St Kilda Cricket Ground
	Bye; Port Melbourne

=== Round 5 ===
	Round 5
Saturday, 30 May	Fitzroy 3.6	def.	North Melbourne 2.4	Fitzroy Cricket Ground
Saturday, 30 May	Geelong 2.6	drew with	Footscray 2.7	Corio Oval
Saturday, 30 May	Melbourne 15.11	def.	Williamstown 4.3	Melbourne Cricket Ground
Saturday, 30 May	Carlton 3.10	def. by	Collingwood 4.8	University Cricket Ground
Saturday, 30 May	Essendon 11.6	def.	St Kilda 3.6	East Melbourne Cricket Ground
Saturday, 30 May	Port Melbourne 9.9	def.	Richmond 3.3	Port Melbourne Cricket Ground
	Bye; South Melbourne

=== Round 6 ===
	Round 6
Saturday, 13 June	Geelong 3.6	def. by	Fitzroy 4.8	Corio Oval
Saturday, 13 June	Collingwood 4.4	def.	Melbourne 2.4	Victoria Park
Saturday, 13 June	Essendon 6.7	def.	South Melbourne 4.8	East Melbourne Cricket Ground
Saturday, 13 June	North Melbourne 5.6	def.	Port Melbourne 3.3	North Melbourne Recreation Reserve
Saturday, 13 June	Footscray 10.10	def.	Richmond 4.8	Western Reserve
Saturday, 13 June	St Kilda 5.11	def.	Carlton 3.2	St Kilda Cricket Ground
	Bye; Williamstown

=== Round 7 ===
	Round 7
Saturday, 20 June	Fitzroy 4.13	def.	Footscray 1.4	Fitzroy Cricket Ground
Saturday, 20 June	Carlton 1.1	drew with	Geelong 1.13	Melbourne Cricket Ground
Saturday, 20 June	Williamstown 3.5	def. by	Collingwood 4.3	Williamstown Cricket Ground
Saturday, 20 June	South Melbourne 9.7	def.	Richmond 2.8	South Melbourne Cricket Ground
Saturday, 20 June	Essendon 4.13	def.	Port Melbourne 2.4	East Melbourne Cricket Ground
Saturday, 20 June	St Kilda 1.9	def. by	Melbourne 7.4	St Kilda Cricket Ground
	Bye; North Melbourne

=== Round 8 ===
	Round 8
Saturday, 27 June	Geelong 4.9	def. by	Collingwood 5.7	Corio Oval
Saturday, 27 June	Melbourne 5.6	def. by	South Melbourne 6.3	Melbourne Cricket Ground
Saturday, 27 June	Williamstown 3.2	def. by	Essendon 7.6	Williamstown Cricket Ground
Saturday, 27 June	Carlton 3.5	drew with	Port Melbourne 3.6	University Cricket Ground
Saturday, 27 June	Footscray 3.6	def.	St Kilda 2.7	Western Reserve
Saturday, 27 June	Richmond 5.6	def. by	North Melbourne 8.11	Richmond Cricket Ground
	Bye; Fitzroy

=== Round 9 ===
	Round 9
Saturday, 4 July	Carlton 1.2	def. by	Fitzroy 3.9	Melbourne Cricket Ground
Saturday, 4 July	North Melbourne 4.4	def.	Geelong 2.7	North Melbourne Recreation Reserve
Saturday, 4 July	Collingwood 3.2	def.	St Kilda 0.4	Victoria Park
Saturday, 4 July	South Melbourne 4.4	def.	Port Melbourne 3.3	South Melbourne Cricket Ground
Saturday, 4 July	Richmond 1.4	def. by	Essendon 9.9	Richmond Cricket Ground
Saturday, 4 July	Williamstown 5.6	def.	Footscray 3.3	Williamstown Cricket Ground
	Bye; Melbourne

=== Round 10 ===
	Round 10
Saturday, 11 July	South Melbourne 3.5	def.	Fitzroy 2.7	South Melbourne Cricket Ground
Saturday, 11 July	Essendon 2.3	def. by	Geelong 4.9	East Melbourne Cricket Ground
Saturday, 11 July	Port Melbourne 2.0	def. by	Melbourne 5.5	Port Melbourne Cricket Ground
Saturday, 11 July	Carlton 3.10	def. by	Footscray 5.2	University Cricket Ground
Saturday, 11 July	St Kilda 6.9	def.	Richmond 1.6	St Kilda Cricket Ground
Saturday, 11 July	Williamstown 5.8	def.	North Melbourne 3.8	Williamstown Cricket Ground
	Bye; Collingwood

=== Round 11 ===
	Round 11
Saturday, 18 July	Richmond 2.4	def. by	Fitzroy 10.16	Richmond Cricket Ground
Saturday, 18 July	Geelong 12.14	def.	Williamstown 0.2	Corio Oval
Saturday, 18 July	Melbourne 12.8	def.	North Melbourne 5.6	Melbourne Cricket Ground
Saturday, 18 July	Footscray 4.5	def. by	Collingwood 7.5	Western Reserve
Saturday, 18 July	South Melbourne 3.16	def.	Carlton 1.3	South Melbourne Cricket Ground
Saturday, 18 July	Port Melbourne 6.10	def.	St Kilda 3.2	Port Melbourne Cricket Ground
	Bye; Essendon

=== Round 12 ===
	Round 12
Saturday, 25 July	Fitzroy 4.6	def.	Port Melbourne 2.4	Fitzroy Cricket Ground
Saturday, 25 July	St Kilda 8.5	def.	Geelong 5.13	St Kilda Cricket Ground
Saturday, 25 July	Melbourne 7.11	def.	Carlton 3.4	Melbourne Cricket Ground
Saturday, 25 July	North Melbourne 4.4	def. by	Collingwood 5.6	North Melbourne Recreation Reserve
Saturday, 25 July	Williamstown 3.4	def. by	South Melbourne 5.9	Williamstown Cricket Ground
Saturday, 25 July	Essendon 10.4	def.	Footscray 3.4	East Melbourne Cricket Ground
	Bye; Richmond

=== Round 13 ===
	Round 13
Saturday, 1 August	Essendon 5.9	def.	Fitzroy 2.6	East Melbourne Cricket Ground
Saturday, 1 August	Geelong 5.2	def. by	Collingwood 8.5	Corio Oval
Saturday, 1 August	South Melbourne 2.14	def.	Melbourne 0.4	South Melbourne Cricket Ground
Saturday, 1 August	Richmond 2.5	def. by	Port Melbourne 6.15	Richmond Cricket Ground
Saturday, 1 August	Carlton 2.3	def. by	Williamstown 3.7	University Cricket Ground
Saturday, 1 August	St Kilda 4.13	def.	North Melbourne 2.7	St Kilda Cricket Ground
	Bye; Footscray

=== Round 14 ===
	Round 14
Saturday, 8 August	Fitzroy 10.13	def.	Williamstown 3.4	Fitzroy Cricket Ground
Saturday, 8 August	Geelong 10.18	def.	Richmond 2.4	Corio Oval
Saturday, 8 August	Melbourne 14.12	def.	Footscray 2.6	Melbourne Cricket Ground
Saturday, 8 August	Collingwood 6.6	def.	Port Melbourne 4.11	Victoria Park
Saturday, 8 August	St Kilda 4.4	def. by	South Melbourne 8.10	St Kilda Cricket Ground
Saturday, 8 August	North Melbourne 4.1	def. by	Essendon 11.10	North Melbourne Recreation Reserve
	Bye; Carlton

=== Round 15 ===
	Round 15
Saturday, 15 August	Fitzroy 10.13	def.	Geelong 5.7	Fitzroy Cricket Ground
Saturday, 15 August	Melbourne 6.8	def.	Collingwood 4.3	Melbourne Cricket Ground
Saturday, 15 August	South Melbourne 5.6	def.	Essendon 3.0	South Melbourne Cricket Ground
Saturday, 15 August	Williamstown 2.10	def. by	Port Melbourne 5.9	Williamstown Cricket Ground
Saturday, 15 August	Footscray 7.8	def.	Carlton 4.2	Western Reserve
Saturday, 15 August	Richmond 4.4	def. by	North Melbourne 19.12	Richmond Cricket Ground
	Bye; St Kilda

=== Round 16 ===
	Round 16
Saturday, 22 August	Port Melbourne 5.4	def.	Fitzroy 3.8	Port Melbourne Cricket Ground
Saturday, 22 August	Essendon 5.3	def. by	Melbourne 7.11	East Melbourne Cricket Ground
Saturday, 22 August	South Melbourne 3.10	drew with	Collingwood 3.5	South Melbourne Cricket Ground
Saturday, 22 August	Footscray 4.4	drew with	Williamstown 4.7	Western Reserve
Saturday, 22 August	Carlton 5.4	def.	St Kilda 3.7	University Cricket Ground
	Bye; Geelong, North Melbourne, Richmond

=== Round 17 ===
	Round 17
Saturday, 5 September	Fitzroy 5.6	def.	Melbourne 3.6	Fitzroy Cricket Ground
Saturday, 5 September	St Kilda 6.7	def.	Footscray 5.1	St Kilda Cricket Ground
Saturday, 5 September	Collingwood 6.8	def.	Essendon 3.4	Victoria Park
Saturday, 5 September	Geelong 5.6	def. by	South Melbourne 6.9	Corio Oval
Saturday, 5 September	Richmond 2.1	def. by	Williamstown 4.13	Richmond Cricket Ground
Saturday, 5 September	North Melbourne 6.6	def.	Carlton 1.9	North Melbourne Recreation Reserve
	Bye; Port Melbourne
These matches were originally to be played on Saturday, 29 August, but inclement weather during the week had rendered the grounds unplayable. As such, this round, and all those which followed it, were postponed by one week.

=== Round 18 ===
	Round 18
Saturday, 12 September	Fitzroy 2.15	def.	South Melbourne 0.3	Fitzroy Cricket Ground
Saturday, 12 September	Port Melbourne 5.7	drew with	Geelong 5.5	Port Melbourne Cricket Ground
Saturday, 12 September	Richmond 1.8	def. by	Melbourne 4.12	Richmond Cricket Ground
Saturday, 12 September	Collingwood 9.15	def.	Carlton 1.3	Victoria Park
Saturday, 12 September	Footscray 5.15	drew with	North Melbourne 5.3	Western Reserve
Saturday, 12 September	Williamstown 5.10	def.	St Kilda 2.3	Williamstown Cricket Ground
	Bye; Essendon

=== Round 19 ===
	Round 19
Saturday, 19 September	Collingwood 3.8	def. by	Fitzroy 4.4	Victoria Park
Saturday, 19 September	Geelong 4.7	def. by	Melbourne 5.18	Corio Oval
Saturday, 19 September	Port Melbourne 3.4	def. by	South Melbourne 6.4	Port Melbourne Cricket Ground
Saturday, 19 September	Footscray 5.7	def. by	Essendon 9.15	Western Reserve
Saturday, 19 September	Carlton 2.6	def. by	Richmond 5.5	Richmond City Reserve
Saturday, 19 September	North Melbourne 6.11	def.	St Kilda 4.6	North Melbourne Recreation Reserve
	Bye; Williamstown

=== Round 20 ===
	Round 20
Saturday, 26 September	Geelong 4.7	def. by	Essendon 8.4	Corio Oval
Saturday, 26 September	Port Melbourne 3.9	def.	North Melbourne 1.10	Port Melbourne Cricket Ground
Saturday, 26 September	Richmond 7.5	def.	St Kilda 5.7	Richmond City Reserve
Saturday, 26 September	Williamstown 6.4	def.	Carlton 5.3	Williamstown Cricket Ground
	Bye; Collingwood, Fitzroy, Footscray, Melbourne, South Melbourne

== Ladder ==
1896 VFA ladder
Pos	Team	Pld	W	L	D	GF	GA	Pts
1	Collingwood (P)	18	14	3	1	86	55	58
1	South Melbourne	18	14	3	1	85	55	58
3	Essendon	18	14	4	0	122	64	56
4	Fitzroy	18	12	6	0	80	59	48
4	Melbourne	18	12	6	0	119	66	48
6	North Melbourne	18	8	9	1	92	80	34
6	Port Melbourne	18	7	8	3	72	71	34
6	Williamstown	18	7	8	3	64	89	34
9	Footscray	18	5	10	3	69	94	26
9	St Kilda	18	6	11	1	69	88	26
11	Geelong	18	4	11	3	87	80	22
12	Carlton	18	2	14	2	46	93	12
12	Richmond	18	3	15	0	52	136	12

(P) Premiers

The Association had no formal tie-breakers in cases where clubs were equal on premiership points.

== Playoff match ==
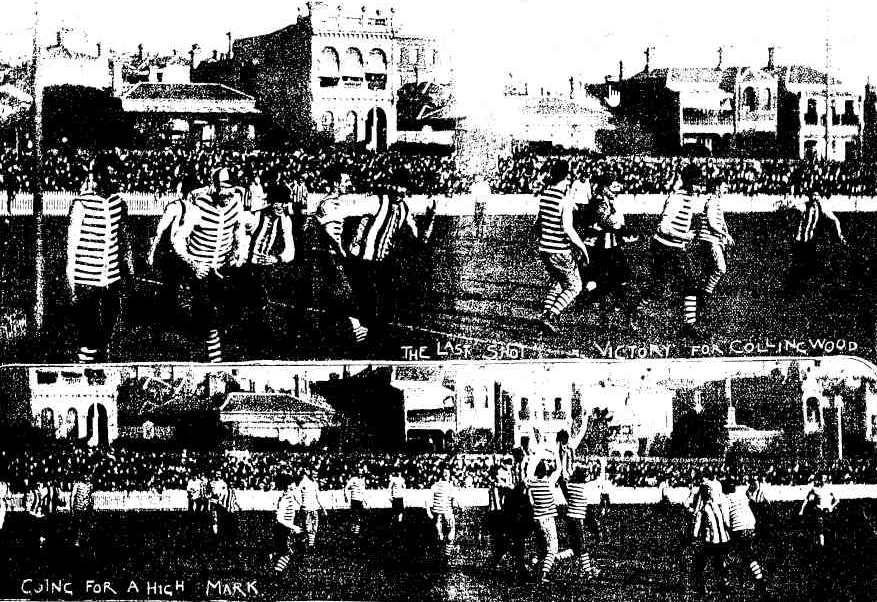
Action from the playoff match.

Collingwood and South Melbourne finished level on 58 premiership points at the conclusion of the premiership matches, meaning a playoff match for the premiership was required between them.

It is often said that this playoff match was required because, in addition to having equal win–loss records, Collingwood and South Melbourne had finished with an equal record of goals scored and goals conceded and therefore could not be split on a tie-breaker; while this version of events is given in several modern references, contemporary sources reveal this to be a myth. Association Rule 19, which specifically covered the event of a playoff, did not consider goals scored or conceded as a means of tie-breaker for the premiership, and newspaper match previews leading into Round 19 made clear that win–loss record was the only consideration for determining whether or not there would be a playoff. Additionally, the clubs' for-and-against records were not quite identical: Collingwood had scored one goal more than South Melbourne for the season, but the fact that the tallies were so close helped to perpetuate the myth.

It was the second time in VFA history that a playoff match was staged for the premiership, the first having occurred in 1878, but it was the first time that a playoff had been required since the formal introduction of the premiership ladder in 1888: the 1878 playoff was required to resolve a dispute between Melbourne and Geelong.

=== Scheduling controversy ===
The fact that a playoff would be required between Collingwood and South Melbourne was known after Round 19: both Collingwood and South Melbourne had a bye in Round 20 with third-placed Essendon six premiership points adrift, leaving them with no chance of tying for or finishing first.

As a result, the two clubs organised to stage their playoff match on Saturday 26 September, the same day as the other Round 20 matches, at the neutral East Melbourne Cricket Ground; arrangements were made and advertisements were published. However, on the Tuesday, delegates from all Association clubs voted 11–8 in favour of postponing the playoff match to Saturday 3 October, the following weekend.

Arguments in favour of postponing the match centred mostly around the fact that a playoff match would detract from interest, attendances and gate takings at the rostered Round 20 matches, while arguments in favour of staging the playoff during Round 20 were to remove the need for the clubs to train for an extra week, and that public desire for the match to be held on 26 September was strong.

A second meeting was held on the Wednesday night after Collingwood and South Melbourne objected to the postponement, but the Association delegates again voted in favour of postponing the match, albeit by a reduced majority of 10–9.

While Collingwood and South Melbourne initially discussed playing the match on 26 September anyway, in spite of the Association's decision, this proved to be unworkable as the Association declined to provide an umpire.

Subsequently, Collingwood arranged to play Bendigo Football League premiers Eaglehawk at Victoria Park during Round 20, winning 6.7 – 3.6, while South Melbourne used the week as a bye.

=== Match summary ===
The playoff match itself was played at a high standard in front of 12,000 spectators at the East Melbourne Cricket Ground. Two late goals in the first quarter allowed Collingwood to open up a 4–2 lead at quarter time, but Collingwood went goalless through the second and third quarters as South Melbourne dominated the game and regained the lead at 5–4. Collingwood tied the game early in the final quarter, then kicked the winning goal inside the final ten minutes to win 6–5.

Playoff Match for the 1896 VFA Premiership
Saturday, 3 October (3:00 pm)	Collingwood	def.	South Melbourne	East Melbourne Cricket Ground (crowd: 12,000 approx.)
4.3; 4.4; 4.6; 6.9	Q1; Q2; Q3; Final	2.1; 3.6; 5.9; 5.10	Umpires: J. J. Trait
Condon, Dowdall, Flaherty, Gregory, Hailwood, Hall	Goals	McKay 2; Adamson, Pleass, Windley

== Notable events ==
- Following Collingwood's 4–3 win against Carlton in Round 5, it was revealed that due to a timekeepers' error the final quarter had lasted 30 minutes instead of the regulation 25 minutes. Because Collingwood had scored the winning goal in these extra five minutes (in fact, on the final bell), Carlton formally challenged to have the result amended to a 3–3 draw. The challenge was dismissed at the Association's next meeting three weeks later. The ultimate importance of this decision on the final placings should not be overlooked as Collingwood tied for first place and Carlton tied for last place on the ladder.
- In its Round 9 match against first placed Essendon, last placed Richmond was penalised for having too many men on the field. Richmond was leading Essendon at half time by 3.3 – 2.4, but Essendon called for a head count after half time, which found Richmond had 21 men on the field. Richmond's score was reset to zero, and Essendon went on to win 9.9 – 1.4. Four weeks later against Port Melbourne, Richmond was subjected to another head count at half-time, and the umpire again found Richmond had 21 men on the field, but a recount after the players had gone to the dressing rooms found only twenty, so Richmond was not penalized.
- Local fans at the North Melbourne Recreation Reserve rioted following North Melbourne's 4–5 loss to Collingwood in Round 12, mostly venting their anger against umpire Roberts' interpretation of the little mark. They invaded the field, some with weapons, and players from both teams were forced to protect Roberts from the mob, with Bill Proudfoot, a constable with Victoria Police, escorting him out of the ground. McDougall of North Melbourne was the most badly injured player in the riot, concussed after a blow to the head. The incident added to the already bad reputation of the North Melbourne ground and the "ruffianly element" of its patrons.
- On 2 October, the day before the playoff match for the premiership, six of the league's strongest clubs (Collingwood, Essendon, Fitzroy, Geelong, Melbourne and South Melbourne) opted to secede from the Victorian Football Association and establish the Victorian Football League as a distinct rival competition from 1897, and invited Carlton and St Kilda to defect, bringing the size of the new league to eight clubs. The split was the culmination of several years of concerns from the strongest clubs about the standard and competitiveness of the Association. As such, the VFA ceased to serve as the top senior level of football in Victoria after twenty seasons; it has continued operating as a second-tier senior competition since.

== Charity Cup ==
On the Saturday between Rounds 5 and 6, a Charity Cup event was held, the gate takings from which were donated to charity. The event consisted of four clubs – Collingwood, Essendon, Port Melbourne and South Melbourne – contesting a knock-out tournament of shortened matches at the Melbourne Cricket Ground on a single afternoon, a format which has since become known as a lightning premiership. Each match was played over two periods of twenty minutes each. The competition was won by Essendon.

The Charity Cup was used to trial two new rules in the VFA:

- The use of boundary umpires, one on each sideline, to conduct boundary throw-ins; at the time, this responsibility fell to the field umpire in the VFA
- The removal of the "little mark", which meant the ball had to be kicked at least ten yards for the umpire to call a mark.

Both of these rule changes were soon adopted into all levels of the game.

	Charity Cup Semi-finals
Saturday, 6 June	Essendon 3.3	def.	Collingwood 2.5	Melbourne Cricket Ground
Saturday, 6 June	Port Melbourne 2.1	def.	South Melbourne 1.4	Melbourne Cricket Ground

	Charity Cup Final
Saturday, 6 June	Essendon 2.4	def.	Port Melbourne 1.1	Melbourne Cricket Ground
