= 1939 Little All-America college football team =

American college football all-star team

The 1939 Little All-America college football team is composed of college football players from small colleges and universities who were selected by the Associated Press (AP) as the best players at each position. For 1939, the AP selected both a first team and a second team.

== First-team ==
Position	Player	Team
QB	Lloyd Madden	Colorado Mines
HB	Sam Hammerstrom	Union (NY)
HB	Tony Canadeo	Gonzaga
FB	Roy Zimmerman	San José State
E	Sherrill Busby	Troy State
E	Jack Mulkey	Fresno State
T	Jack Gregory	Chattanooga
T	Mike Kostiuk	Detroit Tech
G	Marion Rogers	Maryville (MO)
G	Frank Loughney	La Salle
C	Bulldog Turner	Hardin–Simmons

== Second-team ==
Position	Player	Team
QB	Tom Harding	Butler
HB	Leo Wisneski	Central Michigan
HB	Kenneth Heineman	Texas Mines
FB	Joe Enzler	Portland
E	Neal Allen	Mercer
E	Jim Reiser	Ohio Wesleyan
T	Paul Debruhl	Newberry
T	Marvin Katzenstein	Colorado Mines
G	Dick Linder	Trinity (CT)
G	Stanley Radjunas	Morehead State
C	Ralph Schlosser	Gonzaga

== See also ==
- 1939 College Football All-America Team
