= Stephen Gregory =

Stephen, Steven, or Steve Gregory may refer to:

- Stephen S. Gregory (1849–1920), American lawyer
- Stephen Gregory (author) (1952–2024), Welsh horror writer
- Steve Gregory (born 1945), English jazz musician
- Steve Gregory (American football) (born 1983)
- Steven Gregory (born 1987), English footballer
- Stephen Gregory, American newspaper executive with The Epoch Times
