= Bob Gregory =

Bob Gregory may refer to:

- Bob Gregory (comics) (1921–2003), American comics artist and writer
- Bob Gregory (cricketer) (1902–1973), English cricketer
- Bob Gregory (politician) (born 1936), Australian politician
- Bob Gregory (American football) (born 1963) American college football coach and former player

== See also ==
- Bob Gregor (born 1957), American former pro football player
- Robert Gregory (disambiguation)
