= Sherrill Busby =

American football player (1914–1960)

- Busby in 1939

No. 16
- Position: End

Personal information
- Born: March 30, 1914; Montgomery, Alabama
- Died: June 7, 1960 (aged 46); Alexander City, Alabama
- Listed height: 6 ft 2 in (1.88 m)
- Listed weight: 200 lb (91 kg)

Career information
- High school: Sidney Lanier (Montgomery, AL)
- College: Troy State
- NFL draft: 1940: undrafted

Career history
- Brooklyn Dodgers (1940)

Awards and highlights
- First-team Little All-American (1939)

Career NFL statistics
- Games played: 2
- Games started: 0
- Stats at Pro Football Reference

Sherrill Busby (March 30, 1914 – June 7, 1960) was an American professional football end for the Brooklyn Dodgers of the National Football League (NFL).

A native of Montgomery, Alabama, he attended that city's Sidney Lanier High School. He played college football for Troy State Trojans. He was selected as captain of the 1939 Troy team. After the 1939 season, he was selected by the Associated Press as a first-team player on its Little All-America team and its All-Southern Intercollegiate Athletic Association team. He played professional football in the National Football League (NFL) for the Brooklyn Dodgers during the 1940 season. He appeared in three games for the Dodgers as a defensive end. He served in the Army during World War II.

After his playing career, he was the coach in Arkansas and later for several years at Highland Home School in Highland Home, Alabama. He died in 1960 at age 46 when he suffered a heart attack while wading in the water at his cottage near Alexander City, Alabama.
