= Lloyd Madden =

American football player (1918–2011)

- Madden in 1939

No. 14
- Position: Wingback

Personal information
- Born: August 27, 1918; Lewis, Kansas, U.S.
- Died: December 26, 2011 (aged 93); Midland, Texas, U.S.
- Listed height: 6 ft 1 in (1.85 m)
- Listed weight: 195 lb (88 kg)

Career information
- High school: Manhattan (Manhattan, Kansas)
- College: Colorado Mines
- NFL draft: 1940: 3rd round, 16th overall pick

Career history
- Chicago Cardinals (1940)

Awards and highlights
- First-team Little All-American (1939)

Career NFL statistics
- Rushing yards: 186
- Rushing touchdowns: 2
- Receptions: 4
- Receiving yards: 90
- Receiving touchdowns: 1
- Stats at Pro Football Reference

Lloyd Willis Madden (August 27, 1918 – December 26, 2011) was an American professional football player who was a wingback in the National Football League (NFL). He played college football for the Colorado Mines Orediggers and professionally for the Chicago Cardinals. In 1939, he led college football with 141 points scored, rushed for 1,316 yards in eight games, and was selected as a first-team Little All-American.

== Early life ==
Madden was born in 1918 in Lewis, Kansas, and attended Manhattan High School in Manhattan, Kansas.

== Colorado School of Mines ==
Madden played college football at Colorado School of Mines from 1936 to 1939. As a junior in 1938, he led the Rocky Mountain Conference (RMC) in scoring. As a senior in 1939, he rushed for 1,316 yards in only eight games. He led the nation in scoring with 141 points scored (23 touchdowns and three extra points), breaking the RMC scoring record set in 1937 by Byron White. He also led the undefeated 1939 Colorado Mines Orediggers football team to the RMC championship and was selected by both the Associated Press (AP) and the United Press as a first-team player on the 1939 All-Rocky Mountain Conference football team. He was also selected by the AP as the first-team quarterback on the 1939 Little All-America college football team.

== Professional football ==
Madden was selected by the Chicago Cardinals in the third round with the 16th pick in the 1940 NFL draft. He signed with the Cardinals, appearing in ten games, four as a starter, for the 1940 Cardinals. He totaled 186 rushing yards and two touchdowns on 29 carries for an average of 6.4 yards per carry. He also caught three passes for 90 yards and a touchdown. The Cardinals added a naked reverse play to take advantage of Madden's speed, and Madden ran 65 yards for a touchdown against the Chicago Bears on the play.

== Later life ==
Madden earned enough money playing football in 1940 to complete his college education. He was offered a 1941 contract by the Cardinals, but declined to sign while completing his education and waiting to see what job offers he received after receiving his degree in May 1941. He did not return to professional football. Upon graduation, he accepted a job with an oil company in Texas, but he was drafted into the Army service two weeks later. Madden became a weather officer in the Army Air Forces and spent seven months at UCLA studying meterorology, followed by two months of further study at the University of California.

Madden was nominated to the College Football Hall of Fame in 1959. He did not receive sufficient votes. However, he was inducted into the NAIA Hall of Fame in 1960, and the Rocky Mountain Athletic Conference Hall of Fame in 2003. He died in 2011 at age 93 in Midland, Texas.
