= Gregory Paul (disambiguation) =

Gregory Paul may refer to:

- Gregory S. Paul, American freelance researcher, author and illustrator who works in paleontology
- Gregory Paul of Brzeziny (1525–1591), Socinian writer and theologian

== See also ==
- Gregory Paul Martin, British actor, writer and producer
- Paul Gregory (disambiguation)
