= Sir Richard Gregory, 1st Baronet =

British astronomer and promoter of science

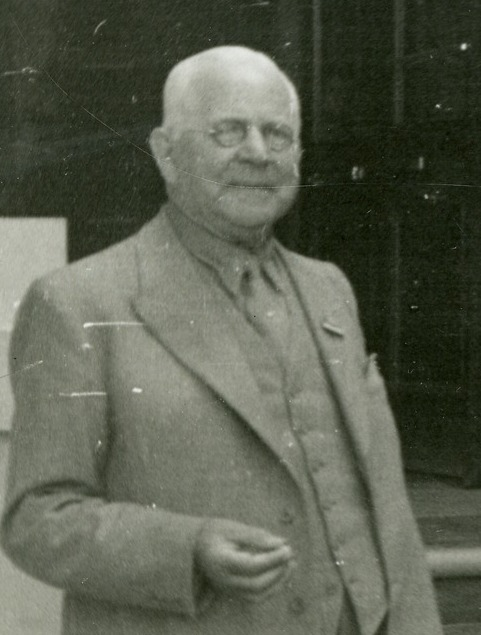
Sir Richard Gregory, 1938

Sir Richard Arman Gregory, 1st Baronet FRS, FRAS (29 January 1864 – 15 September 1952) was a British astronomer and promoter of science. Some of his work was published as by Richard A. or R. A. Gregory.

Richard Arman Gregory was born in Bristol on 29 January 1864. His father was John Gregory, 'the poet cobbler'.

Gregory was professor of astronomy at Queen's College, London, and wrote textbooks on astronomy, chemistry, hygiene, physics and other scientific subjects. He was also a member of the Council of British Association for the advancement of science and Chairman of the Committee on Science Teaching in Secondary Schools. He was knighted in 1919, for "remarkable public work in organising the British Scientific Products Exhibition". He subsequently served as editor of Nature between 1919 and 1939, and was credited with helping to establish Nature in the international scientific community. In 1924, he served as president of the Geographical Association. His obituary by the Royal Society stated: "Gregory was always very interested in the international contacts of science, and in the columns of Nature he always gave generous space to accounts of the activities of the International Scientific Unions." He was created a Baronet, of Bristol in the County of Gloucester, on 30 January 1931. In 1933 he was elected a Fellow of the Royal Society.

Under his tenure as editor-in-chief, Nature criticized the Nazi regime in Germany for repressing and expelling Jewish scientists. The Nazi regime banned Nature from German libraries in 1937.

From 1947 to 1951, Gregory became President of the Ethical Union (now Humanists UK), succeeding journalist H. N. Brailsford, and succeeded by the legal scholar Lord Chorley. He was also an Honorary Associate of the Rationalist Association.

Gregory married Dorothy Mary Page (Dusky) on 27 Jan 1931. He died in September 1952, aged 88, when the baronetcy became extinct. Gregory was elected by the old students of the Royal College of Science to be president of the Royal College of Science Association of Imperial College London, and served from 1919 until 1922.

== Arms ==
Coat of arms of Sir Richard Gregory, 1st Baronet

Crest
Upon a bridge composed of one whole and two half arches masoned Proper a griffin passant Azure.
Escutcheon
Per chevron Or and Azure semee of estoiles of the first in chief two open books Proper edged Gold bound Gules issuant from coulds in base a globe Proper.
Motto
Neminem Timere

Baronetage of the United Kingdom
New creation	Baronet (of Bristol); 1931–1952	Extinct
Media offices
Preceded by Norman Lockyer (1869–1919)	Editor in Chief of Nature; 1919–1939	Succeeded by L. J. F. Brimble (1939–1961)
Preceded by Norman Lockyer (1869–1919)	Editor in Chief of Nature; 1919–1939	Succeeded by A. J. V. Gale (1939–1961)
