= Valentin Gregor =

German jazz violinist, singer and composer

Valentin Gregor (born May 1963 in Bonn, West Germany) is a jazz violinist, singer and composer.

Gregor is the son of the German folk music researcher Josef Gregor. He began playing the violin at the age of seven. Following his studies at the college of music in Cologne (1988–1992), he received a scholarship from Berklee College of Music, Boston, USA (1995–1997). During his stay at Berklee, he worked with accomplished musicians like Stephane Grappelli, Herb Geller, Ed Harris, Garrison Fewell, Duduka da Fonseca, Hans Glawischnig and Nicolas Simion. When he returned from Berklee, he performed both as solo violinist and musical director in various theatres and band projects. His performances included Cirque du Soleil, Deutsche Schauspielhaus, Hamburg, Maxim Gorki Theater, Berlin, Deutsche Theater, Berlin, Deutsche Schauspielhaus, Hanover and Hans-Peter Wodarz's Dinnershow Pomp Duck and Circumstance.

Gregor also played as a solo violinist with Calexico and the Electric Light Band (with Phil Bates, singer and songwriter of ELO Part II ). Furthermore, he performed with Carlos Bica and his project DIZ, exploring new ways in Fado Jazz.

He has lived in Berlin since 2004 and has been a lecturer at the Fairbanks Summer Arts Festival, USA since 2006. His latest album (The Berlin Songbook), where he is exploring new avenues with the piano player Victor Alcántara, was released in March 2007.

== Discography ==
2000 DYAD (Ken Hatfield)

2004 Smellodie

2007 The Berlin Songbook
