= Izabella Grzegory =

Polish physicist

Izabella Alicja Grzegory (born 9 August 1959) is a Polish condensed matter physicist specializing in crystal growth of semiconductors at high pressures. She is the director of the Institute of High Pressure Physics of the Polish Academy of Sciences.

== Education and career ==
Grzegory completed a degree at the Saint Petersburg Electrotechnical University in Russia in 1983, and went on to complete her doctorate and habilitation through the Institute of High Pressure Physics of the Polish Academy of Sciences.

She has worked at the Institute of High Pressure Physics since 1983. There, she was a research assistant from 1983 to 1985, senior research assistant from 1985 to 1995, research associate and head of laboratory from 1995 to 2008, associate professor from 2008 to 2009, deputy director from 2010 to 2011, and director since 2011.

== Recognition ==
Grzegory became a Fellow of the Warsaw Science Society in 2011. She was elected to Academia Europaea in 2019, and as a corresponding member of the Polish Academy of Sciences in 2022.

She is a recipient of the Polish Gold Cross of Merit.
