= Gréta Gregorová =

Slovak politician (born 2001)

Member of the National Council
- Incumbent
- Assumed office 9 September 2025

Personal details
- Born: 19 February 2001 (age 24) Bratislava, Slovakia
- Political party: Progressive Slovakia

Gréta Gregorová (born 19 February 2001) is a Slovak politician. Since 2025, she has served as a Member of the National Council of Slovakia.

== Biography ==
Gréta Gregorová was born on 19 February 2001 in Bratislava. She was educated at the Italian gymnasium in the Karlova Ves borough. In 2023 she graduated in international relations from the Masaryk University, where she subsequently enrolled in graduate program.

=== Political career ===
From 2022 to 2024 she led the youth organization of the Progressive Slovakia party. In 2022 she was elected a member of the assembly of the Petržalka borough of Bratislava. She also worked as a staffer for the MP Simona Petrík and later analyst for the GLOBSEC think tank. In September 2025 she became an MP herself, coming as a replacement for the Progressive Slovakia MP Viera Kalmárová, who resigned her seat. At the age of 24, she became the youngest member of the Council.
