= Kurt Gregor =

German politician (1907–1990)

Minister for Foreign Trade and Inner German Trade
- In office 1952–1954
- Prime Minister: Otto Grotewohl

Personal details
- Born: 21 August 1907 Dresden, German Empire
- Died: 5 May 1990 (aged 82) East Berlin, East Germany
- Party: Communist Party of Germany; Socialist Unity Party of Germany

Kurt Gregor (1907–1990) was a German socialist politician who served as the minister for foreign and inner-German trade between 1952 and 1954 in the East German Council of Ministers.

== Early life and education ==
Gregor was born on 21 August 1907 in Dresden, and his father was a worker. After attending elementary school in Dresden, he did an apprenticeship as a mechanic from 1923 to 1926 and practiced this profession from 1926 to 1927 in Dresden. He attended evening courses at a technical school in Dresden, obtaining the technical qualification in 1929.

== Career ==
Gregor was a technician and then an engineer in the machine factories in Dresden between 1927 and 1932. He joined the Communist Party of Germany and Rote Hilfe, German affiliate of the International Red Aid, in 1931. He worked as a technical director in the USSR from 1932 to 1938. He headed the standards department and was the technical manager in machine works in Dresden between 1938 and 1945.

Gregor joined the Socialist Unity Party of Germany in 1946. He was the head of the economic planning department in the Saxon state government from 1946 to 1950. He served as the state secretary at the Ministry of Heavy Industry in East Berlin between 1950 and 1951. Then, he was the state secretary at the Ministry for Foreign Trade and Inner German Trade for two terms, from 1951 to 1952 and from 1954 to 1956.

Gregor was appointed minister for foreign and inner German trade in September 1952, succeeding Georg Handke in the post. Gregor remained in office until November 1954. Heinrich Rau was appointed minister for foreign and inner German trade in April 1955.

Gregor worked as the first deputy chairman of the state planning commission between 1956 and 1961. He was a member of the East German Parliament from 1958 to 1963 and was the deputy secretary of the Council for Mutual Economic Assistance in Moscow.

== Death ==
Gregor died in Berlin on 5 May 1990.
