= John Gregory (poet) =

British poet, shoemaker and activist

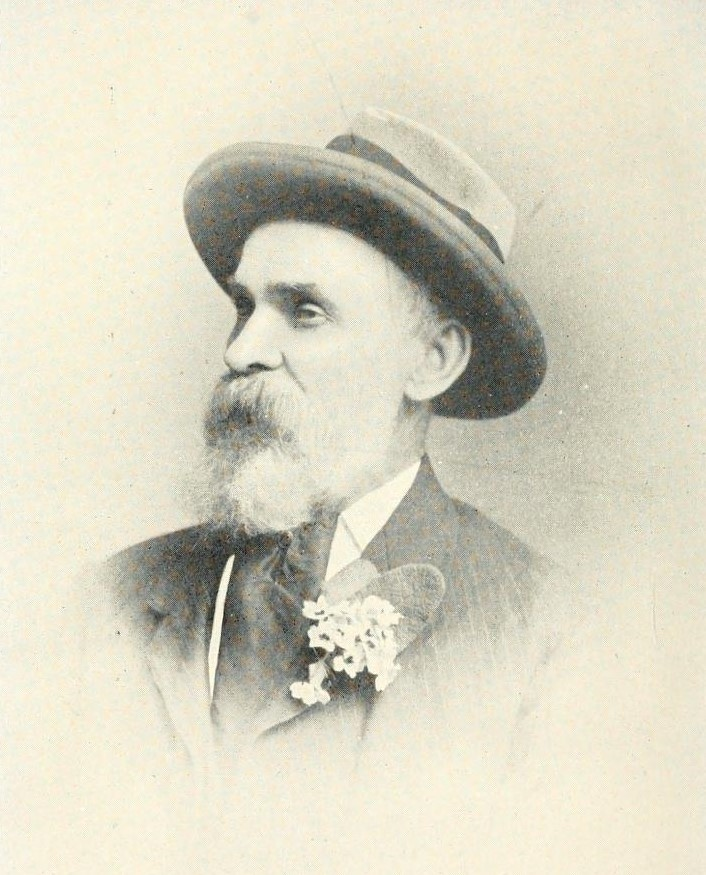
- Born: 14 July 1831; Bideford, Devon
- Died: 20 May 1922 (aged 90); Bristol
- Resting place: Greenbank Cemetery, Bristol
- Occupation(s): Shoemaker, poet, trade unionist, peace activist
- Spouse: Ann Arman (m. 1856)
- Children: Sir Richard Gregory, 1st Baronet

John Gregory (14 July 1831 – 20 May 1922) was a shoemaker, poet, peace activist and trade unionist, sometimes referred to as 'the poet-shoemaker of Bristol' or the 'poet cobbler'. He has been called "a pioneering figure in the development of an independent working-class movement in Bristol".

== Life ==
John Gregory was born in Bideford, Devon on 14 July 1831. His father was a clerk in a merchant's office, and a well-respected Wesleyan preacher. His mother died in 1854. Gregory had limited schooling, and was apprenticed into shoemaking in 1842, aged 11. During his apprenticeship, he met Edward Capern, known as 'the postman-poet', who was a significant influence on the young Gregory. His first literary work was published in the North Devon Journal.

Following seven years as an apprentice, Gregory migrated to Bristol, returned to Devon in 1852, and subsequently found work in Tenby, Aberavon, and Swansea. In 1856, in Bristol where Gregory had travelled to help a sick friend, he met his future wife, Ann Arman, who he married after courtship of five weeks. They moved to Bristol in 1860. One of their sons was Sir Richard Gregory, 1st Baronet, science writer and editor of Nature. The couple lived to celebrate their diamond wedding anniversary in 1916.

== Political activism ==
Writing after his death, Justice described Gregory as becoming actively involved with the working class movement immediately upon moving to Bristol in 1860, and remaining so for the rest of his life.

He was one of the founders of the Co-operative movement in the Western city, and a pioneer in the Trade Union movement, being at one time president of the Bristol Trades Council. In his earlier years he was associated with the Radical Reform movement, but... he early threw in his lot with the Bristol Socialist Society. For the B.S.S. he was always a willing and active worker...

Gregory was described as "one of a pioneer band of social reformers, actively engaged in establishing the socialist and labour movements", grouped alongside others including Ben Tillett, Jim O’Grady, and Ramsay MacDonald. According to historian Gerrard Sables, Gregory was "a strong supporter of the North in the American Civil War, of national independence movements in Poland and Ireland, and a prominent local campaigner against imperialism and the death penalty."

== Poetry ==
Gregory was a regular contributor to the Western Daily Press, Bristol Evening News, and the Bristol Observer. He published his first book of poems in 1871, at the age of 40. Introducing this work, Idyls of Labour, Gregory wrote: "All things in Nature have their preface. The baby-bud is the herald of the full-blown rose... I would say this book is the consummation of a working man's desire."

In West-Country Poets (1896), W.H.K. Wright wrote of Gregory that he had:

cultivated the Muse under great difficulties, and it is difficult to say what he might have done had his lot been less hampered with the consideration of how to make both ends meet. His personal struggles and difficulties find a loud echo in his poems, and the sacred cause of labour has inspired many of his best idyls.

In 1907, Gregory's fourth collection, My Garden, and other poems, was reviewed in The New York Times. The Times described it as being "made up of graceful and sincere poetry", and curious for the fact that "Mr. Gregory is a shoemaker" and "about 75 years old". At this time, Gregory was still working as a repairer of boots and shoes at Clifton College. In 1911, in his 81st year, he published A Dream of Love in Eden. A local newspaper described Gregory as "a thinker and a philosopher", whose poetry had "a true ring... showing that he feels what he writes".

== Death and legacy ==
In his later years, Gregory and his wife were cared for in Clifton by their daughter. Ann Gregory died in June 1921.

John Gregory died in the spring of 1922, at the age of 90. His funeral took place at Greenbank Cemetery, Bristol. An obituary in Justice stated that it would "always be said of Gregory that he was never afraid of his convictions or of giving forceable expression to them." The Western Daily Press described Gregory as "one of the Grand Old Men of Bristol, for he devoted the greater part of his life to the betterment of the people and to interpreting, by his writings, the wonders of Nature".

Gerrard Sables, a Bristol historian, has researched and written about John Gregory, publishing A Souvenir of John Gregory, 1831-1922: Bristol's Socialist Poet and Humanitarian in 2007.

== Bibliography ==
- Idyls of Labour (1871)
- Song Streams (1877)
- Murmurs and Melodies (1884)
- My Garden, and other poems (1907)
- A Dream of Love in Eden (1911)
