= Paul Gregory =

Paul Gregory may refer to:

- Paul Gregory (baseball) (1908–1999), Major League pitcher and college coach
- Paul Gregory (lighting designer) (born 1952), president and founder of Focus Lighting
- Paul Gregory (producer) (1920–2015), American film and theatre producer
- Paul R. Gregory (born 1949), English fantasy artist
- Paul Roderick Gregory, professor of economics, University of Houston, Texas
- Paul Gregory (squash player) (born 1968), English squash player

== See also ==
- Paul Gregory Bootkoski (born 1940), bishop of the Roman Catholic Diocese of Metuchen
- Paul Gregori (fl. 1990s), paralympic athlete from France
- Gregory Paul (disambiguation)
