= Vicki L. Gregory =

American academic and librarian (1950–2026)

- Born: February 13, 1950; Chattanooga, Tennessee, U.S.
- Died: January 4, 2026 (aged 75)
- Education: University of Alabama; Rutgers, The State University of New Jersey
- Occupations: Professor, Librarian

Vicki L. Gregory (February 13, 1950 – January 4, 2026) was an American academic and librarian who was professor emeritus at the School of Information at the University of South Florida (USF).

Gregory was director of the School from 1999 until 2007. Her fields of specialization include: academic libraries, digital librarianship, technical services, information science, library networking, library automation, and collection development. Prior to teaching at USF Gregory was Director of Systems and Operations for the Auburn University at Montgomery Library. She was President of Beta Phi Mu. She was also Treasurer for the Association for Information Science and Technology (ASIS&T) and the winner of the 2014 Watson Davis Award. She is also the author, co-author, or editor of seven books and has published numerous articles.

== Education ==
Gregory received an A.B. in History in 1971 from the University of Alabama (UA), and a M.A. in history, also at UA, in 1973. Remaining at the University of Alabama, she went on to complete the Graduate School of Library Service's M.L.S. degree in 1974. Finally, she received her Ph.D. in communication, Information and Library Studies from Rutgers, The State University of New Jersey, in 1987.

== Career ==
Gregory began her professional career at the Auburn University at Montgomery Library in 1976 as an audio-visual librarian and a supervisor for the Acquisitions Department, then Coordinator of Technical Services, and finally Head of the Department of Systems and Operations. She finished her time at the library in 1988, by which time she had become a tenured librarian.

In August 1988, she became an assistant professor at the School of Library and Information Science at the University of South Florida (USF). She was tenured and promoted to associate professor in 1994, then professor in 2000. That same year she was made director of the School of Library and Information Science, a position she held until 2007. She was a professor at the USF School of Information.

== Professional activities ==
Gregory was active in many professional associations. She was president of Beta Phi Mu, the international honor society. She was Treasurer for the Association for Information Science & Technology (ASIS&T). She served the American Library Association (ALA) as a Member-at-Large for the Library Research Roundtable Steering Committee, and she was the ALA Councilor for the Florida Library Association (FLA). Gregory has served as Chair of the ALA Committee on Accreditation from 2010 until 2012 and was a member of the committee from 2007 until 2009. She served on the ALA Notable Book Council. Gregory was director of the FLA from 2001 until 2003, was a chair of the Florida ASIS&T, Chair of ASIS&T's Special Interest Group - Library Technologies (SIG-LT), a chair of the Association of College and Research Libraries (ACRL) Academic/Research Librarian of the Year Committee, chair of the ACRL Research Committee, and a Secretary of the Library Research Round Table Steering Committee. She served as Florida representative to the Southeastern Library Association.

== Death ==
Gregory died on January 4, 2026, at the age of 75.

== Honors ==
- Beta Phi Mu (Library and Information Science Honorary Society)
- 1985 Recipient of the Association of College and Research Libraries and Institute for Scientific Information Doctoral Dissertation Fellowship
- 1987 Selected as one of the Outstanding Young Women of America
- 1995 Florida SUS Teaching Incentive Program Award
- 1996 Florida Library Association Transformers Honor Roll
- 2003 USF President's Award for Faculty Excellence
- Phi Alpha Theta (History Honorary Society)
- 2007 Outstanding Alumni, University of Alabama, Graduate School of Library and Information Science
- 2014 Watson Davis Award, American Society for Information Science & Technology (ASIS&T)

== Select journal articles ==
- Gregory, V., & Cox, K. (2013). Implications of voluntary communication based on gender, education level and cultural issues in an online environment. Informing Science & Information Technology, 10, 227–239.
- Kwon, N., & Gregory, V. (2007). The effects of librarians' behavioral performance on user satisfaction in chat reference services. Reference & User Services Quarterly, 47(2), 137–148
- Hastings, S., Gregory, V., Montague, R., & Lester, J. (2005). Distance education: How are we doing, and how do we know? Proceedings of the American Society for Information Science and Technology, 42(1), NA-NA.
- Gregory, V., & Wohlmuth, S. R. (2002). Planning for the internationalization of a postgraduate professional degree programme in library and information science. Higher Education in Europe, 27(3), 261–268.
- Perrault, A., & Gregory, V. (2002). The integration of assessment of student learning outcomes and teaching effectiveness.

== Books ==
- Gregory V. (2019) Collection development and management for 21st century library collections. (2nd ed.) Chicago: ALA Editions.
- Gregory, V., de la Peña McCook, K., & Long, A. (Eds.). (2011). ACURIL XLI: Proceedings from the annual conference: The role of libraries and archives in disaster preparedness. Tampa, FL: Association of Caribbean University, Research and Institutional Libraries.
- Gregory, V. (2011). Collection development and management for the Twenty-First Century library collections. New York, NY: Neal-Schuman, Inc.
- Gregory, V. (2006). Selecting and Managing Electronic Resources. New York, NY: Neal-Schuman, Inc.
- Gregory, V. (Ed.). (2000). Selecting and managing electronic resources. New York, NY: Neal-Schuman, Inc.
- Gregory, V., & Stauffer, M. (1999). Multicultural resources on the Internet: The United States and Canada. Littleton, CO: Libraries Unlimited
- Gregory, V. (1993). The state and the academic library. Westport, CN: Greenwood Press
- Gregory, V. (Ed.). (1991). A dynamic tradition: A history of Alabama academic libraries. Birmingham, AL: Birmingham Public Library Press.
