= Robert Gregory =

Robert Gregory may refer to:

== Politicians ==
- Robert Gregory (Indiana judge) (1811–1885), American lawyer and politician in the Indiana Senate and on the Indiana Supreme Court
- Robert Gregory (MP for Weymouth and Melcombe Regis) (fl. 1588), MP for Weymouth and Melcombe Regis (UK Parliament constituency)
- Robert Gregory (MP) (1729–1810), English politician
- Robert John Gregory (born 1936), Member South Australian House of Assembly, electorate of Florey, 1982–1993

== Others ==
- Robert Gregory, CEO of the Australian Jewish Association
- Robert Gregory (priest) (1819–1911), former Dean of St Paul's
- Robert Gregory (RFC officer) (1881–1918), Irish cricketer and artist
- Robert Gregory (sprinter) (born 2001), American sprinter

== See also ==
- Bob Gregory (disambiguation)
- Robert Gregor (born 1957), American football player
- Roberta Gregory (born 1953), American comic book writer and artist
