= Chelsea Potter =

Pub in London

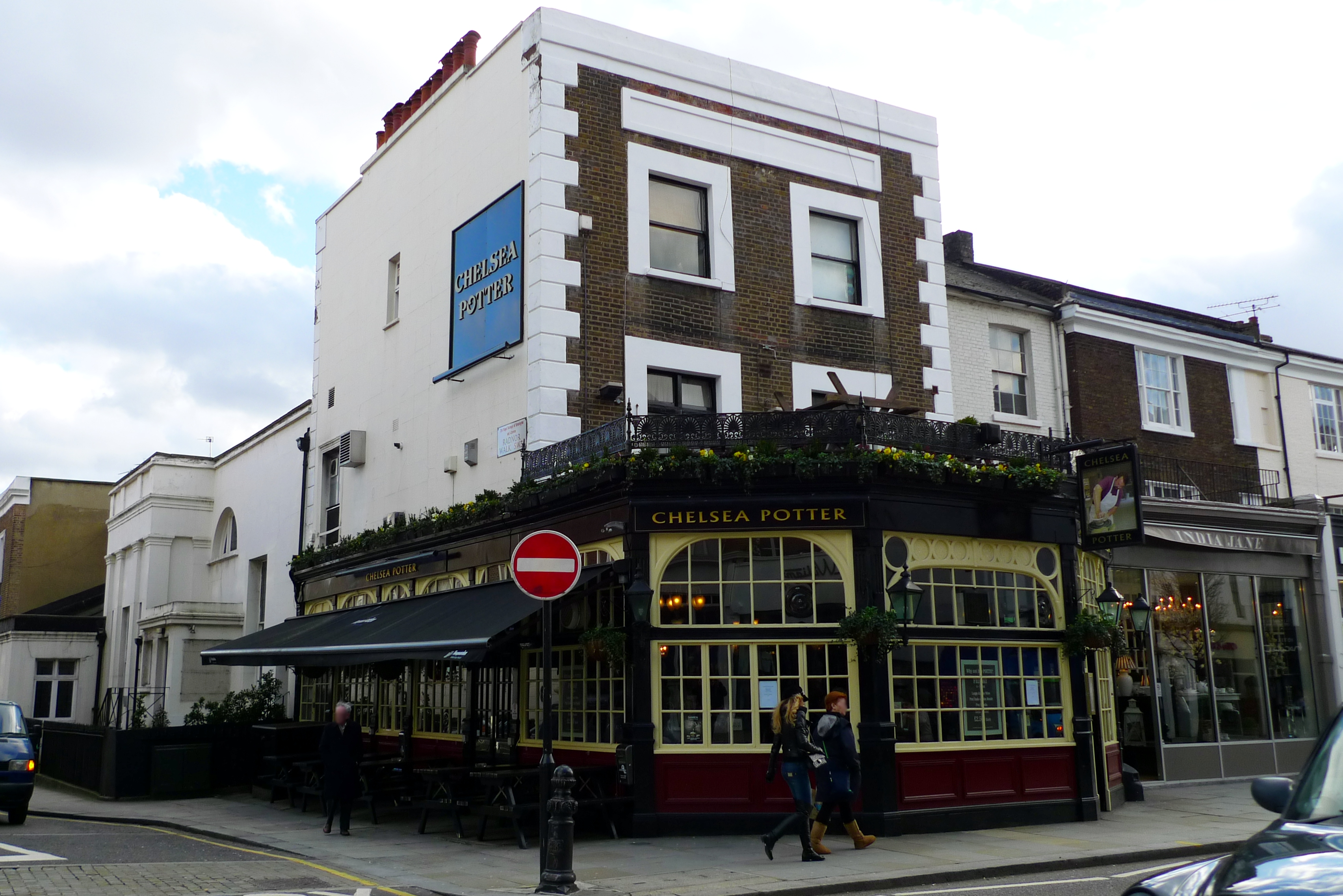
- Chelsea Potter, 2010

- Location within Royal Borough of Kensington and Chelsea Location within Greater London

General information
- Location: 119 King's Road, Chelsea, London, London, England
- Coordinates: 51.4885°N 0.1659°W

The Chelsea Potter is a pub at 119 King's Road, Chelsea, London.

== History ==
It was built in 1842, sited on the corner of Kings Road and Radnor Walk and originally called the Commercial Tavern it was renamed in 1958 in honour of the Chelsea Pottery located at 13 to 15 Radnor Walk and founded by David Rawnsley in 1952. The Chelsea Pottery was subsequently run for 40 years by Brian Hubbard For many years the pub sign showed a potter 'throwing a pot' on a wheel, one of the main techniques used at the Chelsea Pottery in producing its wares.

The assertion that the Chelsea Potter was named after William de Morgan was first seen in a Taylor Walker website in 2015, possibly in ignorance of the recent existence of the Chelsea Pottery just 50 Yards from the pub's site.

It is not clear why the Commercial Tavern would in 1958 be renamed after a pottery further away from the pub site than the Chelsea Pottery. The Commercial Tavern had never previously been named after William de Morgan's pottery which had closed in 1907.

British History Online notes that "the Chelsea Potter became famous in the 1960s and 70s", and regular customers included Jimi Hendrix and The Rolling Stones.

The track "Flying Junk", on the album The Original Soundtrack by British band 10cc, contains the line "He pushed his load down the Kings Road to the Chelsea Potter".
