= Jecon Gregory =

Itinerant artist

Jecon Gregory is or was a nomadic artist, whose autobiographical fragments and poems, dictated to an acquaintance, were published as the book History of a Nation of One: An Unlikely Memoir (Harcourt Brace, New York, 1969, and Michael Joseph, London, 1971). Jecon apparently did not know his place, date, language or even name of birth, began his wanderings as a child in Malta; walked through many lands, barefoot, tall and thin, pulling all his possessions in a basket on wheels, sleeping on the ground, and making a living by drawing portraits.
