= Richard I. Gregory =

Richard I. Gregory is Professor in the Departments of Biological Chemistry and Molecular Pharmacology, and Pediatrics at Harvard Medical School, and Principal Investigator in The Stem Cell Program in the Division of Hematology/Oncology at Boston Children's Hospital. He is also Principal faculty member of The Harvard Stem Cell Institute, and a 2008 Pew Scholar.

He received a PhD from Cambridge University, UK in 2001, studying genomic imprinting at the Babraham Institute. Gregory performed his postdoctoral work at the Fox Chase Cancer Center and the Wistar Institute, Philadelphia. His postdoctoral research focused on mechanisms of miRNA biogenesis and function, and was supported by a Jane Coffin Childs Research Fellowship.
