= Scott Gregory =

Scott Gregory may refer to:

- Scott Gregory (ice skater)
- Scott Gregory (golfer)
- Scott Gregory (rugby union)
