= Danny Flaherty =

Australian rules footballer

Personal information
- Full name: Hugh James Flaherty
- Born: 19 March 1873; Sandridge, Victoria
- Died: 10 October 1901 (aged 28); Melbourne Hospital, Melbourne, Victoria
- Original team: Port Melbourne
- Height: 177 cm (5 ft 10 in)
- Weight: 81 kg (179 lb)

Playing career^{1}
Years	Club	Games (Goals)
1890–1892	Port Melbourne (VFA)	31 (5)
1893–1896	Collingwood (VFA)	53 (10)
1897	Collingwood	4 (0)
Total		88 (15)
- ^{1} Playing statistics correct to the end of 1897.

Danny Flaherty (19 March 1873 – 10 October 1901) was an Australian rules footballer who played with Collingwood in the VFA and Victorian Football League (VFL).

== Family ==
The youngest son of Hugh James Flaherty (-1893), and Bridget Flaherty, née Toohey, Hugh James Flaherty was born at Sandridge, Victoria (now known as Port Melbourne) on 19 March 1873.

== Death ==
He died (suddenly) of pneumonia at the Melbourne Hospital on 10 October 1901.
