= Nuala Gregory =

Irish New Zealand artist and academic

Academic background
- Education: Ulster University, University of Auckland
- Thesis: The Afterlife of Painting (2015)
- Doctoral advisor: Peter Shand, Jan Bryant

Nuala A. Gregory is an Irish–New Zealand artist and academic, and is a full professor at the University of Auckland, and Dean of the Faculty of Creative Arts and Industries. Gregory works mainly in acrylics and collage.

== Early life and education ==
Gregory was born in West Belfast, and is an Irish Catholic. Her parents were working class, and lived in the conflict zone. After graduating from Ulster University with a Bachelor of Arts in 1988, Gregory spent ten years as part of an arts collective. She then applied for teaching positions in England, Scotland and New Zealand, due to lack of local opportunities, and The Troubles. She said "I always felt the need to get out of that environment, because you couldn’t thrive. You could struggle; there was little hope and genuine danger." Gregory secured a part-time teaching position at Elam School of Fine Arts at the University of Auckland in 1997, and was promoted to full-time senior lecturer and Head of Painting the following year. She completed a Master of Fine Arts in 2002, and then a PhD titled The Afterlife of Painting at the University of Auckland in 2015.

== Academic career ==
Gregory was promoted to Dean of the Faculty of Creative Arts and Industries in 2022, and also to full professor. Gregory is a part of the Creative Thinking Project, an Auckland-based initiative aiming to foster and promote creativity in New Zealand. Gregory has been awarded a University of Auckland Distinguished Teaching Award.

== Art ==
Gregory was taught to sew by her mother, and she and her sister would create collages on their bedheads from old newspapers and spit. A pop-up show of Gregory's in 2021, at Starta Kitchen in Auckland, featured a collection of brightly-coloured collages made from acrylic-painted paper, influenced by the collages she made as a child. Gregory also produces drawings and prints.

Besides New Zealand, Gregory's work has been exhibited in Ireland, Mexico, Japan, China and the USA.

== Selected works ==
=== Exhibitions ===
- Nuala Gregory, Exploded View, exhibition at Gus Fisher Gallery, Auckland, 2010
- Nuala Gregory + Starta Bread Kitchen, pop-up Solander Gallery exhibition, 2021
- Nuala Gregory, Any Coloured Thing, Golden Thread Gallery, Belfast, 7 June to 23 June 2012

=== Articles ===
- Nuala Gregory (2014). "All Things Out of Rule". Educational Philosophy and Theory. 47 (6): 563–578. doi:10.1080/00131857.2014.964163. Wikidata Q124650908.
- Nuala Gregory (2017). "Encountering drawing". Educational Philosophy and Theory. 49 (13): 1236–1245. doi:10.1080/00131857.2017.1336919. Wikidata Q124650909.
