= Howie Gregory =

American baseball player (1886–1970)

- Pitcher
- Born: November 18, 1886; Hannibal, Missouri, U.S.
- Died: May 30, 1970 (aged 83); Tulsa, Oklahoma, U.S.
- Batted: Left Threw: Right

MLB debut
- April 16, 1911, for the St. Louis Browns

Last MLB appearance
- May 6, 1911, for the St. Louis Browns

MLB statistics
- Win–loss record: 0–1
- Earned run average: 5.14
- Strikeouts: 1
- Stats at Baseball Reference

Teams
- St. Louis Browns (1911)

Howard Watterson Gregory (November 18, 1886 – May 30, 1970) was an American Major League Baseball pitcher. Gregory played for the St. Louis Browns in 1911.
