= Howard Gregory (footballer) =

English footballer

Personal information
- Full name: Howard Gregory
- Date of birth: 6 April 1893
- Place of birth: Aston Manor, England
- Date of death: 1954 (aged 60–61)
- Position: Winger

Senior career*
Years	Team	Apps	(Gls)
1909–1910	Aston Manor		
1910–1911	Birchfield Trinity		
1911–1925	West Bromwich Albion	162	(39)
Total		162	(39)
- * Club domestic league appearances and goals

Howard Gregory (6 April 1893 – 1954) was an English footballer who played in the Football League for West Bromwich Albion.
