= William Gregory (Carmelite) =

William Gregory (fl. 1520) was a Scottish Carmelite.

Gregory studied at Montagu College, Paris, and in 1499 became a Carmelite of the congregation of Albi; he afterwards became prior of his order successively at Melun, Albi, and Toulouse, and vicar-general of the congregation at Albi. He was made (28 December 1516) a doctor of the Sorbonne, and confessor to Francis I. Bale says he was living at Toulouse in 1528. Numerous works, chiefly theological, are ascribed to him; the first words of some of them are given by Bale and other writers. According to De Villiers, one of his works, ‘Funerale & Processionale secundum usum Carmelitarum,’ 8vo, was printed at Toulouse in 1518.
