= Joseph T. Gregory =

American paleontologist

Joseph Tracy Gregory
- Born: July 28, 1914; Eureka, California
- Died: November 18, 2007 (aged 93)
- Education: University of California
- Known for: Paleontological record of the Western United States
- Scientific career
- Fields: Paleontology
- Workplaces: University of California at Berkeley

Dr. Joseph Tracy Gregory (July 28, 1914 – November 18, 2007) was an American paleontologist and professor.

Joseph Tracy Gregory was born in Eureka, California, the only child of Frank Gregory, a civil engineer, and Edith Tracy, a high school teacher. He grew up in Berkeley, California and continued with his college education there, graduating from the University of California with an A.B. in 1935, and receiving his doctorate in 1938. During World War II, he served as a lieutenant in the Army Air Forces in the weather service.

== Paleontology ==
After the war, he became Assistant Professor of Geology at Yale University, as well as Curator of Vertebrate Paleontology at the Peabody Museum of Natural History. In 1960, he moved to the University of California at Berkeley, where he was Professor of Vertebrate Paleontology, eventually retiring in 1979 as Emeritus Professor.

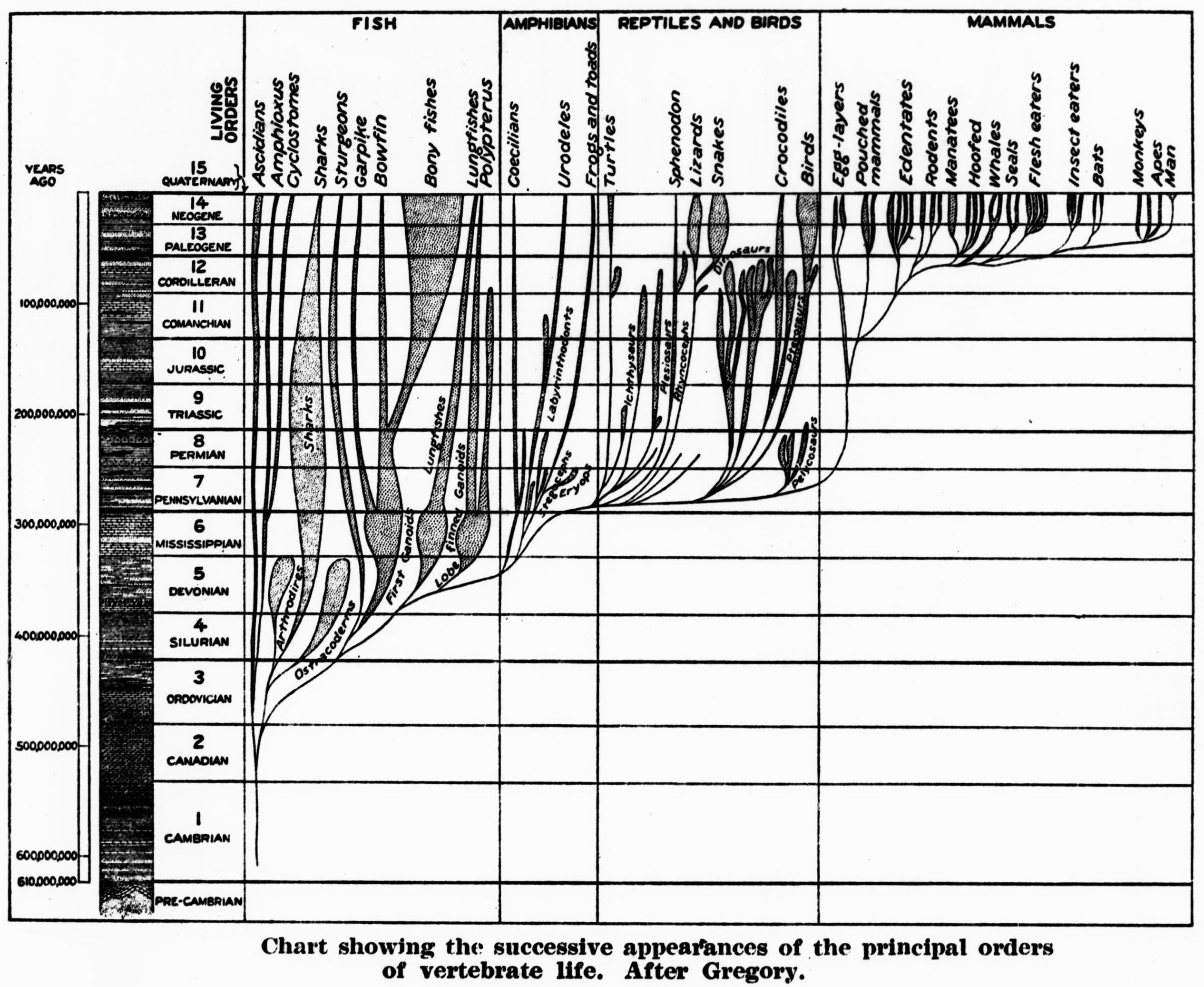
Charts showing the successive appearances of the principal orders of vertebrate life

He was especially active in researching the paleontological record of the Western United States. In his later career, he gained notice as the primary editor of the annual "Bibliography of Vertebrate Paleontology."

The Society of Vertebrate Paleontology's Joseph T. Gregory Award is given annually since 1992 for “contributions to the welfare of Vertebrate Paleontology.”

== Family ==
He married Jane Everest in 1949. They had two children, Carl Douglas Gregory (1950- ) and Sarah Jane Gregory (1953-2006).
