= Matthew Gregory (politician, died 1779) =

Jamaican-born planter, politician and physician (1693–1779)

Dr Matthew Gregory
- Born: 1 January 1693; St Catherine Parish, Colony of Jamaica
- Died: 31 December 1779 (aged 86); Colony of Jamaica
- Occupations: planter, physician, politician
- Known for: being one of Jamaica’s most prominent slave-owners,

Matthew Gregory (1693–1779) was a plantation magnate and politician in Jamaica who sat in the House of Assembly of Jamaica for Saint James Parish in 1718 and 1722, and for Saint Ann in 1726. He also worked as a physician.

Gregory inherited the Swansey Estate in St. Thomas, Jamaica, named "Hordley" in homage to their ancestral home. He was a brother of John Gregory. Gregory died at age 86. According to the University College London, he owned 713 slaves at the time of his death. Hordley was inherited many years later by Matthew Gregory Lewis, his great-grandson, who recounted his experiences as the estate owner in his book titled Journal of a West India Proprietor.
