= William Gregory (fl. 1406) =

English politician

William Gregory (fl. 1406–1414) of Surrey was an English politician.

Nothing is recorded of his family.

He was a Member (MP) of the Parliament of England for Guildford in 1406.
