= Bob Gregory (cricketer) =

English cricketer

Cricket information
- Batting: Right-handed
- Bowling: Right-arm leg-break

Career statistics
Competition	First-class
Matches	430
Runs scored	19,495
Batting average	34.32
100s/50s	39/98
Top score	243
Balls bowled	36,434
Wickets	437
Bowling average	32.31
5 wickets in innings	11
10 wickets in match	1
Best bowling	6/21
Catches/stumpings	300/–
- Source: CricketArchive, 28 May 2022

Robert James Gregory (26 August 1902 – 6 October 1973) was an English first-class cricketer. Born in Selsdon, Surrey, he was an all-rounder who played for Surrey County Cricket Club from 1925 to 1947. He was an attractive right-handed batsman, a leg-break bowler and a fine fielder in the deep. He toured India in 1933–34, but was not selected for any of the Tests.

Despite losing six seasons to World War II, he made 19,495 runs in first-class cricket, at an average of 34.32. He scored 39 centuries, with the highest being 243 against Somerset at The Oval in 1938. He often opened the innings from the mid-1930s onwards. He scored over 2,000 runs in both 1934 and 1937.

He took 437 wickets at 32.31, with best innings figures of 6/21 against Worcestershire at The Oval in 1932 . He once took ten wickets in a match: five in each innings against Middlesex at Lord's in 1930. During his career he held 300 catches.

Gregory died at Wandsworth in London in 1973 aged 71.
