= James Gregory (mineralogist) =

British mineralogist

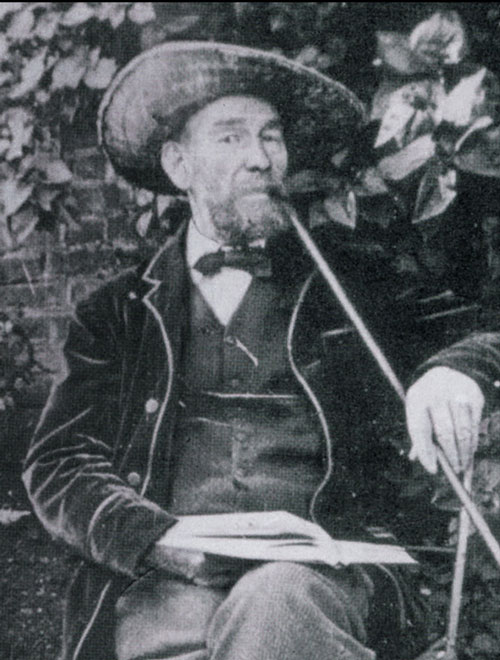
James R. Gregory, circa 1880

James Reynolds Gregory (29 December 1832 – 15 December 1899) was a noted 19th-century British mineralogist. He founded a mineral specimen business in 1858 which is today known as Gregory, Bottley & Lloyd. Gregory's company had a reputation as one of the best in the business providing mineral samples for scientists as well as private collectors. He primarily bought his specimens at auction or from other collectors and dealers, rarely collecting from the field.

When he was sent in 1868 by diamond merchant Harry Emmanuel of London's Hatton Garden to Hopetown, South Africa, to determine if claims of diamonds being found there were true, he investigated and reported back, that "The whole story of the Cape diamond discoveries is false, and is simply one of the many schemes for trying to promote the employment and expenditure of capital in searching for this pereachous [sic] substance in the colony".

He concluded by saying that any genuine diamonds had most likely been swallowed and excreted by wandering ostriches "from a far-distant region".

However, shortly thereafter, experts pronounced a stone that he had dismissed to be a "magnificent white diamond weighing 83½ carats" (16.7 g). This stone was to be known as the Star of South Africa, also known as the Dudley diamond.

The affair proved extremely embarrassing for him. For a number of years thereafter any lie or mis-statement about a diamond was dismissed as a "Gregory".
