= James Gregory (comedian) =

American comedian (1946–2024)

- Publicity Photo of James Gregory
- Born: May 6, 1946; Lithonia, Georgia, U.S.
- Died: May 9, 2024 (aged 78); Woodstock, Georgia, U.S.

Comedy career
- Medium: Stand-up comedy, writing
- Genre: Stand-up comedy
- Subject: Observational comedy
- Website: funniestman.com

James Harold Gregory, Jr. (May 6, 1946 – May 9, 2024) was an American stand-up comedian.

== Life and career ==
Gregory was born in Lithonia, Georgia, on May 6, 1946, and worked as a salesman until he was 36, when he began introducing performers at The Punch Line comedy club in Atlanta. His first feature act at the Punch Line was February 17, 1982.

Some of his most notable works include an album and a book titled It Could Be A Law, I Don't Know and a video called Grease, Gravy & John Wayne's Momma. Gregory's style consisted of storytelling.

Gregory appeared regularly as a guest on several syndicated radio shows, including the John Boy and Billy Show, Rick and Bubba, the Bob and Tom Show, and Steve and DC.

Gregory died from cardiac complications on May 9, 2024, three days after his 78th birthday.

== Albums ==
- "It Could Be a Law, I Don't Know!" The Funniest Man in America (1991) (Epic Records)
