= Anthony Karl Gregory =

Icelandic footballer

Personal information
- Date of birth: 6 July 1966 (age 60)
- Position: Striker

Senior career*
Years	Team	Apps	(Gls)
1985–1987	Valur	9	(0)
1988–1989	KA	36	(14)
1990–1993	Valur	67	(32)
1994	Bodø/Glimt	7	(2)
1995–1996	Breiðablik	22	(4)
1996–1997	Valur	13	(4)
1998	UMF Selfoss	6	(4)
Total		160	(60)

International career
1990–1991	Iceland	5	(2)
- * Club domestic league appearances and goals

Anthony Karl Gregory (born 6 July 1966) is an Icelandic retired football striker.

== International career ==
Gregory was born in Iceland to an African-American father and Icelandic mother. He made his debut for Iceland in an August 1990 friendly match away against the Faroe Islands, in which he scored two goals, and has earned a total of 5 caps, scoring 2 goals. His final international was a May 1991 European Championship qualification match against Albania.
