= Joe Gregory (trade union leader) =

British trade union leader

Joseph F. Gregory (1862 – 3 November 1926) was a British trade union leader.

Born in London, Gregory undertook an apprenticeship as a stonemason at Caldecote in Warwickshire. He successfully completed this, and then joined the Operative Stonemasons' Society. Early in the 1880s, he was appointed as the union's representative on the Leicester Building Trades Council, and this started a rapid rise to prominence, as Gregory won election to the union's executive, and then as its president.

In 1890, Gregory moved back to London, and was chosen to represent his union on the London Trades Council. He served as chair of the union around the turn of the century, and represented the council on the London County Council's Technical Education Board.

Gregory was elected as the general secretary of the National League of the Blind in 1904, and held the post until his death, late in 1926.

Trade union offices
Preceded by Ben Cooper	Chairman of the London Trades Council; 1899–1904	Succeeded by Harry Quelch
Preceded by William Banham	General Secretary of the National League of the Blind; 1904–1926	Succeeded by Alec Henderson
