= Tony Gregory (footballer) =

English footballer, coach, and manager (1937–2021)

Anthony Charles Gregory (16 May 1937 – January 2021) was an English football player, coach and manager. He played as a wing half and as a winger.

== Career ==
During his career he played for Vauxhall Motors, Luton Town, Watford, Bexley United, Bedford Town, Hastings United and Dover. He also served as a player-coach for Hamilton Steelers and Barnet, and as player-manager for Stevenage Town and Wolverton.

During his career, Gregory represented his country at youth level, was a losing finalist with Luton in the 1959 FA Cup Final, and helped Watford to promotion in the 1959–60 season.

On 12 January 2021, it was announced that he had died at the age of 83.

== Honours ==
Luton Town

- FA Cup runner-up: 1958–59
