= Anthony Gregory =

American historian and author (born 1981)

Anthony Gregory (born January 3, 1981) is an American historian and author. He has published two books on civil liberties in the United States and in the English legal tradition. Prior to becoming an academic historian, Gregory published hundreds of essays during his tenure as a research fellow at the Independent Institute, a libertarian think tank in the United States.

== Education ==
Gregory received his B.A. (2003), M.A. (2015), and Ph.D. (2020) degrees in history at University of California, Berkeley. His doctoral dissertation was entitled "From War on Crime to Liberal Security State: The New Deal and American Political Legitimacy."

== Advocacy work ==
Gregory's political views were influenced by those of his parents. His father was an anti-war conservative who voted for George McGovern instead of Richard Nixon because of the latter's support for the Vietnam War; his mother was an anti-Communist immigrant from Korea. Gregory says he became an anarchist in college, after seeing what he considered to be government bungling of its key function of national security during and after the September 11 attacks in 2001.

=== Humane treatment of US prisoners ===
In an interview, Gregory identified prisons as an important political issue that libertarians at large have tended not to care about as much as he thinks they should. Gregory's chief criticisms include the imprisonment of non-violent drug offenders, the imprisonment of innocent people due to low evidentiary standards, and the use of methods of imprisonment that are tantamount to torture.

=== Foreign policy ===
On foreign policy, Gregory is a proponent of non-interventionism and is critical of neoconservatism.

He has been critical of the Iraq War and other recent international war-like involvement by the United States. Gregory's views on the Iraq War were included in a Reason Magazine summary of libertarian thoughts on the Iraq War 10 years after the beginning of the war.

Gregory has been critical of conscription and expressed skepticism of Andrew Bacevich's argument that conscription would reduce support for war.

=== Free migration ===
Gregory has argued in favor of free migration and also in favor of amnesty for all illegal immigrants in the United States.

== Books ==
Gregory is author of The Power of Habeas Corpus in America (2013, Cambridge University Press for the Independent Institute). The book was reviewed by Jonathan Hafetz for Reason Magazine. It won the 2013 award for best book on Law & Legal Studies in the American Publishers Awards for Professional and Scholarly Excellence.

He is also the author of American Surveillance: Intelligence, Privacy, and the Fourth Amendment (2016, University of Wisconsin Press). In his March 2017 article in Harvard's Business History Review, Josh Lauer summarizes the book's thesis: "Current battles over government spying are clouded by misplaced anxieties and misunderstandings—in particular, confusion about the essential function of government surveillance and the complex legal edifice upon which American privacy rights rest."

Lauer notes that the book questions the ability of any purely legal reform to curb worrisome developments of the modern surveillance state. Lauer takes issue with Gregory's assertion that "[t]he predicament posed by the NSA, modern police power, and the modern administrative state’s multitude of intrusions into private life is not, ultimately, a legal problem. It is a cultural problem, posed to civilization itself."

== Media ==
Gregory was interviewed by Washington Times writer Joseph S. Diedrich about his personal life and his vision for liberty. He has also appeared on Freedom Watch, a show by Judge Andrew Napolitano hosted by the Fox Business Network.
