= John Gregory (cricketer, born 1842) =

English cricketer (1842–1894)

John Constable Gregory (17 August 1842 – 28 June 1894) was an English first-class cricketer active 1865–71 who played for Middlesex and Surrey. He was born in Marylebone and died in Weymouth. He was a righthanded batsman and was the captain of Surrey in 1871. He played in 23 first-class matches.
