= Jack I. Gregory =

U.S. Air Force general (1931–2025)

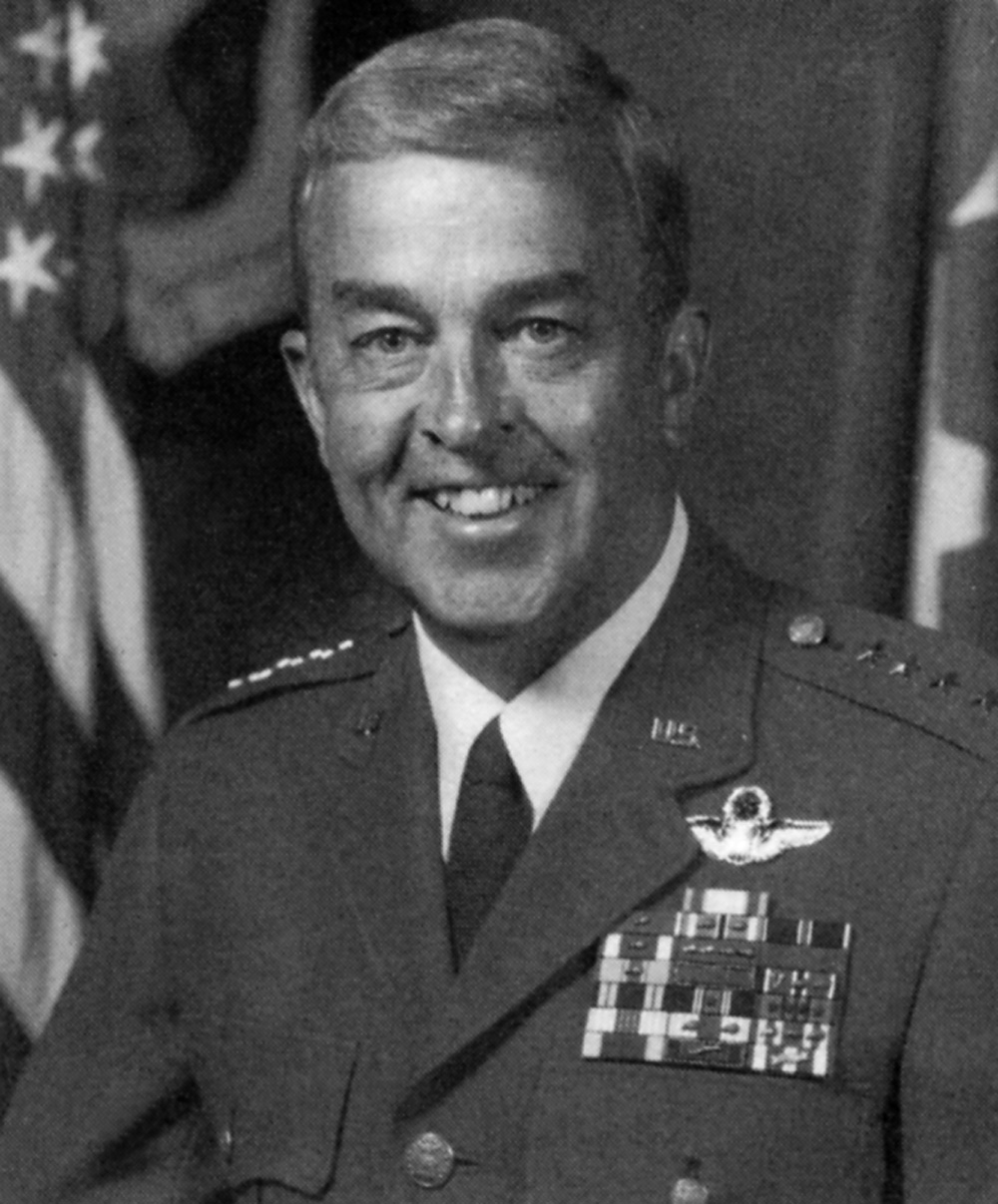
- Official portrait
- Born: July 2, 1931; Somerset, Kentucky, U.S.
- Died: November 27, 2025 (aged 94); Surprise, Arizona, U.S.
- Military career
- Allegiance: United States
- Branch: United States Air Force
- Service years: 1953–1988
- Rank: General
- Commands: 347th Tactical Fighter Wing; United States Air Force Tactical Fighter Weapons Center; 12th Air Force; Deputy Commander United States Forces Korea; Deputy Commander United Nations Command; Republic of Korea and United States Air Component Command; 7th Air Force; Deputy Commander in Chief United Nations Command; Air Component Command; Pacific Air Forces
- Conflicts: Cold War; Korean War; Vietnam War

Jack Irvin Gregory (July 2, 1931 – November 27, 2025) was a general in the United States Air Force and the commander in chief of the Pacific Air Forces.

== Biography ==
=== Early life ===
Jack Irvin Gregory was born in Somerset, Kentucky, on July 2, 1931, where he graduated from Somerset High School in 1949.

In 1952, he earned a Bachelor of Science degree from the University of Kentucky. After college, he convinced his high school sweetheart to marry him, something which he later said was his proudest achievement. He began his military career in June 1953 with a commission as a second lieutenant in the United States Air Force through the Reserve Officer Training Corps program. Gregory entered primary pilot training at Columbus Air Force Base, Mississippi, and received his wings in July 1954 at Greenville Air Force Base, Mississippi. His first operational assignment began in December 1954, when he was assigned to the Far East air forces, flying F-86 Sabres at Suwon Air Base, South Korea, and Misawa Air Base, Japan. Returning to the United States in December 1957, he instructed in F-86s at Perrin Air Force Base, Texas, until August 1963.

After graduation from Air Command and Staff College and a receiving a master's degree in public administration from 1964 from The George Washington University, he was assigned to the 337th Fighter Group, Portland International Airport, Oregon, flying F-102 Delta Daggers. The following year, Gregory was stationed at Davis-Monthan Air Force Base, Arizona, flying F-4C Phantom II's with the 4454th Combat Crew Training Squadron.

In May 1966 he was assigned to the 53rd Tactical Fighter Squadron, Bitburg Air Base, West Germany, as an F-4D Phantom II flight commander. In August 1968 he became operations officer of the 23d Tactical Fighter Squadron at Bitburg and remained in that position when the squadron moved to Spangdahlem Air Base, West Germany.

In September 1969, Gregory transferred to the 13th Tactical Fighter Squadron, Udorn Royal Thai Air Force Base, Thailand, where he served first as operations officer, and then became commander of the F-4D Phantom II combat unit. During this tour of duty, he completed more than 250 combat missions.

From November 1970 to August 1973 he was assigned to Headquarters United States Air Force, Washington D.C., working international political military affairs for Southeast Asia, Office of the Deputy Chief of Staff for Plans and Operations. After graduation from the Air War College in June 1974, Gregory was assigned as deputy commander for operations of the 31st Tactical Fighter Wing, Homestead Air Force Base, Florida, flying F-4E Phantom II's.

=== Later career ===
In July 1975, he became vice commander of the 347th Tactical Fighter Wing at Moody Air Force Base, Georgia, and was named wing commander in August 1976. During this period Gregory led the conversion of that Air Training Command base to a Tactical Air Command asset. Three new F-4E Phantom II tactical fighter squadrons were activated and brought to combat-ready status.

In October 1978, he was assigned to command what is now the 831st Air Division at George Air Force Base, California, where he was responsible for the Wild Weasel air suppression defense flying F-4C Phantom IIs, F-4Es, F-105G Thunderchiefs and F-4Gs. He became assistant deputy chief of staff for operations at Tactical Air Command headquarters, Langley Air Force Base, Virginia, in March 1980 and also served as director of operations for the Air Force Forces of the Rapid Deployment Force.

In June 1981 Gregory transferred to Nellis Air Force Base, Nevada, as commander of the United States Air Force Tactical Fighter Weapons Center. While there, he converted the United States Air Force Air Demonstration Team, the Thunderbirds, to the F-16A/B Fighting Falcons. He also was responsible for the United States Air Force Fighter Weapons School, the Aggressors, Red Flag exercises, fighter testing and tactics development programs, and the operations of A-10 Warthogs, F-15 Eagles, F-16 Fighting Falcons, F-4 Phantom IIs, F-111 Aardvarks, F-5 Freedom Fighters, A-7 Corsair IIs and T-38 Talons.

Gregory became commander of the 12th Air Force at Bergstrom Air Force Base, Texas, in June 1983. In that position he was responsible for 13 tactical wings made up of 50,000 personnel and 1,100 aircraft, including F-4E/G Phantom IIs, F-15A/B Eagles, F-16A/B/C/D Fighting Falcons, F-5B/D/E Freedom Fighters, RF-4C Phantom IIs, A-10 Warthogs, F-111A/D Aardvarks, EF-111 Ravens, T-38 Talons, OA-37 Dragonflys and OV-10 Broncos. He also held advisory, evaluation and inspection responsibilities for Air National Guard and Air Force Reserve Tactical Air Command-gained units, which included an additional 25,000 personnel and 550 aircraft.

In June 1985, he was assigned as the deputy commander, United States Forces Korea, with headquarters in Seoul. He concurrently held the position of deputy commander, United Nations Command; chief of staff of the Republic of Korea and United States Combined Forces Command; commander of the Republic of Korea and United States Air Component Command; and senior United States representative to the committee for the Status of Forces Agreement.

In a realignment in September 1986, he assumed command of the newly activated 7th Air Force at Osan Air Base, Republic of Korea, while also serving as deputy commander, United States Forces Korea; deputy commander in chief, United Nations Command; commander of Air Component Command; and commander of United States Air Forces Korea. He assumed his final command as the commander of the Pacific Air Forces in December 1986. He was promoted to general January 1, 1987, with same date of rank. He retired on August 1, 1988. He received the Order of the Sword on June 21, 1988. His son is the Chief of Staff, Air Force Flight Test Center, Air Force Materiel Command, Edwards Air Force Base, California.

=== Death ===
Gregory died in Surprise, Arizona on November 27, 2025, at the age of 94.

== Awards ==
Awards earned during his career:

- Defense Distinguished Service Medal
- Air Force Distinguished Service Medal
- Legion of Merit with an oak leaf cluster
- Distinguished Flying Cross with two oak leaf clusters
- Bronze Star Medal
- Meritorious Service Medal with an oak leaf cluster
- Air Medal with thirteen oak leaf clusters
- Air Force Commendation Medal with an oak leaf cluster
- Order of the Sword
- Command pilot with more than 7,000 flying hours
