= William Gregory (lord mayor) =

Sir William Gregory

Lord Mayor of London
- In office 1451–1452
- Preceded by: Nicholas Wyfold
- Succeeded by: Geoffrey Fielding

Personal details
- Born: c. 1400 Mildenhall, England
- Died: 1467 London, England
- Children: Two daughters

Sir William Gregory (c. 1400 in Mildenhall – 1467 in London) was Lord Mayor of London from 1451 to 1452.

== Biography ==
The son of Roger Gregory of Mildenhall and an alderman of the Skinners Company, he made generous bequests to the church of Ss Anne and Agnes, Gresham Street, Aldersgate.

He was a wealthy man, and, in 1461, founded a chantry at Ss Anne and Agnes from the rents of some property in the parish which he had purchased from a widow, Margaret Holmehegge, and two other persons. On 6 November 1465, he made his will, by which it appears that he had been three times married (his wives were named Joan, Julian, and Joan respectively), had two daughters and had nine grandchildren at the time of his death in January 1467.

== See also ==
- List of lord mayors of London
