= Jack Gregory (footballer, born 1926) =

English footballer

Personal information
- Full name: John Ernest Gregory
- Date of birth: 24 September 1926
- Place of birth: Shoreditch, London, England
- Date of death: 10 October 1995 (aged 69)
- Place of death: Horsham, England
- Position: Inside forward

Senior career*
Years	Team	Apps	(Gls)
–	Bromley		
1951–1953	West Ham United	24	(6)
1953–1957	Scunthorpe United	147	(63)
1957–1958	Aldershot	6	(2)
1958–19??	St Neots Town		
- * Club domestic league appearances and goals

John Ernest Gregory (24 September 1926 – 10 October 1995) was an English footballer who played as an inside forward in the 1950s. He played in the Football League for West Ham United, Scunthorpe United and Aldershot and in non-league football for Bromley and St Neots Town. He top-scored in his first season with Scunthorpe, and scored more than 20 goals in each of the next two seasons.

Gregory's son John played six times for England and went on to a managerial career.
