= Joseph Gregory (sniper) =

Canadian sniper (1900–1971)

Joseph Arthur Gregory MM (December 1900 – July 1971) was a Canadian sniper during both the First and Second World Wars.

== Early life ==
Gregory was born at St. Laurent, Manitoba, in December 1900, his antecedents included Blackfoot warriors. He concealed his age and at 15 joined the Canadian Overseas Contingent. He served in France and Flanders with the 1st Canadian Mounted Rifles, being wounded at Sanctuary Wood in June 1916, and again at Oppy Wood in March 1918. He remained in hospital until September 1918 and invalided home to Canada.

He told friends he developed his talent for sniping as a boy when he hunted in Saskatchewan. He had the use of a camera during his action in the First World War and had a large collection of photographs documenting the horror he witnessed.

== Second World War ==
After his service in France, Gregory settled in Calgary, Alberta, with his wife and worked as a labourer. Upon the outbreak of the Second World War, he re-enlisted with the newly formed South Saskatchewan Regiment on 7 September 1939 in Weyburn, Saskatchewan.

Credited with several kills, he participated in the Dieppe Raid, where he lost an eye to a ricocheted bullet. His actions earned him the Military Medal "in recognition of gallant and distinguished services in the combined attack on Dieppe". Attached to the battalion headquarters, Gregory had been deployed four times to find enemy snipers shooting into the headquarters.

The original recommendation states:

During recent operations at Dieppe on 19 August 1942, Corporal Gregory was a sniper and scout attached to Battalion Headquarters. On four occasions, although under fire and observation, he made long trips into enemy sniper positions that were causing casualties at Battalion Headquarters. On each occasion he killed the enemy sniper. In between these sorties, Corporal Gregory kept the defences of Battalion Headquarters organised and although he lost an eye during the action, continued with his duties until the final withdrawal to the beach. His courageous devotion to duty was of inestimable value in the defence of Battalion Headquarters.

As a result of his wounds, Gregory was evacuated to Canada in October 1942 where he served for the remainder of the war at the Central Recruiting Station at Calgary, gaining advancement to staff sergeant in June 1945. He was honourably discharged that September.

== Post-war ==
In the mid-1950s he worked at the Royal Canadian Air Force base at Tofino BC and remained in the Tofino area for the rest of his life. He was an avid duck hunter and fly fisherman and taught many people these skills. He died at Calgary in July 1971.

His account of the Dieppe raid appeared in Time magazine's October 26, 1942 issue, and he was also interviewed for the December 1 Hamilton Spectator.

== See also ==
- List of books, articles and documentaries about snipers
