= Jack Gregory (American football guard) =

American football player (1915–2003)

No. 94, 23
- Position: Guard

Personal information
- Born: February 14, 1915; Okolona, Mississippi, U.S.
- Died: November 5, 2003 (aged 88); Okolona, Mississippi, U.S.
- Listed height: 6 ft 2 in (1.88 m)
- Listed weight: 215 lb (98 kg)

Career information
- High school: Okolona
- College: Alabama; Chattanooga
- NFL draft: 1940: 13th round, 115th overall pick

Career history
- Cincinnati Bengals (1940); Cleveland Rams (1941)

Awards and highlights
- First-team Little All-American (1939)

Career NFL statistics
- Games played: 7
- Stats at Pro Football Reference

Earl Jackson "Big Bubba" Gregory (February 14, 1915 – November 5, 2003) was an American professional football guard.

== Football career ==
He played college football at the University of Alabama before transferring to the University of Tennessee at Chattanooga and was selected as a first-team tackle on the Associated Press Little All-America team in 1939. He played professional football in the National Football League (NFL) for the Cleveland Rams. He appeared in seven NFL games during the 1941 season. After retiring from football, he worked as a cattleman, farmer, and landowner. He was named to the University of Chattanooga All Century football team and was a charter member of the school's Sports Hall of Fame.

He died in 2003 at age 88.
