= Stephen Gregory (author) =

British writer (1950–2024)

Stephen Gregory (1952–2024) was a Welsh author of horror fiction. He was born in Derby, England in 1952. He had a degree in law from the University of London, and worked as a teacher in various places, including Bangor in Wales, Algiers in Algeria and the Sudan. Gregory lived in Hollywood, California for a time, where he worked as a script writer with William Friedkin at Paramount Pictures.

On 14 January 2024, his publisher announced his death.

== Works ==
His works include:

- The Cormorant, 1986 (reissued in 2013 by Valancourt Books, new introduction by the author)
- The Woodwitch, 1988 (reissued in 2014 by Valancourt Books, new introduction by Paul G. Tremblay)
- The Blood of Angels, 1993 (reissued in 2015 by Valancourt Books, new introduction by Mark Morris)
- The Perils and Dangers of This Night, 2008
- The Waking that Kills, 2013
- Wakening the Crow, 2014
- Plague of Gulls, 2015

The Cormorant received the 1987 Somerset Maugham Award, and, in 1993, the BBC made it into a film, starring Ralph Fiennes, which won two BAFTA Cymru awards. All three books were published both in the UK and US as well as in foreign translations.
