= John Gregory (cricketer, born 1887) =

English cricketer and British Army soldier

Personal information
- Full name: John Thomas Gregory
- Born: 22 April 1887; Sutton-in-Ashfield, Nottinghamshire, England
- Died: 27 October 1914 (aged 27) near Zonnebeke, West Flanders, Belgium
- Batting: Left-handed
- Bowling: Slow left-arm orthodox

Domestic team information
- Years: Team
- 1913: Hampshire

Career statistics
Competition	First-class
Matches	1
Runs scored	0
Batting average	0.00
100s/50s	–/–
Top score	0
Balls bowled	144
Wickets	0
Bowling average	–
5 wickets in innings	–
10 wickets in match	–
Best bowling	–
Catches/stumpings	–/–
- Source: Cricinfo, 26 January 2010

John Thomas Gregory (22 April 1887 – 27 October 1914) was an English first-class cricketer and British Army soldier.

The son of Thomas Gregory, a club cricketer, and his wife, Eliza, he was born at Sutton-in-Ashfield in April 1887. Between 1905 and 1907, he spent time on the ground staff at Trent Bridge, but did not play for Nottinghamshire. After leaving Trent Bridge, he played club cricket for the New Hucknall Colliery Cricket Club, and subsequently enlisted in the King's Royal Rifle Corps as a private. It was while garrisoned at Aldershot that he came to the attention of Hampshire while playing for his regiment, having taken all 10 wickets of the 2nd Worcestershire Regiment innings for the cost of 15 runs with his slow left-arm orthodox bowling. On the back of this performance, he was subsequently selected to play for Hampshire, making what would be his only appearance in first-class cricket against Oxford University at Southampton in 1913. Batting once in the match, he was dismissed without scoring in Hampshire's first innings by Denis Wigan; with the ball, he bowled 24 wicket-less overs across both of Oxford's innings'. In addition to playing cricket, Gregory also played football for the British Army football team against the England national amateur football team.

Gregory served in the First World War with the 1st Battalion, King's Royal Rifle Corps. He fought on the Western Front during the early days of the war and was killed in action at Polygon Wood near Zonnebeke on 27 October 1914, that same day that Prince Maurice of Battenberg, also a member of the 1st Battalion and a grandson of Queen Victoria, was killed. His body was never recovered, but he was commemorated on the Menin Gate Memorial.
