= Matt Gregory (hiker) =

American hiker (born 1978)

Matt Gregory (born November 28, 1978) walked nearly 5,000 miles from Bellingham, Washington to Key West, Florida in 2006 and 2007 to raise money for the Fred Hutchinson Cancer Research Center. He left Bellingham on September 1, 2006 and landed in Key West on November 8, 2007. Along the way, he stayed with nearly a hundred strangers.

== Hiking ==
Several years after hiking across the country, Gregory took a 200-mile hike with his pet goat, Vickie. He left Bellingham, Washington on September 1, 2010 and the hike ended on October 16, 2010 in Winlock, Washington. The hike was ended after the goat's second trip to the emergency room.

Gregory's second and smaller hike with the goat raised $3,126 for Fred Hutchinson Cancer Research Center.

He was also part of the Crack the Curse hike, which was five guys and a goat hiking from Mesa, Arizona to Chicago. They raised over $30,000 for cancer research as they attempted to break the curse of the billy goat for the Chicago Cubs.

== Personal life ==
Gregory was prematurely born because his mother had leukemia. She had a bone marrow transplant several months later in 1979 and lived for another 20 years.

== See also ==
- List of people who have walked across the United States
