= Bruce Gregory (Australian footballer) =

Australian rules footballer, born 1915

Personal information
- Full name: Bruce Gregory
- Born: 10 July 1915
- Died: 7 July 1998 (aged 82)
- Original team: Coburg
- Height: 177 cm (5 ft 10 in)
- Weight: 79 kg (174 lb)

Playing career^{1}
Years	Club	Games (Goals)
1937	North Melbourne	1 (0)
- ^{1} Playing statistics correct to the end of 1937.

Bruce Gregory (10 July 1915 – 7 July 1998) was an Australian rules footballer who played with North Melbourne in the Victorian Football League (VFL).
