= Johnny Gregory (footballer) =

Australian rules footballer, born 1905

Personal information
- Full name: John James "Johnny" Gregory
- Born: 16 February 1905
- Died: 9 October 1992 (aged 87)
- Original team: North Melbourne Jnrs
- Height: 175 cm (5 ft 9 in)
- Weight: 76 kg (168 lb)

Playing career^{1}
Years	Club	Games (Goals)
1926–1935	North Melbourne	156 (5)
- ^{1} Playing statistics correct to the end of 1935.

John James Gregory (16 February 1905 – 9 October 1992) was an Australian rules footballer who played with North Melbourne in the Victorian Football League (VFL).

Gregory, who played his football as a half-back flanker, was a North Melbourne junior. He had his best season in 1931 when he polled 10 Brownlow Medal votes and the following year represented the VFL.

He was the first ever North Melbourne footballer to play 150 games for the club. During that time he appeared in only 24 wins.
