= The Open Notebook =

Non-profit science journalism organization

- Abbreviation: TON
- Formation: 2010; 16 years ago
- Founder: Siri Carpenter; Jeanne Erdmann
- Founded at: Madison, Wisconsin
- Type: Non-profit NGO
- Legal status: Non-profit
- Services: Publishes articles, books, and other resources on science journalism craft; Offers training and mentoring programs
- Leader: Siri Carpenter
- Board of directors: Siri Carpenter (Executive Director); Jane C. Hu (Chair); Sisi Wei (Vice Chair); Shraddha Chakradhar (Treasurer); María Paula Rubiano A. (Secretary); Heidi Flood; Will Lager; Ashley Smart
- Website: theopennotebook.com

The Open Notebook (TON) is a non-profit journalism support organization and online magazine. Its purpose is to equip journalists to cover science, health, and the environment. It publishes resources on the craft of science writing and offers training, mentoring, and community-support programs. The Open Notebook is supported by foundation grants and individual donations, and also partners with journalism and science communication organizations, scientific societies, philanthropies, and universities.

== Description ==
The Open Notebook is a 501(c)(3) non-profit organization founded in 2010 by science journalists Siri Carpenter and Jeanne Erdmann.

Initially, it published "story-behind-the-story" interviews with journalists about the genesis and development of specific published pieces of science journalism. Subjects of interviews at The Open Notebook have included Rebecca Skloot, Kathryn Schulz, Ed Yong, Mary Heglar, Elizabeth Kolbert, Steve Silberman, Adriana Gallardo, Carl Zimmer, Ankita Rao, Nicola Twilley, David Quammen, Christie Aschwanden, Elizabeth Shogren, Natalie Wolchover, Seth Mnookin, Cynthia Graber, Gabriel Mac, Karen Hao, Jamie Lauren Keiles, and David Quammen.

In 2011, Carpenter and Erdmann expanded the project to include a pitch database, an advice column, and articles on topics such as structuring narrative feature articles, finding and sharpening story ideas, taking good notes as a reporter, and pitching story ideas to editors. By 2025, The Open Notebook had grown to publish hundreds of articles and two books. It offers online courses; training workshops for journalists and scientists; tip sheets and interactive tools for journalists on any beat; online communities of practice for local journalists, international students, and journalists from underrepresented communities; and a global database of science writers. Knight Science Journalism at MIT wrote of the organization:

Since 2010, The Open Notebook project has been providing educational tools and resources to sharpen the professional skills of science journalists at all experience levels. It's home to detailed interviews with science journalists who dissect their own story-creation process, deep reported features on the challenges of the craft, "day in the life" features where science journalists share their habits and tricks, and even an advice column and a pitch database giving examples of successful feature queries.

Gary Price of Library Journal said The Open Notebook "provides unique tools and resources to help science journalists at all experience levels hone their craft". Spencer Davis of The Freelancer by Contently said TON's site "was built for science journalists in particular, but many of the site's resources are just as applicable to all freelance writers".

Tara Haelle of the Association of Health Care Journalists wrote, "Perhaps the best science journalism site/blog out there is The Open Notebook, chock full of advice, tips, guides and inspiration." She listed the organization of topics on the site: "Breaking In; Finding Ideas; Pitching; Story Planning and Reporting; Writing Accurately, Clearly and Engagingly; Fact-Checking, Self-Editing and Revising; The Business and Economics of Freelancing; Being Part of the Science Journalism World; and Looking for Inspiration?"

David Dobbs, writing in Wired, called TON "The wonderful shop-talk site for science writers."

"...The Open Notebook [is] a primary resource for science journalists. It offers a primer on how to report and write about science, including how to read a scientific paper and how to explain complex concepts and processes clearly."

— Quill, A Magazine by the Society of Professional Journalists

=== Articles on science writing craft ===
The Open Notebook publishes articles focused on elements of science writing and editing craft. Topics include reporting on risk, reading scientific papers, covering preprint manuscripts, writing about disability, making freedom-of-information requests, being a science writer and managing a mental illness, finding and pitching stories to editors, negotiating freelance rates, and interviewing sources about trauma.

The Open Notebook partnered in 2016 with the Council for the Advancement of Science Writing (CASW) to co-publish Storygrams, a series of annotated articles analyzing exceptional qualities of notable science stories. Each piece in the series includes an in-depth embedded analysis of the story and an accompanying interview with its author. Undark summarized the project, "The Storygrams project from The Open Notebook aims to highlight what makes the best science writing stand out." Articles examined through this series include works originally published in The New Yorker, The New York Times, National Geographic, Nature, The Atlantic, The New Republic, and other media outlets.

=== Spanish translations ===
In 2019, The Open Notebook began translating some of its reported features into Spanish. The TON en Español Spanish translation series includes more than 100 articles such as reporting on preprint manuscripts, spotting shady statistics in scientific papers, solutions journalism for science reporters, and the shortage of Spanish-language science journalism in the U.S.

=== Writer profiles ===
In the "A Day in the Life" series, The Open Notebook publishes brief profiles of working science journalists. In the series, writers and editors describe where they work, their favorite productivity and note-taking tools, their reading habits, and other aspects of their daily working routines. Spencer Davis wrote that the series "resembles the New York Times' s 'By the Book' column—which interviews famous personalities on their reading and writing habits—but with a focus on journalists". Writers profiled through this series have included science journalists such as Maryn McKenna, Virginia Hughes, Nadia Drake, Amy Maxmen, Helen Ouyang, Anahad O'Connor, and Rhitu Chatterjee.

=== Training and mentoring ===
The Open Notebook conducts workshops and trainings for journalists, newsrooms, and scientists. Training for journalists emphasizes topics such as evaluating scientific evidence and interviewing experts, while programs for researchers focus on skills for sharing work with public audiences and working with the media.

TON’s Science Journalism Master Classes, free courses delivered by email, cover core skills such as pitching, finding story angles, and identifying scientific misinformation.

It also offers various mentoring initiatives. Its Early-Career Fellowship Program is a 12-month, part-time remote program where participants work with mentors to report and write articles for the TON website. The Sharon Dunwoody Science Journalism Mentoring Program is a cohort-based initiative aimed at supporting journalists from underrepresented communities. The International Students Slack Community provides a space for aspiring and early-career international science writers to discuss educational opportunities, visa issues, and career development challenges.

=== Resources for Local Journalists ===
The Open Notebook provides resources for local and general-assignment journalists to integrate scientific evidence into their reporting. The Science Reporting Navigator, created in partnership with the Reynolds Journalism Institute, is a free interactive toolkit featuring scenario-based lessons and downloadable templates for journalists on any beat. Other resources include the Local Science Reporting Help Desk, a Slack-based community of practice, and a library of tip sheets and guides focused on local reporting challenges.

=== Collections ===
The Open Notebook publishes several topical collections of articles on science journalism. Among others these include a collection of resources on diversity, equity, and inclusion in science writing. The collection includes a resource page to assist journalists in finding diverse science sources and a collection of diversity style guides for journalists. It also offers the article series "Diverse Voices in Science Journalism," which is published in collaboration with the National Association of Science Writers (NASW) Diversity Committee. The series has included articles on subjects such as covering indigenous communities, dealing with harassment from sources, including LGBTQ+ scientists as sources, navigating newsrooms as a minority, decolonizing science writing in South Africa, and working with a sensitivity reader.

=== Pitch database ===
The Open Notebook's pitch database includes more than 300 successful pitch letters for news and feature stories to help writers gain better understanding of what makes a pitch most likely to succeed. Spencer Davis wrote, "Sections like the Pitch Database, which publishes successful pitches submitted by real journalists, can be extremely useful for figuring out what works and what doesn't." When The Open Notebook published its first book, The Craft of Science Writing, in 2020, some pitches from the pitch database were included in annotated form. In that piece, journalist Roxanne Khamsi pointed out well-executed elements of certain pitch letters, discussing what makes those elements important and that likely contributed to their success.eps science diorama contest.

=== Peeps science diorama contest ===
In 2019, The Open Notebook hosted an annual science-themed Peeps diorama contest. The project was the idea of Helen Fields, Kate Ramsayer and Joanna Fields, who had participated in past Peeps diorama contests hosted by The Washington Post and other publications. Winners included dioramas depicting, in Peeps, NASA's Hidden Figures, a virology laboratory, the National Museum of Natural History, and other scientific themes.

== Contributors ==
Contributors to The Open Notebook have included writers such as Nadia Drake, Ed Yong, Carl Zimmer, Laura Helmuth, Kendra Pierre-Louis, Sharon Begley, Tasneem Raja, Michelle Nijhuis, Anil Ananthaswamy, Melinda Wenner Moyer, Shraddha Chakradhar, Tom Yulsman, Olga Kreimer, Roxanne Khamsi, Brooke Borel, Mara Hvistendahl, George Musser, Azeen Ghorayshi, Sandeep Ravindran, and Charles Seife.

== Funding ==
The Open Notebook is supported by individual contributions and by grants from charitable foundations as well as by revenue from trainings and book sales. TON's early-career fellowship program is supported by the Burroughs Wellcome Fund. The Gordon and Betty Moore Foundation supported the initial articles in the Storygrams series from a grant to CASW as well as other TON programs. TON's Diverse Voices in Science Journalism series was supported by Science Sandbox, an initiative of the Simons Foundation. The Kavli Foundation supported development of a series of the Science Journalism Master Classes series of online courses. The Open Notebook has also received funding from the National Association of Science Writers, the Knight Foundation, the Alfred P. Sloan Foundation, Lyda Hill Philanthropies, and the Knight Science Journalism program at MIT, which said on its site, "It's a fantastic resource for science journalists, whether they're veterans or greenhorns".

== Selected publications ==
- Carpenter, Siri, ed. (2020). The Craft of Science Writing: Selections from The Open Notebook. Madison, Wisconsin: The Open Notebook, Inc. ISBN 9781734028003.
- Carpenter, Siri, ed. (2024). The Craft of Science Writing: Selections from The Open Notebook (2nd ed.). Chicago, Illinois: The University of Chicago Press. ISBN 978-0226830292.
- Carpenter, Siri, ed. (2026). The Best Science Stories and How They Work: A Collection with Commentary. Chicago, Illinois: The University of Chicago Press. ISBN 978-0-226-83034-6.

== See also ==
- Association of Health Care Journalists
- Council for the Advancement of Science Writing
- Environmental journalism
- Medical journalism
- Nature writing
- Non-profit journalism
- Popular science writing
- Public awareness of science
- Society of Environmental Journalists
- Society of Professional Journalists
