= The Best Science Stories and How They Work =

Non-fiction collection science stories

The Best Science Stories and How They Work: A Collection with Commentary
- Editor: Siri Carpenter
- Language: English
- Genre: Non-fiction anthology
- Publisher: University of Chicago Press
- Publication date: July 21, 2026
- Pages: 208
- ISBN: 978-0-226-830346

The Best Science Stories and How They Work: A Collection with Commentary is a collection of eleven annotated science articles and accompanying Q&A interviews. Edited by Siri Carpenter and published July 21, 2026, by the University of Chicago Press, the book is a project of the journalism nonprofit The Open Notebook and is part of the Chicago Guides to Writing, Editing, and Publishing series. It builds upon The Open Notebook's long-running Storygrams series, which was originally developed with support from the Council for the Advancement of Science Writing. The book was published with support from the Alfred P. Sloan Foundation.

== Description ==
The collection is intended to provide a "window into the craft of science writing" by making visible the reporting and writing choices behind science stories. Carpenter has credited her editor at the University of Chicago Press, Joe Calamia, who "suggested that we develop a book full of such annotated stories, alongside interviews with each of the stories' writers".

The annotated articles in the collection are drawn from Scientific American, Nature, The Atlantic, Quanta Magazine, The New York Times Magazine, MIT Technology Review, and other publications. Contributors include prominent science journalists such as Mary Roach, Amy Maxmen, Nadia Drake, Kendra Pierre-Louis, Bijal P. Trivedi, and Ed Yong, among others. The articles included in The Best Science Stories and How They Work collectively cover a range of scientific areas, including health and medicine, climate, conservation, neuroscience, space, mathematics, genetics, psychology, animal behavior, and the history of science. Each of the eleven chapters follows a consistent structure: the original science article, side-by-side annotations by a professional journalist, and a Q&A interview between the annotator and the original author. According to the book's introduction, the annotations are designed "to call attention to what makes each story impactful at multiple levels: the depth of reporting, the historical context, the structure; the scenes and characters and details that bring the story to life."

== Reviews ==
In an extended review in the CERN Courier, Clair Clavin wrote of The Best Science Stories and How They Work:

What makes the collection distinctive, however, is what happens around each article. Rather than asking readers simply to admire a successful piece of journalism, the annotations encourage them to notice its construction. Why does a story begin where it does? How is technical information introduced without interrupting the narrative? What makes a source compelling, and how should a journalist balance curiosity with scepticism? Such questions turn reading into a more active exercise. The conversations between writers and annotators add another layer by focusing attention on the decisions and challenges behind each piece.

Clavin concluded:

The Best Science Stories and How They Work makes a persuasive case for paying closer attention to how science stories are assembled, as well as to what they say. To early-career journalists, it offers an opportunity to examine the working methods behind effective reporting. To scientists, it provides a reminder that making science understandable involves more than simplifying terminology.

Andrew Robinson of Nature said the commentary between science writers and interviewers is "...an illuminating take on how to compose high-quality science journalism beyond the bubble."

Judith Davidoff has described this book as "a behind-the-scenes look at how high quality science reporting gets done".

Seth Mnookin wrote, "Siri Carpenter created a completely unique, constantly compelling site for science journalists with The Open Notebook. In The Best Science Stories and How They Work, she distills all of that into an absolutely brilliant book that will be cherished by the general public and will be on my syllabi for years to come."

According to Dan Fagin, "A great piece of longform writing is like a beautiful building: you never see the undergirding that keeps the whole thing from crashing down. This book renders the invisible visible, taking us deep inside eleven outstanding works of science journalism. Writers at all levels will profit immensely from the illumination."

Siri Carpenter and Ferris Jabr were interviewed by students of the Johns Hopkins writing program in October 2026, who reported:

The anthology features close readings and annotations done by fellow science journalists. Drawing on relationships she developed through The Open Notebook, Carpenter sought annotators who were both interested in the selected stories and could offer thoughtful insight into how the stories were written.

An author of a featured article The Open Notebook, Ferris Jabr said, "Scientists and journalists are kind of like the twin enemies of the state because we're the truth seekers and the fact seekers, and a lot of people in power right now don't want people like that out there."
