= Barbara Culliton =

American science journalist and editor

- Born: Barbara J. Culliton; Buffalo, New York, US
- Education: Vassar College
- Occupations: Editor and science journalist
- Employer(s): Science; Nature; Genome News Network

Barbara J. Culliton is an American science journalist, editor, and college professor. She was previously the news editor at Science, and deputy editor of Nature.

== Early life ==
Culliton was the daughter of Richard J. Culliton who was in the insurance business in Buffalo, New York. She attended the Buffalo Seminary. She then graduated from Vassar College.

== Career ==
Culliton was a reporter and news editor at Science for eighteen years. In 1991, she became the deputy editor of Nature. While there, she started Nature Genetics in 1992, Nature Structural Biology in 1994, and Nature Medicine in 1995. She was the editor-in-chief of Nature Medicine. She also served as the Washington Bureau Chief for Nature Publishing, Inc.

She taught science writing at Johns Hopkins University from 1990 to 1998 as the Times Mirror Visiting Professor. She previously held lectureships in journalist or science policy at the California Institute of Technology, Duke University, Stanford University, Vassar College, and Yale University.

In 1999, Culliton was the founding editor-in-chief of the online magazine Genome News Network. It was later taken over by the Center for the Advancement of Genomics. In 2005, she became the deputy editor of Health Affairs. In 2015, she was the editor of chief of the Journal of Investigative Medicine. In 2018, Culliton became a scholar in residence in the College of Communication and Information at Florida State University.

Culliton is a fellow of the Council for the Advancement of Science Writing (CASW) and a member of the National Academy of Medicine and the Institute of Medicine/National Academy of Sciences. She was the president of CASW and the National Association of Science Writers. She was also a member of the governing council of the Institute of Medicine. She served on the board of advisors of the Geisel School of Medicine at Dartmouth College and the Institute of Human Virology at the University of Maryland, Baltimore.

== Personal life ==
Culliton married Wallace K. Waterfall on November 22, 1974. Waterfall was a senior professional associate of the National Academy of Sciences.

She is a member of the Cosmos Club and serves on the Cosmos Club Foundation board. She became an honorary member of Sigma Xi, a scientific research honor society, in 1996. Hahnemann University Medical School gave her an honorary doctor of science degree in 1991.

== Selected publications ==
- ."Sickle Cell Anemia: The Route from Obscurity to Prominence". Science, vol. 178 (October 13, 1972), p. 138–142.
- "The Sloan-Kettering Affair: A Story without a Hero". Science, vol.184, no. 4137 (May 10, 1974), pp. 644–650, DOI: 10.1126/science.184.4137.644
- "Mrs. Lasker's War". Harper's Magazine, vol. 252 (June 1976), p. 60.
- "Recombinant DNA Bills Derailed: Congress Still Trying to Pass a Law". Science, vol. 199 (January 20, 1978), pp. 274–77.
- "The Mystery of the Shroud of Turin Challenges 20th-Century Science". Science, vol. 201, no. 4351 (July 21, 1978), pp. 235–239. DOI: 10.1126/science.201.4352.235
- “Science’s Restive Public.” Daedalus 107, no. 2 (Spring 1978): 147–56.
- "Harvard Researchers Retract Data in Immunology Paper". Science, vol. 234, no. 4789 (November 28, 1986), p. 1069. DOI: 10.1126/science.3535072
- "A Bitter Battle Over Error I". Science, vol. 240 (June 24, 1988), pp . 1720-1723.
- "Can Reason Defeat Unreason?". Nature, vol 351 (13 June 13, 1991), p. 517.
- "Heart Disease: Progress And Promise of "Personalized Medicine". Health Affairs, January 29, 2007.
- "Cancer: Bridging The Gap Between Basic Research And Health Policy". Health Affairs, December 4, 2007.
- "Should FDA Regulate Nanomedicine Differently?" Health Affairs, June 20, 2008.
