= Andrew Gregory (journalist) =

British journalist, writer, producer, director, and photographer

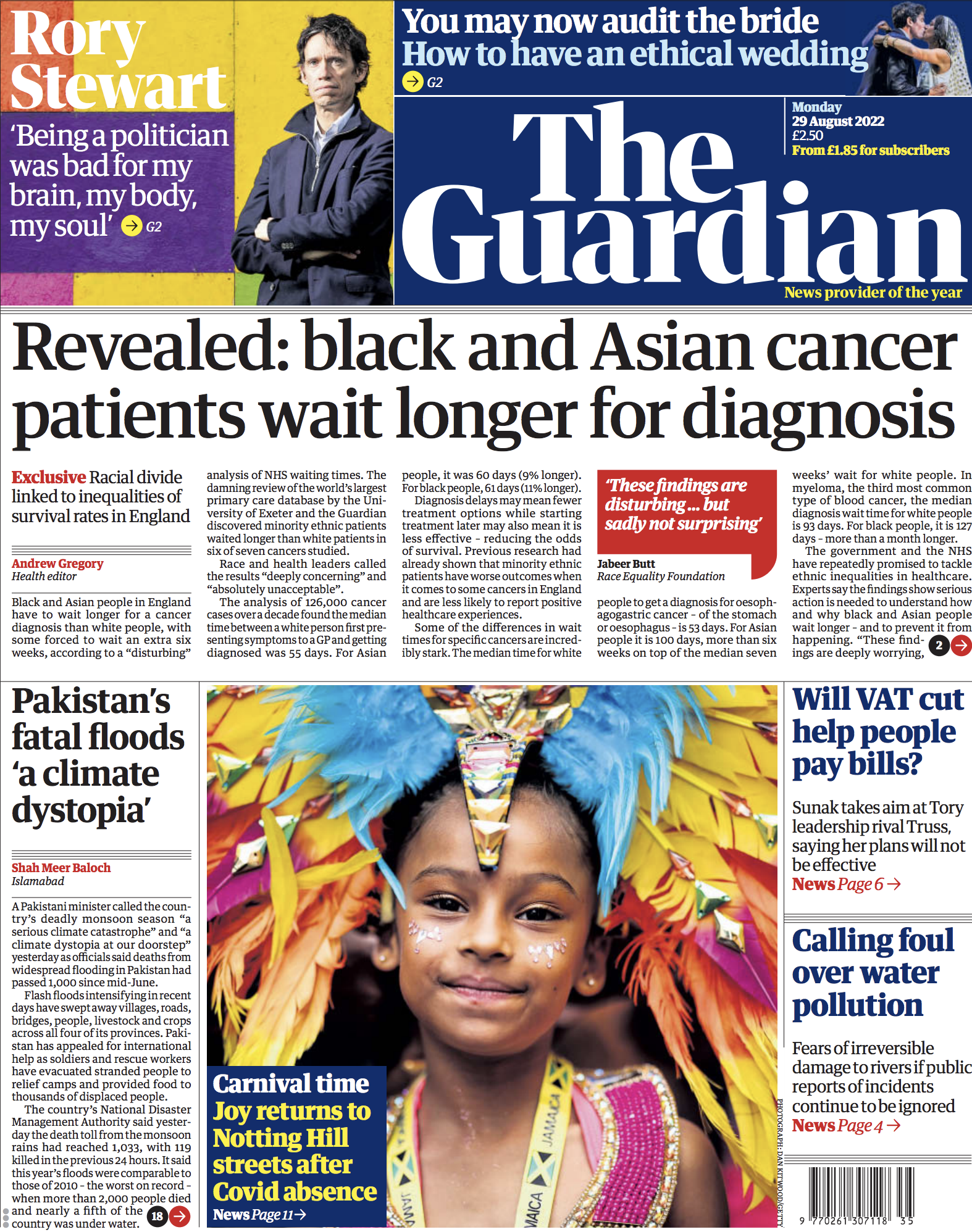
- Gregory's work in The Guardian
- Education: University of Warwick (BA); University of the Arts London (MA)
- Occupations: Journalist; writer; producer; director; photographer
- Years active: 2006–present
- Employer: The Guardian
- Website: andrewgregory.com

Andrew Gregory is a British journalist, writer, producer, director, and photographer, and the health editor of The Guardian.

He is the recipient of numerous accolades, including the Royal Statistical Society prize for investigative journalism, three Press Awards, a Press Gazette Award, a Medical Journalists' Association Award, and a Guild of Health Writers Award.

In 2025, Gregory executive produced Of All the Things, an animated short film about hoarding disorder. It was selected to screen at the 15th edition of the BAFTA-qualifying Aesthetica Film Festival and nominated for an RTS Award.

== Career ==
=== Journalism ===
Gregory was appointed the health editor of The Guardian in 2021. Previously, he was the health editor of The Sunday Times.

In 2023, Gregory won the Royal Statistical Society prize for investigative journalism and the Medical Journalists' Association's news award for exposing how black and Asian people in England had to wait longer than white people for a cancer diagnosis.

He has twice been named Health Journalist of the Year by the Society of Editors.

=== Film ===
In 2025, Gregory executive produced Of All the Things, an animated short film about hoarding disorder. Next, he will produce an animated short film about alcohol addiction, Small Hours, starring Robert Bathurst.

Previously, Gregory served as an associate producer on Alitisal (2024), a live action short film about immigrant mental health. The film premiered at the 18th edition of the Oscar-qualifying Beirut Shorts International Film Festival and won multiple awards.

His other credits include Tredegar (2023), 33 Hours (2022), Long Covid (2021), Freya (2021), Deafblind Doctor (2019), HIV Transplants (2016), and Teddy's Story (2015).

== Affiliations ==
- American Film Institute
- Association of British Science Writers
- Association of Health Care Journalists
- British Film Institute
- Documentary Association of Europe
- Documentary Film Council
- Documentary Producers Alliance
- Guild of Health Writers
- International Documentary Association
- Investigative Reporters and Editors
- London Press Club
- Medical Journalists' Association
- Royal Photographic Society
- Royal Society of Medicine
- Royal Television Society

== Filmography ==
Year	Title	Role	Ref.
2015	Teddy's Story	Writer · producer · director	
2015	Teddy's Story: The Grandmother	Writer · producer · director	
2015	Roy	Writer · producer	
2016	HIV Transplants	Writer · producer	
2016	HIV Transplants: The Surgeons	Writer · producer	
2019	Deafblind Doctor	Writer · producer	
2021	Freya	Writer · producer	
2021	Long Covid	Writer · producer	
2022	33 Hours	Writer · producer	
2023	Tredegar	Writer · producer	
2024	Parallel Lives	Co-producer	
2024	Alitisal	Associate producer	
2025	Wargamers	Associate producer	
2025	The Nomophobe	Associate producer	
2025	Nowhere Man	Executive producer	
2025	Of All the Things	Executive producer	
2026	Small Hours	Producer	

== Awards and nominations ==
Association	Year	Category	Result	Ref.
Asian Media Awards	2023	Best Investigation	Nominated	
British Media Awards	2016	Editorial Campaign of the Year	Nominated	
Cudlipp Award	2015	Cudlipp Award	Nominated	
Cudlipp Award	2016	Cudlipp Award	Nominated	
Cudlipp Award	2019	Cudlipp Award	Nominated	
Guild of Health Writers Awards	2016	Best National Newspaper Writing	Won	
London Press Club Awards	2011	Scoop of the Year	Nominated	
Medical Journalists' Association Awards	2013	Consumer Staff Journalist	Nominated	
Medical Journalists' Association Awards	2015	Staff Journalist	Nominated	
Medical Journalists' Association Awards	2016	News Story of the Year	Nominated	
Medical Journalists' Association Awards	2016	Science Explained	Nominated	
Medical Journalists' Association Awards	2017	Case Study of the Year	Nominated	
Medical Journalists' Association Awards	2017	News Story of the Year	Nominated	
Medical Journalists' Association Awards	2018	News Story of the Year	Nominated	
Medical Journalists' Association Awards	2019	News Story of the Year	Nominated	
Medical Journalists' Association Awards	2022	Case Study of the Year	Nominated	
Medical Journalists' Association Awards	2022	News Story of the Year	Nominated	
Medical Journalists' Association Awards	2022	Science Explained	Nominated	
Medical Journalists' Association Awards	2023	Feature of the Year	Nominated	
Medical Journalists' Association Awards	2023	News Story of the Year	Won	
Medical Journalists' Association Awards	2024	Gordon McVie Award for Reporting Cancer Research	Nominated	
Medical Journalists' Association Awards	2024	Podcast of the Year	Nominated	
Medical Journalists' Association Awards	2025	Feature of the Year	Nominated	
Medical Journalists' Association Awards	2025	Mental Health Story of the Year	Nominated	
Medical Journalists' Association Awards	2025	Podcast of the Year	Nominated	
Medical Journalists' Association Awards	2025	Science Explained	Nominated	
Online Media Awards	2016	Online Editorial Campaign of the Year	Won	
Press Awards	2010	Young Journalist of the Year	Nominated	
Press Awards	2011	Scoop of the Year	Nominated	
Press Awards	2015	Science and Health Journalist of the Year	Won	
Press Awards	2017	Science and Health Journalist of the Year	Nominated	
Press Awards	2018	Health Journalist of the Year	Won	
Press Awards	2018	Front Page of the Year	Nominated	
Press Awards	2019	Chairman's Award	Won	
Press Awards	2021	Health Journalist of the Year	Nominated	
Press Awards	2023	Health Journalist of the Year	Nominated	
Press Gazette British Journalism Awards	2012	Breaking News	Won	
Press Gazette British Journalism Awards	2013	Science and Technology Journalist of the Year	Nominated	
Press Gazette British Journalism Awards	2015	Popular Journalism	Nominated	
Press Gazette British Journalism Awards	2017	Campaign of the Year	Nominated	
Press Gazette British Journalism Awards	2019	Health and Life Sciences Journalism	Nominated	
Press Gazette British Journalism Awards	2020	Science Journalism	Nominated	
Press Gazette British Journalism Awards	2022	Health and Life Sciences Journalism	Nominated	
Press Gazette Student Journalism Awards	2007	News Writer of the Year	Nominated	
Press Gazette Student Journalism Awards	2007	Online Journalist of the Year	Nominated	
Press Gazette Student Journalism Awards	2007	Scoop of the Year	Nominated	
Pride of Trinity Mirror Awards	2014	Scoop of the Year	Nominated	
Royal Statistical Society Statistical Excellence in Journalism Awards	2023	Investigative Journalism	Won	
Trinity Mirror Excellence Awards	2016	Campaign of the Year	Won	
Trinity Mirror Excellence Awards	2016	Digital Excellence	Nominated	
Trinity Mirror Excellence Awards	2016	Front Page of the Year	Nominated	
Trinity Mirror Excellence Awards	2016	Scoop of the Year	Nominated	
Trinity Mirror Excellence Awards	2016	Video of the Year	Won	
Young Epilepsy Champions Awards	2015	Speaking Out	Won	

Media offices
New title	Health Editor of The Sunday Times; 2018–2021	Succeeded by Shaun Lintern
Preceded by Sarah Boseley	Health Editor of The Guardian; 2021–present	Incumbent
