= Jo Handelsman =

American microbiologist

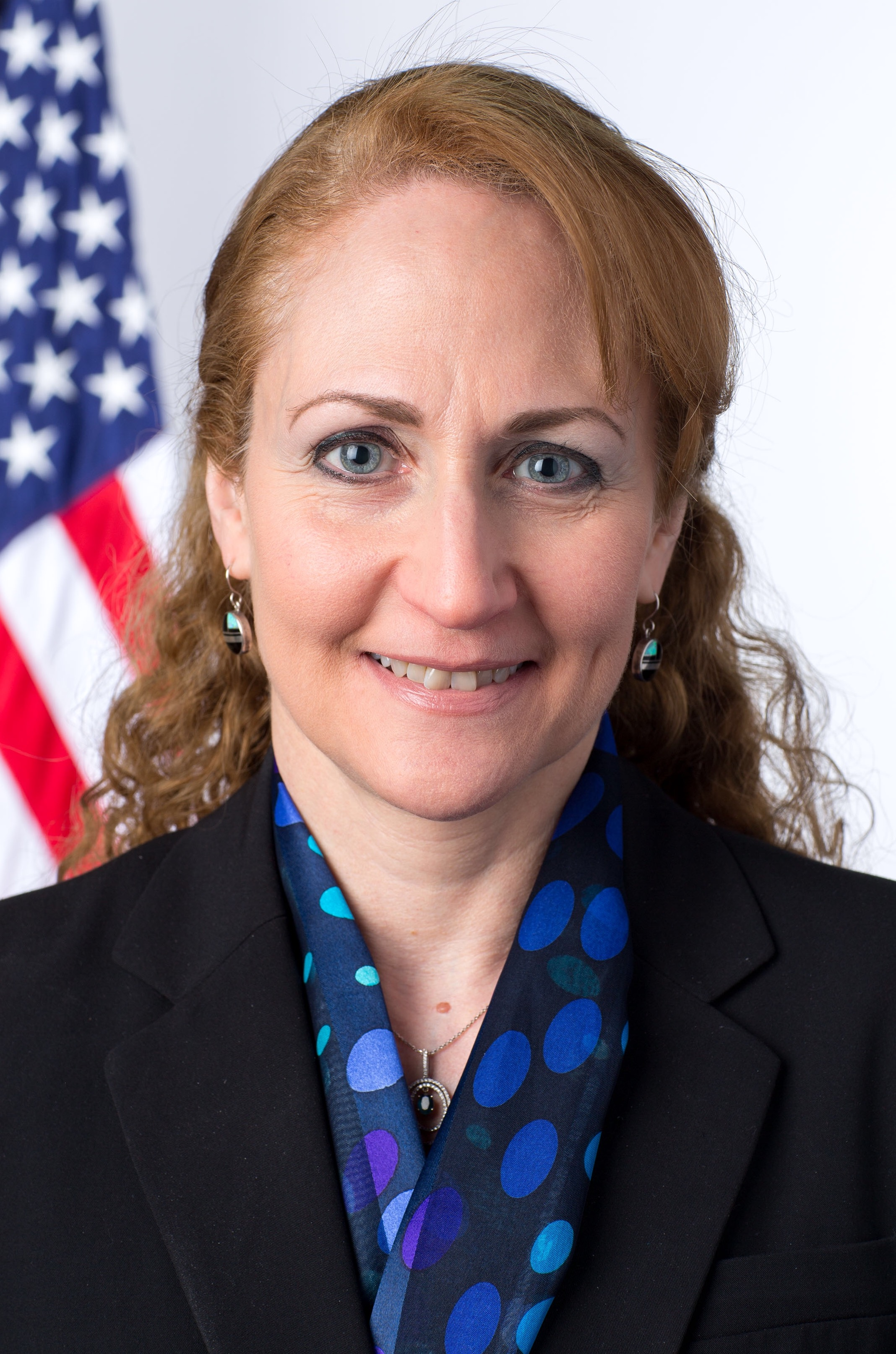
- Born: Jo Emily Handelsman; March 19, 1959 (age 67); New York City, U.S.
- Education: Cornell University (BS); University of Wisconsin, Madison (MS, PhD)
- Scientific career
- Workplaces: Yale University; University of Wisconsin, Madison; Cornell University
- Website: Hughes Institute website

Jo Emily Handelsman (born March 19, 1959) is the Director of the Wisconsin Institute for Discovery at University of Wisconsin–Madison. She is also a Vilas Research Professor and a Howard Hughes Medical Institute Professor. Handelsman was appointed by President Barack Obama as the Associate Director for Science at the White House Office of Science and Technology Policy, where she served for three years until January 2017. She has been editor-in-chief of the academic journal DNA and Cell Biology and author of books on scientific education, most notably Scientific Teaching.

== Education ==
Handelsman was born on March 19, 1959, in New York City. She earned her Bachelor of Science degree in agronomy from Cornell University in 1979 and her Ph.D. in molecular biology from the University of Wisconsin–Madison in 1984.

== Career ==
Handelsman secured a faculty position in plant pathology at the University of Wisconsin–Madison in 1985. She remained at Wisconsin until 2009, and then took a position at the Yale University Department of Molecular, Cellular and Developmental Biology in 2010. Her research involves the study of microorganisms present in soil and insect gut. She is responsible for coining the term metagenomics and is particularly known for her work in pioneering the use of functional metagenomics to study antibiotic resistance. She has published books and held workshops on scientific teaching, for which she is recognized nationally.

She is a researcher and advocate of women in science issues. One of Handelsman's seminal studies found that the gender of a name on a science resume affected a professor's inclination to hire, mentor, and pay applicants for a lab position. She was co-director of the Women in Science and Engineering Leadership Institute and was the first president of the Rosalind Franklin Society. She is also the co-author of six books on the topic of teaching and education.

== Honors and awards ==
In 2008, Handelsman received the Alice C. Evans Award from the American Society for Microbiology, and in 2011 was awarded the Presidential Award for Excellence in Science, Mathematics and Engineering Mentoring from the National Science Foundation. In 2015, she gave the third annual Patrusky Lecture from the Council for the Advancement of Science Writing. She was elected to the American Academy of Arts and Sciences as a Fellow in 2019. In 2020, she was awarded the Viktor Hamburger Outstanding Educator Prize from the Society for Developmental Biology. In 2023, she was elected to the National Academy of Sciences.

== Bibliography ==
- Scientific Teaching (2006) (ISBN 978-1429201889)
- Entering Mentoring:A Seminar to Train a New Generation of Scientists (2008) (ISBN 978-0981516110)
- A World Without Soil: The Past, Present, and Precarious Future of the Earth Beneath Our Feet (2021) (ISBN 978-0300271119)
