= Andrew Gregory =

Andrew Gregory may refer to:

- Andrew Gregory (journalist), British journalist, writer, producer, director, and photographer, and the health editor of The Guardian
- Andrew Gregory (British Army officer) (born 1957), retired British Army officer
- Andrew Gregory (footballer) (born 1976), English former professional footballer

== See also ==
- Andrew Gregor, American soccer player
- André Gregory, French-born American theatre director, writer and actor
