= Siri Carpenter =

American freelance science journalist (born 1971)

Siri Jane Carpenter
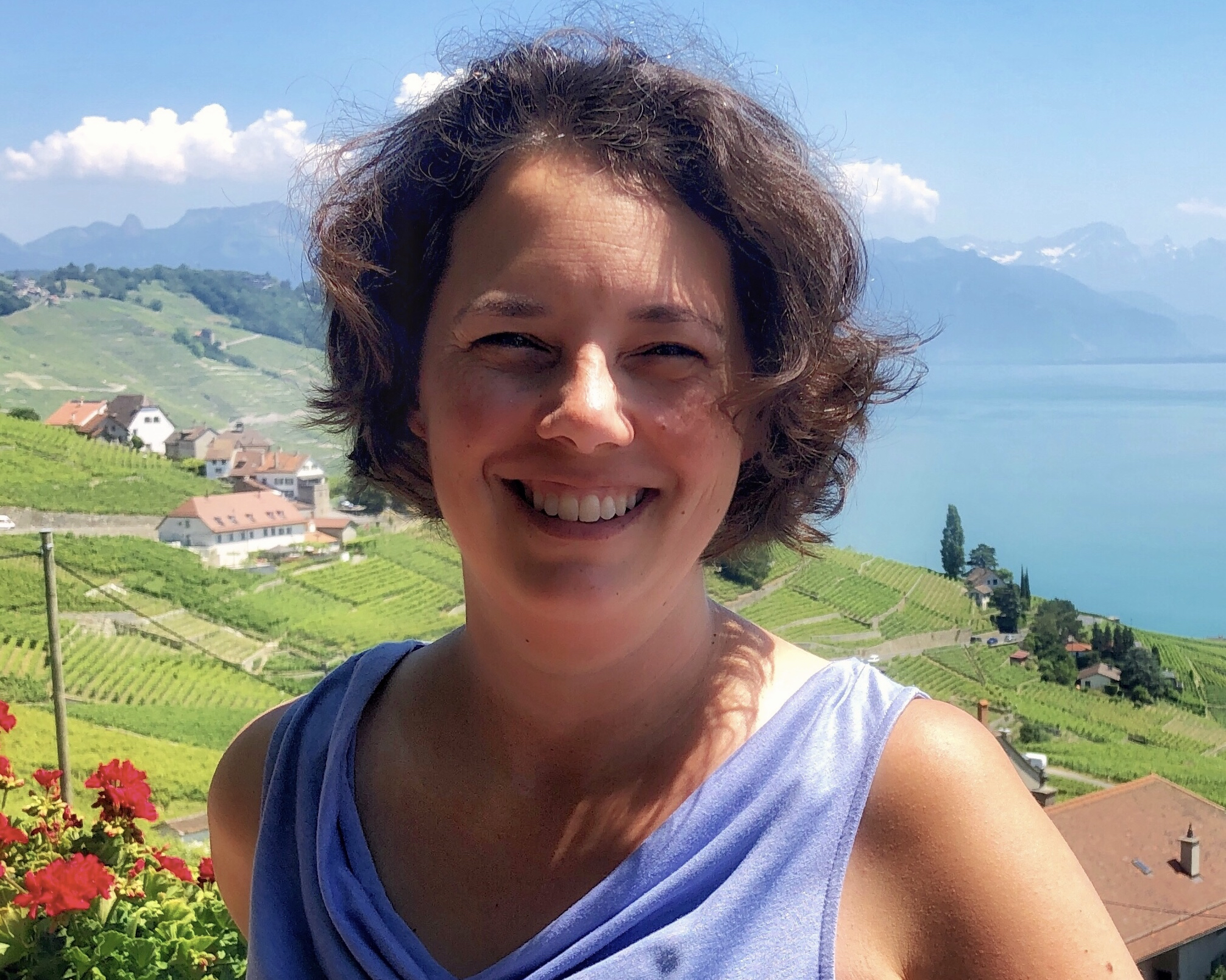
- Portrait of Carpenter, 2019 taken in Switzerland by Christie Aschwanden
- Born: 1971 (age 54–55)
- Education: University of Wisconsin–Madison (BA); Yale University (MS, PhD)
- Occupation: Freelance science journalist
- Writing career
- Genre: Journalism
- Website: siricarpenter.com

Siri Carpenter (born 1971) is an American freelance science journalist and editor living in Madison, Wisconsin. The author of multiple articles in Scientific American, Science, APA Monitor, and other publications, she is a co-founder and the executive director and editor-in-chief of The Open Notebook. In 2018 Carpenter was elected to a two-year term as president of the National Association of Science Writers.

== Early life and education ==
Carpenter grew up in La Crescent, Minnesota. She is married, with two daughters, and lives in Madison, Wisconsin. She completed her undergraduate education at the University of Wisconsin–Madison, earning a B.A. in psychology in 1995. She earned an M.S. in 1997, and Ph.D. in 2000, both in social psychology at Yale University. Her dissertation, Implicit gender attitudes, was directed by Mahzarin R. Banaji.

== Career ==
=== Early career ===
In 1998 Carpenter was a Science and Engineering Mass Media Fellow of the American Association for the Advancement of Science, at the Richmond Times-Dispatch in Richmond, Virginia. The following year she was a science writer intern at Science News in Washington, D.C. After completing her Ph.D., Carpenter was hired as a senior science writer for the APA Monitor on Psychology in Washington, D.C., from 2000 to 2002.

=== Science journalist, editor ===
Carpenter's career as a freelance science journalist began in 2002. She has written for media outlets including The New York Times, Science Magazine, Scientific American, Science News, and others. From 2012 to 2014, she was a senior editor and then a features editor at Discover Magazine in Waukesha, Wisconsin. Carpenter has also worked as a freelance editor for several publications, including bioGraphic, and Science News for Students. In 2025, she joined the National Academies of Sciences, Engineering, and Medicine Standing Committee on Advancing Science Communication.

== The Open Notebook ==
When it comes to freelance writing, some things are curiously taboo. Many of the most important aspects of freelancing, like pay rates and contract negotiation, are often shrouded in secrecy. Luckily there’s The Open Notebook, which was founded to shed light on these important topics.

— Spencer Davis, The Freelancer

In 2010 Carpenter co-founded The Open Notebook (TON), a science journalism non-profit organization, magazine and publisher, with Jeanne Erdmann, a health science journalist. Carpenter is executive director and editor-in-chief, and serves on the board of directors; Erdmann is an emeritus board member. Gary Price of Library Journal said The Open Notebook "provides unique tools and resources to help science journalists at all experience levels hone their craft".

== National Association of Science Writers ==
Carpenter was vice president of the National Association of Science Writers (NASW), 2016–2018, and was elected to a two-year term as president in 2018. NASW is "...a community of journalists, authors, editors, producers, public information officers, students and people who write and produce material intended to inform the public about science, health, engineering, and technology".

== Publications ==
=== Books ===
In 2007, Carpenter and Karen Huffman wrote the textbook, Visualizing Psychology. A second edition was published 2010, and Wiley published the third edition in 2012.

In 2020, TON published The Craft of Science Writing: Selections from The Open Notebook, edited by Carpenter. Jonathan Wai wrote in Psychology Today, "...a new book edited by distinguished science writer Siri Carpenter seeks to illuminate The Craft of Science Writing by collecting numerous perspectives from science writers themselves about how to improve their own craft of science writing."

In 2024, a second, expanded edition of The Craft of Science Writing: Selections from The Open Notebook was published by the University of Chicago Press.

In 2026, the University of Chicago Press published The Best Science Stories and How They Work, a collection of 11 annotated science articles and accompanying author interviews; the volume was edited by Carpenter.

=== Selected articles ===
- Carpenter, Siri (April 2008). "Buried Prejudice: The Bigot in Your Brain". Scientific American Mind. doi:10.1038/scientificamericanmind0408-32. Archived from the original on March 13, 2014.
- Carpenter, Siri (February 6, 2009). "Darwin's Legacy: Rich Collections, Deep Expertise". Science. 351 (6271): 346, 418.
- Carpenter, Siri (March 30, 2009). "Treating an Illness Is One Thing. What About a Patient With Many?". The New York Times. ISSN 0362-4331. Archived from the original on February 8, 2019.
- Carpenter, Siri (November 3, 2011). "Is Your Parent Over-Medicated?". Prevention. Archived from the original on September 3, 2020.
- Carpenter, Siri (March 30, 2012). "Psychology's Bold Initiative". Science. 335 (6076): 1558–1561. Bibcode:2012Sci...335.1558C. doi:10.1126/science.335.6076.1558. ISSN 0036-8075. PMID 22461583. Archived from the original on October 17, 2019.
- Carpenter, Siri (September 14, 2012). "Scientific Misconduct. Government Sanctions Harvard Psychologist". Science. 337 (6100): 1283. doi:10.1126/science.337.6100.1283. PMID 22984041. Archived from the original on March 26, 2018.
- Carpenter, Siri (September 14, 2012). "That Gut Feeling". APA Monitor. 43 (8): 50.
- Carpenter, Siri (October 21, 2014). "Seth Mnookin Follows a Family Battling a Rare Genetic Disease". The Open Notebook.
- Carpenter, Siri (February 10, 2015). "Adults with Autism Are Left to Navigate a Jarring World". Science News. doi:10.1002/scin.2015.187004017. Archived from the original on February 11, 2015.
- Carpenter, Siri (June 17, 2015). "How Scott Walker Dismantled Wisconsin's Environmental Legacy". Scientific American. Archived from the original on June 18, 2015.
- Carpenter, Siri (September 7, 2015). "Why Do Some Children Seem to 'Outgrow' Autism?". Spectrum News. Archived from the original on October 6, 2015.
- Carpenter, Siri (May 30, 2016). "Biologist Kate Rubins' Big Dream Takes Her to the Space Station". Science News.
- Carpenter, Siri (March 13, 2018). "How to Do a Close Read". The Open Notebook. Archived from the original on March 15, 2018.
- Carpenter, Siri (January 29, 2019). "Christie Aschwanden Tackles the Science of Exercise Recovery". The Open Notebook. Archived from the original on May 13, 2020.
- Carpenter, Siri (May 7, 2020). "Editors' Roundtable: Managing Pandemic Coverage". The Open Notebook. Archived from the original on May 11, 2020.

== Awards and honors ==
- 2009 Outstanding Article Award for Reporting on a Significant Topic, American Society of Journalists and Authors, for "Buried Prejudice", Scientific American Mind, April/May 2008.
- 2009 National Magazine Award Finalist, Prevention (December 2009) "Is Your Parent Over-Medicated?"
- 2023 Online News Association, Community Award

== See also ==
- Environmental journalism
- Medical journalism
- Nature writing
- Non-profit journalism
- Open science
