= Richard Kerr =

Richard Kerr may refer to:

- Richard Kerr (songwriter) (1944–2023), English composer
- Richard James Kerr (born 1935), deputy director of the C.I.A., 1989–1992
- Dickey Kerr (Richard Henry Kerr, 1893–1963), American baseball pitcher
- Richard Kerr (artist) (born 1952), Canadian filmmaker
- Richard A. Kerr, science journalist
