= The Craft of Science Writing =

Non-fiction book about skills of science writers

- Second, expanded edition
- Editor: Siri Carpenter
- Genre: Non-fiction anthology
- Published: 2020 The Open Notebook; 2024 University of Chicago Press
- Publication date: November 5, 2024 (2nd ed)
- ISBN: 978-0226830292

The Craft of Science Writing is a non-fiction book edited by Siri Carpenter and published originally in 2020 by The Open Notebook. The second, expanded edition was published in 2024 by the University of Chicago Press. The book is part of the Chicago Guides to Writing, Editing, and Publishing series.

== Synopsis ==
The first edition of The Craft of Science Writing presented more than thirty articles, organized to answer five questions: "Who is a science journalist and how do you become one? What makes a science story and how do you find one? How do you report a science story? How do you tell your story? How do you build expertise in science writing?"

The Craft of Science Writing, expanded edition, published in 2024, presents nine more articles than the original edition, with some new articles and others previously published on The Open Notebook website. According to the publisher's website, the articles focus "...on such topics as how to establish a science beat, how to find and use quotes, how to critically evaluate scientific claims, how to use social media for reporting, and how to do data-driven reporting."

== Critical reception ==
In ALA's CHOICE, Melody Herr wrote that the articles are organized "into an introductory course that covers becoming a science journalist, identifying a story idea, conducting research, writing the story, and building proficiency in core skills". She also said the articles demonstrate effective idea presentation, "through personal anecdotes, interviews with award-winning journalists, expert panel discussions, and visuals, including a marked-up science article, a flowchart, and helpful checklists". Herr wrote that the articles "address artistic, practical, and business aspects of the craft", as well as "the emotional strain of reporting and the journalist’s social responsibility to confront flawed science and incorporate diverse voices... Summing Up: Highly recommended. All readers".

Estelle Erasmus wrote of the expanded version that Siri Carpenter "breaks down science writing so it is accessible for everyone".

Bonnie Denmark, on the faculty of Western Connecticut State University and a member of the IEEE Professional Communication Society, wrote:

"The Craft of Science Writing is an excellent craft book written by a diverse community of writers for a diverse community of readers... The new articles round out the collection with guidance on working with sensitivity readers, eradicating ableist language, critically evaluating claims, tapping into social media for sources, and basing writing on data, among other subjects."

The Brooklyn Public Library's review noted:

"...science writers have to spin tales seductive enough to keep readers hooked to the end, despite the endless other delights just a click away. How does one do it? Here, in a second edition, is a collection of indispensable articles on the craft of science writing as told by some of the most skillful science journalists working today."

Jonathan Wai wrote in Psychology Today, that it "...seeks to illuminate the craft of science writing by collecting numerous perspectives from science writers themselves about how to improve their own craft of science writing." Wai wrote, "The conversation among scientists themselves has not yet included learning from science writers and editors themselves, and thus this new volume, in my view, is important to read for scientists to understand what it is that science writers do, what it means to tell a great story about science, and the incentive structure that science writers are under especially as journalism is rapidly shifting."

Carolyn Crist wrote the pieces, "...offer advice about how to pitch stories, evaluate scientific and statistical claims, report on controversial topics, and engage readers with a scientific story."

The editors of Brontide Journal said,"It is the go to source for anyone who wants to write about science. Whether that's the science behind the story or if the science, is the story itself."

Jacqui Banaszynski said that the anthology and The Open Notebook, "while embedded in a science-based world, offer valuable wisdom for any writer who covers a challenging specialty subject. Or, frankly, for any writer who has the aspiration to do high-level, in-depth work."

== See also ==
- Environmental journalism
- Medical journalism
- Nature writing
- Non-profit journalism
- Popular science writing
- Science journalism
