= Bijal =

Bijal is both a feminine given name and a surname. Notable people with the name include:

- Bijal P. Trivedi (fl. 1998), American journalist
- Chhanga Trikam Bijal (fl. 2022), Indian politician
