= Helen Branswell =

Canadian science journalist (1957–2026)

- Branswell in 2024
- Born: May 19, 1957; Sherbrooke, Quebec, Canada
- Died: October 13, 2026 (aged 69); Ottawa, Ontario, Canada
- Education: St. Thomas University
- Occupation: Journalist
- Years active: 1986–2026
- Known for: Health journalism

Mary Helen Branswell (May 19, 1957 – October 13, 2026) was a Canadian infectious diseases and global health reporter at Stat News. Branswell spent 15 years as a medical reporter at The Canadian Press, where she led coverage of the Ebola, Zika, SARS and swine flu pandemics. She joined Stat News at its founding in 2015, leading the website's coverage of the COVID-19 pandemic.

== Early life and education ==
Branswell was born on May 19, 1957, in Sherbrooke, Quebec, Canada, to John and Margaret (née Steele) Branswell. In 1978, Branswell received a B.A. in English literature from the St. Thomas University in New Brunswick, Canada. When asked how she wound up in journalism she replied:

I fell into journalism, I was not somebody who had worked at a high school newspaper or college newspaper or anything. I just didn't know what to do after getting a Bachelor of Arts degree in English Literature. And somebody said, "What can you do?" And I said, "I think I can write." And so, I started freelancing for the local paper in the small town I lived in at the time in Eastern Canada at $15 a story. And the rest is history, but with a lot of moves and a lot of different opportunities along the way.

== Career ==
Branswell joined The Canadian Press in 1986, where she served as London correspondent for five years. She started out in general news, working as a political reporter and foreign correspondent. She switched to medical reporting in 2000, and became well known for her coverage of global health outbreaks, starting with the first 2002–2004 SARS outbreak where she reported "on the only real outbreak outside of Asia." Branswell led the coverage of the Severe Acute Respiratory Syndrome (SARS), Ebola, Avian influenza, Zika, Middle East respiratory syndrome and swine flu pandemics. In 2004 Branswell was a Knight Fellow at the Centers for Disease Control.

In 2011, Branswell was a Nieman Fellow at Harvard University. Here she concentrated on polio eradication, with a focus on how India is fighting the spread of poliovirus. During an interview with the Nieman Foundation for Journalism, Branswell provided an overview of her experience on reporting during pandemics. This report included advice on which stories to cover and not cover, how to identify reliable sources and how to prepare for interviews with researchers. The Canadian Press did not have a large budget and Branswell wrote most of her articles from her office or home.

In 2015, Branswell left The Canadian Press to join Stat News, a health news website which had launched that year. Branswell was a popular science communicator; she was often recommended as an important health journalist to follow on Twitter during the COVID-19 pandemic. She was selected as a Harvard Medical School media fellow in 2019.

=== Coverage of the COVID-19 pandemic ===
Branswell led the Stat News reporting on the coronavirus pandemic. She first started sharing concerns about the emerging outbreak on December 31, 2019. Branswell had read a ProMED-mail posting that described an unexplained pneumonia in Wuhan, which concerned her because of its similarities to SARS. Two days later, in early January 2020, Branswell tweeted, "Not liking the look of this". By January 4 Branswell had written her first article on SARS-CoV-2 for Stat News, predicting that it could be "a new coronavirus".

She used her Twitter feed to discuss recent developments as well as debunking misinformation. She remarked that, for the scientific community, this virus was different to other pandemics, because the rise of preprint servers meant that journalists and the public had access to data and research much faster than before. She covered the development of a COVID-19 vaccine, interviewing the Head of Vaccine research at Sanofi, who estimated that it would take three years before the vaccine was widely available. She questioned why Robert R. Redfield, director of the Centers for Disease Control, was so silent throughout the outbreak, whereas they provided regular briefings during the 2009 swine flu pandemic.

== Death ==
Branswell died from complications of breast cancer in Ottawa on October 13, 2026, at the age of 69.

== Fellowships and awards ==
- 1992: University of Toronto, Southam journalism fellow
- 2004: Centers for Disease Control and Prevention, Knight Fellow
- 2011: Harvard University, Nieman Fellow: Nieman Global Health Fellowship
- 2020: George Polk Journalism Award for Public Service. In the announcement of the award, the reporting for which she won the award was described as follows: "Branswell tracked the spread of the virus in 161 articles—more than three a week—[articles] that were almost uniformly timely and astute."
- 2021: Council for the Advancement of Science Writing, Victor Cohn Prize for Excellence in Medical Science Reporting, shared with Amy Maxmen
- 2023: Carleton University, Doctor of Laws, honoris causa
