= How to be Disabled in a Pandemic =

2025 edited volume

- Cover of the 2025 NYU Press edition
- Editors: Mara Mills, Harris Kornstein, Faye Ginsburg, and Rayna Rapp
- Language: English
- Subjects: Sociology; Disability Studies
- Publisher: New York University Press
- Publication date: 2025
- Media type: Print (hardcover, Paperback)
- Pages: 392
- Awards: Foundation for the Sociology of Health & Illness' Book of the Year Prize (2026)
- ISBN: 9781479830831

How to be Disabled in a Pandemic is a 2025 book edited by Mara Mills, Harris Kornstein, Faye Ginsburg, and Rayna Rapp, published by New York University Press. The book addresses the experiences of disabled people living in New York City during the COVID-19 pandemic. Contributors to the book included Judith Heumann and Ed Yong. The book won the Foundation for the Sociology of Health & Illness Book of the Year Prize in 2026. The book is open access and available to read for free online.

== Contents ==
The book's contents is as follows:

- "Foreward: Into the Pandemic's Disability Hinterlands" by Ed Yong
- "Introduction: How to Be Disabled in a Pandemic" by Mara Mills, Harris Kornstein, Faye Ginsburg, and Rayna Rapp
- Part I. Living with "Disproportionate Risk": Policies, Institutions, and Congregate Settings

- ""We Were Sick, And They Punished Us Even More": Living through COVID-19 in New York State Prisons" by Tommaso Bardelli, Aiyuba Thomas, and Dylan Brown
- "Second-Class Noncitizens: The Impact of the COVID-19 Pandemic on Immigrants with Disabilities in New York City" by J.C. Salyer
- "Housing as Health Care: Shelter and Safety across Decades" by Salonee Bhaman
- "From Inaccessibility to Pathologized Mobility on New York City’s Public Transit: Finding Affordances in a Pandemic" by Yan Grenier
- "Vent: Making and Debating the New York State Ventilator Allocation Guidelines" by Mara Mills
- "High Stakes Schooling: Risk, Protection, and the Education of Disabled Children in a Pandemic" by Alexandra Freidus, Rachel Fish, and Erica O. Turner
- " Care Work, Creativity, and Unplanned Survival in the Time of COVID" by Faye Ginsburg and Rayna Rapp

- Part II. Disability Communities: Expertise, Activism, and Solidarity

- "When Postviral Goes Viral: Myalgic Encephalomyelitis, Long COVID, and Pandemic Déjà Vu" by Harris Kornstein and Emily Lim Rogers
- "The Everyday Lives of Qilao during the Pandemic" by Shuting Li
- "“We Want Cop- Free Communities”: Reflections on Anti- Asian Violences and Safety" by Mon Mohapatra, Heena Sharma, Yves Tong Nguyen, and Rachel Ku
- "Mental Health and Black Futurity: Life, Birth, and Caregiving in Double Pandemics" by Nadia Mbonde
- "Disability Justice, Material Needs, and Mutual Aid: Lessons from Autistic Communities during the Pandemic" by Cara Ryan
- "Making Art in Bed" by Emily Watlington
- "Reflections on Being a Disability Reporter during the Pandemic" by Amanda Morris

- "Coda: Toward a Disability Future" by Judith Heumann

== Reception ==
Megan Moodie, writing for Medical Anthropology Quarterly, described the book as a "watershed" for medical anthropology for dealing "with medical questions, structures, and personnel in the same frame as disability without medicalizing disability itself". Moira Armstrong, in a review for Disability & Society, praised the book for "its diverse approaches, attention to intersectionality, and focus on disability" calling it "a welcome addition to the literature". Armstrong said that the book "offers a vibrant, important vision for re-embracing these changes, led by the disabled people who pioneered them".

=== Awards ===
- Foundation for the Sociology of Health & Illness Book of the Year Prize (2026).
