= GNN =

GNN can stand for:

- GNNradio, a Christian radio network in the southeastern United States
- GNN (news channel), Pakistani news channel
- Garde Nationale et Nomade du Tchad (National and Nomadic Guard), a state security force in Chad
- Genome News Network, an online magazine focused on genomics news
- Global Network Navigator, an early commercial Web publication
- Global News Network, a news channel in the Philippines
- Goodnight Nurse, a New Zealand alternative rock band
- Graph neural network, a class of neural network for processing data best represented by graph data structures
- Guerrilla News Network, a defunct news website and TV studio
- JA:GNN Web News, Japanese Web newsmagazine
