= Fergus Walsh =

British journalist (born 1961)

- Born: September 1961 (age 64); Leicester, Leicestershire, England
- Education: Royal Grammar School, High Wycombe
- Alma mater: University of Leeds; University College Falmouth
- Occupation: Journalist
- Employer: BBC
- Title: Medical Editor of BBC News (2020–present)

Fergus Walsh (born September 1961) is a British journalist who has been the BBC's medical editor since 2020, a newly created role, having previously been its long-time medical correspondent since 2006. He has won several awards for medical journalism, and has been commended for his work in making important health topics more understandable to the public.

== Education ==
He attended the Royal Grammar School in High Wycombe, and obtained an English literature degree from Leeds University in 1983. Walsh completed a post-graduate course in Broadcast Journalism at University College Falmouth, in Cornwall.

== Career ==
Walsh became the BBC's medical correspondent in 2004. In 2020 he was promoted to the newly created title of medical editor in recognition of his work in relation to the COVID-19 pandemic.

== Awards ==
He has won five broadcasting awards from the Medical Journalists' Association. In December 2009, he received an honorary degree, a Doctorate of Civil Law (DCL) from Newcastle University. His citation stated that he had "done more than any other journalist to facilitate public comprehension of the most challenging health issues of our times."

== Personal life ==
Fergus Walsh was born in September 1961. He is married and has a son and two daughters. His wife Dr Véronique Walsh, a former GP, works in the pharmaceutical industry as vice president of Gilead Sciences UK and Ireland.

In May 2020, Walsh announced he had tested positive for antibodies of COVID-19, during the global pandemic of the disease.

Media offices
| New title | Medical Editor: BBC News; 2020–present | Incumbent |
