= An Immense World =

2022 book by Ed Yong

An Immense World: How Animal Senses Reveal the Hidden Realms Around Us
- Author: Ed Yong
- Language: English
- Subject: Animal senses
- Publisher: Random House
- Publication date: June 21, 2022
- Pages: 464
- ISBN: 978-0-593-13323-1

An Immense World: How Animal Senses Reveal the Hidden Realms Around Us is a 2022 book by Ed Yong that examines animal senses.

== Reception ==
The book won the 2023 Andrew Carnegie Medal for Excellence in Nonfiction and the 2023 Royal Society Science Book Prize. It was selected for The New York Times's "10 Best Books of 2022" list.
