= A World Without Soil: The Past, Present, and Precarious Future of the Earth Beneath Our Feet =

2021 book by Jo Handelsman

- Cover
- Author: Jo Handelsman
- Language: English
- Subject: Soil conservation, environmental science, agriculture
- Genre: Non-fiction
- Publisher: Yale University Press
- Publication date: November 23, 2021
- Media type: Print (paperback), Digital
- Pages: 280
- Awards: The Association of American Publishers 2022 PROSE Category Award: Government & Politics, the 2023 Annual Thoughts Award in the Fourth Pingshan Natural History Book Award
- ISBN: 9780300271119
- Preceded by: Entering Mentoring:A Seminar to Train a New Generation of Scientists (2008)

A World Without Soil: The Past, Present, and Precarious Future of the Earth Beneath Our Feet is a 2021 book by American microbiologist Jo Handelsman with contributions by environmental researcher Kayla Cohen. Handelsman studies the global soil degradation and its implications for agriculture, the environment, and climate change. The author presents an urgent case for soil conservation, arguing that soil erosion and depletion pose significant risks to food security and planetary health. The book was longlisted for the 2023 Young Adult Science Book Award, and won the Association of American Publishers' 2022 PROSE Category Award: Government & Politics, and the 2023 Annual Thoughts Award in the Fourth Pingshan Natural History Book Award.

== Background ==
As Associate Director for Science at the White House Office of Science and Technology Policy under President Obama, Handelsman discovered that vast tracts of U.S. farmland were on track to lose their topsoil within decades. She drafted an urgent memo to inform the President and push for a national soil preservation initiative, but the memo was blocked for over a year, thus preventing action before the administration ended.

== Overview ==
The book examines soil as a vital but often overlooked resource. Soil is crucial for sustaining plant and microbial life, filtering water, storing carbon, and supporting ecosystems. Mollisols, among the world's most fertile soils, are being rapidly depleted due to modern agricultural practices, threatening global food security. Handelsman provides historical perspectives on soil use and degradation, and discusses how past civilizations have suffered due to soil mismanagement. She introduces the science behind soil formation and erosion, and explain the impact of agricultural practices, climate change, and industrialization.

Handelsman combines scientific research, policy analysis, and personal experience to advocate for sustainable farming practices such as no-till agriculture, cover cropping, and soil restoration initiatives. She argues that while soil erosion is accelerating, solutions exist to mitigate its impact if proactive steps are taken at local, national, and global levels. Handelsman emphasizes both modern technological approaches and ancient agricultural practices (e.g., Māori wholistic soil management and composting and Ifugao terraces) that have successfully preserved soil fertility. Handelsman praises traditional soil conservation methods (like those used in Scotland's Shetland Islands), that she acknowledges are unlikely to be scaled up to meet modern food demands, but she highlights the principles in traditional cultures that guide today's scalable soil conservation.

== Reviews ==
In his review, the co-founder of Urban Roots London, Richard S. Bloomfield, commended Handelsman for shedding light on the often-overlooked crisis of soil erosion. He underscored the alarming reality that topsoil loss now outpaces natural replenishment by up to 100 times. Bloomfield found Handelsman's ability to bridge soil science with broader food systems advocacy, aided by well-integrated illustrations, are invaluable. However, he critiqued the book for its limited engagement with the sociopolitical drivers of soil degradation. In particular, he noted that Handelsman's policy recommendations—such as carbon credit schemes tied to agribusiness giants like Cargill—risk undermining the very Indigenous practices she praises. While acknowledging the book's relevance amid U.S. (e.g., Farm Bill 2024) and Canadian agricultural policy debates, Bloomfield suggested pairing it with critical social theory works, such as Thinking With Soils, (Note: "Thinking with Soils: Material Politics and Social Theory" (2020) edited by Juan Francisco Salazar, Céline Granjou, Matthew Kearnes, Anna Krzywoszynska, and Manuel Tironi.) to more fully address the systemic inequities at play.

Emma Marris described the book as a compelling examination of soil erosion. She outlined alarming statistics, including a global soil erosion rate of 13.5 tonnes per hectare per year and an annual crop yield decline of 0.3%. Marris noted that in Iowa, up to 17% of land is nearly devoid of topsoil. The book presents traditional soil management techniques, such as the Ifugao rice terraces, the milpa system of the Maya, and Māori composting practices, as sustainable solutions. However, Marris critiqued the authors' policy recommendations, arguing that proposed measures such as international soil treaties and consumer-facing labels are insufficient. She advocated for stronger government intervention, including direct payments to farmers for soil conservation and a broader shift towards agriculture as a publicly supported stewardship role.

In his review, the President of the Global Coral Reef Alliance, (Note: A non-profit organization for coral reef protection and sustainable management.) Thomas J. F. Goreau, noted that Handelsman's book effectively covered contemporary soil conservation methods, such as cover cropping, contour plowing, and genetic improvements, but he criticized the limited discussion of biochar and soil remineralization using rock powders. Goreau argued that the book focused too much on biological and genetic solutions while under-emphasizing the role of balanced soil minerals in sustainable agriculture. Goreau found the author's account of political inaction particularly revealing, emphasizing that a critical memo on soil erosion was blocked from reaching President Barack Obama in the mid-2010s. He viewed this as a serious failure of political leadership in addressing long-term environmental challenges.

Elizabeth Kolbert acknowledged that Handelsman tackled a critical but largely ignored issue. Kolbert suggested that Handelsman conveyed a sense of exasperation over the world's lack of concern for soil loss, which came through in the book. While the author praised traditional soil conservation techniques, Kolbert pointed out that she at last conceded their impracticality for large-scale modern farming. The reviewer saw the book as well-researched and urgent but sensed Handelsman's frustration and lack of optimism about real-world change.

In his review, Daniel D. Richter said the book "presents a manifesto for improved soil conservation and management." Richter identified the work as part of a long tradition of warnings about soil loss but distinguished itself through Handelsman's optimism, as she believed soil degradation could be remedied quickly and at relatively low cost. While the author argued that improved soil management could serve as a powerful tool for mitigating climate change, Richter pointed out that many scientists found such large-scale initiatives impractical and overly optimistic. Despite acknowledging these criticisms, Handelsman remained confident in the potential of policy-driven solutions.

== Awards ==
- The Association of American Publishers' 2022 PROSE Category Award: Government & Politics
- The 2023 Annual Thoughts Award in the Fourth Pingshan Natural History Book Award
