= Medical Journalists' Association =

Professional association of British medical journalists

- Abbreviation: MJA
- Formation: 1 February 1967; 59 years ago
- Founded at: London, England
- Type: Professional organization
- Region served: Great Britain
- Members: 450 (2024)
- Chair: Shaun Lintern
- Vice chair: Emma Wilkinson
- Website: www.mjauk.org

The Medical Journalists' Association (abbreviated MJA) is a professional association for medical journalists in the United Kingdom. It was established in 1967 and held its first meeting on 1 February of that year in Ye Olde Cheshire Cheese, a famous pub off Fleet Street in London. Today, it has a membership of around 450 health and medical journalists working across a wide range of titles and platforms, including national newspapers and broadcasters and trade and specialist media.

The Annual Medical Journalists' Association Awards celebrate excellence across more than a dozen different categories, and include the prestigious Outstanding Contribution Award for the best of the best. In 2024 this was won by Hannah Barnes for her coverage of the Tavistock gender clinic and Cass Review and a moving account of birth trauma. Previous recipients of the award include BBC Medical Editor Fergus Walsh and Sunday Times Health Editor and current MJA chair Shaun Lintern.

Occasionally, the association also honours specific distinguished individuals in the field of medical journalism with a Lifetime Achievement Award; past recipients have included Professor Sir David Spiegelhalter, Oliver Gillie, Claire Rayner, and Jonathan Miller.

== See also ==
- Association of Health Care Journalists - similar nonprofit organization in United States
- Medizinjournalismus - medical journalism in Germany
