= Alan Boyle =

American journalist

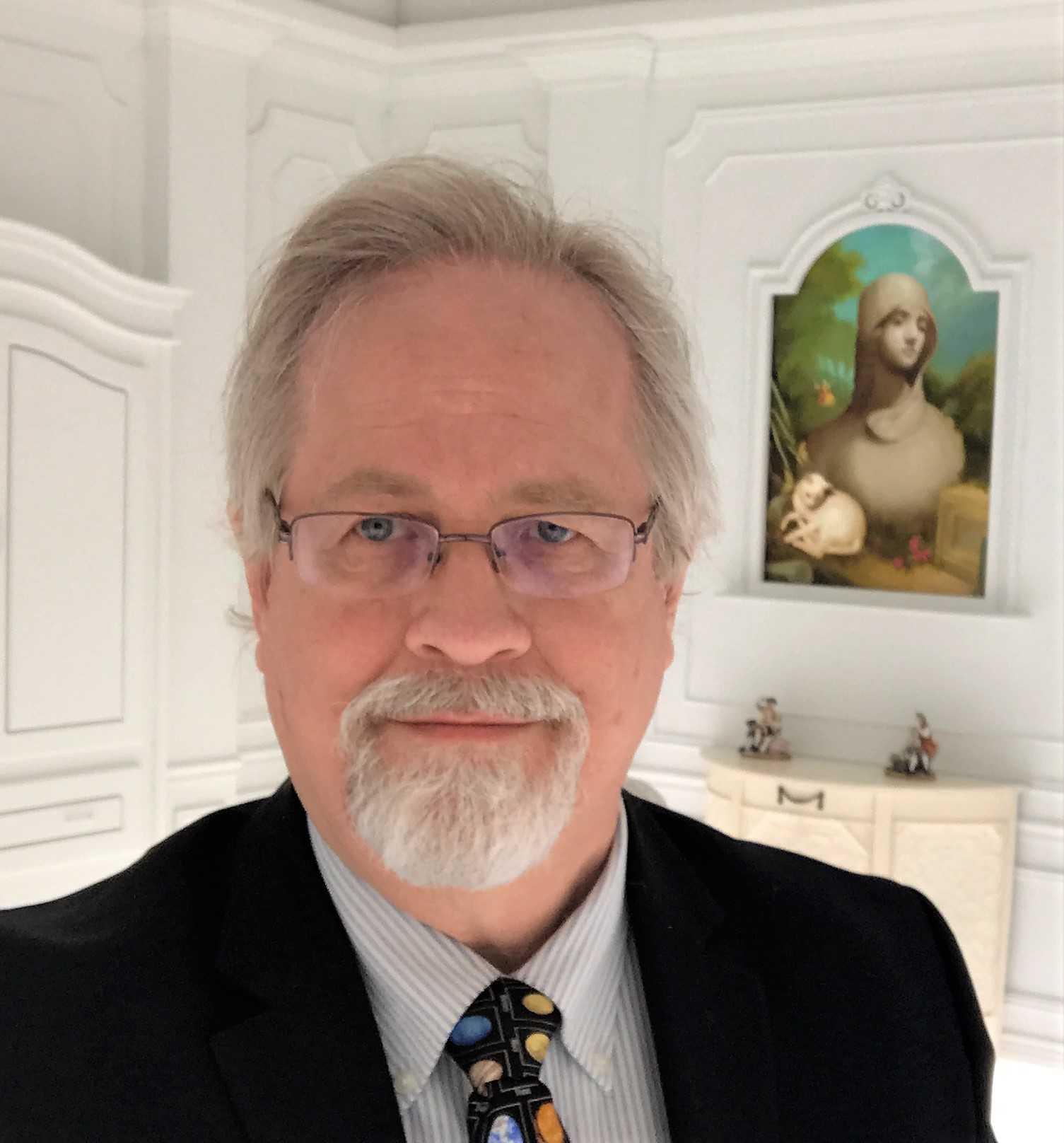
- Alan Boyle, April 2021

Alan Boyle is an American journalist specializing in science and technology news. He worked for msnbc.com and NBC News Digital as science editor from 1996 to 2015. In 2015, he became aerospace and science editor for GeekWire. Boyle is also a past president of the Council for the Advancement of Science Writing.

== Career ==
Boyle runs a virtual curiosity shop covering physical sciences, space exploration, paleontology, among many other interests of his. He joined NBC News Digital in 1996, and went on to GeekWire in 2015. He has maintained a blog called Cosmic Log, since 2002. During his career in journalism, he has worked in Cincinnati, Spokane, and Seattle.

== Honors and awards ==
He has received recognition from the American Association for the Advancement of Science in the form of the 2002 AAAS Science Journalism Award. He has also won awards from the National Academies, the National Association of Science Writers, the Society of Professional Journalists, the Space Frontier Foundation, IEEE-USA, the Pirelli Relativity Challenge and the CMU Cybersecurity Journalism Awards program.

== Bibliography ==
- Boyle, Alan (2009). The Case for Pluto: How a Little Planet Made a Big Difference. Wiley. ISBN 978-0-470-50544-1.
- Contributor to "A Field Guide for Science Writers"
