= Aeon (magazine) =

Digital magazine of ideas, philosophy, and culture

- Website type: Online magazine for culture, religion, politics, art, science, philosophy, psychology.
- Available in: English
- Owners: Aeon Media Group Ltd., Melbourne, Australia
- Editor: Brigid Hains
- Website: aeon.co
- Launched: 17 September 2012; 14 years ago
- Current status: active

Aeon is a digital magazine of ideas, philosophy and culture. Publishing new articles every weekday, Aeon describes itself as a publication that "asks the biggest questions and finds the freshest, most original answers, provided by world-leading authorities on science, philosophy and society." The magazine is published by Aeon Media Group, which has offices in London, New York, and Melbourne.

== History ==
Aeon was founded in London, England, in September 2012 by Paul and Brigid Hains, an Australian couple. It now has offices in London, Melbourne and New York. On 1 July 2016, Aeon became a registered charity with the Australian Charities and Not-For-Profits Commission, in the categories of advancing culture and advancing education. Aeon also registered its affiliate, Aeon America, as a 501(c)(3) charity in the US, in the education category. In April 2020, Aeon launched a sister site, Psyche magazine, named for the psyche concept in psychology, which publishes ideas, guides and videos on psychology, philosophy and the arts. In 2022, they launched SophiaClub, a "program of cultural events".

== Format ==
Aeon's content consists of long-form, in-depth essays and short documentaries under the banner of Aeon Video. Aeon also used to publish Aeon Ideas, which consisted of short-form articles. These are now published on the new publication, Psyche.

=== Aeon Video ===
Aeon Video's program is composed of curated selections, short documentaries that are exclusive to Aeon, and original series produced by Aeon. The most notable of these is the In Sight series, which features interviews and discussions with leading philosophers, scientists, thinkers and writers.

Several of Aeon's exclusives have been chosen as Vimeo Staff Picks, including Dramatic and Mild, American Renaissance, Grandpa and Me and a Helicopter to Heaven, Cutting Loose, Glas, and World Fair.

== Contributors ==
Contributors have been a wide array of academics, journalists, and science writers, including:

- Peter Adamson,
- Alain Badiou
- Julian Baggini
- Philip Bal
- Shahidha Bari
- Jamie Bartlett
- Matthew Battles
- Sven Birkerts
- Armand D'Angour
- David Deutsch
- Vincent T. DeVita
- Frans de Waal
- Vincenzo Di Nicola
- Tim Footman
- Allen Frances
- Karl J. Friston
- Jessa Gamble
- Michael Graziano
- Toby Green
- Pekka Hämäläinen
- Sabine Hossenfelder
- A. L. Kennedy
- Marek Kohn
- Olivia Laing
- Janna Levin
- Tim Lott
- Mahmood Mamdani
- Francis T. McAndrew
- George Musser
- Alondra Nelson
- Wendy Orent
- David Papineau
- Ruth Padel
- Massimo Pigliucci
- Steven Poole
- John Quiggin
- Emma Rothschild
- Claudio Saunt
- Anil Seth
- Dava Sobel
- Roger Scruton
- Eric Schwitzgebel
- Camilla Townsend
- Moshik Temkin
- Bryan W. Van Norden
- Nigel Warburton
- Margaret Wertheim
- E. O. Wilson
- Ed Yong
- David Wengrow

== Critical reception ==
Editorial director Brigid Hains won the Australasian Association of Philosophy's Media Professionals' Award in 2018.

Margaret Wertheim's essay "How to play mathematics" is featured in the anthology Best Writing on Mathematics 2018, published by Princeton University Press.

Rebecca Boyle's essay "The end of night" was featured in the anthology The Best American Science and Nature Writing 2015, under the title "The Health Effects of a World without Darkness".

Jessa Gamble's essay "The end of sleep?" was named the best feature of 2013 by the Association of British Science Writers.

In 2013, Hamish McKenzie of Pando Daily named Aeon the "best example of a magazine built for the age of mobile".

Many Aeon essays have been featured in the National Geographic Top Science Longreads: Ross Andersen's essay "The vanishing groves" was featured in 2012, and his essay "Omens" was featured in 2013; Lee Billings' essay "Drive-thru astronomy" was featured in 2013; and Veronique Greenwood's essay "Cows might fly" was also featured in 2013.

== Partnerships ==
Aeon has had partnerships with several organisations and publications, including the University of Cambridge: Centre for the Study of Existential Risk, Princeton University Press, MIT Press and HowTheLightGetsIn Festival. It has an audio partnership with the audio app, Curio.

== Creative Commons republication ==
The now-discontinued Ideas articles are available for republication under a Creative Commons license. These pieces have been syndicated by online media outlets such as The Atlantic and the BBC.
