= Jessa Gamble =

Canadian–English author (born 1979)

- Born: Jessa Sinclair; April 25, 1979 (age 47); Oxford, England
- Education: Lisgar Collegiate Institute; University of Toronto
- Occupations: Author, journalist

Jessa Gamble (born April 25, 1979), née Sinclair, is a Canadian and English author and co-owner of the science blog The Last Word on Nothing. Her book, The Siesta and the Midnight Sun: How Our Bodies Experience Time (Penguin Group), documents the rituals surrounding daily rhythms. Along with local languages and beliefs, these schedules are losing their global diversity and succumbing to what Gamble calls "circadian imperialism." The foreword was written by Canadian broadcaster Jay Ingram.

== Work ==
In recent years, Gamble has turned her attention to research on reducing the need for sleep by making it more efficient and concentrated. She is a regular commentator on issues around sleep, such as the morality of sleep, Seasonal Affective Disorder, and cultural differences in daily rhythms.

Gamble's work has appeared in The Guardian, as well as Aeon Magazine, Scientific American, New Scientist, The Walrus, The Atlantic, Canadian Geographic and Nature magazines.

At TED Global 2011 in Oxford, England, Gamble spoke about the natural sleep cycle of humans, which includes a two-hour waking period in the middle of the night. As of November 2018, the talk had more than two and a half million views.

While residing in Yellowknife, Northwest Territories, she worked as an editor at Up Here, the magazine about Canada's North, and served as writer in residence at the Yellowknife Public Library, mentoring local aspiring writers.

In September 2014, Palgrave Macmillan published her book collaboration with fund manager Guy Spier, "The Education of a Value Investor".

== Reception ==
The Canadian Science Writers Association bestowed a 2007 Science in Society journalism award for Gamble's first-person account of daily life at the Eureka High Arctic Weather Station. Her travelogue of a canoe trip through the Thelon Game Sanctuary on a quest for muskox was selected for inclusion in the Best Canadian Essays 2009 anthology and nominated for a National Magazine Award for Best Short Feature. One of her articles won the 2014 Best Feature award at the Science Writers' Awards for Britain and Ireland.
