= Stephen Battersby (science journalist) =

British science journalist

Stephen Battersby is a freelance science journalist who has been a News & Views editor at Nature and the features editor at New Scientist, where he has also served as an editorial consultant. He earned his bachelor's degree in physics from Oxford University, and his PhD in astrophysics from Imperial College London.

In 2015, Battersby received the Jonathan Eberhart Planetary Sciences Journalism Award for an article on methane tides on Titan, Saturn's largest moon.
