= Patrusky Lecture =

The Patrusky lecture series is held by the Council for the Advancement of Science Writing (CASW) in honor of Ben Patrusky, who retired from CASW in 2013 after 25 years as the executive director of CASW and 30 years as the director of the New Horizons in Science program. The first lecture was held in 2013 and the event has taken place every year since then.

== The Lecturers ==
- 2013 — George M. Whitesides
- 2014 — Donald Johanson
- 2015 — Jo Handelsman
- 2016 — Steven Weinberg
- 2017 — Susan Desmond-Hellmann
- 2018 — Shirley Tilghman
- 2019 — Steve Squyres
- 2020 — Ruha Benjamin
- 2021 — Katharine Hayhoe
- 2022 — Alyssa A. Goodman
- 2023 — Michael E. Mann
