= Michael Carroll (space artist) =

American artist

Michael W. Carroll is an astronomical artist and science writer. His art has appeared in magazines such as TIME, National Geographic, and Astronomy, and has flown aboard the Russian space station Mir and NASA's Phoenix Mars lander. He is also a founding member of the International Association of Astronomical Artists.

== Career ==
Carroll has written over 30 children's and adult books on subjects ranging from space to paleontology, including a Christian book series for children. He has been commissioned by NASA, the Jet Propulsion Laboratory, and the Planetary Society. Carroll was staff artist for the Reuben Fleet Space Theater, one of the world's largest planetariums and OMNIMAX theatres in San Diego.

=== International Association of Astronomical Artists ===
In 1981, a group of astronomical artists met in a space art show sponsored by the Planetary Society for the Society's Planetfest, held during the live transmission of close-up photos of Saturn by Voyager II. Carroll was curator of the exhibition. Artists in attendance organized several successive annual workshops; Carroll organized the second, held in Death Valley, California towards the end of 1983. With a rapidly growing membership, the IAAA (International Association of Astronomical Artists) was formally registered as an association of astronomical artists in 1986.

He was one of seven North American space artists invited by the Space Research Institute of the former USSR to attend the Space Future Forum in Moscow in 1987, where he consulted with Soviet scientists and artists. While there, he helped to establish the Dialogues project, a series of workshops and exhibitions involving Soviet, American and European artists. One of his digitized paintings was aboard Russia¹s doomed Mars 96 mission, an original flew aboard Mir, and a third is on the surface of Mars, in digital form, aboard the Phoenix Lander.

=== Awards ===
Carroll is the recipient of the 2006 Lucien Rudaux Memorial Award for lifetime achievement in the astronomical arts.

In 2012, he received the American Astronomical Society Division for Planetary Sciences's Jonathan Eberhart Planetary Sciences Journalism Award. In 2017, he received a Congressional Medal for his participation in an expedition to Antarctica's Mount Erebus.

== Bibliography ==
=== Books ===
- Space Art. Watson Guptill. 2007. ISBN 9780823048762.
- The Seventh Landing: going back to the Moon, this time to stay. Springer. 2009. ISBN 9780387938806.
- Drifting on Alien Winds: Exploring the Skies and Weather of Other Worlds. Springer. 2011. ISBN 9781441969163.
- Living Among Giants: Exploring and Settling the Outer Solar System. Springer. 2014. ISBN 9783319106731.
- On the Shores of Titan's Farthest Sea: A Scientific Novel. Springer. 2015. ISBN 9783319177595.
- Earths of Distant Suns. Springer. 2016. ISBN 978-3319439631.
- Europa's Lost Expedition: A Scientific Novel. Springer. 2017. ISBN 978-3319431581.
- Antarctica: Earth's Own Ice World. Praxis, 2018. ISBN 978-3-319-74624-1
- Lords of the Ice Moons: A Scientific Novel. Springer, 2019. ISBN 3319981544
- Planet Earth, past and present: parallels between our world and its celestial neighbors. Cham: Springer, 2023.

=== Articles ===
- "Futuropolis : how NASA plans to create a permanent presence on the Moon". Analog. 129 (6): 26–34. June 2009.
- "Musings from the First Generation". Analog. 129 (7): 138–141. July–August 2009.
- "Really big tourism". Science Fact. Analog Science Fiction and Fact. 135 (6): 28–33. June 2015.
