= Oliver Gillie =

British journalist and scientist (1937–2021)

- Born: 31 October 1937; Northumberland, England, U.K.
- Died: 15 May 2021 (aged 83)
- Education: University of Edinburgh
- Scientific career
- Fields: Genetics
- Thesis: Growth and genetic control of enzyme level in Neurospora. (1965)
- Doctoral advisor: Conrad H. Waddington

Oliver J. Gillie (31 October 1937 – 15 May 2021) was a British journalist and scientist. He previously served as the medical correspondent for The Sunday Times, and later medical editor for The Independent.

In 2014, he was awarded the Medical Journalists' Association Lifetime Achievement Award for his work.

== Education ==
He held a BSc and PhD in genetics, both from Edinburgh University, where he studied at the Institute of Animal Genetics under Conrad H. Waddington. His PhD thesis was "Growth and genetic control of enzyme level in Neurospora". After his PhD he won a Fulbright scholarship to Stanford in California.

== Career ==
Among his most notable journalistic work was being the first to publicly accuse Cyril Burt of scientific fraud. In 1976, Gillie published an article claiming that Burt had fabricated much of the data he had included in his publications, as well as two women whom Burt claimed had been his research assistants, but whom Gillie concluded had never existed. He reached this conclusion after investigating to find evidence that either woman (Margaret Howard and Jane Conway) had ever existed, talking to people who had known Burt for many years. He had also talked to human intelligence researchers who told him that Burt's data was suspect. He has also researched the adverse health effects of vitamin D deficiency, specifically, that caused by insufficient exposure to sunlight.

== Personal life ==
Gillie was born in North Shields, Northumberland and was the second of three brothers. His father, John Gillie, was a nautical instrument maker and his mother, Ann (née Philipson), studied fine art in Newcastle and Paris. He went to local schools and then graduated with a first-class degree in natural sciences at Edinburgh. He had a strawberry birthmark on his left cheek and neck, which he believed cost him a place at Cambridge University. The don who interviewed him had a much more obvious birthmark, and Gillie believed the ensuing embarrassment had a negative effect on the interview.

He was from a Quaker background, and was brought up as a pacifist. He believed people should live well and respect their bodies, always opting for a healthy lifestyle.

He had three marriages. In 1964, he married Walpurga Hesper, who was Dutch. They were married in Rotterdam. After the premature birth and death of a daughter called Frances, born in Edinburgh, the couple divorced in 1968. In 1969, he married his second wife Louise Panton, a documentary film-maker, and they had two daughters, Lucy and Juliet, but divorced in 1991. In 1999, he married Jan Thompson, a journalist and managing editor of The Guardian, and they had two sons, Calder and Sholto.

On 15 May 2021, Gillie died at the age of 83. He had been suffering from lymphocytic leukaemia.
