= Jonathan Eberhart Planetary Sciences Journalism Award =

The Jonathan Eberhart Planetary Sciences Journalism Award was established by the Division for Planetary Sciences to recognize and stimulate distinguished popular writing on planetary sciences. The winning author (or authors) receives (or divide) a prize of $1,000, plus a citation. The award is named after science journalist Jonathan Eberhart.

== Jonathan Eberhart Planetary Sciences Journalism Award winners ==
- 2009 J. Kelly Beatty
- 2010 George Musser
- 2011 Emily Lakdawalla
- 2012 Michael Carroll
- 2013 Richard A. Kerr
- 2014 James Oberg
- 2015 Stephen Battersby
- 2016 Nadia Drake
- 2017 Joshua Sokol
- 2018 Alexandra Witze
- 2019 Rebecca Boyle
- 2020 Christopher Crockett

== See also ==
- List of astronomy awards
