= Kendra Pierre-Louis =

American climate reporter and journalist

- Education: Massachusetts Institute of Technology; SIT Graduate Institute; Cornell University
- Occupation: journalist
- Writing career
- Language: English; Spanish; Haitian Creole
- Genre: climate change

Kendra Pierre-Louis is an American climate reporter and journalist. She most recently worked at Gimlet Media as a reporter and producer on the podcast How to Save a Planet, featuring Alex Blumberg and Ayana Elizabeth Johnson.

== Career ==
Pierre-Louis previously worked at Gimlet Media, The New York Times and Popular Science. Her work has also appeared in Aeon, FiveThirtyEight, Sierra, InsideClimate News, Newsweek and The Washington Post. She also worked as a researcher for Terrapin Bright Green, an environmental consulting and strategic planning firm.

Her 2012 book, Green Washed: Why We Can't Buy Our Way to a Green Planet, argues that individual action and consumption capitalism do not support climate action. It was reviewed positively by Climate and Capitalism reviewer Ian Angus. Kirkus Reviews called the book "a slim but revealing investigation."

Pierre-Louis was a featured author in the book All We Can Save, contributing an essay examining what the fictional country of Wakanda can teach about climate adaptation.

== Personal life ==
Pierre-Louis is a first-generation American born to Haitian parents and was raised speaking Spanish and Haitian Creole.

She has a Master of Science in Science Writing from the Massachusetts Institute of Technology, a Master of Art in Sustainable Development from the SIT Graduate Institute, and a Bachelor of Art in Economics from Cornell University. During her graduate studies, she received a Taylor/Blakeslee University Fellowship for science writing.

She has repeatedly criticized mayonnaise, going so far as to publish an essay in Popular Science in 2017, calling the condiment "disgusting".

== Awards and recognition ==
Pierre-Louis received a Sagebrush Country Institute Fellowship in 2015, and a Bringing Home the World Fellowship from the International Center for Journalists in 2016. In 2017, Pierre-Louis was selected by the National Press Foundation for national environmental journalist training. In 2020, Pierre-Louis was named Science Writer in Residence by the University of Wisconsin-Madison.

In 2019 Bustle named her one of its "25 Climate Scientists and Experts to Follow on Twitter" for climate information. She also delivered the keynote speech at the 2019 Oppenheimer Media Ethics Symposium at the University of Idaho.
