= Bijal P. Trivedi =

American science journalist

- Education: Oberlin College; University of California, Los Angeles; New York University
- Occupation: Science journalist
- Employer: Genome News Network; National Geographic; The Conversation
- Children: 2
- Awards: Guggenheim Fellowship (2025)

Bijal Pravin Trivedi is an American science journalist. After studying in biochemistry and biology, she switched to journalism and has since then worked for Genome News Network, National Geographic, and The Conversation US, serving as a science editor for the last two outlets. She published one book, Breath From Salt (2020), and is a 2025 Guggenheim Fellow.

== Biography ==
Trivedi studied at Oberlin College, where she obtained a bachelor's degree in biochemistry, and at University of California, Los Angeles, where she obtained a master's degree in molecular, cell, and developmental biology. She later became interested in journalism instead of science, and she attended New York University's Science, Health, and Environmental Reporting Program (SHERP), being taught by Dan Fagin and graduating in 1998.

After working for the Genome News Network staff, she worked for the National Geographic News Service from 2001 to 2004. She later worked for The Conversation US as science and technology editor. She won the 2006 Wistar Institute Science Journalism Award for her New Scientist article on gut microbiota, as well as the Foundation for Biomedical Research's 2006 Michael E. DeBakey Journalism Award and the 2009 National Institutes of Health Plain Language Award. Her Scientific American article, titled "The Wipeout Gene", appeared in Best American Science and Nature Writing 2012. She also worked as editor for the National Institutes of Health Director's Blog and as a teacher at the SHERP.

In September 2020, Trivedi's book Breath From Salt, on the history of the genetic disease cystic fibrosis, was published by BenBella Books. The book traces the history of the disease from its discovery in the 1930s by Dorothy Andersen, which was at the time was a "death sentence" to children, to the development of the breakthrough drug ivacaftor in 2012, followed by Orkambi and Trikafta, and the "weeping with joy" of patients and families as the disease became for many a manageable, non-fatal condition. The book uses the stories of children with cystic fibrosis, their families, the doctors and researchers studying the disease, and the philanthropists and national organizations who advocated and raised funds for scientific research. The book is centered on the story of Joe and Kathy O'Donnell, a Massachusetts couple whose son Joey had cystic fibrosis, dying at the age of 12 in 1986. Their son's struggle with the disease and ultimate death inspired the couple to raise hundreds of millions of dollars to fund CF research.

In 2021, Trivedi returned to National Geographic, eventually becoming their senior editor for science. In 2022, she won the inaugural Sharon Begley Award for Science Reporting. In 2025, she was awarded a Guggenheim Fellowship in Science Writing.

== Personal life ==
Trivedi lives in Washington, D.C. She has two children with her husband Chad. She is dyslexic, using Otter.ai to transcribe any interview she records.

== Bibliography ==
- Breath From Salt (2020)
