= George Musser =

American science writer (born 1965)

- Born: 1965 (age 60–61)
- Education: Brown University; Cornell University
- Occupations: Science writer, editor
- Writing career
- Subjects: Fundamental physics, space science, consciousness
- Notable awards: Jonathan Eberhart Planetary Sciences Journalism Award (2010); AIP Science Writing Award (2011)
- Website: georgemusser.com

George Musser (born 1965) is an American science writer and editor who specializes in space science and fundamental physics. A former senior editor at Scientific American, he is a contributing editor to Scientific American and Nautilus and a contributing writer to Quanta Magazine. He has written four books on fundamental physics and its connections to philosophy, neuroscience and artificial intelligence, including Spooky Action at a Distance (2015) and Putting Ourselves Back in the Equation (2023).

Musser received the Jonathan Eberhart Planetary Sciences Journalism Award in 2010 and the Science Writing Award of the American Institute of Physics in 2011. He has held fellowships and residencies at the Massachusetts Institute of Technology, the Kavli Institute for Theoretical Physics and the Institute for Advanced Study.

== Education ==
Musser studied electrical engineering and mathematics as an undergraduate at Brown University and did graduate work in planetary science at Cornell University. At Cornell he worked with Steven W. Squyres on the geophysics of Venus. Their 1997 paper in the Journal of Geophysical Research modeled how buoyant bodies of material rising through the Venusian mantle, known as diapirs, could produce the circular surface features called coronae.

== Career ==
=== Magazine editing ===
From 1994 to 1998 Musser was editor of Mercury, the magazine of the Astronomical Society of the Pacific, and of the society's The Universe in the Classroom tutorial series. He then joined Scientific American, where as a senior editor he focused on space science and fundamental physics. As a senior editor he shared in two National Magazine Awards. He originated and was one of the lead editors of the special issue "A Matter of Time" (September 2002), which won a National Magazine Award, and he coordinated the special issue "Crossroads for Planet Earth" (September 2005), which received a Global Media Award from the Population Institute and was a National Magazine Award finalist. By 2015 he had become a contributing editor at the magazine.

=== Freelance writing ===
As a freelance writer, Musser has written for Science, Nature, Quanta Magazine, Aeon, Nautilus and The New York Times. His articles for Quanta in 2025 and 2026 covered topics including entropic gravity and zero-point energy.

=== Fellowships and residencies ===
In October 2011 Musser became writer in residence at the Centre for Quantum Technologies in Singapore for two months, and from March to May 2012 he was writer in residence at the Kavli Institute for Theoretical Physics at the University of California, Santa Barbara. He was a Knight Science Journalism Fellow at MIT from 2014 to 2015. From November 2018 to February 2019, he was at the Institute for Advanced Study in Princeton, New Jersey, where he began a book project on physics, neuroscience and artificial intelligence. In June and July 2023, he was a visiting fellow in the "Foundations of Physics" research focus at the Center for Advanced Studies of LMU Munich. At the 12th Heidelberg Laureate Forum in September 2025, he moderated a panel on machine learning in mathematics and science.

== Books ==
Musser's first book, The Complete Idiot's Guide to String Theory, an introduction to string theory for general readers, was published by Alpha Books in 2008.

=== Spooky Action at a Distance ===
Spooky Action at a Distance, published by Scientific American/Farrar, Straus and Giroux in November 2015, is about nonlocality, the apparent ability of objects to affect one another without anything passing through the space between them. Musser follows the idea from ancient Greek philosophy and Newton's theory of gravity to quantum entanglement, and considers what it may reveal about black holes, the Big Bang and unified theories of physics.

Publishers Weekly called the book "accessible and imaginative" and praised the clarity and humor of Musser's writing, and Kirkus Reviews commended the energy with which he handled difficult science and introduced the physicists working on the problem. The book was longlisted for the 2016 PEN/E. O. Wilson Literary Science Writing Award.

=== Emergence in Condensed Matter and Quantum Gravity ===
In 2022 Springer published Emergence in Condensed Matter and Quantum Gravity: A Nontechnical Review, a short book on emergent behavior in two fields: condensed matter physics, including exotic phases of matter such as superconductors and topological insulators, and quantum gravity, in which space and time may emerge from a deeper level of physics. The book grew out of a report Musser wrote for the Foundational Questions Institute (FQXi) with support from the John Templeton Foundation.

=== Putting Ourselves Back in the Equation ===
Putting Ourselves Back in the Equation: Why Physicists Are Studying Human Consciousness and AI to Unravel the Mysteries of the Universe was published by Farrar, Straus and Giroux in November 2023. Based on interviews with researchers in several fields, it examines how physicists have taken up questions about the mind, from the role of observers in quantum mechanics to artificial neural networks and theories of consciousness such as integrated information theory.

Publishers Weekly praised Musser's ability to make complex science accessible, and Kirkus Reviews found the book insightful on how the study of consciousness connects with artificial intelligence, cosmology and quantum physics, while cautioning that it was demanding reading. In a review for Science, Chaz Firestone and Ian Phillips of Johns Hopkins University called it "ambitious but ultimately disappointing", arguing that it largely left out psychology, was too credulous about the abilities of AI systems such as ChatGPT, and did not engage seriously enough with criticisms of integrated information theory.

== Awards and honors ==
- 2010: Jonathan Eberhart Planetary Sciences Journalism Award, Division for Planetary Sciences of the American Astronomical Society
- 2011: Science Writing Award, American Institute of Physics, for the Scientific American article "Could Time End?"
- 2016: Longlist, PEN/E. O. Wilson Literary Science Writing Award, for Spooky Action at a Distance

== Personal life ==
Musser lives in Glen Ridge, New Jersey.

== Selected works ==
=== Books ===
- Musser, George (2008). The Complete Idiot's Guide to String Theory. Alpha Books. ISBN 978-1-59257-702-6.
- Musser, George (2015). Spooky Action at a Distance. New York: Scientific American/Farrar, Straus and Giroux. ISBN 978-0-374-29851-7.
- Musser, George (2022). Emergence in Condensed Matter and Quantum Gravity: A Nontechnical Review. SpringerBriefs in Physics. Cham: Springer. doi:10.1007/978-3-031-09895-6. ISBN 978-3-031-09894-9.
- Musser, George (2023). Putting Ourselves Back in the Equation: Why Physicists Are Studying Human Consciousness and AI to Unravel the Mysteries of the Universe. New York: Farrar, Straus and Giroux. ISBN 978-0-374-23876-6.

=== Articles ===
- Musser, George (September 2010). "Could Time End?". Scientific American. Vol. 303, no. 3. pp. 84–91.
- Musser, George (May 2019). "Artificial Imagination: How machines could learn creativity and common sense, among other human qualities". Scientific American. Vol. 320, no. 5. pp. 58–63.
- Musser, George (March 28, 2026). "Unlocking consciousness". New Scientist. Vol. 269, no. 3588. pp. 30–33. doi:10.1016/S0262-4079(26)00516-6.
