= Richard Kerr (science journalist) =

Richard A. Kerr, also known as Dick Kerr, is a science journalist and former staff writer for Science.

Kerr completed a BA (chemistry) at the College of Wooster in 1968. A year as a research chemist in the Ocean Sciences Division of the Naval Research Laboratory in Washington, DC, was followed during the Vietnam War three years as an Navy officer aboard the fleet oiler USS Ponchatoula. Kerr then completed a PhD (oceanography) at the University of Rhode Island, where he also "surreptitiously" took classes in magazine writing and news reporting. In 1977, a week after defending his dissertation, he accepted a job as a geophysics writer for Science; he was soon promoted to senior writer, and began covering Earth and planetary sciences.

Kerr is a 1995 Fellow of the Geological Society of America.

== Honors and awards ==
- 1990 American Meteorological Society Special Award "for the consistently high quality of his articles in Science on developments and issues in the atmospheric sciences."
- 1993 Robert G. Cowen Award for Sustained Achievement in Science Journalism from the American Geophysical Union
- 1994 National Association of Geoscience Teachers James Shea Award
- 1995 Outstanding Contribution to Public Understanding of Geology Award from the American Geological Institute
- 2006 Geological Society of America Public Service Award
- 2013 Jonathan Eberhart Planetary Sciences Journalism Award for his article "Peering Inside the Moon to Read Its Earliest History."
