= Hippocrates Med Review =

Student journal at the Johns Hopkins University

- Categories: Health, Journalism
- Founder: Rushabh Doshi
- Founded: 2016
- First issue: 2017
- Country: United States
- Based in: Baltimore, Maryland
- Website: hippocratesmedrevieworg.wordpress.com//
- ISSN: 2475-4625

The Hippocrates Med Review (HMR) is an independent student journal at the Johns Hopkins University in Baltimore, Maryland. Founded in 2016, the Hippocrates Med Review is a medical journal that promotes patient education. They were the recipient of the Johns Hopkins University Ten by Twenty Idealab Challenge put out by President Ronald J. Daniels.

The review is published every semester in a full-color magazine format. Its total circulation is approximately 1,200, including the local campuses of Johns Hopkins, area colleges, and private hospitals in the greater Baltimore region. A mobile app was released on April 18, 2018. It also launched the Osler Medical Symposium, a student-run lecture series that calls on prominent leaders in medicine to speak about the current state of medicine.

In 2021, the review expanded to the University of Pittsburgh. marking its first chapter outside of Johns Hopkins University.

== Awards ==
Johns Hopkins' President Ronald J. Daniels issued a challenge to the community to offer ideas to advance one of the priorities of the university's Ten by Twenty vision, offering $20,000 to the top two ideas to bring their ideas to fruition. Hippocrates Med Review, a start up at the time, was chosen as one of the two winners for this Ten by Twenty IdeaLab Challenge.
