= Association of Health Care Journalists =

Independent nonprofit organization

- Founded: 1998
- Type: Non-governmental
- Website: healthjournalism.org

The Association of Health Care Journalists is an independent, nonprofit organization dedicated to advancing public understanding of health care issues. Its mission is to improve the quality, accuracy and visibility of health care reporting, writing and editing. There are more than 1,500 members of AHCJ.

The current Board of Directors includes professionals from The Boston Globe, STAT, the University of Georgia, NPR, MedPage Today, and The Des Moines Register.

== History ==
The Association incorporated in 1998 and procured 501(c)(3) status in 1999. In 2004 (at the fifth national conference in Minneapolis), the membership approved the conversion of the Association to a 501(c)6 trade association with a supporting 501(c)(3) charitable organization - the Center for Excellence in Health Care Journalism. The association holds annual meetings, publishes newsletters, operates a website and advocates on behalf of health journalists and the free flow of information. The Center presents training events, publishes educational materials and undertakes other educational projects aimed at improving the state of health journalism.

Since its inception, AHCJ has grown to more than 1,500 members.

Its offerings to journalists and other media professionals include ongoing fellowship programs like the AHCJ-CDC Health Journalism Fellowship (2008), the Reporting Fellowship on Health Care Performance (2011), the Comparative Effectiveness Research Fellowship (2015), the National Cancer Reporting Fellowship (2016), the International Health Study Fellowship (2018) and the Science-Health-Environment Reporting Fellowship (2021).

AHCJ has published resource guides and provided training opportunities through national and international agencies like the Centers for Disease Control, the National Cancer Institute and the World Health Organization.

For nearly two decades, AHCJ has recognized health reporting through its Awards for Excellence in Health Care Journalism. The annual Health Journalism conference and other regional workshops and summits have been held in nearly 50 locations across the U.S.

== Resources ==
AHCJ and the Center offer a number of resources and services intended to help journalists do in-depth and accurate reporting on health and health care issues. Its initiatives include the Awards for Excellence in Health Care Journalism, an active Web site and blog, annual conferences, smaller training events, online training, and fellowships.

== Awards ==
The Awards for Excellence in Health Care Journalism are notable as the only awards program for health journalism that is not influenced or funded by commercial or special-interest groups, an issue that has received scrutiny recently.

The Association advocates for high ethical standards in health care reporting and has taken a position against news organizations entering into arrangements with hospitals that improperly influence health coverage, urged reporters to resist signing confidentiality agreements with hospitals and opposed secrecy clauses in contracts between medical device manufacturers and hospitals.

== See also ==
- Medical Journalists' Association - similar professional organization in United Kingdom
- Medizinjournalismus - medical journalism in Germany
