= Adriana Gallardo =

American journalist and editor

- Born: Central Mexico
- Occupations: Journalist; Editor; Professor
- Employer: NPR Morning Edition
- Known for: ProPublica investigations; NPR Morning Edition editor
- Awards: Pulitzer Prize for Public Service; Peabody Award; Ellie Award

Adriana Gallardo is a Mexican journalist, editor, and educator who serves as an editor for NPR's Morning Edition, focusing on books and author interviews.

== Early life ==
Gallardo was born in central Mexico and immigrated to the United States as an undocumented child in the late 1980s. She grew up in the Chicago suburbs in a family of janitors.

== Career ==
=== ProPublica ===
Gallardo joined ProPublica in 2016 as an engagement reporter. During her seven-year tenure, she collaborated on investigative series covering women's health, immigration, and sexual violence.

Her notable projects included:

- "Lost Mothers" (2018) - A Pulitzer Prize finalist series for explanatory reporting
- "Lawless" (2020) - A collaboration with the Anchorage Daily News about sexual violence in Alaska, which won the Pulitzer Prize for Public Service
- "Unheard" (2021) - An engagement reporting project from the "Lawless" series

=== Innovative Reporting Methods ===
At ProPublica, Gallardo developed innovative community engagement methods. During the "Lost Mothers" series, she pioneered a unique approach to gathering stories about black maternal mortality, drawing from her experience at StoryCorps to record conversations between women about their experiences.

=== Public Radio ===
Before ProPublica, Gallardo oversaw a national reporting series at 15 public media stations and traveled with the StoryCorps mobile booth, collecting hundreds of stories archived at the Library of Congress. She currently serves as an editor for NPR's Morning Edition, the most listened-to news radio program in the United States.

=== Teaching ===
Gallardo teaches at the Dart Center for Journalism and Trauma and serves as an adjunct professor at the Craig Newmark Graduate School of Journalism at City University of New York.

== Writing ==
Gallardo is an essayist represented by the Stuart Krichevsky Literary Agency. Her work has appeared in Guernica, Catapult, and in Daughters of Latin America, a 2023 anthology available in English and Spanish.

== Awards and recognition ==
- Pulitzer Prize for Public Service (2020) - For "Lawless" investigation
- Peabody Award
- Ellie Award
- Dart Award for Excellence in Coverage of Trauma (2021) - For "Unheard"
- Ancil Payne Award for Ethics in Journalism (2021)
- Ethics in Journalism Award from the Society of Professional Journalists (2021)
