= Journal of Investigative Medicine =

- Discipline: Biomedicine
- Language: English
- Edited by: Michael McPhaul

Publication details
- History: 1995-present
- Publisher: BMJ Publishing Group
- Frequency: 8/year
- Impact factor: 2.029 (2017)

Standard abbreviations
- ISO 4: J. Investig. Med.

Indexing
- ISSN: 1081-5589 (print); 1708-8267 (web)
- LCCN: 95641341
- OCLC no.: 716790654

Links
- Journal homepage; Online access; Online archive

The Journal of Investigative Medicine, also abbreviated JIM, is a peer-reviewed medical journal covering all aspects of biomedicine. It was established in 1995 and is published eight times per year by BMJ Publishing Group on behalf of the American Federation for Medical Research, of which it is the official journal. The editor-in-chief is Michael J. McPhaul (Quest Diagnostics Nichols Institute). According to the Journal Citation Reports, the journal has a 2017 impact factor of 2.029.
