= Wendy Orent =

American anthropologist and science writer

Wendy Orent is an American anthropologist and science writer with a focus on pandemics, biological weapons, and the evolution of infectious diseases.

== Life ==
Orent assisted Russian scientist Igor Domaradskij in the writing of his memoir, Biowarrior: Inside the Soviet/Russian Biological War Machine. Domaradskij credits himself with much of the research leading to the creation of an antibiotic resistant strain of Yersinia pestis, the plague germ. Domaradskij, the co-designer of the entire Soviet biological weapons program known as Biopreparat, carried out the research leading to the creation of an antibiotic resistant strain of Yersinia pestis, the plague germ. She discussed this in her own book, Plague: The Mysterious Past and Terrifying Future of the World's Most Dangerous Disease.
