= Nadia Drake =

American science journalist (born 1980)

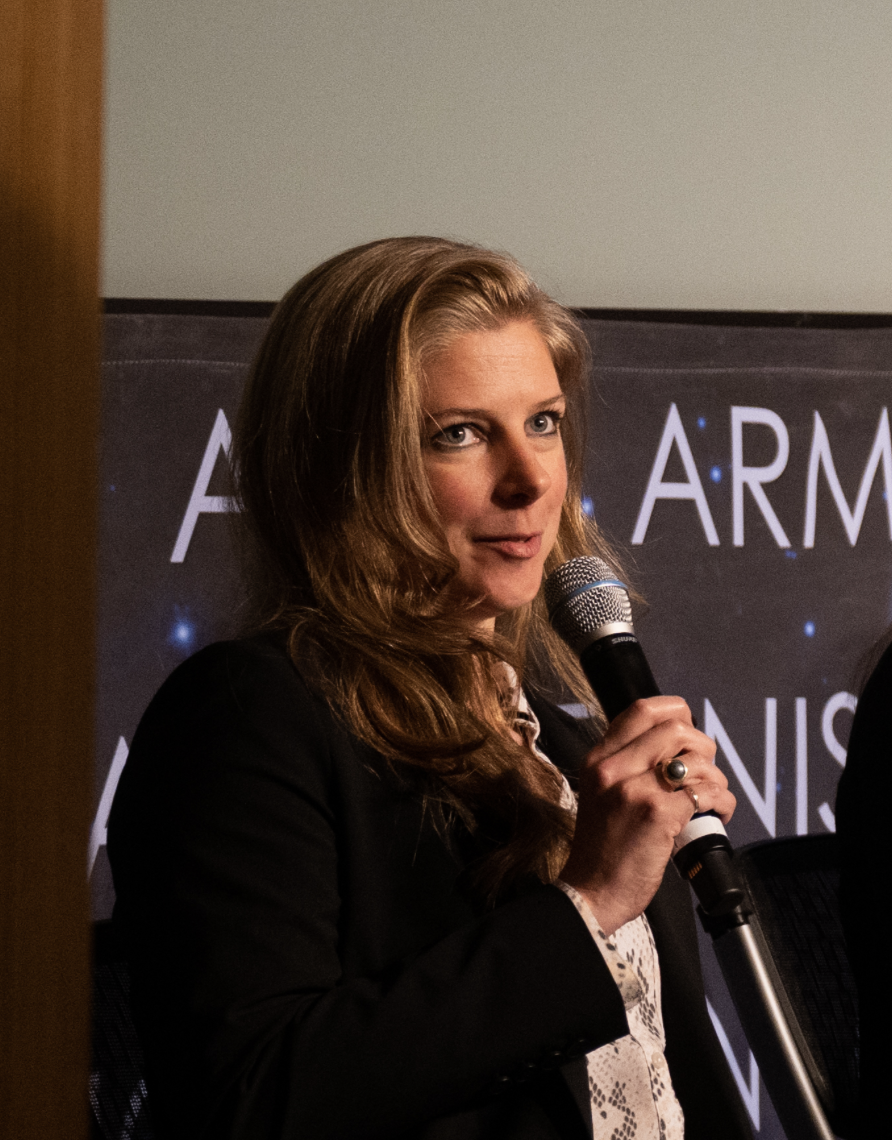
- Drake at NASA Headquarters in 2023
- Education: Cornell University (AB, PhD); University of California, Santa Cruz (MS)
- Occupation: Science journalist
- Parent(s): Frank Drake; Amahl Shakhashiri Drake

Nadia Drake is an American science journalist of Lebanese descent who specializes in covering space exploration, space science, and the search for life beyond Earth. Currently freelance, she was a long-time contributing writer at National Geographic and formerly the interim Physics Editor at Quanta Magazine.

== Early life and education ==
Drake grew up near Santa Cruz, California.

In 2002, she earned an AB in biology, psychology, and dance at Cornell University.

She returned to Cornell for her PhD in genetics and developmental biology in 2004, and defended her dissertation in 2009. Her PhD thesis is titled Phenotypic consequences of imprinting perturbations at Rasgrf1 in mouse.

In 2011 she graduated from the Science Communication (SciCom) program at UC Santa Cruz.

== Career ==
Drake worked in a clinical genetics lab at the Johns Hopkins University School of Medicine after earning her undergraduate degree from Cornell University.

During her residence at the UCSC's SciCom program, she was a reporting intern for the Santa Cruz Sentinel, The San Jose Mercury News, and Nature.

Afterwards she moved to Washington, D.C. for an internship at Science News, which turned into a job as the magazine's astronomy reporter.

Drake then returned to the San Francisco Bay Area for a science reporting job at Wired.

After that, she was hired as a contributing writer at National Geographic, where she wrote digital news stories and print magazine features until 2023. She has also been a freelance contributor for publications including to Scientific American, The New York Times, The Wall Street Journal, and The Atlantic.

In 2022, NASA appointed Drake to its Unidentified Anomalous Phenomena independent study panel, where she was one of 16 experts tasked with identifying a role for the agency in addressing the question of UAP.

Since 2024, Drake has been working as a consultant with ETH-Zurich; in 2024 she joined the board of directors of the SETI Institute as observer.

== Book ==
Drake is the author of Little Book of Wonders: Celebrating the Gifts of the Natural World (National Geographic Books, 2016).

== Awards and honours ==
- In 2016 Drake received the American Astronomical Society's Jonathan Eberhart Planetary Sciences Journalism Award for her article "Scientists in Flying Telescope Race to Intercept Pluto's Shadow," which appeared July 3, 2015, on National Geographic's website.
- In 2017 she won the David N. Schramm Award for High Energy Astrophysics Science Journalism from the High Energy Astrophysics Division of the American Astronomical Society for "Found! Gravitational Waves, or a Wrinkle in Spacetime" which was published on National Geographic's website on February 11, 2016.
- In 2024, the American Geophysical Union awarded its Walter M. Sullivan award to Drake for “The Alien Moon Shot,” a feature that was National Geographic’s cover story in October 2023.

== Personal life ==
Drake is the daughter of SETI pioneer Frank Drake and Amahl Drake (née Shakhashiri). Her mother is from Lebanon and emigrated as a teenager.
