= Amy Maxmen =

American science writer and journalist

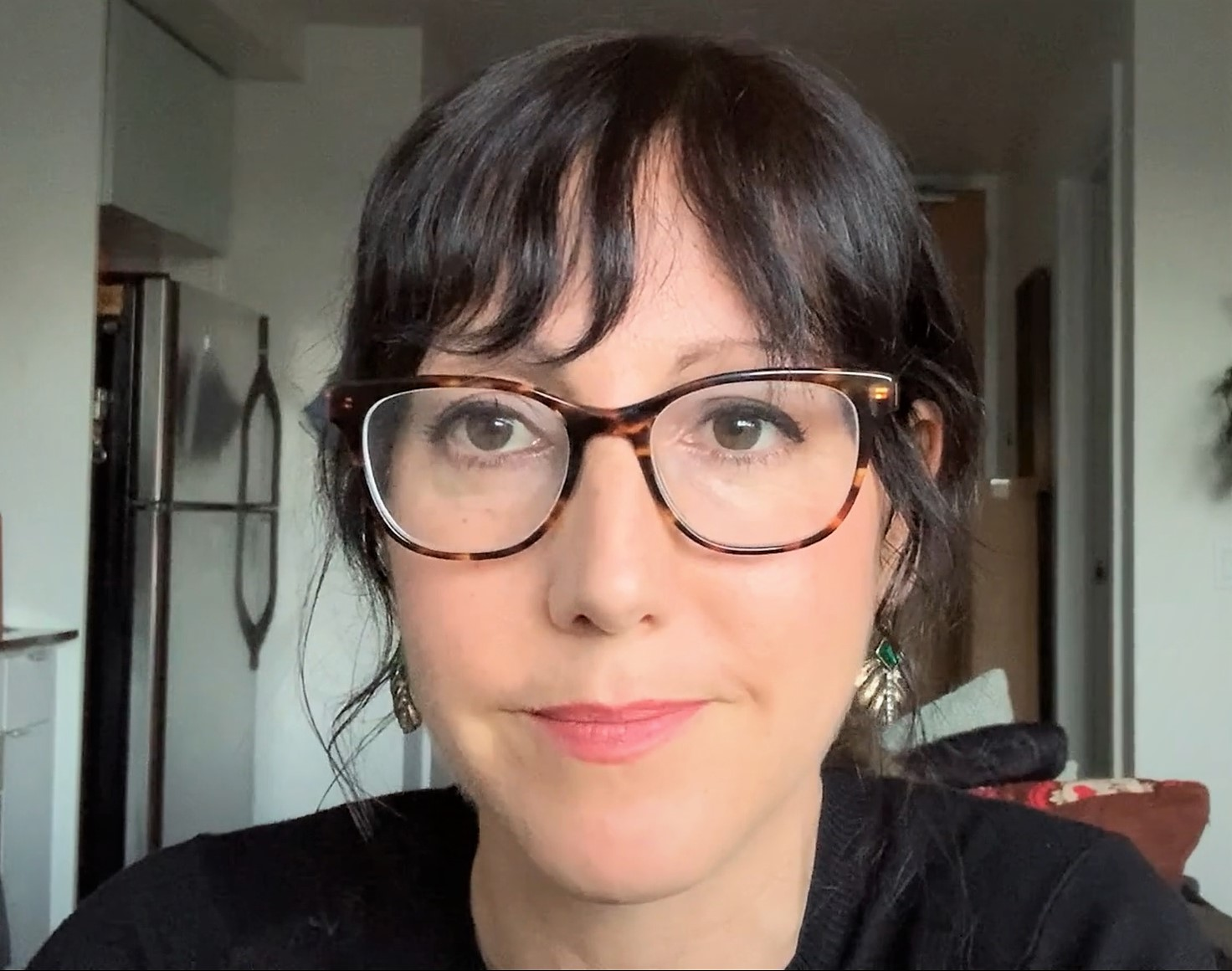
- Maxmen speaks about the One World Media nomination of her work, "The next chapter for African genomics", in 2021
- Born: 1978 (age 47–48)

Academic background
- Education: Harvard University
- Thesis: Pycnogonid development and the evolution of the arthropod body plan (2006)
- Website: Amy Maxmen

Amy Maxmen (born 1978) is an American science journalist who writes about evolution, medicine, science policy and scientists. She was awarded the Victor Cohn Prize for Excellence in Medical Science Reporting for her coverage of the COVID-19 pandemic, and other awards for her reporting on Ebola and malaria.

== Early life and education ==
Maxmen was an undergraduate student at the University of California, Berkeley, where she majored in biology and English. She moved to the East Coast of the United States for graduate studies, where she received a Ph.D. in evolutionary biology from Harvard University. Her doctoral research, published in the journal Nature, suggested that sea spiders belong to an early lineage of arthropods and that their claws may be similar to the 'great appendages' seen in fossils dating back to the Cambrian explosion.

== Research and career ==
Maxmen is a popular science journalist. She has been a reporter at Science News and Nature and an editor at Nautilus Quarterly. Her articles have also appeared in publications including the New York Times and National Geographic. She writes about issues related to evolutionary biology, health technology, science policy and medicine. In 2015, Maxmen wrote about the origins of humanity. The article, which featured in Nautilus Quarterly, was part of "The Best American Science and Nature Writing" in 2015. During Ebola virus epidemics, Maxmen reported from Sierra Leone and the Democratic Republic of the Congo.

Maxmen was part of the 2020 cohort of the Knight Science Journalism fellows at the Massachusetts Institute of Technology and a 2022-2023 press fellow at the Council on Foreign Relations. Maxmen has been regularly featured on the Nature podcast, the CoronaPod.

== Awards and honors ==
- 2016 Science in Society Journalism Award for her National Geographic article on how Ebola tested traditions
- 2016 Bricker Award for Science Writing in Medicine
- 2018 First place in public health from the Association of Health Care Journalists Awards for Excellence in Health Care Journalism for her Nature feature on the spread of drug-resistant malaria in southeast Asia
- 2019 AAAS Kavli Science Journalism Award, Magazine Gold; First place award for excellence in the trade category from the Association of Health Care Journalists; and the 2020 Communications Award from the American Society of Tropical Medicine & Hygiene for her Nature feature on how the World Health Organization battled Ebola in northeastern Democratic Republic of the Congo
- 2021 Victor Cohn Prize for Excellence in Medical Science Reporting, shared with Helen Branswell
- 2022 Feature of the Year, specialist category, from the Medical Journalists' Association; 2022 Honorable mention from the NIHCM Foundation Awards in trade journalism; and 2021 Communications Award from the American Society of Tropical Medicine & Hygiene for her Nature feature on the toll of inequality in the Covid pandemic among agriculture workers in the United States.

== Selected publications ==
=== Scientific research ===
- Amy Maxmen; Browne, William; Martindale, Mark; Giribet, Gonzalo (2005). "Neuroanatomy of sea spiders implies an appendicular origin of the protocerebral segment". Nature. 437 (7062): 1144–1148. doi:10.1038/nature03984. PMID 16237442. Wikidata Q34461278.

=== Science writing ===
- Amy Maxmen (2011). "Nutrition advice: the vitamin D-lemma". Nature. 475 (7354): 23–25. doi:10.1038/475023a. PMID 21734684. Wikidata Q51550446.
- Maxmen, Amy (January 2015). "How the Fight Against Ebola Tested a Culture's Traditions". National Geographic. Pete Muller (photogr.). Archived from the original on March 8, 2021.
- Ball, Philip; Amy Maxmen (2020). "The epic battle against coronavirus misinformation and conspiracy theories". Nature. 581 (7809): 371–374. doi:10.1038/d41586-020-01452-z. PMID 32461658. Wikidata Q95933952.
