= Ed Yong =

British science journalist (born 1981)

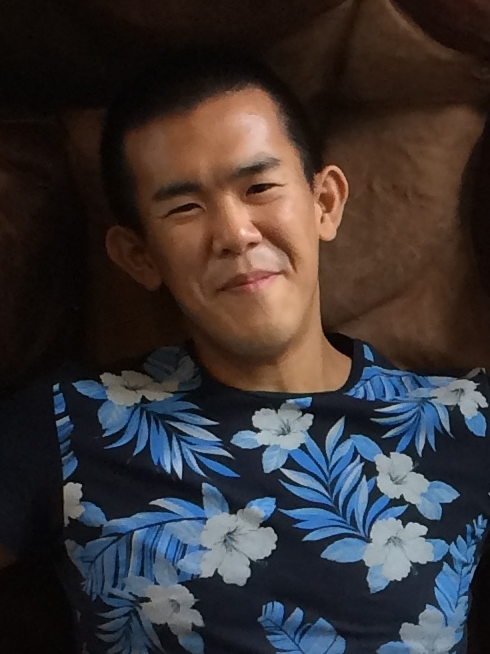
- Yong in 2015
- Born: Edmund Soon-Weng Yong; 17 December 1981 (age 44); Malaysia
- Education: Pembroke College, Cambridge (BA); University College London (MPhil)
- Known for: Not Exactly Rocket Science (blog); I Contain Multitudes: The Microbes Within Us and a Grander View of Life (book); An Immense World: How Animal Senses Reveal the Hidden Realms Around Us (book)
- Spouse: Liz Neeley
- Awards: Pulitzer Prize for Explanatory Reporting
- Scientific career
- Workplaces: The Atlantic
- Thesis: Searching for the human resolvase (2005)
- Website: edyong.me

Edmund Soon-Weng Yong (born 17 December 1981) is a British-American science journalist and author. In 2021, he received a Pulitzer Prize for Explanatory Reporting for a series on the COVID-19 pandemic.

He is the author of two books: I Contain Multitudes: The Microbes Within Us and a Grander View of Life (2016); and An Immense World: How Animal Senses Reveal the Hidden Realms Around Us (2022).

== Education ==
Ed Yong was born on 17 December 1981, in Malaysia. At the age of 13, Yong immigrated to the UK in 1994. He became a British citizen in 2005.

Yong was awarded a Bachelor of Arts (promoted per tradition to a Master of Arts) in natural sciences (zoology) from Pembroke College, Cambridge in 2002. He completed postgraduate study at University College London (UCL), where he was awarded a Master of Philosophy (MPhil) degree in 2005 in biochemistry.

== Career ==
Yong's approach to popular science writing has been described as "the future of science news", and he has received numerous awards for his work. Earlier in his career, Yong created and wrote the now-defunct blog Not Exactly Rocket Science, which was published as part of the National Geographic Phenomena blog network. Yong received the National Academies Communication Award from the National Academy of Sciences in 2010 in recognition of his online journalism; in the same year, he received three awards from ResearchBlogging.org, which supports online science journalism focused on covering research that has already been published in peer-reviewed scientific journals that can be adapted for a wider public audience. In 2012 he received the National Union of Journalists (NUJ) Stephen White Award. His blog received the first Best Science Blog award from the Association of British Science Writers in 2014. Yong's interactions with other science bloggers and engagement with those who have commented on his blog have served as case studies for academic work in media studies.

His work also has been published by Nature, Scientific American, the BBC, Slate, Aeon, The Guardian, The Times, New Scientist, Wired, The New York Times, and The New Yorker.

In September 2015, Yong joined The Atlantic as a science reporter. In August 2020, he received the Council for the Advancement of Science Writing's Victor Cohn Prize for Excellence in Medical Science Reporting, citing his reporting on the COVID-19 pandemic and his commitment to including marginalized and underrepresented voices in his writing. In June 2021, he received a Pulitzer Prize for Explanatory Reporting for a series on the COVID-19 pandemic. Yong left The Atlantic in 2023. In 2024, he criticized the publication for its hiring of Jonathan Chait, as well as its coverage of transgender rights.

In 2016, Yong released the book, I Contain Multitudes: The Microbes Within Us and a Grander View of Life which recounts the ubiquitousness of microbes and the relationships microbes have with animals. In 2022, Yong released his second book, An Immense World: How Animal Senses Reveal the Hidden Realms Around Us, which explores animal perception. The book received the Andrew Carnegie Medal for Excellence in Nonfiction, was featured as Book of the Week on BBC Radio 4 in June 2022, named by Publishers Weekly as one of the top ten books of 2022, regardless of genre, and awarded the 2023 Royal Society Trivedi Science Book Prize.

== Personal life ==
Yong is married to Liz Neeley, a science communicator. They occasionally collaborate on speaking engagements.

Yong lived in Washington, D.C. until May 2023, when he and Neeley moved to Oakland, California, where they currently reside.

== Bibliography ==
- Not Exactly Rocket Science. Lulu Press. 2008.
- I Contain Multitudes: The Microbes Within Us and a Grander View of Life. Random House. 2016.
- An Immense World: How Animal Senses Reveal the Hidden Realms Around Us. Random House. 2022.
