= Genome News Network =

Online genomics magazine

The Genome News Network (abbreviated GNN) is an online magazine that publishes news articles and educational resources about genomics and medicine. It was founded in 1999, with Barbara Culliton as the founding editor-in-chief. It was originally published by Celera Genomics. In 2001, the Institute for Genomic Research became the magazine's new publisher, which merged in 2006 to form the J. Craig Venter Institute. An article published in the Lancet Oncology that year stated that the magazine "...offers news, original articles, the online reference book, What’s a genome?, and primers on sequencing and assembling the genome – all well written and illustrated". As of 2010, new issues of the magazine were published biweekly.
