= Medical journalism =

Reporting of medical news

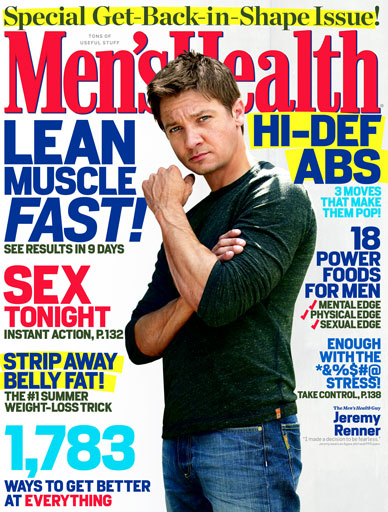
Men's Health magazine, published by Rodale Press

Medical journalism is news reporting (as opposed to peer-review publication) of medical news and features. Medical journalism is diverse and reflects its audience. The main division is into (1) medical journalism for the general public, which includes medical coverage in general news publications and in specialty medical publications, and (2) medical journalism for doctors and other professionals, which often appears in peer-reviewed journals.

The accuracy of medical journalism varies widely. Reviews of mass media publications have graded most stories unsatisfactory, although there were examples of excellence. Other reviews have found that most errors in mass media publications were the result of repeating errors in the original journal articles or their press releases. Some websites, such as Columbia Journalism Review and Hippocrates Med Review, publish and review medical journalism.

== Sources ==
Medical journalism can come from a variety of sources, including:

- Television news programs
- Newspapers
- Internet websites
- Scientific journals (those that report health- and medical-related news)

== Accuracy ==
Most inaccuracies and speculations in news coverage can be attributed to several barriers between the scientific community and the general public that include lack of knowledge by reporters, lack of time to prepare a proper report, and lack of space in the publication. Most news articles fail to discuss important issues such as evidence quality, costs, and risks versus benefits.

However, medical journalism is not only what is being commercialized and covered by news and mass media. There is also another extensive, more academic branch of medical journalism which is based on evidence. Evidence-based research is more accurate and thus it is a much more reliable source than medical news disseminated by tabloids. Medical journalism in this regard is a professional field and is often disregarded. There are also some medical journalism institutions that provide assistance to medical researchers to enable them to perform more reliable studies. A 2009 study found small improvements in some areas of medical reporting in Australia, but the overall quality remained poor, particularly in commercial human-interest television programs.

More recently, the use of medical writers has become more popular as a way to produce medical literature that is clear, concise, and easier to read by the lay person.

The International Committee of Medical Journal Editors (ICMJE) is a committee that specifically deals with this kind of issue; the organization is committed to keeping medical reporting as accurate as possible by setting a standard known as the Uniform Requirements for Manuscripts Submitted to Biomedical Journals (URMs). These requirements do not only specify technical points such as bibliographical references and copyrights, but also regarding ethical issues that may arise. For example, a submitter must disclose any personal or professional relationships that might even slightly have a bearing on the submitted work.

To this end, it is not uncommon for researchers to hold a press conference or interviews before publishing significant research to prevent misconstruing of any data or methods.

== Conflict of interest ==
=== Between scientists and journalists ===
A large gap divides the scientific and journalist communities when it comes to deciding what is newsworthy. The ongoing nature of peer review in the scientific community makes it difficult to report interesting advances in scientific discovery. Consequently, this can create a focus on the negative aspects of medicine and science, which causes journalists to report on the mistakes of doctors or misconstrue the results of research. However, journalists are not the only ones at fault, as scientists sometimes also broadcast initial research to the media in attempts to secure future funding. For example, research done by George Washington University in 1993 on in-vitro fertilization was warped by the media into a horrific foray into human cloning.

=== Corporate influence ===
Medical journalists also face challenges due to potential conflicts of interest. The pharmaceutical industry has sponsored journalism contests that carry large prizes in cash or in overseas trips. The Association of Health Care Journalists (AHCJ) urges journalists to consider these contests carefully before entering, and most journalists avoid them. The Center for Excellence in Health Care Journalism, the supporting 501(c)(3) for AHCJ, does not accept industry funding. The National Association of Science Writers does not accept such funding. The changing nature of news media has caused more reporters to work freelance, outside of traditional news organizations such as major metropolitan newspapers, which may have created more ways to sidestep conflict-of-interest standards, and the rise of blogs has allowed nontraditional providers of news that lack these standards entirely.

There is also the effect of direct corporate investments in research funding. While the funding is appreciated by scientists, it can sometimes cause conflicts with journalists who see this as profiteering.

== Reviews ==
Sources for evaluating health care media coverage include the review websites Behind the Headlines, Health News Review, and Media Doctor (see External links), along with specialized academic journals such as the Journal of Health Communication. Reviews can also appear in the American Journal of Public Health, the Columbia Journalism Review, Ben Goldacre's "Bad Science" column in The Guardian, and others. Health News Review has published criteria for rating news stories. Reviews vary widely in type, with systematic reviews more likely to be published in academic publications.

== Effects on the general public ==
Although medical news articles often deliver public health messages effectively, they often convey inaccurate or misleading information about healthcare, partly when reporters do not know or cannot convey the results of clinical studies, and partly when they fail to supply reasonable context. This can result in unrealistic expectations due to coverage of radical medical procedures and experimental technology. Mass media news outlets can also create a "communications storm" to shift attention to a single health issue. The lack of health knowledge in the general public creates a situation where a person can be easily swayed to a certain point of view that is cast in the manner in which information is reported. Consequently, this can create a potentially unhealthy focus on an illness that in actuality is relatively rare.

Medical journalism can also influence an individual's quality of healthcare. Due to the relative ease at which information can be obtained on the internet, many people will now question doctors on new medications and treatments for their conditions. In more extreme cases, people will compare their perception of their symptoms to various illnesses in attempts to diagnose themselves.

There have been a few recent studies that have tried to explore the availability of health information as complement to healthcare or as a substitute, yet no direct relationships have been found. This is most likely caused by a lack of knowledge or a lack of the ability in the individual to apply the health information once found resulting in seeking healthcare.

== Training ==
Only a handful of universities and institutes globally offer undergraduate, postgraduate, or diploma level programs related to medical journalism. Boston University via its College of Communication conducts a Science and Medical Journalism program leading to a Master of Science degree.

== See also ==
- Medical writing
- Science by press conference
- Science communication
- Social determinants of health
