= Council for the Advancement of Science Writing =

NGO supporting science writing

- Abbreviation: CASW
- Formation: 1960
- Type: NGO
- Tax ID no.: EIN 13-1953314
- Legal status: 501(c)3 foundation
- President: Alan Boyle

The Council for the Advancement of Science Writing (CASW) is a global non-profit foundation supporting scientists and journalists. It develops and funds programs to improve writing about science, technology, medicine, and the environment.

== History ==
Incorporated in 1960 as a tax-exempt, 501(c)(3) educational organization, CASW held its first meeting in January 1960. Limited to 25 members, the Council funds projects to educate science writers.

== Programs ==
CASW provides educational programs and funds awards to raise the quality of science writing.

=== New Horizons in Science ===
New Horizons in Science is a program of educational briefings on emerging scientific research and issues and science story ideas.

=== Graduate School Fellowships ===
CASW's Taylor/Blakeslee Fellowship Program supports at least four fellowships for graduate students in science writing.

The William L. Laurence Scholarship Fund in Science Writing honored a retired New York Times science writer. The Times also reported, "A separate $99,640 grant was awarded to the Council for the Advancement of Science Writing, Inc., to train reporters for black, Spanish‐language, American Indian and Asian‐American newspapers, magazines and broadcast stations during the next year."

=== Victor Cohn Prize for Excellence in Medical Science Reporting ===
Cohn was a founder of the Council for the Advancement of Science Writing. The Victor Cohn Prize was established in 2000. It is given to honor a writer for work that, "has made a profound and lasting contribution to public awareness and understanding of critical advances in medical science and their impact on human health and well-being".

=== CASW Showcase ===
The CASW showcase is website that shares and critiques award-winning science stories.

=== Evert Clark/Seth Payne Award for a Young Science Journalist ===
This award is given to young science writers to recognize "outstanding reporting and writing in any field of science."

== Awards, recognition ==
In 2003 the National Science Board honored CASW with a Public Service Award "for its achievement in bringing together scientists and science writers for the purpose of improving the quality of science news reaching the public."

== See also ==
- Patrusky Lecture
- National Association of Science Writers
- Science Writing Award
