= Bogoslovskoe Cemetery =

Cemetery in Saint Petersburg

- Богословское кладбище
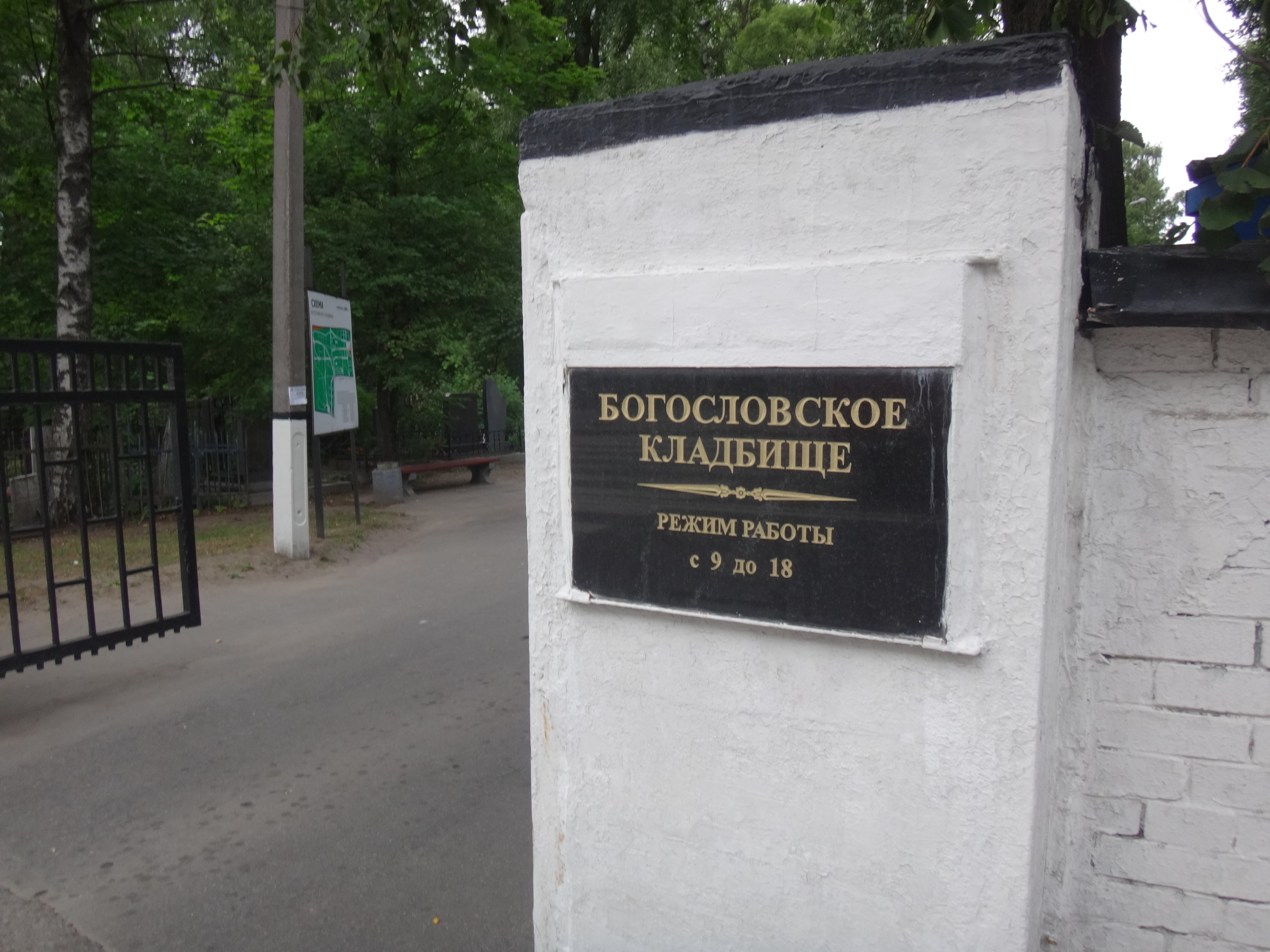
- Entrance gates to the Bogoslovskoe Cemetery
- Interactive map of Bogoslovskoe Cemetery

Details
- Established: 18th century
- Location: Saint Petersburg
- Country: Russia
- Coordinates: 59°59′26.16″N 30°23′40.92″E
- Size: 0.4 square kilometres (99 acres)

Bogoslovskoe Cemetery (Russian: Богословское кладбище) is a cemetery in Saint Petersburg, Russia. It is located in the Kalininsky District of the city between Laboratornaya Street and Prospekt Mechnikov.

The name comes from the church of John the Apostle, (Russian: Иоанн Богослов, Ioann Bogoslov), which from the early 18th century had a burial ground attached, mostly for those who died in the nearby military hospital. This site was some 2.5 km south of the present cemetery, at what is now the intersection of Arsenalnaya Street and Mineralnaya Streets. The church and cemetery were closed in 1788 and the land sold off into private ownership. In 1841 the city acquired a new plot of land for a cemetery, and named it after the previous one. In 1844, the Most Holy Synod approved the building of a new stone church, but no funds were available. In 1853-1854 a small two-storey chapel was built.

In 1915–1916, a new wooden three-fronted church of John the Apostle was built at the cemetery to the design of architect Viktor Bobrov. The church was closed during the Soviet era, and finally looted and demolished in 1938, along with part of the cemetery, as it lay within an area closed off for military purposes. In Soviet times the cemetery became the burial place of many prominent scientists, cultural figures, and military officials. It was also the site of several mass graves of those who died during the siege of Leningrad. These are found in the northern part of the cemetery, marked by a hill topped with a small obelisk. In October 2000, a newly rebuilt wooden church of John the Apostle was consecrated.

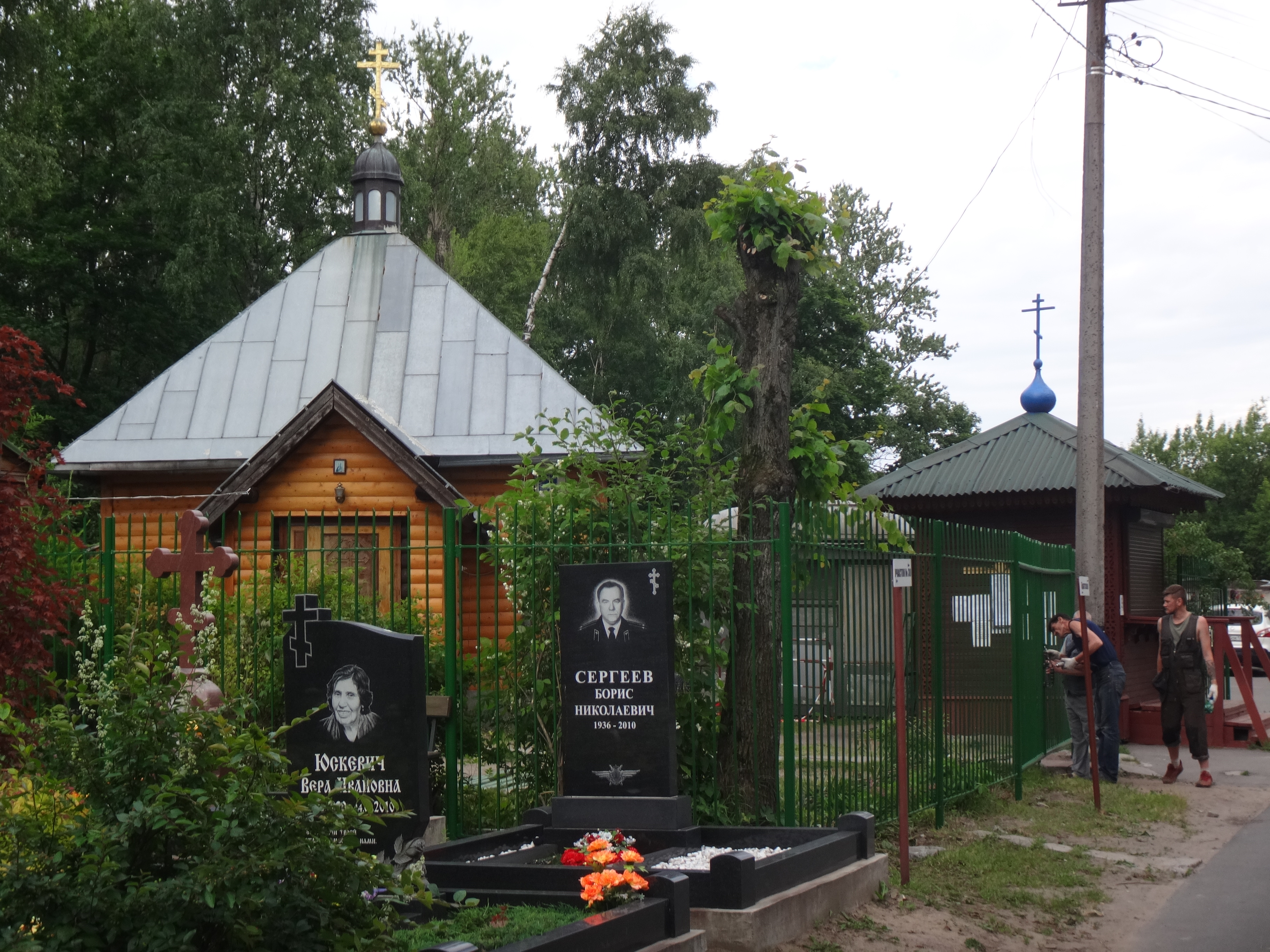
Church of John the Apostle in the cemetery

== Interments ==
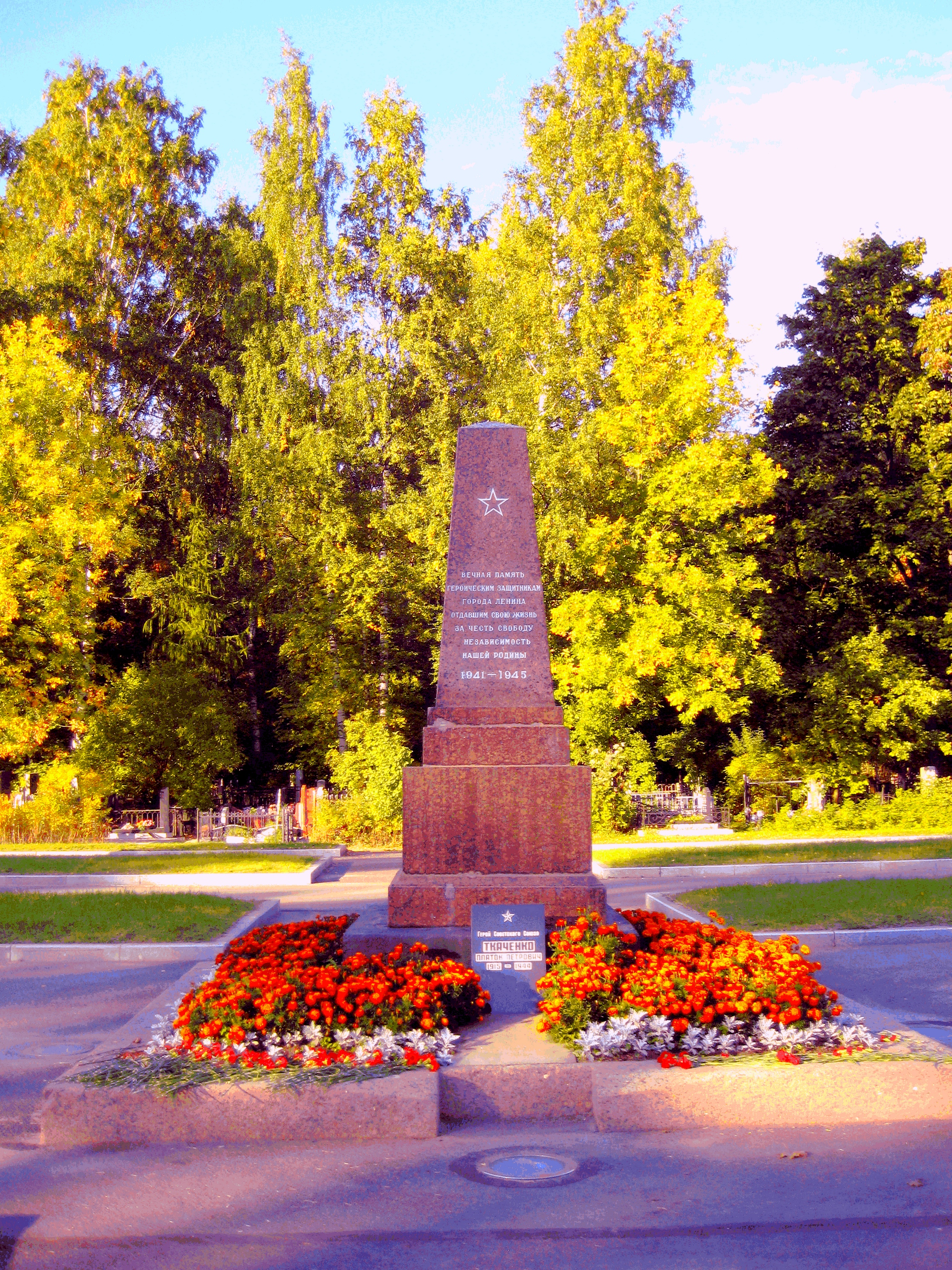
Memorial obelisk to Soviet soldiers killed in the Second World War

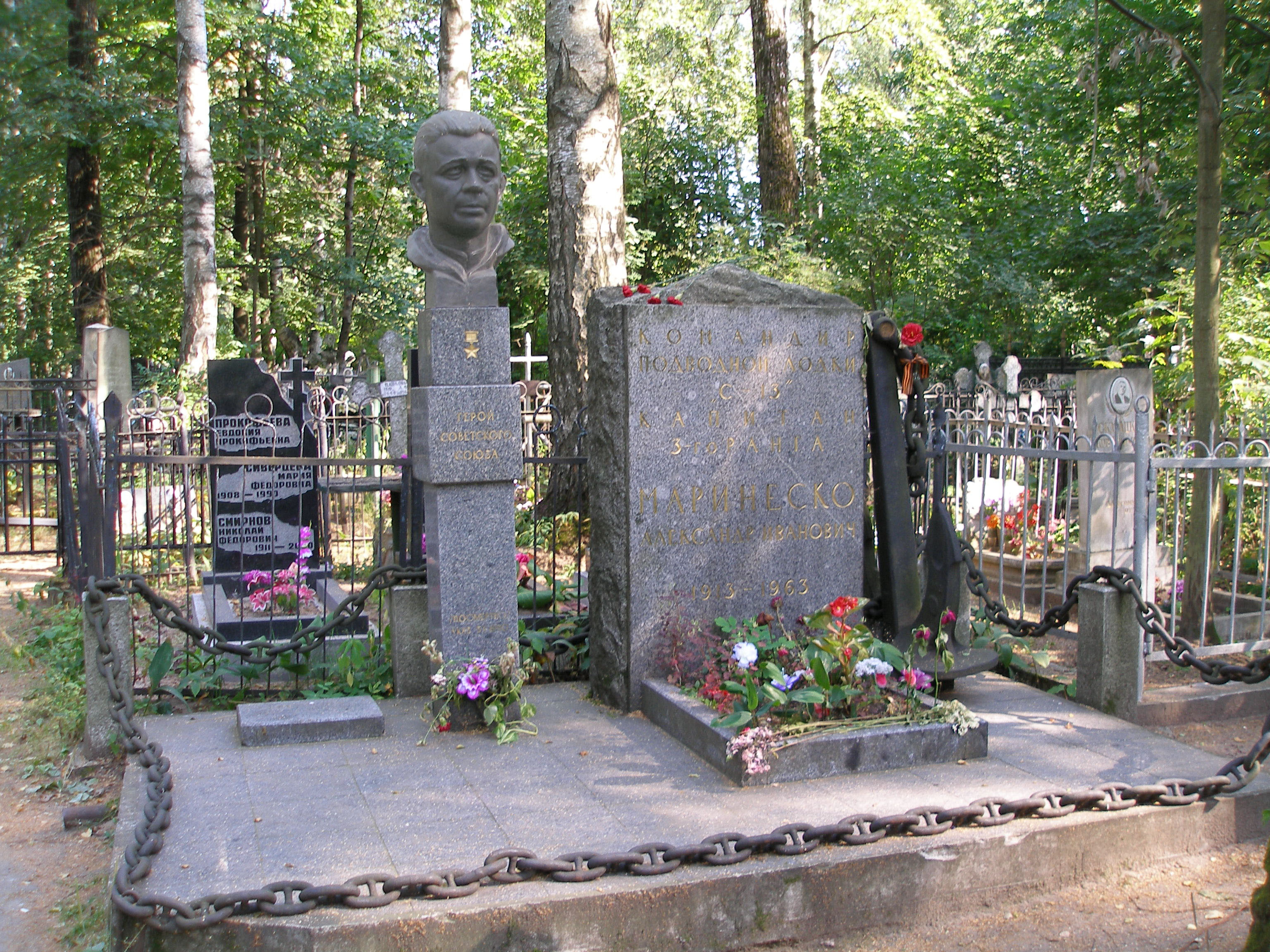
Grave of submariner Alexander Marinesko

- Aleksandr Aleksandrov (1912–1999), mathematician, physicist and philosopher
- Nikolay Anichkov (1885–1964), pathologist, Anitschkow cells
- Aleksandr Babaev (1923–1985), fighter pilot
- Yevgeni Belosheikin (1966–1999), hockey player
- Vitaly Bianki (1894–1959), children's and nature writer
- Mikhail Bonch-Bruevich (1888–1940), engineer, scientist, and professor
- Piotr Buchkin (1886–1965), painter, illustrator, and art teacher
- Boris Bychowsky (1908–1974), parasitologist
- Yevgeny Charushin (1901–1965), illustrator and author of children's literature
- Aleksandr Chernyshyov (1882–1940), electrical engineer
- Viktor Chistiakov (1943–1972), actor
- Igor M. Diakonoff (1915–1999), historian, linguist, and translator
- Ivan Dzerzhinsky (1909–1978), composer
- Boris Eikhenbaum (1886–1959), literary scholar and historian
- Fridrikh Ermler (1898–1967), film director, actor, and screenwriter
- Olga Freidenberg (1890–1955), philologist
- Valerian Frolov (1895–1961), military officer
- Andrey Gagarin (1934–2011), physicist
- Vladimir Gardin (1877–1965), film director and actor
- Aleksei German (1938–2013), director and screenwriter
- Yuri German (1910–1967), writer, playwright, screenwriter, and journalist
- Mikhail Gorsheniov (1973–2013), singer and composer, Korol i Shut
- Vladimir Govyrin (1924–1994), physiologist
- Edouard Grikurov (1907–1982), conductor
- Ivan Ivanov (1862–1939), mathematician
- Sergei Izotov (1917–1983), scientist and aircraft designer
- Gennadi Kazansky (1910–1983), film director
- Lidia Klement (1937–1964), singer
- Mikhail Kovalyov (1897–1967), military officer
- Vladimir Konashevich (1888–1963), graphic artist and illustrator
- Boris Konstantinov (1910–1969), physicist
- Boris Korneev (1922–1973), painter and art teacher
- Nikolai Korotkov (1874–1920), surgeon, pioneer of vascular surgery
- Nikolai Kulakov (1908–1976), naval officer
- Ivan Ladyga (1920–2010), military officer
- Kirill Lavrov (1925–2007), film and theatre actor and director
- Vladimir Lebedev (1891–1967), painter
- Vladimir Lemeshev (1911–1976), football player and coach
- Nikolay Lunin (1907–1970), naval officer
- Anatoly Marienhof (1897–1962), poet, novelist and playwright
- Alexander Marinesko (1913–1963), naval officer
- Ivan Meshcherskiy (1859–1935), mathematician
- Yevgeny Mravinsky (1903–1988), conductor
- Dmitry Nelyubin, (1971–2005), track cyclist
- Vladimir Myasishchev (1893–1973), psychologist and developmental psychologist
- Joseph Orbeli (1887–1961), orientalist, academician
- Leon Orbeli (1882–1958), physiologist
- Maria Orbeli (1916–1949), physicist
- Yevgeny Pavlovsky (1884–1965), zoologist, entomologist
- Alexei Pakhomov (1900–1973), avant garde painter
- Alexander Prokofyev (1900–1971), poet
- Alexander "Ricochet" Aksyonov (1964–2007), singer-songwriter
- Zoya Rozhdestvenskaya (1906–1953), singer
- Vasily Shorin (1871–1938), military officer
- Terentii Shtykov (1907–1964), military officer
- Yelena Shushunova (1969–2018), gymnast
- Evgeny Schwartz (1896–1958), writer and playwright
- Nikolai Simoniak (1901–1956), military officer
- Alexander Sokolov (1918–1973), painter and art teacher
- Nikolay Solovyov (1931–2007), wrestler
- Nikolai Suetin (1897–1954), artist
- Vasily Tolstikov (1917–2003), diplomat and Communist Party official
- Alexander Tolush (1910–1969), chess grandmaster
- Vladimir Trusenyov (1931–2001), discus thrower
- Viktor Tsoi (1962–1990), singer and songwriter, Kino
- Lev Uspensky (1900–1978), writer and philologist
- Eduard Vinokurov (1942–2010), Olympic sabre fencer
- Leonid Yakobson (1904–1975), ballet choreographer
- Mikhail Zalessky (1877–1946), paleontologist and paleobotanist
- Isaak Zaltsman (1905–1988), Known as "King of Tanks" while manager of Chelyabinsk Tractor Plant and Kirov Plant.
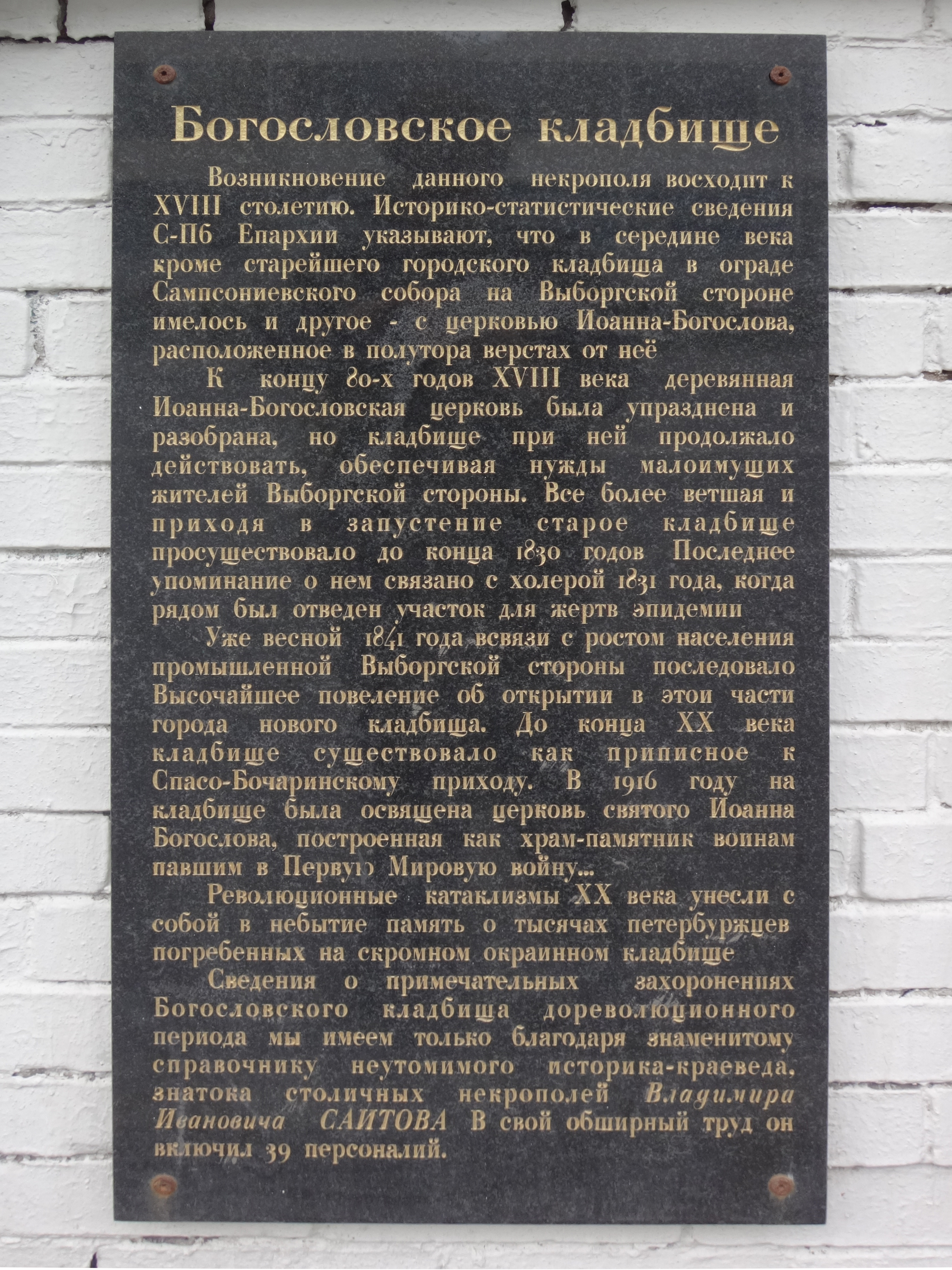
  Basic information about the Theological Cemetery

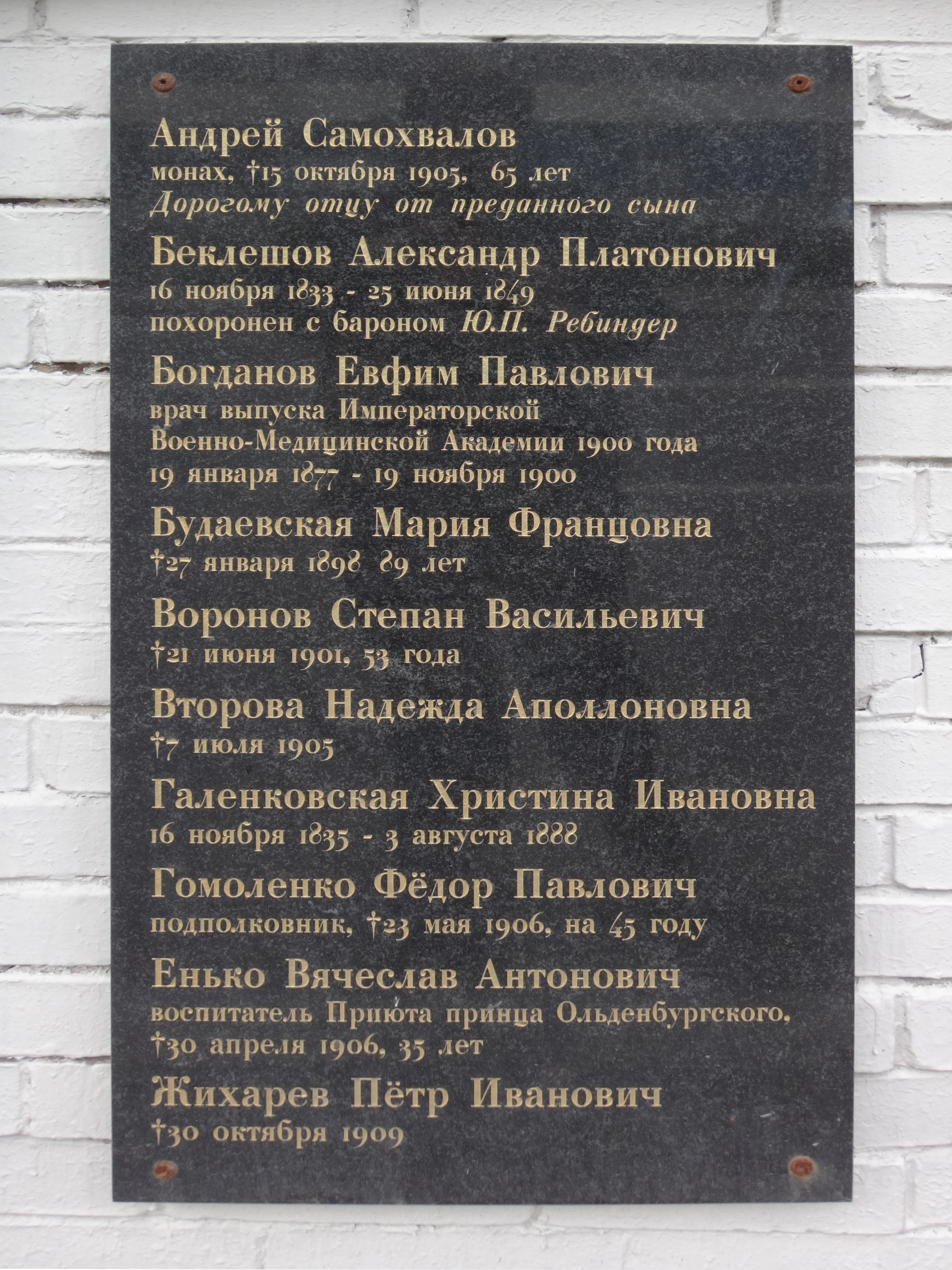
Notable pre-revolutionary burials; compiled by Vladimir Ivanovich Saitov

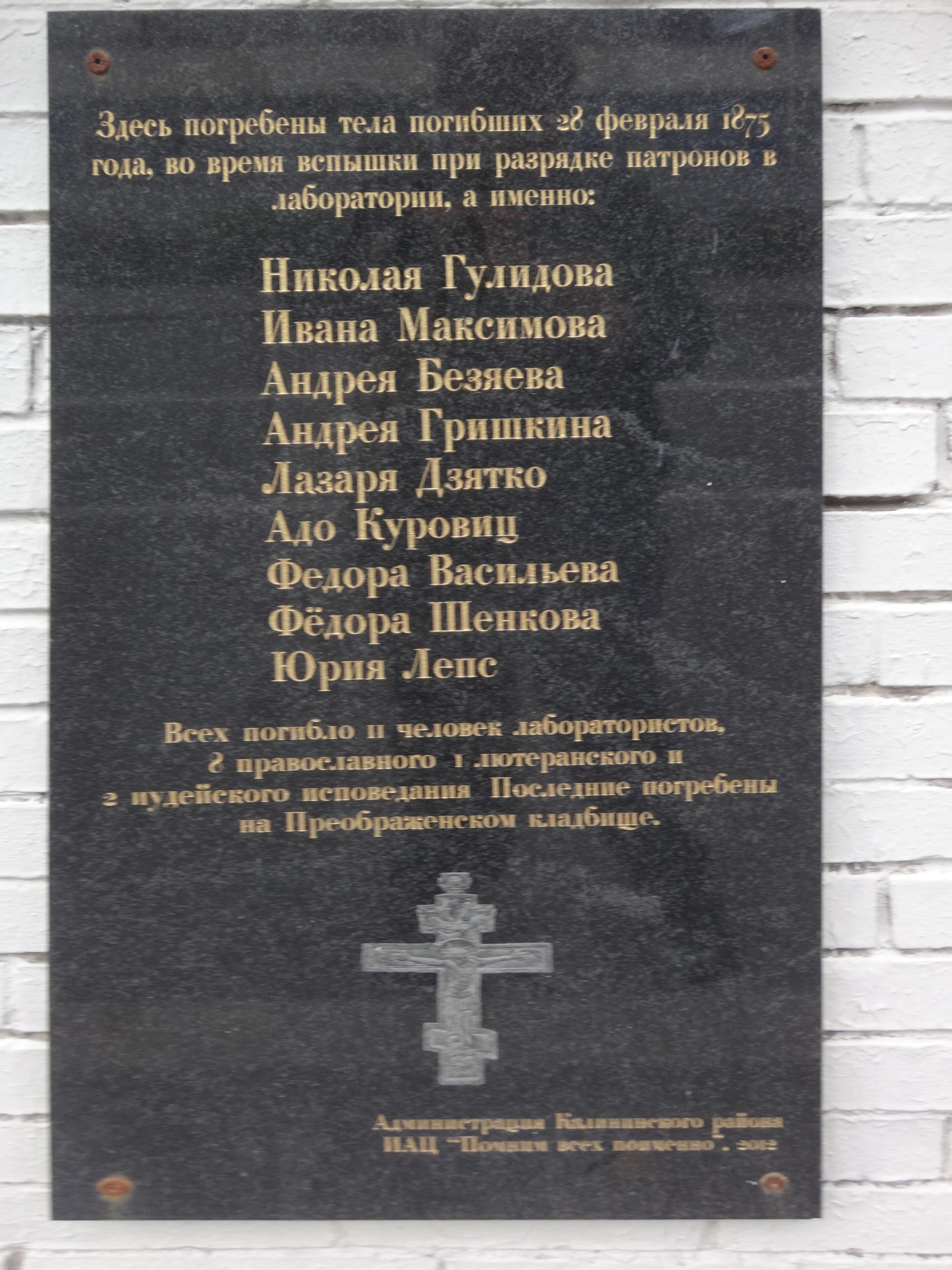
List of those killed on February 28, 1875, during an explosion in an artillery laboratory
