= Orbeli =

Orbeli generally refers to:

- House of Orbeli, the powerful family in the 12th and 13th century Georgia
- Orbeli family, is an Armenian family
- House of Orbeliani, Georgian noble family (tavadi)
- Orbelian Dynasty, a medieval Armenian noble family and lords of the province of Syunik
- Joseph Orbeli, an Armenian orientalist
- Leon Orbeli, an Armenian physiologist

== See also ==
- Liparitids, a medieval Georgian noble family
