= Yervand Margaryan =

Armenian historian

- Երվանդ Մարգարյան
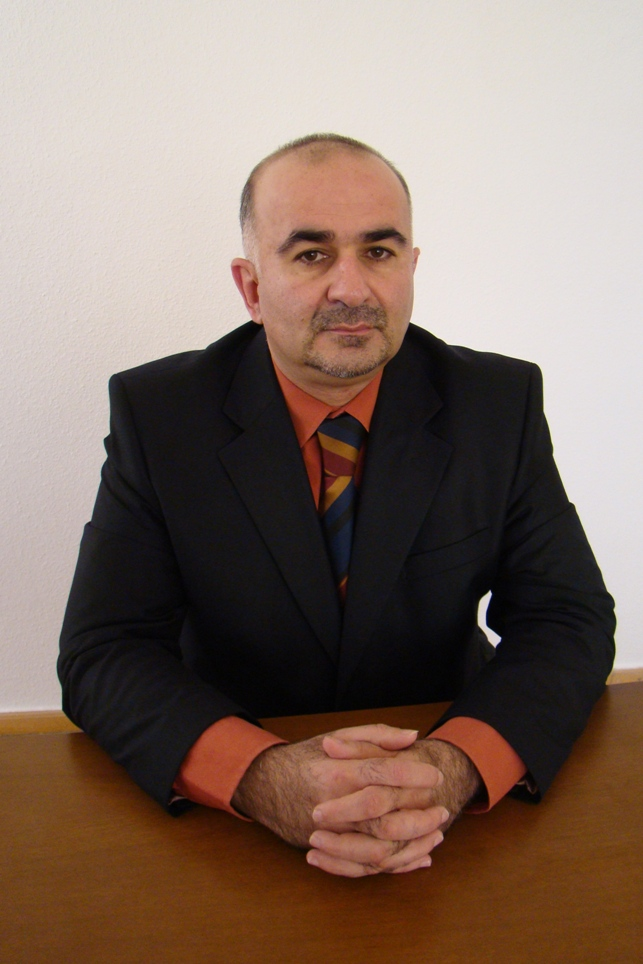
- Born: November 19, 1961 (age 64); Tashkent
- Citizenship: Armenia
- Education: Yerevan Brusov State University of Languages and Social Sciences
- Scientific career
- Fields: World History, Oriental History, Ancient and Medieval History
- Workplaces: Russian-Armenian (Slavonic) University, Institute of History of Armenian National Academy of Sciences
- Thesis: Hellenistic sanctuaries of Commagene and Armenia (1992)
- Website: ervandmargaryan.com/english/

Yervand Margaryan (Armenian: Երվանդ Մարգարյան, born 19 September 1961) is an Armenian historian and doctor of historical sciences. He is the Professor, Head of the Department of World History and Foreign Regional Studies in Russian-Armenian (Slavonic) University, and Leading Researcher of Institute of History of Armenian National Academy of Sciences.

== Biography ==
Born in Tashkent in an Armenian family, he moved with his family to Armenia in 1966. In 1983 he graduated Department of English language and history of Yerevan Brusov State University of Languages and Social Sciences. In 1987 he joined the Institute of History of Academy of Sciences of Armenian SSR as post-graduate. In the same year he started working at the same Institute. In 1992 defended thesis "Hellenistic sanctuaries of Commagene and Armenia". Since 1994 senior fellow at the Institute of History of the National Academy of Sciences. Since 1996 - Professor of the chair of world history in Yerevan State University. In 2005 received the rank of assistant professor. Since 2015 - Doctor of History and Council Member of The Historians Association of Armenia. Participated in numerous international and national conferences. Scope of scientific interests include the history of Ancient World and Middle Ages.

== Publications ==
=== Books ===
- Маргарян Е. Г. Аршакаванская эллинистическая политея и Град Небесный Нерсеса Великого. Archived 2010-12-19 at the Wayback Machine Издательство РАУ, 2007 (ISBN 978-99941-63-41-0)
- Ե. Մարգարյան (2014). Միհրականությունը հին աշխարհի քաղաքական և կրոնահոգևոր համակարգում. Կոմմագենե, Ծոփք, Հայաստան, Հռոմ (PDF). Երևան: Պատմության ինստիտուտ. p. 277. Archived from the original (PDF) on 2019-02-14.

=== Articles ===
- Ե. Մարգարյան, Սամոսատի եկեղեցի // Քրիստոնյա Հայաստան, Հանրագիտարան, Երևան, 2001
- Ե. Մարգարյան, Ալեքսանդրիայի եկեղեցի // Քրիստոնյա Հայաստան, Հանրագիտարան, Երևան, 2001
- Ե. Մարգարյան, Ադիաբենեի եկեղեցի // Քրիստոնյա Հայաստան, Հանրագիտարան, Երևան, 2001
- Ե. Մարգարյան, Անտիոքի եկեղեցի // Քրիստոնյա Հայաստան, Հանրագիտարան, Երևան, 2001
- Ե. Մարգարյան, Ագապներ // Քրիստոնյա Հայաստան, Հանրագիտարան, Երևան, 2001
- Ե. Մարգարյան, Դրվագներ հին Հայաստսնի հոգևոր մշակույթի պատմությունից // ՀՀ ԳԱԱ Գիտությունե հրատարակչություն, Երևան, 2001, 122 էջ (ISBN 580800005X (5-8080-0005-X))
- Ե. Մարգարյան, Նժդեհի արքետիպը «Ագաթանգեղայ պատմութեան հայոց» մեջ Archived 2016-09-24 at the Wayback Machine // Վենետիկ, Բազմավեպ, 2004, № 1-4
- Ե. Մարգարյան, «Փառքի» գաղափարը հին հայոց աշխարհա-հայեցակարգում //Գիտություն և տեխնիկա, 2005, № 10
- Ե. Մարգարյան, «Մենավոր հրաշամանուկի» առասպելաբանական պայմանաձևը որպես հայ ավանդական և պատմագիտական ընկալումների կենտրոնական գաղափար // Գիտություն և տեխնիկա, 2005 № 11
- Ե. Մարգարյան, Մեծ Հայքի և Կոմմագենեի հոգևոր առնչությունների պատմությունից (արքայական հանգստարան - oJ temevnos) // Պատմություն և կրթություն, 2005, № 3-4
- Ե. Մարգարյան, Ժամանակի կառույցը Ֆերնան Բրոդելի պատմահայեցողության ծիրում Ա. Ստեփանյանի համահեղինակությամբ // Պատմություն և կրթություն, 2006, № 1-2
- Ե. Մարգարյան, Կոմմագենեն և Ծոփքը հելլենիստական դարաշրջանում // Հայոց պատմություն, Ա հատոր, Էրևվան, ՀՀ ԳԱԱ հրատ., 2006
- Ե. Մարգարյան, Գ. Վարդումյան, Կրոնների պատմություն Ուսումնական ձեռնարկ Պրակ Ա Հին կրոններ // Երևան, «Լինգվաե», 2006 (ISBN 99930-79-35-9)
- Ե. Մարգարյան, Հայ-կոմմագենյան հոգևոր-մշակութային աղերսները // Հայոց պատմություն, Ա հատոր, Էրևվան, ՀՀ ԳԱԱ հրատ., 2006
- Ե. Մարգարյան, Տիգրան Բ-ի աշխարհակալ տերության գաղափարաμանական հայեցակարգի հիմքերի մասին // Հայոց պատմության հարցեր, 8։ Երևան, ՀԱԳԱ պատմության ինստ. հրատարակչ., 2007, էջ 3-15
- Ե. Մարգարյան, «Իդեալական պետական կազմակերպման փնտրտուքները հելլենիստական Հայաստանում» Ազգային գաղափար // Երևան, ապրիլ, 2008. է. 64-75 Archived 2021-06-13 at the Wayback Machine
- Ե. Մարգարյան, Կոմմագենեի հոգևոր մշակույթի պատմությունից Միհրականության հետքերով // Պատմության հարցեր։ Տեղեկագիր, 2009, էջ 44-45
- Ե. Մարգարյան, Հելլենիստական դարաշրջանի Կոմմագենեի և Ծոփքի պատմությունից // Լրաբեր հասարական գիտություննտրի, 2009, № 1
- Ե. Մարգարյան, Հելլենիստական քաղաքակրթության շրջափուլերը // Քաղաքագիտության հարցեր. հասարակություն, պատմություն, քաղաքակրթություն։ Միջբուհական գիտաժողովի նյութեր։ Գլխ. խմբ. Լ. Շիրինյան, Երևան 2010, էջ 178-202
- Ե. Մարգարյան, Հելլենիզմը և նրա քաղաքակրթական կերպափոխումները (Պատմական ակնարկ) // Պատմություն և կրթություն, 2010
- Ե. Մարգարյան, Անի՝ արքաքաղաք: Անուրջքաղաք: Քաղաքառասպել:Քաղաքուտոպիա Archived 2022-09-01 at the Wayback Machine Գիտական աշխատություններ / XVII, Գյումրի, 2014, է.27
- Ե. Մարգարյան, Արշալույս քրիստոնեության Հայոց, Երևան, ՀՀ ԳԱԱ «Գիտություն» հրատարակչություն, 2017
- Ե. Մարգարյան, Միհրականությունը առաջավոր Ասիայի և միջերկրածովյան ավազանի քաղաքական և կրոնահոգևոր համակարգում / Doctor of Sciences thesis, ՀՀ ԳԱԱ Արևելագիտության ինստիտուտ, 2014 (Ամբողջ տեքստը հասանելի չէ այս պահոցից)
- Ե. Մարգարյան, ԱլեքսանդրՄակեդոնացուարշավանքներ... Հայագիտական հարցեր, №3 (12), Երևան, 2017
- Маргарян Е. Г. Святилища страны Коммагена и Армения։ авто-реф. дис. . канд. истор. наук։ 07.00.02 / Е. Г. Маргарян Академия наук Армянской ССР, Ин-т истории. Ереван։ Изд-во ин-та истории, 1992. - 24 с.
- Маргарян Е. Г. Ани-царь-город. Ани-город мечты. Город-миф. Город-утопия. Գիտական աշխատություններ, № 17. pp. 27–37. ISSN 1829-4316
- Маргарян Е. Г. Полисный принцип общественной организации. Некоторые особенности полисного общежития // Сборник научных статей. Годичная конференция. Издательство РАУ, 2007. с. 55-66
- Е. Маргарян Семантика моста в армянской и славянской мифопоэтике Archived 2012-05-24 at the Wayback Machine // Вестник РАУ. 2007, №1. с. 64-76
- Маргарян Е. Г. Поиски идеального государственного обустройства в эллинистической Армении: утопия и реальность. Национальная идея // Ереван, апрель, 2008. с. 64-75 Archived 2021-05-08 at the Wayback Machine
- Маргарян Е. Г. Ани как форма жизни // Сборник статей. По материалам докладов на летней школе молодых историков стан-участниц Содружества Независимых Государств. Институт РАН РА, Институт АНА, Ереван, 2009. с. 12-45
- Маргарян Е., Мистерия об Аршаке, Васаке и Шапуре из «Истории Армении» Фауста Византийского (Опыт герменевтической реконструкции) / Ivane Javakhishvili Tbilisi State University Shota Rustaveli Institute of Georgian Literature VI International Symposium Contemporary Issues of Literary Criticism. Mythological Thinking, Folklore and Literary Discourse. Еurореаn and Caucasian Experience Dedicated to Vazha-Pshavela's 150th Anniversary. Vo1. II. Tbilisi: Institute of Literature Ртеоз, 2012. Р. 151-153. Archived 2015-05-07 at the Wayback Machine
- Маргарян Е. Г. На стыке римского и восточноэллинстического цивилизвционных «номосов». Из истории приевфратской контактной погранзоны. // Актуальные проблемы современных политико-психологических феноменов: теоретико-методологические и прикладные аспекты. Пенза-Ереван-Колин, 2012 с. 5-34
- Маргарян Е.Г. «Плодотворный» кризис и средства его преодоления. «Историко-антропологический поворот» (О некоторых тенденциях развития современной историографии в России и Армении) // Годичная научная конференция РАУ, Ереван, 2009
- Маргарян Е. Г. Проблемы дезинтеграции единого языкового пространства в странах Содружества и Балтии
- Маргарян Е. Г. Теория и практика социального устройства эллинистической Армении Archived 2019-04-12 at the Wayback Machine
- Маргарян Е. Г. Трансформация митраизма в эллинистическую эпоху (Иран, Армения, Коммагена, Рим) Archived 2022-03-27 at the Wayback Machine // Иран-наме, № 3 (19) 2011
- Е. Г. Маргарян Риторика в горах Тавра Archived 2016-09-24 at the Wayback Machine // Критика и семиотика, 2013/2(19) с. 31-84
- Е. Г. Маргарян Дифирамбическое просветление через дионисийский экстаз в романе Германа Гессе «Степной волк» Archived 2016-09-24 at the Wayback Machine // Критика и семиотика, 2014/1 с. 238-248 + elibrary.ru կայքում

== Reports and speeches ==
- Ե. Մարգարյան, Նժդեհ Արշակի կերպարը Փավստոսի «Պատմության» մեջ Archived 2019-04-12 at the Wayback Machine Գիտաժողով, 05.11.2011
- Маргарян Е. / Ervand Margarian Армения, Ереван / Armenia, Yerevan Митраизм как религиозно-мировозренческая система эллинистической Армении и сопредельном царстве Коммагена (мифология, идеология, этика) / Mithraism as a Religious-Ideological System in Hellenistic Armenia and the Adjacent Kingdom of Commagene (mythology, ideology, ethics) презентация/presentation 30 сентября 2011 Archived 2016-03-05 at the Wayback Machine
- Маргарян Е. Влияние армянской церкви и феодализма на национальный идентитет армян / Международная конференция «Диалог армянской, русской и японской культур: опыт сравнительного анализа»
- Маргарян Е. "Тифлисский "Дарельмалик". Мусульманский парадис" Дворцовый этикет грузинских царей мусульман вспомнят в Москве, 23 апреля 2015
- Маргарян Е. (Институт истории НАН Армении, Еренан) Средневековый Анн: Планировочная структура города. Теснота, экология «каменного мешка». Первый ежегодный семинар "История материальной культуры народов Евразии" 2015
- Маргарян Е. Средневековый Тифлис. Ход времени: будни и праздники Daugavpils University : XXVI International Scientific Conference 29.01.2016
- Маргарян Е. Митраизм в контексте раннехристианской сотериологии. Благовест / На заре армянского христианства. Международная конференция. Тезисы докладов., Е., "Гитутюн", 2016 г.
- Маргарян Е. Традиционное право в средневековои Тифлисе (на материале описания божьего суда в "Истории Грузии" Парсадана Гогиджанидзе) / Ժամանակակից լեզվաբանությունը միջգիտակարգայնության լույսի ներքո / 17—18 մայիսի 2016 թ., ԵՊՀ հրատարակչություն, 2016 թ.
