= Ruben Orbeli =

Soviet archeologist, historian and jurist

- Born: 26 January 1880; Nakhchivan, Russian Empire
- Died: 9 May 1943 (aged 56); Moscow, Soviet Union
- Known for: founder of soviet underwater archaeology

Academic background
- Education: St. Petersburg University

Academic work
- Discipline: Jurisprudence, History, Archaeology
- Institutions: Soviet Union Academy of Sciences

Ruben Orbeli (Armenian: Ռուբեն Աբգարի Օրբելի, Ruben Abgari Orbeli; Russian: Рубен Абгарович Орбели, Ruben Abgarovich Orbeli; 26 January (O.S. 7 February) 1880 – 9 May 1943) was a Soviet archeologist, historian and jurist, who was renowned as the founder of Soviet underwater archeology. He was the elder brother of Joseph and Leon Orbeli, and Rusadan Orbeli's father.

== Biography ==
Born into a medieval noble family in Nakhchivan, Russian Empire in 1880, Ruben Orbeli completed his secondary education at a classical gymnasium in Tiflis. Some time later he went to study at S.Petersburg University. In 1903, after graduating from the university, Ruben Orbeli stayed there to be a professor of jurisprudence. From 1904 to 1906 Orbeli worked at society of magistrates and then he was elected a member of Saint Petersburg State University's juristic society. During this period he was sent to Germany for improvement his knowledge.

In 1906 Ruben Orbeli became a laws magistr of Saint Petersburg State University's and a laws doctor of Jene University's, also he was author and editor a series of articles in newspaper of Russian treasury department from this moment.

In 1918 Ruben became one of the founder Tambov State University, where he taught and read lecture. After that he returned to Saint Petersburg State University and worked in branch of USSR Science Academy.

In 1934 on Aleksey Krylov recommendation Ruben Orbeli was invited into the EPRON, while he took up a post of consultant and historian. From this time Armenian scientist was studying archaeological underwater monuments. Beginning from 1937 to 1939 he organized a series of underwater archeology expeditions to the Black Sea and other water basins. The during his science activities professor Orbeli created a method of keeping monuments that were risen out of water. He also introduced the term of underwater archaeology in science

Ruben Orbeli died on 9 May 1943. He was buried in an Armenian cemetery in Moscow.

== See also ==
- Orbely family
