= Orbeli family =

Armenian family

Orbeli
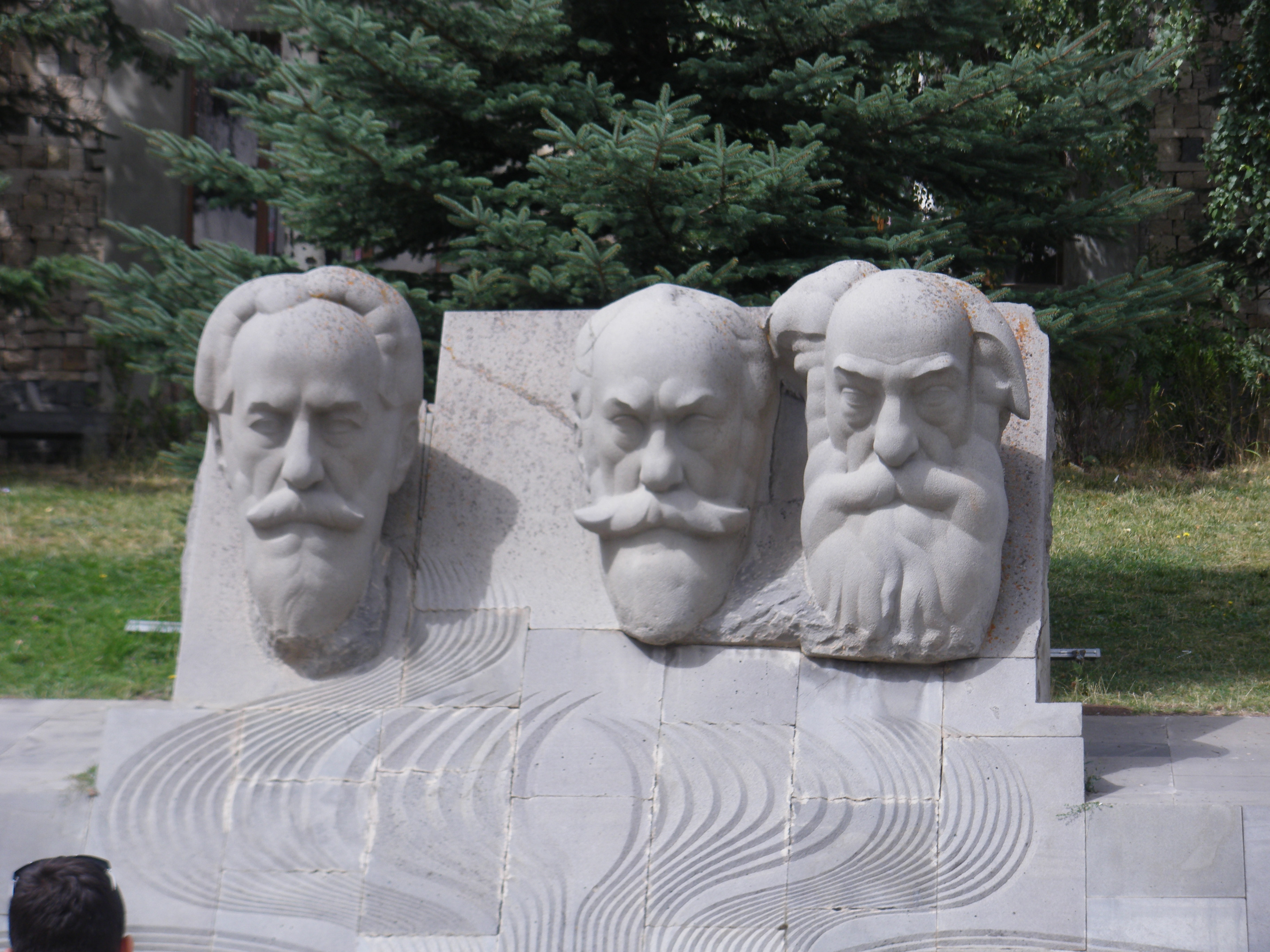
- Origin: Armenia
- Members: Leon Orbeli; Joseph Orbeli; Ruben Orbeli; Maria Orbeli; Rusadan Orbeli; Abgar Orbeli

The Orbeli family is an Armenian family, whose members have included notable scientists for over 12 centuries. The president of Russian Academy of Sciences Yuri Osipov and the president of Armenian National Academy of Sciences Faddey Sarkisyan, referring to the Orbeli family, noted:
«The family is famous starting from XII centuries. Service to science always was cultivated in Orbeli family This tradition was passed across the generations. The father of Orbeli brothers prepared his sons to science career from childhood. One grandfather of Orbeli brothers was a protoiereus in Armenian church, he wrote about Armenian history in the oldest Armenian language. Another grandfather was a law teacher in Lazarev Institute of Oriental Languages. David Orbeli is uncle of scientists was a famous psychiatrist in Tbilisi. He had a lot books and works at psychiatry and ethnography. Their father is Abgar Orbeli graduated Saint Petersburg State University. Also their ancestor on mother line is Hovsep Argutinsky was the beneficiary of Armenian church in Russia. In 1800 his elected as a Catholicos of All Armenians, and also he was one of authors project Independent Armenia under Russian patronage.»

== Family members ==
- Joseph Orbeli (1887—1961) — Armenian and Soviet orientalist, historian, and academician who specialized in medieval history of Southern Caucasus and administered the State Hermitage Museum in Leningrad from 1934 to 1951. Of Armenian descent, he was the founder and first president of the Armenian National Academy of Sciences (1943–47).
- Leon Orbeli (1882—1958) — Armenian and Soviet physiologist and academician.
  - Maria Orbeli (1916—1949) — Soviet physicist and daughter of Leon Orbeli.
    - Abgar Orbeli (1939—2022) — Soviet and Russian physicist and grandson of Leon Orbeli.
- Ruben Orbeli (1880—1943) — Armenian and Soviet Union scientist. He was one of the founders of soviet underwater archaeology.
  - Rusadan Orbeli (1910—1985) — Soviet orientalist and daughter of Ruben Orbeli.

== Memory ==
=== Movie ===
- Orbeli's code (Russian: Код Орбели) — Armenian-Russian documentary film. It was filmed in 2012.

=== Toponyms ===
- Orbeli st — street in Yerevan
- Orbeli st — street in Kryvyi Rih
- Orbeli st — street in Nizhny Novgorod
- Orbeli st — street in Saint Petersburg
