= Ashot Melkonyan =

Armenian academic (born 1961)

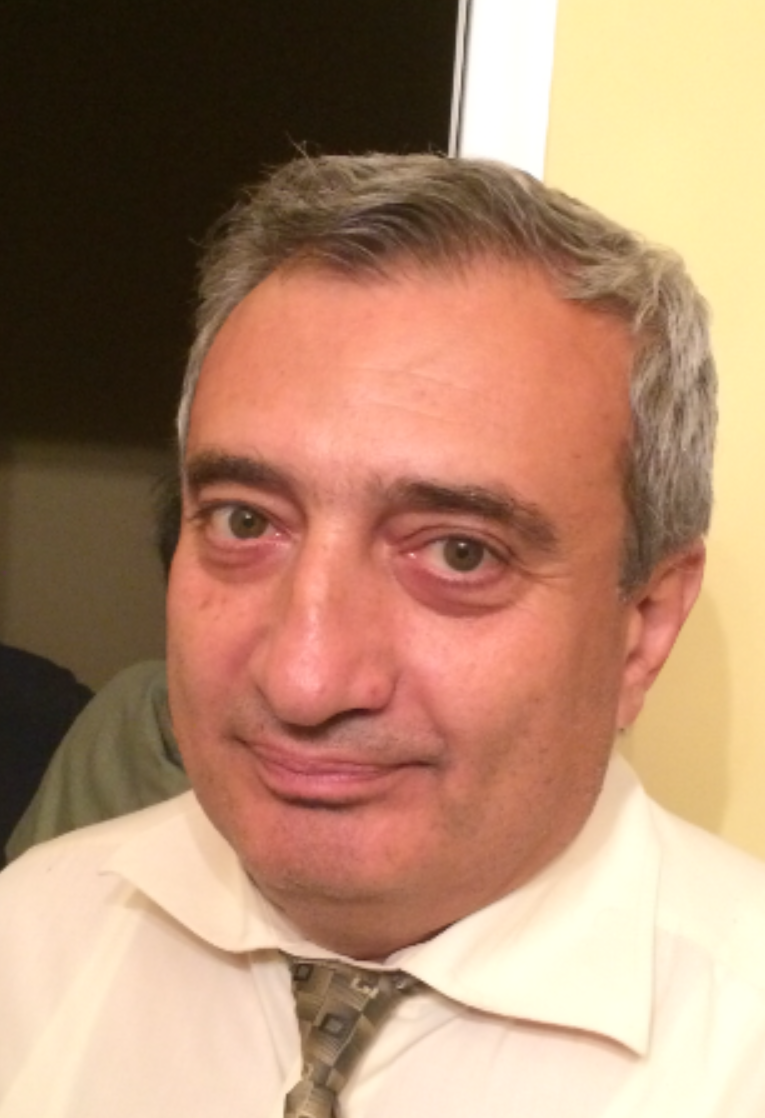
- Ashot A. Melkonyan
- Born: 16 February 1961 (age 65); Akhalkalak, Javakheti, Georgian SSR
- Education: Yerevan State University
- Occupations: Professor and historian

Ashot A. Melkonyan (Armenian: Աշոտ Մելքոնյան; born on 16 February, 1961 in Akhalkalak, Javakheti, Georgian SSR) is a historian, professor, and academic advisor at the Academy of Sciences of Armenia. Since 2002, he has been the Director of the Institute of History of National Academy of Sciences of Armenia.

== Biography ==
He graduated from the Faculty of History at Yerevan State University (YSU) in 1982 and received his PhD in history at YSU in 1989. Since 2002 he has been a lecturer and Chair of History of Armenia at Yerevan State University. He is a member of the Association of historians of the European Educational Networking Institute (EENI) countries.

Melkonyan is an author of several historical studies (including monographs and over 350 articles). The works are devoted mainly to the history of Armenia, the Armenian genocide, Javakheti, and Armenian–Georgian relations.

== Awards ==
- Prize of Armenia Fund (for his Erzerum monography, 1994)
- Movses Khorenatsi medal (2003)
- Haykashen Uzunyan Prize of Tekeyan Cultural Union (for his Javakhk in the 19th Century and the 1st Quarter of the 20th Century (A Historical Research) monography, 2004)
- Honorary citizen of Akhalkalak (2009)
- Andranik Ozanyan medal (2013)

== Bibliography ==
=== In English ===
- Javakhk in the 19th Century and the 1st Quarter of the 20th Century (A Historical Research), Yerevan, 2007, 256 pages.
