= Maria Orbeli =

Soviet physicist of Armenian origin

- Born: Maria Leonovna Orbeli; 1916; Petrograd, Russian Empire
- Died: 1949 (aged 32–33); Leningrad, Soviet Union
- Scientific career
- Fields: Physics

Maria Orbeli (Russian: Мария Орбели) (1916 — 1949) was a Soviet physicist of Armenian origin. She was the daughter of well-known Soviet physiologist and academician Leon Orbeli.

== Biography ==
Maria Orbeli was born to parents Leon Orbeli and Elizabeth Aladjova in 1916. She belonged to renowned Armenian clan of scientists, whose ancestors were known from twelve centuries. In 1938, Orbeli graduated from Leningrad University and began to work at Voeikov Observatory. From 1939 to 1949, she worked in Khlopin Radium Institute. Orbeli studied nuclear physics and the division of uranium under the influence of neutrons. During her work, she got sick with acute radiation syndrome, which lead to her death.

Maria Orbeli was buried at the Bogoslovskoe Cemetery in 1949.

== See also ==
- Orbeli family
