= Ricochet (musician) =

Russian singer (1964–2007)

Ricochet (Russian: Рикошет, born Alexander Yuryevich Aksyonov; September 3, 1964, Leningrad – March 22, 2007, Saint Petersburg) was a Russian singer-songwriter, leader of post-punk band "Obyekt Nasmeshek".

== Biography ==
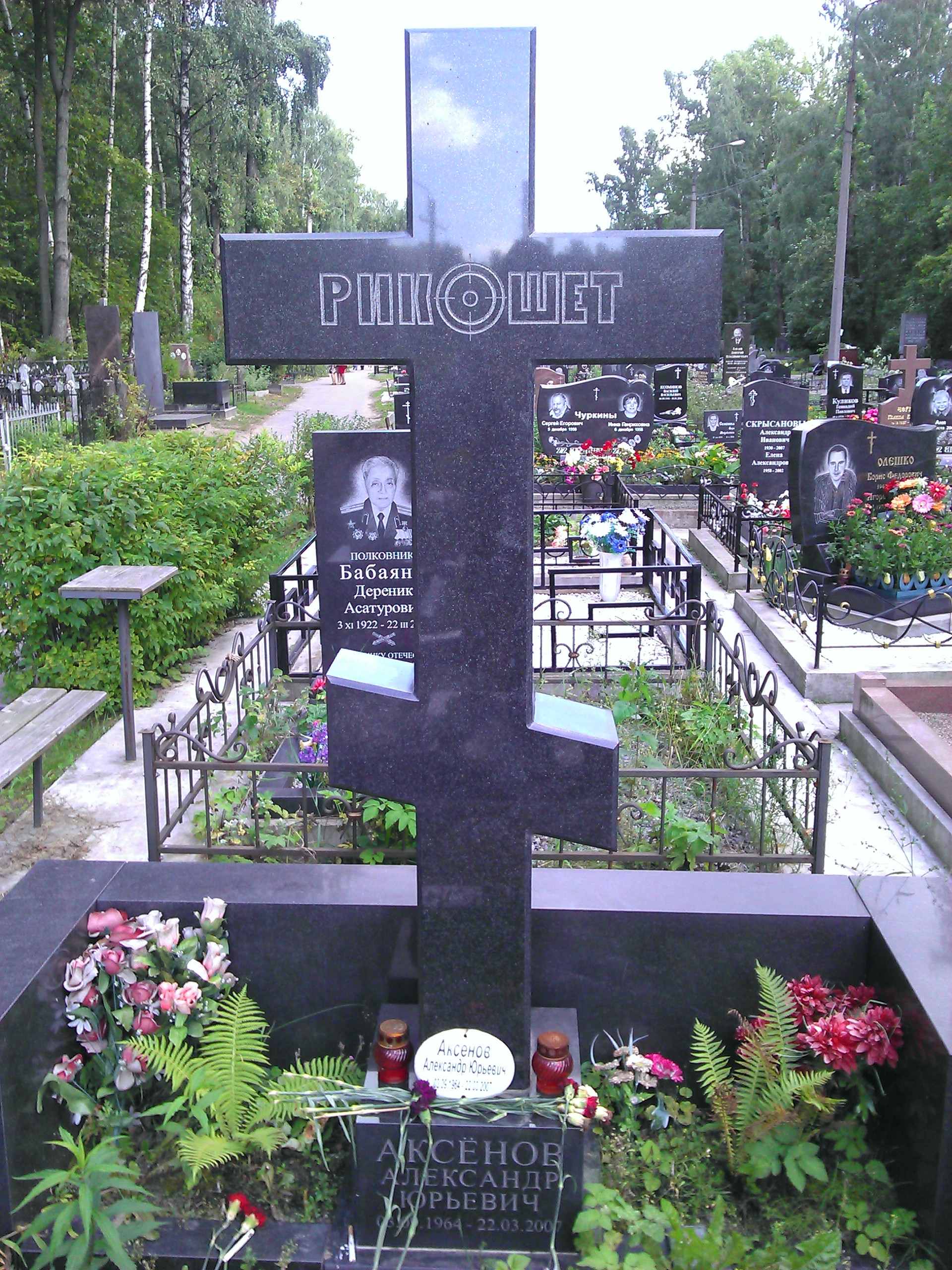

The first musical performance was held in 1980 as part of the school band "Rezinovy Rikoshet" (Rubber Ricochet). Later it was established an underground group "Crossword", which included fellows of Ricochet. Later he played with several Leningrad punk bands. In 1985 he created his own group "Obyekt Nasmeshek" (Object of Ridicule), which achieved popularity quickly.

After the group disbanded in 1990, he left music for few years. In 1994 he return to the music scene, when he gave a few concerts. In 1995, he released his album "Blyuz dlya negodyaya" (Blues for a scoundrel). In 1995 and 1996, he was the organizer of the festival "New Wave rock St. Petersburg". In 1996 he took part in the Theatre DDT Festival "Napolnim nebo dobrotoy" (Let's Fill the Sky With Kindness). In 1998 he recorded with Konstantin Kinchev album "Geopolitika" (Geopolitics).

As a sound engineer and producer Ricochet worked on studio projects of various groups. In 2000 came a collection of "Ricochet + Baltic Rap". In 2002, the album "Do not shoot! Black Glasses". He also recorded an album of remixes of songs of the Kino.

Ricochet died of a heart attack March 22, 2007 at the age of 42. He is buried in St. Petersburg, at the Bogoslovskoe Cemetery. He was married to Viktor Tsoi's widow, Marianna Tsoi.

== See Also ==
- Begemotion Records
