= Yevgeny Charushin =

Russian painter

Yevgeny Ivanovich Charushin
- Евгений Иванович Чарушин
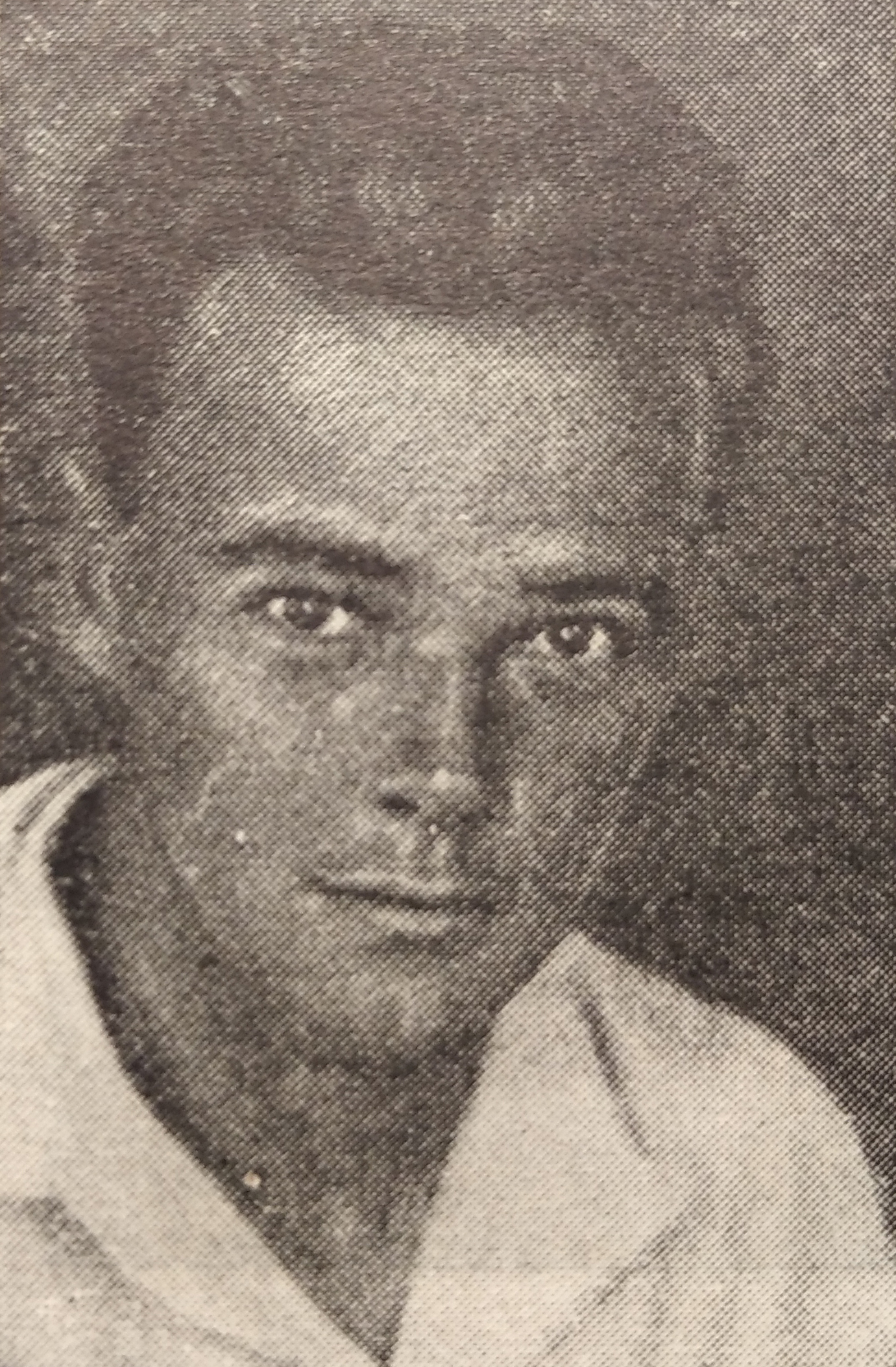
- Born: November 11, 1901; Vyatka, Russian Empire
- Died: February 18, 1965 (aged 63); Leningrad, Russian SFSR, Soviet Union
- Occupations: illustrator; writer

Yevgeny Charushin, Illustration to children book Vaska, Bobka and She-Rabbit, 1934

Yevgeny Ivanovich Charushin (Russian: Евгений Иванович Чарушин; 11 November 1901 Vyatka – 18 February 1965 Leningrad) was a Russian illustrator and author of children's literature in the Soviet Union.

Charushin was born into the family of a Vyatka architect. His father, Ivan Charushin, encouraged his early artistic efforts and his love of nature and hunting, all of which played a role in his development as an illustrator and writer. After graduating from high school in 1918, Charushin was drafted into the army. He was posted to Petrograd in 1922 to attend the Russian Academy of Arts, and he graduated in 1926.

After graduation from the academy, Charushin started to work as an illustrator under the guidance of Vladimir Lebedev, who was at that time the artistic director of the children's literature department at the Leningrad offices of Gosizdat (the Soviet government publishing house). The first book with his illustrations, Murzik by Vitaly Valentinovich Bianki (1928) was a success that led to invitations to illustrate many more books by, among others, Samuil Marshak, Korney Chukovsky, Dmitry Mamin-Sibiryak, Mikhail Prishvin, Vladimir Arsenyev and Alexander Vvedensky. At the same time, Charushin began writing and illustrating his own children's books, including "Little Beasties" ("Zveryata"), "Mishka," and "Wolf Cub" ("Volchishko"). He would be best known for his stories and illustrations of animals. In an essay he wrote about his work for the magazine, "Children's Literature," in 1935, Charushin stated that "More than anything else, I love to depict young animals, touching in their helplessness and interesting, because within them one can already see signs of the full-grown beast."

During World War II, Charushin lived in his native city (renamed Kirov in 1934) and directed his creative energies toward supporting the Soviet Union's war efforts. He designed panels and drawings for the "TASS Windows" project, painted agitational murals and paintings of partisans, and organized performances at the Kirov Drama Theater. Perhaps his most significant artistic work during those years in Kirov was a mural for a factory kindergarten and the foyer of the local House of Pioneers and Schoolchildren.

Charushin returned to Leningrad in 1945 and turned once again to books, as well as to a series of prints and easel compositions on his favorite themes: "Tiger cub" ("Tigrenok"), "Mother Rabbit and her Babies" ("Zaichikha s zaichatami"), "The Crow's Breakfast" ("Vorona za zavtrakom"), "Mother Bear and her Cubs" ("Medveditsa s medvezhatami"), "The Wolf" ("Volk"), and others. He also began to do more sculpting, continuing to work on a series of animal figurines that he began in 1941. The last work he completed before his death was the illustrations for Samuil Marshak's "Cubs in Cages" ("Detki v kletke"). He was awarded the gold medal in the children's book category at the Leipzig International Exhibition in 1965.

== Sources ==
- Charushin's bio and works (in Russian)
- Biography (in Russian)
