= Institute of History of National Academy of Sciences of Armenia =

Non-profit organization

The Institute of History of the National Academy of Sciences of Armenia is a research institute studying the history of the Armenian people in Yerevan. It is a governmental non-profit organization based in the Ministry of Education and Science of the Republic of Armenia. It was founded in 1943 by Hovsep Orbeli as the first director.

== History ==
In November 1943 by the order of the Government of Soviet Armenia, Academy of Sciences of Armenia was established. As a part of the Academy the Institute of History became a separate institution. Among the directors of the Institute were Ashot Hovhannisyan, Suren Yeremian and Galust Galoyan. Since 2002 to the present day the director of the institute is the Academician, Professor Ashot Melkonyan.

Currently, the Institute employs 2 academicians, 2 corresponding members, 21 doctors and 47 candidates (PhD) of sciences. The main fields of activity include the formation of the Armenian people in the Armenian Highland, History of the Armenian Church, The Armenian Question and the Genocide of the Armenians, The Armenian Historiography and Source Studies.

Institute of History of NAS RA is a member of the International Association of the Institutes of History of the CIS countries.

== See also ==
- Patma-Banasirakan Handes
