= Russian destroyer Vice-Admiral Kulakov =

Udaloy-class destroyer of the Russian Navy

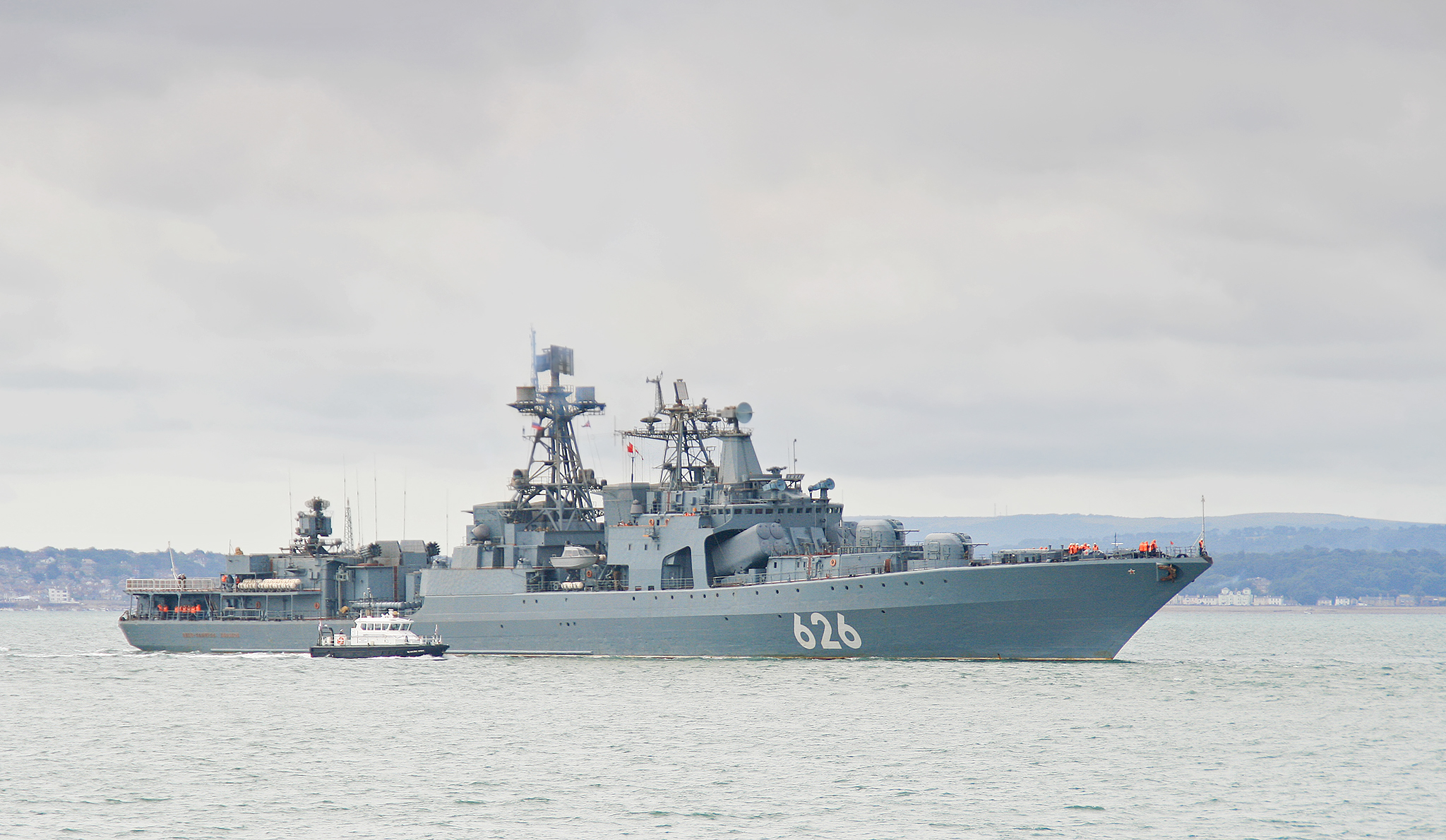
- Vice-Admiral Kulakov on 24 August 2012 visiting Portsmouth Naval Base, UK.

History

Russia
- Name: Vice-Admiral Kulakov
- Namesake: Nikolai Kulakov
- Ordered: 13 July 1977
- Builder: Works in the name of A. A. Zhdanov, Leningrad
- Laid down: 4 November 1977
- Launched: 16 May 1980
- Commissioned: 29 December 1981
- Refit: 1991–2010
- Status: In active service

General characteristics
- Class & type: Udaloy-class destroyer
- Displacement: 6,200 t (6,102 long tons) standard; 7,900 t (7,775 long tons) full load
- Length: 163 m (535 ft)
- Beam: 19 m (62 ft)
- Draught: 7.8 m (26 ft)
- Propulsion: 2 shaft COGAG, 4 gas turbines, 89,000 kW (120,000 hp)
- Speed: 35 knots (65 km/h)
- Range: 10,500 nautical miles (19,400 km) at 14 knots (26 km/h; 16 mph)
- Complement: 300
- Sensors & processing systems: 1 × New Fregat MAE radar complex
- Armament: 2 × 4 SS-N-14 anti submarine/ship missiles; 4 × vertical launchers for SA-N-9 surface-to-air missiles; 1 × Gibka (3M47) ADMS station; 2 × 1 100 mm (3.9 in) guns; 4 × 30 mm AK630 Gatling guns; 2 × 4 553 mm (22 in) torpedo tubes, Type 53 ASW/ASuW torpedo; 2 × RBU-6000 anti-submarine rocket launchers
- Aircraft carried: 2 x Ka-27 'Helix' series helicopters
- Aviation facilities: Helicopter deck and hangar

Vice-Admiral Kulakov (Russian: «Вице-адмирал Кулаков») is an Udaloy-class destroyer of the Russian Navy. As of 2025, the ship is in active service. She is named after Soviet naval officer Nikolai Kulakov.

== History ==
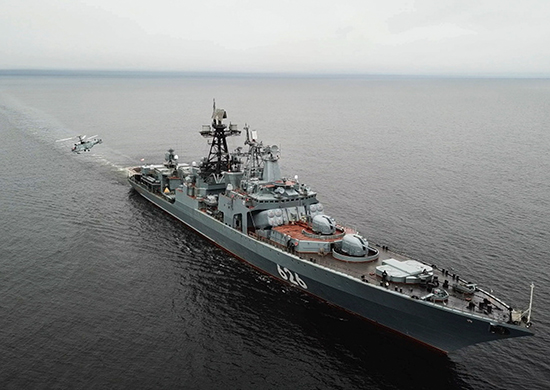
Vice-Admiral Kulakov in an exercise

Vice-Admiral Kulakov was commissioned in December 1981 and was in service with the Soviet Northern Fleet until March 1991, when she was retired for repairs that lasted more than 18 years. The ship travelled to Severomorsk base on 7 December 2010 in preparation for the vessel's return to active duty. On 5 January 2011, a fire broke out in one of the ship's mess-rooms. It was reported to be caused by a short circuit. The damage was minimal and did not reduce the combat effectiveness of the ship.

On 3 September 2011 the destroyer conducted the first underway landings tests for the new Ka-52K helicopter.

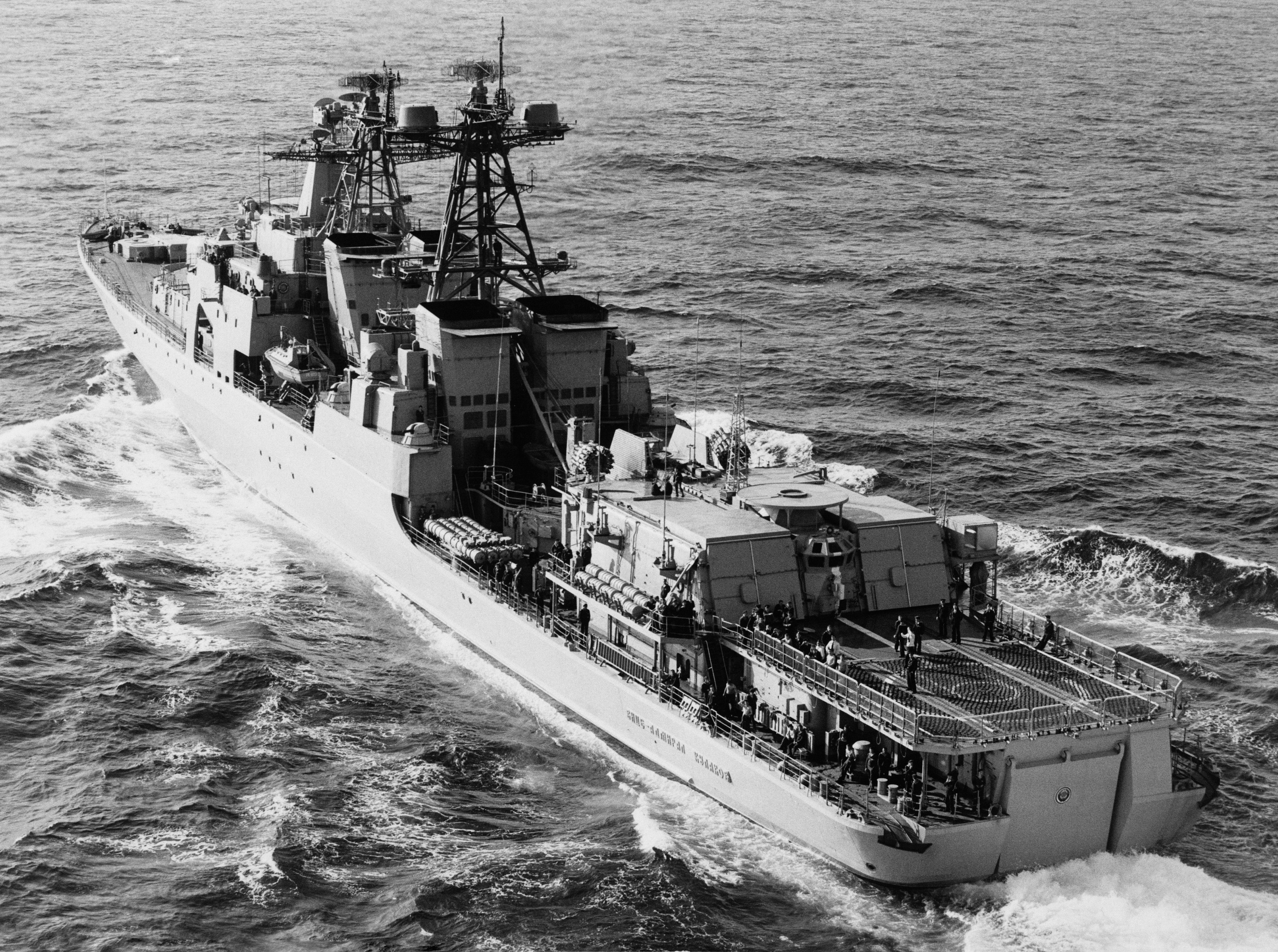
Vice-Admiral Kulakov in 1985

In 2012 the destroyer escorted commercial convoys as part of the anti-piracy mission in the Gulf of Aden. In July 2012, Vice-Admiral Kulakov led a flotilla of the Northern Fleet to the Eastern Mediterranean to conduct naval drills, close to the Syrian coast. In August 2012 she paid a five-day visit to Portsmouth Naval Base, England. In September 2012 Vice-Admiral Kulakov visited Cobh, Ireland.

Vice-Admiral Kulakov was part of the 70th anniversary commemorations of the Battle of the Atlantic in Liverpool, England in May 2013.

In April 2014, a British destroyer, HMS Dragon, was deployed to waters north of Scotland to track Vice-Admiral Kulakov as the destroyer sailed near the United Kingdom amid heightened tensions between Russia and the UK.

In 2016, she was sent to the eastern Mediterranean, to back the air campaign in Syria and fly the flag In March 2016, as she and supporting Russian ships entered the United Kingdom's exclusive economic zone, they were intercepted and escorted by the British frigate HMS Somerset.

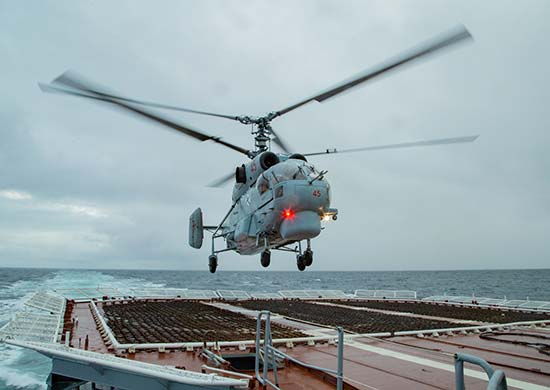
Landing of a Ka-27 helicopter on the deck of a large anti-submarine ship Vice-Admiral Kulakov

In 2020, it was reported that she would be upgraded to the standard of the recently refitted Marshal Shaposhnikov. On 8 June 2020, Vice-Admiral Kulakov entered the Barents Sea to conduct anti-submarine exercises. Afterwards, she sailed to Kronstadt to participate in the Navy day parade on 26 July. Accompanied by tanker Akademik Pashin and tug Altay, she then entered the Mediterranean Sea and paid several port visits. Between 11 and 13 August she visited Algeria, between 30 August–2 September Cyprus, between 19 and 22 October Greece and on 1 November Syria. The ship detachment was commanded by the Chief of staff of the brigade of anti-submarine ships of the Northern Fleet Captain 1st rank Stanislav Varik. On her way to the homeport, the ship passed Pas-de-Calais on 14 November, entered the Barents Sea on 8 December and returned to homeport Severomorsk on 10 December, where the ship detachment was greeted by the commander of the Northern Fleet Aleksandr Moiseyev.

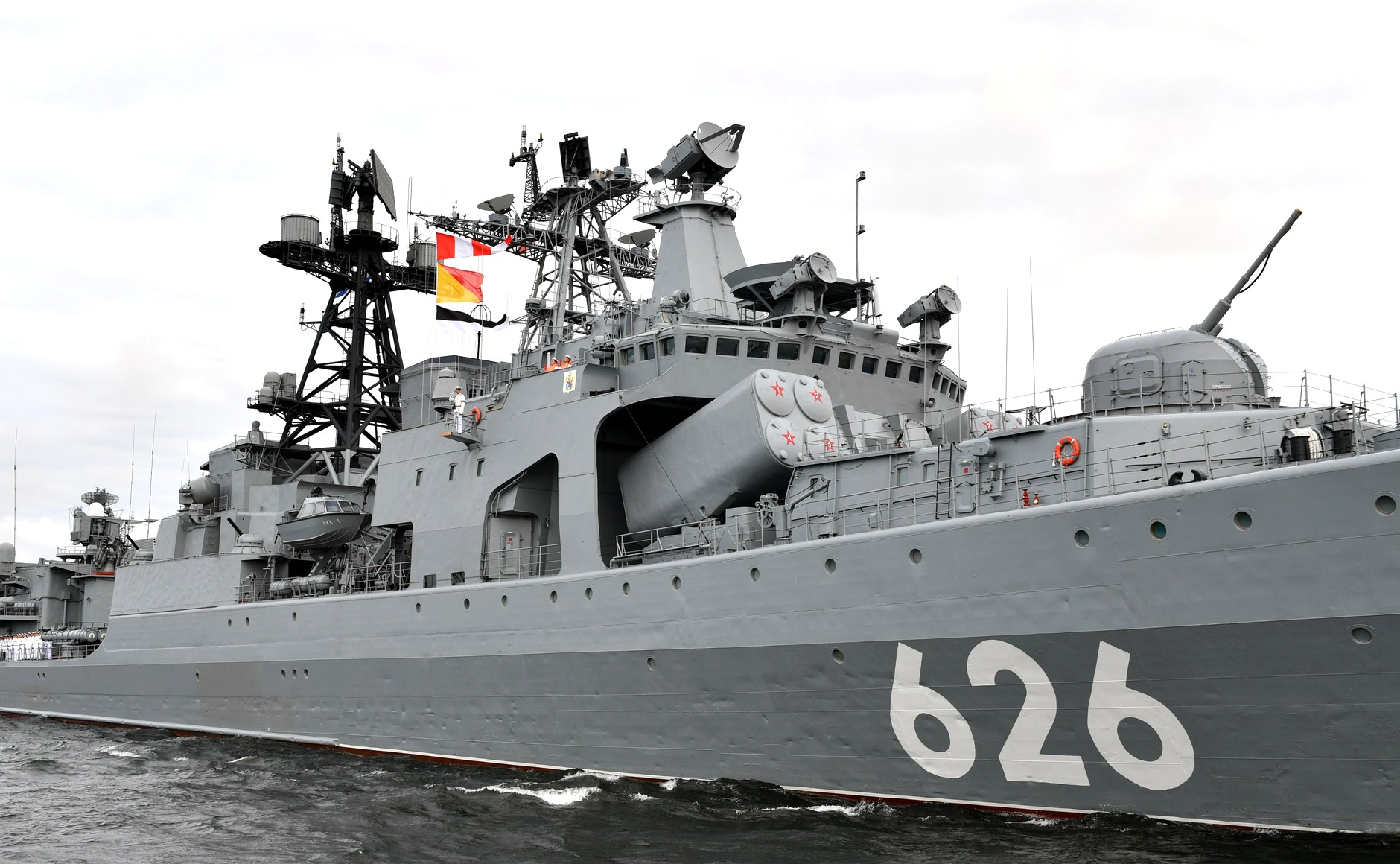
Large anti-submarine ship Vice-Admiral Kulakov. Main naval parade, July 25, 2021

In 2021, Vice-Admiral Kulakov was deployed to the Mediterranean Sea and, afterwards, the Gulf of Guinea along with tanker Akademik Pashin and tug Altay, where on 25 October, the destroyer freed the container ship Lucia sailing under Panamanian flag from Togo to Cameroon that came under attack of pirates. On the way back, the destroyer monitored large-scale NATO naval exercise in the Norwegian Sea with two Norwegian frigates, four corvettes, two submarines and other ships, as well as a German, French, Danish and Portuguese frigate.

On 7 February 2022, as part of a concentration of Russian naval forces in the Mediterranean, Vice-Admiral Kulakov again deployed to the Mediterranean, along with the cruiser Marshal Ustinov, frigate Admiral Kasatonov and tanker Vyazma. The destroyer departed the Mediterranean on 24 August 2022 ostensibly destined for its home base Severomorsk. On deployment in the Baltic as of 2025, the destroyer was reported to have fended off a drone attack.

Did pass Great Belt Bridge, Denmark, nordbound 16 december 2025.
