= Nikolai Kulakov =

Soviet naval officer (1908-1976)

Nikolai Mikhailovich Kulakov
- Born: 15 February [O.S. 2 February] 1908; Ivanovo, Kimovsky District, Tula Governorate, Russian Empire
- Died: 25 March 1976 (aged 68) Leningrad
- Buried: Bogoslovskoe Cemetery
- Allegiance: Soviet Union
- Branch: Soviet Navy
- Service years: 1932–1971
- Rank: Vice-Admiral
- Conflicts: Second World War
- Awards: Hero of the Soviet Union; Order of Lenin – twice Order of Nakhimov First Class; Order of the Red Banner – twice Order of the Red Star

Nikolai Mikhailovich Kulakov (Russian: Николай Михайлович Кулаков) (15 February [O.S. 2 February] 1908 – 25 March 1976) was an officer of the Soviet Navy. He saw action in the Second World War and rose to the rank of vice-admiral, despite being demoted three times in his career.

Born in 1908, Kulakov initially began studying in Kiev for a career as a railway worker, before coming into contact with the navy through the local Komsomol. Joining the navy in 1932, he entered the political branch, serving as a military commissar on several vessels, before sitting on the Military Councils of the Northern and then the Black Sea Fleets. Serving on the Black Sea during the start of the German invasion of the Soviet Union in 1941, Kulakov took part in planning the defences of the Black Sea ports, and when they were overwhelmed, the counterattacks. The heavy human cost of these brought the Military Council under investigation and Kulakov suffered his first demotion, from rear-admiral to captain 1st rank, and reassignment.

Returned to useful work and restored to his former rank by the Navy's commander in chief, Nikolay Kuznetsov, Kulakov repaid Kuznetsov by acting as his prosecutor in a trial on charges of giving away military secrets, and succeeded in having Kuznetsov demoted. Kulakov himself was demoted shortly afterwards for "unsatisfactory leadership of party political work", but once more returned to prominence and former rank with service with the Black Sea Fleet. Implicated in the loss of the battleship Novorossiisk in 1955, Kulakov was demoted for a third time and transferred to the Baltic Fleet. Here he rebuilt his career in the navy's political department once more, returning to the rank of vice-admiral and being awarded the title of Hero of the Soviet Union. He retired in 1971 and died in 1976.

== Early life ==
Kulakov was born on 15 February [O.S. 2 February] 1908 in Ivanovo, Kimovsky District, then part of Tula Governorate, in the Russian Empire. His father was a railway worker, and after graduating from school Nikolai Kulakov entered the Kiev school which trained workers for a locomotive repair plant. The plant's Komsomol sponsored ships of the Black Sea Fleet, and through this Kulakov became acquainted with the navy. He joined the Communist Party in 1927, was elected to the plant's party bureau and was then transferred to party work in Leningrad.

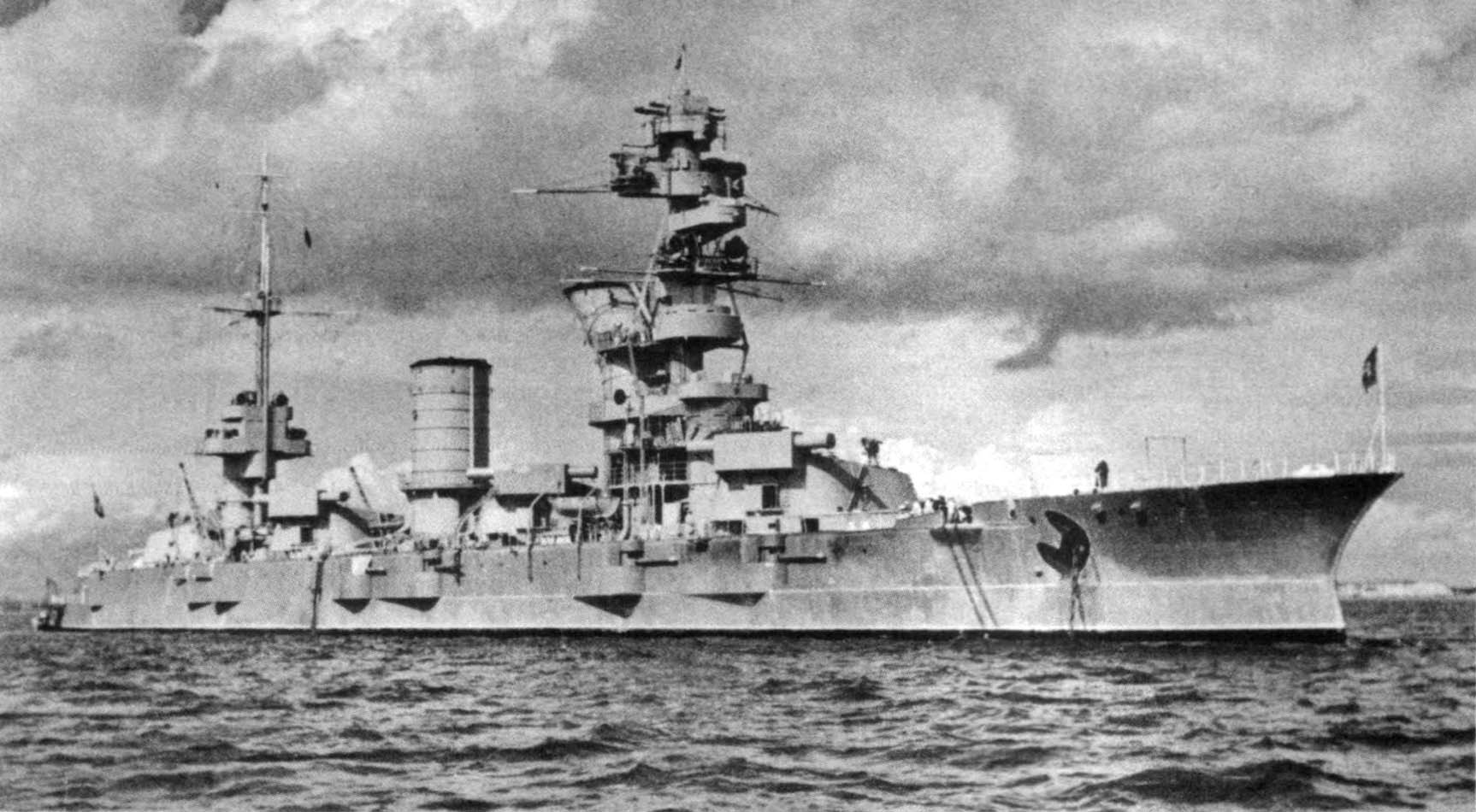
The battleship Marat, Kulakov's ship from August 1938

Kulakov joined the navy in August 1932 and studied at the N. G. Tolmachyov Military-Political Academy, graduating in 1937. From July 1937 he was appointed military commissar of the Baltic Fleet submarines Shch-318 and then S-1, followed by a posting as commissar in August 1938 to the battleship Marat. In June 1939 he became a member of the Military Council of the Northern Fleet. With tensions with Nazi Germany rising, and the German invasion of Norway in 1940, Kulakov was involved in the decision to transfer some of the Baltic Fleet's ships to the Northern Fleet for operations in the ice-free parts of the Barents Sea. In April 1940 Kulakov became a member of the Military Council of the Black Sea Fleet, and on 8 August 1940 was appointed a divisional commissioner.

== Great Patriotic War ==
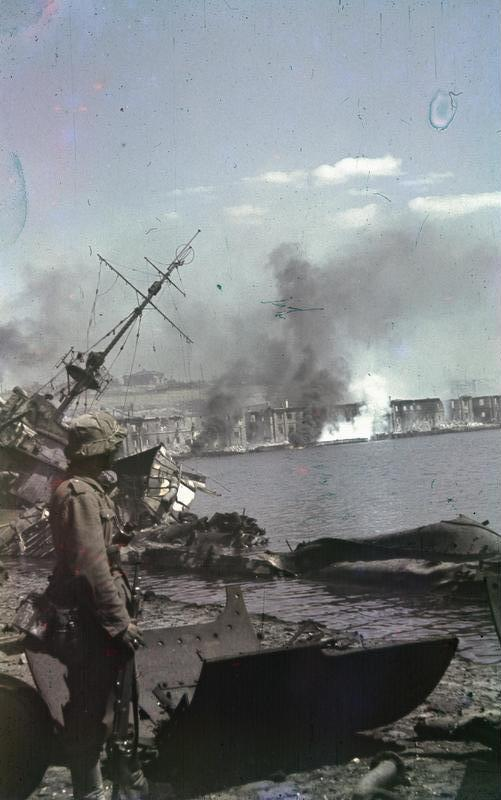
The ruins of Sevastopol harbour after the city's capture by German forces. The failed defence, and subsequent losses in counterattacks, caused Kulakov's first fall from grace.

With the German invasion of the Soviet Union in 1941, Kulakov was involved in planning the defence of the Black Sea Fleet's ports, and in organising counterattacks by Soviet Naval Aviation and units of the Danube Flotilla. He oversaw the activities of the political bodies and party organizations of the Black Sea Fleet during this time. With the German advance to the Black Sea, Kulakov helped to organise the preparation of defences for Odessa, and when that city fell, those of Sevastopol. The German campaign through the Crimea forced the Soviet forces back and in 1942 Sevastopol also fell. Kulakov helped in the evacuation, and flew out of the city on the last military aircraft. On 13 December 1942 divisional commissioners like Kulakov were ranked as rear admirals, and he was sent to Gelendzhik to assist in preparing counterattacks.

Kulakov had a hand in organising the amphibious assaults against Novorossiysk, including that led by Tsezar Kunikov, but the heavy losses sustained in the Kerch–Eltigen Operation brought official disapproval, and the Military Council was condemned as unsatisfactory. In January 1944, Kulakov was dismissed from his post and on 3 February 1944 was demoted to captain 1st rank. From March 1944 he served as head of the Navy's Higher military-political courses. With the help of the Navy's Commander-in-Chief, Admiral Nikolay Kuznetsov, Kulakov was in June 1944 appointed Head of the Department of Propaganda and Agitation of the Main Political Directorate, and restored to his rank of rear-admiral on 21 July 1944. In March 1945 he was again assigned to the Military Council of the Northern Fleet. He was promoted to the rank of vice-admiral and became deputy commander-in-chief of the Navy for political affairs.

== Postwar ==
In 1948 Kulakov, as deputy commander-in-chief of the Navy for political affairs, served as judge and public prosecutor at the trial of admirals Lev Galler, Vladimir Alafuzov, vice-admiral Georgy Stepanov and the navy's former commander-in-chief and the man who had restored him to his former position, Nikolay Kuznetsov. They were accused of passing military secrets to the UK and the USA. Kuznetsov recalled how "The voice of the prosecutor N. M. Kulakov, who had already called us all sorts of obscene words, still demanded that we be punished as strictly as possible." Admiral Vladimir Kasatonov observed that "N. M. Kulakov, who Nikolai Gerasimovich [Kuznetsov] once saved from responsibility for blunders and mistakes in the most difficult times, was not only the correct “watchdog” for the accusations, but also tried to humiliate the personal dignity of the accused." Kuznetsov was found guilty and demoted. The other admirals were sentenced to terms of imprisonment. Despite Kulakov's loyal participation in the trial, in December 1949 he too was accused, this time of "unsatisfactory leadership of party political work in the 8th Fleet" and was again demoted to rear admiral and dismissed from his post. In January 1950 he enrolled at the KE Voroshilov Higher Military Academy, but in April he was recalled and re-appointed a member of the Military Council of the Black Sea Fleet and reinstated to the rank of vice-admiral.

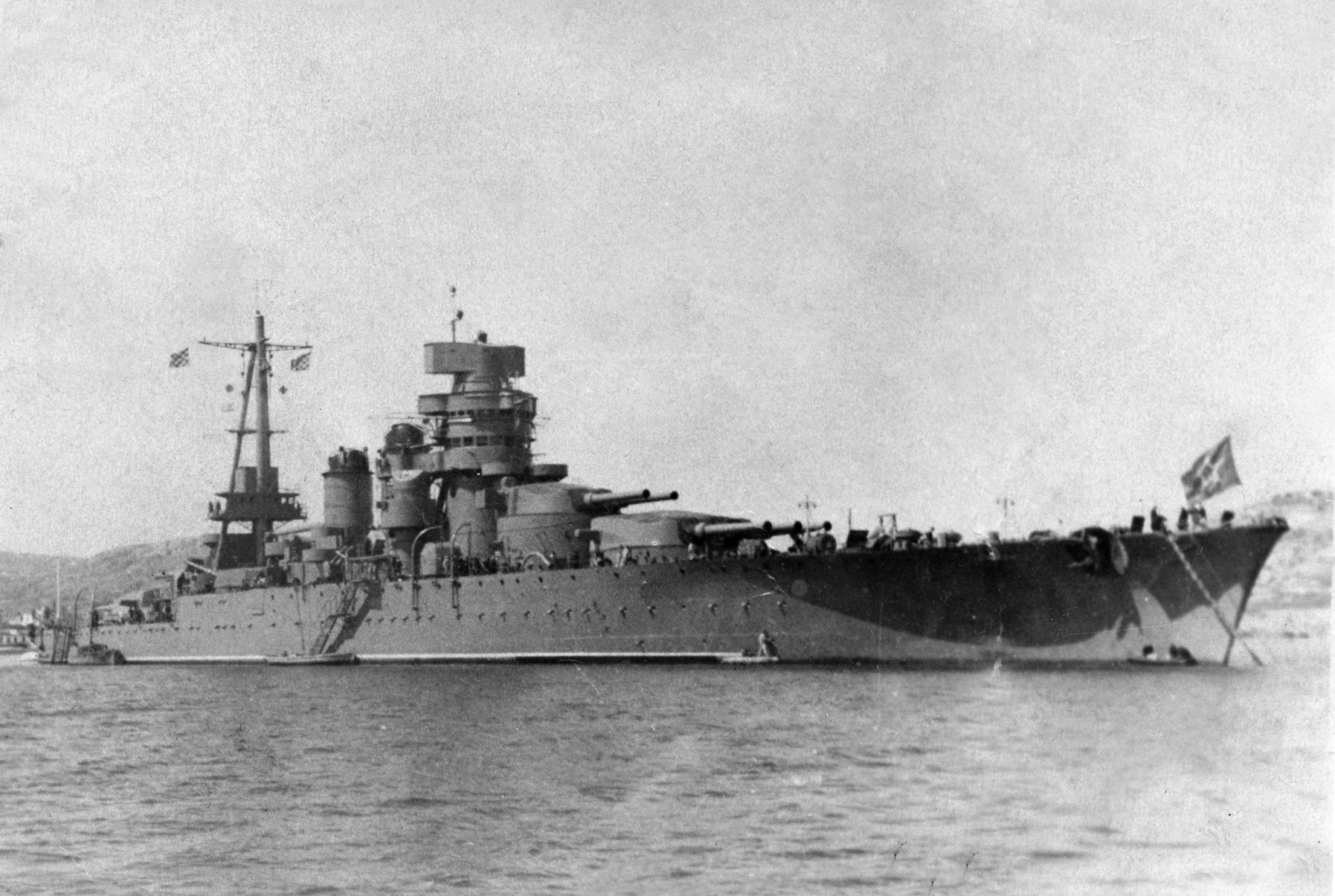
The battleship Novorossiisk moored in Sevastopol. Her loss in 1955 was another blight on Kulakov's career.

Kulakov's career continued to be blighted by misfortune. In 1955 the battleship Novorossiisk, the former Italian Giulio Cesare, was destroyed by a sudden explosion while in port at Sevastopol. An old wartime German naval mine was considered the most likely explanation, but Kulakov was among those discredited in the affair. He was once more demoted to rear-admiral on 8 December 1955 and in May 1956 sent to serve as head of the political department and deputy political director of the Kronstadt naval fortress. He once more rose in the ranks, in 1960 he was reinstated as vice-admiral and in April became Commander of the Leningrad Naval District. From July 1961 he became Head of the Political Department of the Leningrad Naval Base and the Naval Educational Institutions of Leningrad. On 7 May 1965, the 20th anniversary of the victory over Germany, Kulakov was awarded the title of Hero of the Soviet Union. He retired from the navy in December 1971, and died on 25 March 1976. He was buried in the Bogoslovskoe Cemetery in Leningrad.

== Awards and legacy ==
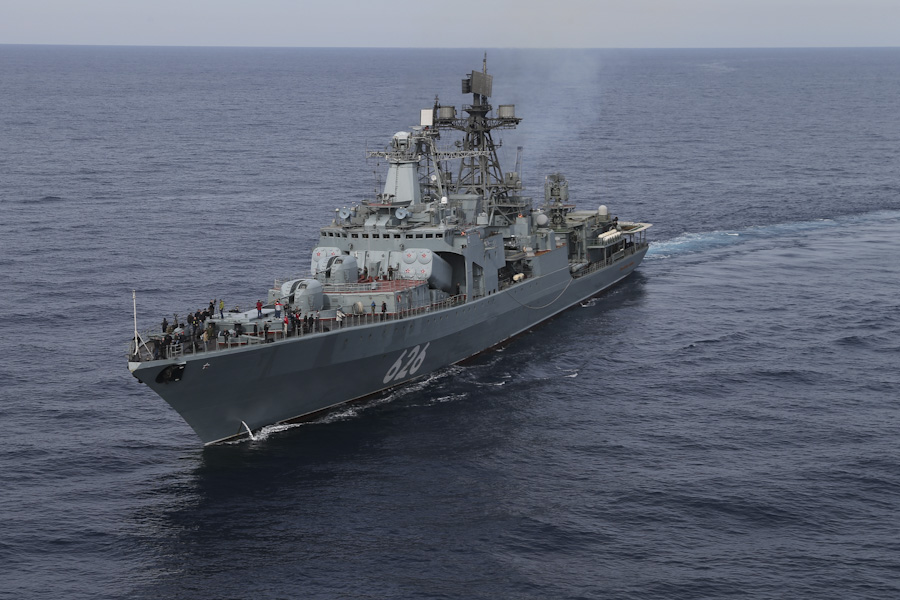
Kulakov's namesake, the Udaloy-class destroyer Vice-Admiral Kulakov, underway in 2016

In addition to being awarded Hero of the Soviet Union, Kulakov was twice awarded the Order of Lenin, in 1942 and again in 1965, received two Orders of the Red Banner, in 1944 and 1953, the Order of Nakhimov, 1st Degree in 1945, and the Order of the Red Star in 1947. He also received various medals, and a ceremonial weapon in 1958. A memorial plaque to Kulakov was installed on the building of the Kiev Higher Vocational School of Railway Transport where he had studied, and a street in Sevastopol was named after him. He was further honoured after his death with the naming of the Udaloy-class destroyer Vice-Admiral Kulakov, launched in 1980. His writings include Life of the Fleet/Guardian of the Baltic (Russian: Жизнь флоту/Страж Балтики, Zhizn flotu/Strazh Baltiki – 1963), 250 Days in the Fire (Russian: 250 дней в огне, 250 dnei v ogne – 1965), and his posthumously published memoirs Entrusted to the Fleet (Russian: Доверено флоту, Dovereno flotu – 1985).
