= Aleksandr Chernyshyov =

Russian electrical engineer

- Александр Чернышёв
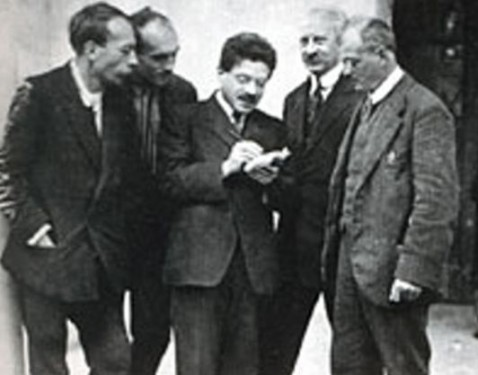
- Left to right: I. V. Obreimov, N. N. Semyonov, P. Ehrenfest, A. F. Joffe, A. A. Chernyshyov, in 1924
- Born: 21 August 1882; Moscow, RSFSR
- Died: 28 April 1940 (aged 57); Moscow, Russia
- Resting place: Bogoslovskoe Cemetery
- Education: Saint Petersburg Polytechnical Institute
- Occupation: Scientist
- Employer(s): Saint Petersburg Polytechnical Institute; Ioffe Institute
- Awards: Lenin Prize
- Scientific career
- Fields: Electrical engineering, Broadcast engineering
- Notable students: Nikolay Devyatkov

Aleksandr Alekseyevich Chernyshyov (Russian: Александр Андреевич Чернышёв; 21 August 1882 – 28 April 1940), anglicised Alexander Chernyshov, was an electrical engineer. He graduated from Saint Petersburg Polytechnical Institute in 1907, and worked there until the end of his life. His research consisted of radio engineering and high-voltage techniques. He won the Lenin Prize in 1930.
