= Karlen G. Adamyan =

Armenian cardiologist (1937–2026)

Karlen Adamyan
- Կառլեն Ադամյան
- Born: 19 January 1937; Leninakan, Armenian SSR, USSR
- Died: 28 February 2026 (aged 89)
- Education: Yerevan State Medical University
- Scientific career
- Workplaces: Scientific Research Institute of Cardiology

Karlen Grigori Adamyan (Armenian: Կառլեն Գրիգորի Ադամյան; 19 January 1937 – 28 February 2026) was an Armenian cardiologist who was a Doctor of Medical Sciences (1971), Professor (1985), and Academician of the Armenian National Academy of Sciences (1996).

In 2009, he was named Honoured Science Worker of Armenia.

== Life and career ==
Adamyan was born on 19 January 1937. He graduated from Yerevan State Medical Institute in 1959. From 1962 to 1965, he was a postgraduate student at the Institute of Cardiology and Heart Surgery of Ministry of Health of the ASSR, after which he started working for the same institute. In 1972–1982, he transferred to the atherosclerotic cardiovascular disease department. In 1979, he became the director of Yerevan Research Institute of Cardiology. In 1995, he became the Head of the Chair of Clinical Cardiology of the National Institute of Health, as well as filled the position of Chief Cardiologist at the Ministry of Health of Armenia (1979–2001).

He was the author of 497 scientific papers, and 10 monographs.

Adamyan was credited with developing the functional heart failure concept in cases of atherosclerotic cardiovascular disease and birth defects and for suggesting the classification of the pre-cyclone stage of circulatory collapse. He introduced the biomedicine and immunology directions in clinical cardiology. His main research was in the fields of primary and secondary prevention of pulmonary hypertension and cardiac ischemic disease.

Adamyan died on 28 February 2026, at the age of 89.

== Awards and recognitions ==
- Medal after Mkhitar Heratsi,
- Order of Friendship of nations, gold medal after Evgeniy Chazov (2007),
- Gold anniversary medal of National Health Institute of Armenia (2007),
- Gold medal of meria of Yerevan city administration (2011),
- Special diploma of presidium of Russian Society of Cardiology for development of cardiology (one of the tree diplomas with Yevgeniy Chazov and Rafael Oganov).
- State Prize of the Armenian SSR in sphere of science and technology (1988)
