= Sergey Izotov =

Soviet scientist

Sergey Petrovich Izotov (Russian: Серге́й Петро́вич Изо́тов; 30 June 1917 – 6 May 1983) was a Soviet scientist and designer of aircraft engines.

== Biography ==
Izotov was a Chief and General Designer (1960–1983) of OKB-117 later became the NPO named after V. I. Klimov where Izotov was also the General Designer. Hero of Socialist Labour (1969) and winner of Lenin Prize (1978), Stalin Prize first degree (1949) and the USSR State Prize (1971).

Izotov was Doctor of Technical Sciences (1968) and Merited Engineering Scientist of the RSFSR. He was the author of 30 scientific papers and 13 inventions.

He was awarded a title of Freeman of the city of Rzeszów (Poland). Delegate of the 26th Congress of the Communist Party of the Soviet Union.

== Sources ==
- Зелин, Александр, ed. (2009). "ИЗОТОВ Сергей Петрович". Авиация России : биографическая энциклопедия : 1909-2009 [Aviation of Russia : Biographical Encyclopaedia : 1909-2009] (in Russian). Москва: Столичная энциклопедия. 221. ISBN 978-5-903989-03-4.
