= Vitaly Bianki =

Russian writer (1894–1959)

- Soviet writer Vitaly Bianki in 1938
- Born: 30 January 1894 St. Petersburg, Russian Empire
- Died: 28 May 1959 (aged 65) Leningrad, USSR
- Occupation: Writer, teacher
- Genre: Natural history Children's literature

Vitaly Valentinovich Bianki (Russian: Вита́лий Валенти́нович Биа́нки; 11 February 1894, St. Petersburg — 10 June 1959, Leningrad) was a popular Russian children's writer and a prolific author of books on nature.

== Early life ==
Bianki's father was Valentin Bianchi (1857–1920), an ornithologist and curator at the Zoological Museum of the Russian Academy of Sciences. His three sons were at home in its halls. On a summer vacation, Vitaly Bianchi went on his first forestry trip and became a passionate outdoorsman. He graduated from the Natural Science Department of the Physical and Mathematical Faculty of Petrograd University in 1916 with a specialisation in ornithology, as well as studies in art at the St. Petersburg Art Institute to assist with the drawing of plants and animals.

Bianchi served in the army in 1916 and joined the Socialist-Revolutionary Party in 1917. In 1917 moved to Biysk, where he was forced into the Kolchak army. He deserted and lived under a false name, "Vitaly Belyanin" until the eventual expulsion of the Kolchak regime. His double name Bianki-Belyanin, remained on his passport until the end of his life. He worked for the Commission for the Protection of Monuments of Tsarskoye Selo, and was sent in spring 1918 to Siberia and the Volga, where he worked in the summer of 1918 in Samara for the newspaper People ("Народ").

After the Soviets came to power, Bianki worked in Biysk in the Department of Education at a regional museum where he served as director. He also worked as a school teacher for Comintern III. He was arrested twice in 1921, and in fear of further arrest, he moved his family in 1922 to Petrograd.

== Career ==
Bianki participated in scientific expeditions on the Volga, Altai Krai, Urals and Kazakhstan and brought back copious scientific notes, about which he wrote: "They were lying like a dead weight on my soul. They - as at the Zoological Museum - has been meeting the many dead animals in the dry record of facts, it was a forest, animals stagnation of immobility, no birds flew and did not sing. Then again, as in childhood, painfully wanted to find a word that would revive them magically compelled to come to life."

In 1923, Bianki began to publish a natural calendar in the Leningrad magazine Sparrow (later New Robinson). This publication became a prototype of his later Forest newspapers every year (1927). In those years, he became associated with a literary club, where writers of children's literature gathered. This included the writers Chukovsky, Zhitkov and Marshak. Soon afterwards, his story "The Red Sparrow Travelling" was published in the magazine Sparrow. Bianki's first published book for children was titled Whose nose is better? (1923). His voluminous Forest Newspaper for Every Year (1st edition, 1928) is a peculiar encyclopedia of forest life and forest inhabitants.

At the end of 1925, Bianki was arrested again on suspicion of subversive activity and sentenced to three years of exile in Uralsk. In the spring of 1928, he was released to return to Leningrad. In November 1932 was arrested again, but was released after three and a half weeks for lack of evidence. In March 1935, he was arrested as an "active member of the armed uprising against Soviet rule" and taken to the Aktobe region, but was released after intercession by Maxim Gorky's ex-wife, Yekaterina Peshkova. In 1941, he returned to Leningrad. Because of poor health, he was not drafted to serve in the army for World War II, but was evacuated to the Urals. After the war he returned again to Leningrad.

The body of his work consists of over three hundred short stories, fairy tales, stories, and articles, which make up 120 books. One of his students and followers was Nikolai Sladkov, an author of books about nature.

== Death ==
Vitali Bianki died in Leningrad and was buried in the Bogoslovskoe Cemetery.

== Selected works for children ==
- Anyutka's duck
- Water horse
- Where crayfish winter
- Eyes and ears
- Green pond
- As the little antz to home hurried
- As I wanted to fill to a hare of salt on a tail
- Red hill
- Who than sings?
- Kuzyar the chipmunk and Inoyka the bear
- Little cuckoo
- Forest houses
- Forest scouts
- Lyulya
- Max
- Little mouse Pik
- Heavenly elephant
- Orange neck
- First hunting
- Sundew — mosquito's death
- The fish house (in a co-authorship with Anna Akimkina)
- Snow book
- Owl
- Little terem
- Terentiy the black grouse
- T ails
- Whose nose is better?
- Whose it is feet?
