= Ivan Ivanov (mathematician) =

Russian-Soviet mathematician

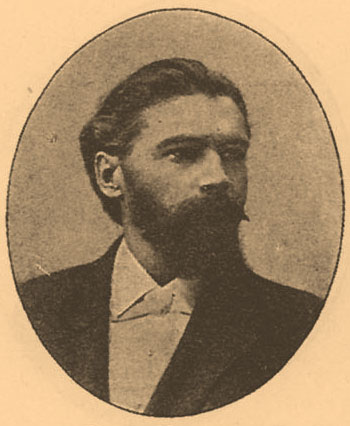

Ivan Ivanovich Ivanov (Russian: Иван Иванович Иванов; 11 August 1862 – 17 December 1939) was a Russian-Soviet mathematician who worked in the field of number theory. Together with Georgy Voronoy he continued Pafnuty Chebyshev's work on the subject.

== Life and work ==
Ivanov was born in Saint Petersburg, Russia. He finished his studies in mathematics at Saint Petersburg University with his candidate thesis, "About prime numbers". In 1891 there followed his master thesis "integral complex numbers", and in 1901 his doctoral thesis, "About some questions in connection with the number of prime numbers".

Starting in 1891, Ivanov lectured at St. Petersburg University; from 1896, he lectured at the women's university, and after 1902 at Saint Petersburg Polytechnical University.

In 1924 Ivanov was elected corresponding member of the Russian Academy of Sciences.
