= Leon Orbeli =

Armenian physiologist (1882–1958)

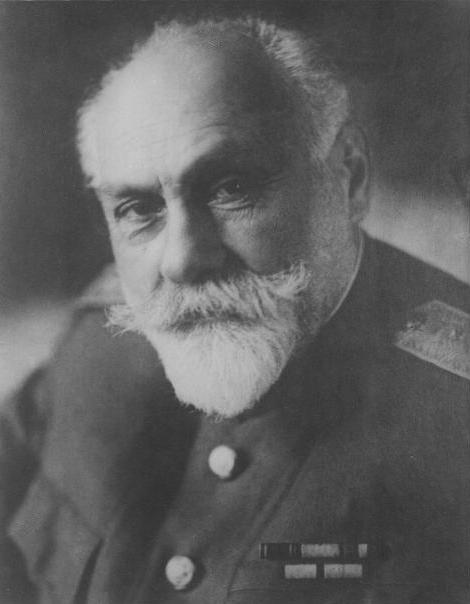
- Orbeli in 1945
- Born: 7 July [O.S. 25 June] 1882; Tsaghkadzor, Tiflis Governorate, Russian Empire
- Died: 9 December 1958 (aged 76); Leningrad, Russian SFSR, Soviet Union
- Resting place: Bogoslovskoe Cemetery, Saint Petersburg
- Awards: Hero of Socialist Labour

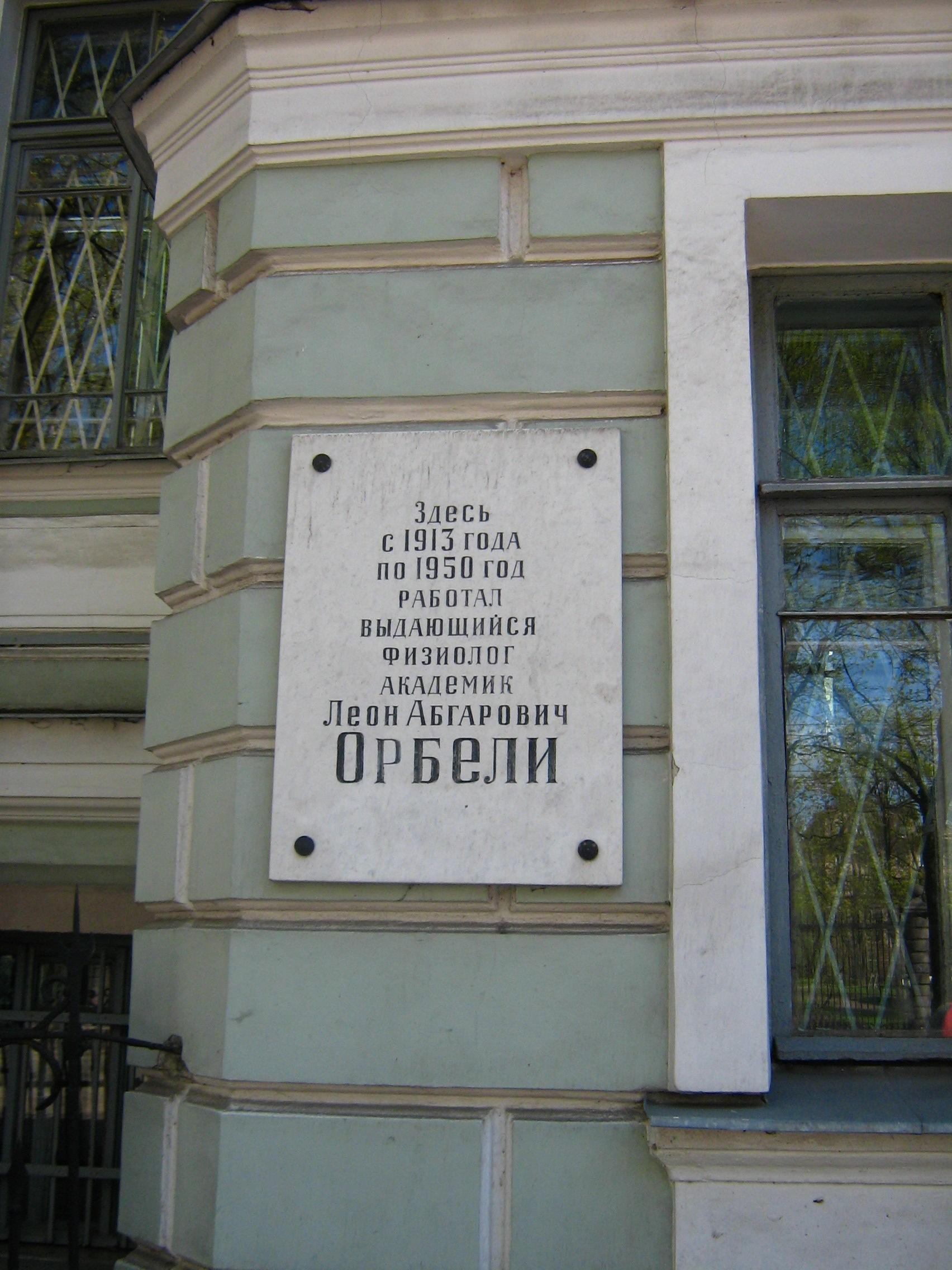
A commemorative plaque to Leon Orbeli in Saint Petersburg

Leon Abgarovich Orbeli (Armenian: Լևոն Աբգարի Օրբելի, romanized: Levon Abgari Orbeli; Russian: Леон Абгарович Орбели, romanized: Levon Abgarovich Orbeli; 7 July [O.S. 25 June] 1882 – 9 December 1958) was an Armenian physiologist active in the Russian SFSR. He was a member of the Academy of Sciences of the Soviet Union and Armenian National Academy of Sciences (the latter was founded by his brother Joseph Orbeli). Leon Orbeli became the director of the Institute of Physiology in 1950.

Orbeli played an important part in the development of evolutionary physiology and wrote more than 200 works on experimental and theoretical science, 130 of them journal articles.

== Career ==
Leon Orbeli was born in Tsaghkadzor, Russian Empire. He graduated from the Gymnasium in Tbilisi in 1899 and entered the Imperial Military Medical Academy in Saint Petersburg. While still a student in the second course he began to work in the laboratory of Ivan Pavlov. For the next thirty-five years, Orbeli's life and scientific career were closely connected with the work of Pavlov.

Orbeli graduated from the Military Medical Academy in 1904 and became an intern at the Nikolai Hospital in Kronstadt, the Naval Hospital in Saint Petersburg. This gave him the opportunity to continue his experimental research in Pavlov's laboratory.

Orbeli's scientific career was spent in the leading Russian physiological centres, and he joined Pavlov in 1907, at the very height of Pavlov's research on conditioned reflexes. He was Pavlov's assistant in the Department of Physiology at the Institute for Experimental Medicine from 1907 to 1920.

From 1918–1946, he was head of the Department for Physiology of the State Institute for Science Research P. F. Lesgaft, located at the Petrograd Scientific Institute in the Biological Station in Koltushi. Orbeli was professor of physiology at the First Leningrad Medical Institute from 1920 to 1931, and from 1925 to 1950 professor of physiology at the Military Medical Academy. He was head of the latter from 1943 to 1950.

Orbeli worked for two years abroad, with Ewald Hering (1834–1918) in Germany, John Newport Langley (1852–1925) and Joseph Barcroft (1872–1947) in England, and at the Marine Biological Station in Naples. After Pavlov's death in 1936, Orbeli, now Russia's most prominent scientist, was appointed director of the Pavlov Institute. From 1939 to 1946 he was secretary to the Department of Biological Science and vice president of the Academy of Sciences of the Soviet Union.

In 1956, Orbeli organized the I. M. Sechenov Institute of Evolutionary Physiology and headed this institution until 1958. It was later renamed I. M. Sechenov Institute of Evolutionary Physiology and Biochemistry of the Academy of Sciences of the Soviet Union. In 1935 he was elected an active member of the Academy of Sciences of the Soviet Union. In 1945 he was awarded the title of Hero of Socialist Labour. He held the rank of colonel general.
