= Joseph Orbeli =

Armenian medieval historian (1887–1961)

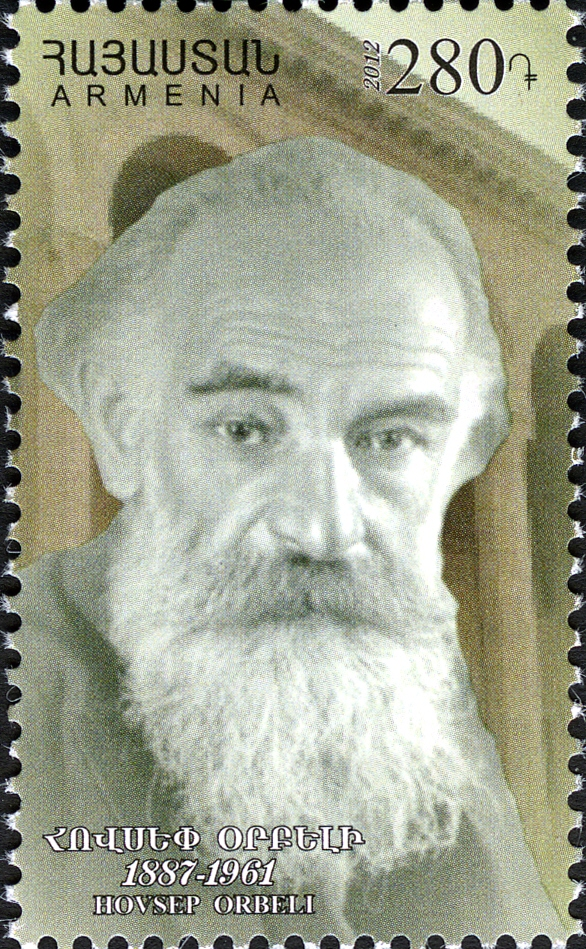
- A 2012 Armenian stamp dedicated to Orbeli
- Born: 20 March 1887; Kutaisi, Russian Empire
- Died: 2 February 1961 (aged 73); Leningrad, Soviet Union
- Awards: Order of Lenin (2); Order of the Red Banner of Labour (2)

Academic background
- Education: Leningrad State University
- Influences: Nicholas Adontz, Vasily Bartold, Ivane Javakhishvili, Nikolai Marr, Michael Rostovtzeff, Sergei Zhebelev

Academic work
- Discipline: Armenian studies, Iranian studies, Oriental studies
- Institutions: Armenian National Academy of Sciences
- Doctoral students: Aram Ter-Ghevondyan
- Influenced: Hrach Bartikyan, Aram Ter-Ghevondyan, Karen Yuzbashyan

Joseph Orbeli (Armenian: Հովսեփ Աբգարի Օրբելի, Hovsep Abgari Orbeli; Russian: Иосиф Абгарович Орбели, romanized: Iosif Abgarovich Orbeli; 20 March (O.S. 8 March) 1887 – 2 February 1961) was a Soviet-Armenian orientalist, public figure and academician who specialized in medieval history of Transcaucasia and administered the Hermitage Museum in Leningrad from 1934 to 1951. He was the founder and first president of the Armenian National Academy of Sciences (1943–47).

== Biography ==
=== Early life and education ===
Born into the Orbeli family in Kutaisi, Russian Georgia in 1887, Joseph Orbeli completed his secondary education at a classical gymnasium in Tbilisi. In 1904, he was accepted to Saint Petersburg University. He studied history and philology (with a particular emphasis in Latin and Greek) and graduated from the university in 1911.

During his student years, Orbeli accompanied his professor, Nikolai Marr, to Russian Armenia, where he took part in excavations of the ruins of the medieval Armenian capital of Ani. Marr pushed his pupil to fully immerse himself in the fields of archaeology, literature, lithography and linguistics; otherwise, Marr reasoned, he would find himself unprepared in his research and his studies.

=== Archaeological studies ===
Following his graduation, Orbeli departed for Armenia once more. He became the director of an on-site museum that was established at Ani and, during Marr's absences, frequently headed the excavations himself. He also traveled to Nagorno-Karabakh (more precisely, to the historical region of the Principality of Khachen), gathering and categorizing lithographic material. Orbeli also managed to travel to Western Armenia, where he was able to study Armenian, Seljuk, and Urartian monuments and conduct research on Armenian and Kurdish dialects.

Gradually, Orbeli was emerging as the leading authority on Armenian antiquities in the world. In 1912, he became a member of the Imperial Russian Archaeological Society and in 1914, he began teaching Armenian and Kurdish studies at Saint Petersburg University. In 1916, he participated in a Russian archaeological expedition around the Lake Van region; it was here where he discovered an inscription attributed to the Urartian king Sarduri II.

He continued his work at Saint Petersburg University; in 1917, he was appointed an assistant professor of Armenian-Georgian studies, but occasionally taught at Moscow's Lazarev Institute of Oriental Languages as well.

=== Academic work ===
In the years leading up to the Russian Revolution, Orbeli published a number of books, including a catalogue of artifacts found at Ani and a series of studies dealing with classical philology, Armenian history, archaeology and art. This led to his appointment to the Hermitage Museum in July 1934, which he would steer through the hardships of Joseph Stalin's purges. In 1948, Orbeli accepted paintings from the former Sergei Schukin and Ivan Morozov collections which were transferred to Hermitage Museum in Leningrad after the liquidation State Museum of New Western Art according to the Council of Ministers's Decree No. 672 signed by Stalin.

In December 1941, the deadliest month of the Siege of Leningrad, Orbeli led a festival dedicated to Ali-Shir Nava'i, a medieval Turkic poet and philosopher. Orbeli considerably enhanced the museum's holdings of Oriental art, making it one of the top Oriental art museums in the world. No less important was Orbeli's role as head of the national school of Caucasus studies. Orbeli underscored the importance of linguistic studies for proper understanding of historical processes.

In 1934, as a member of the Soviet delegation, he went to Iran for the Ferdowsi millennial celebrations and visited the cities of Tehran and Mashhad. A year later he organised the 3rd International Congress of Iranian Art and Archeology at the Hermitage Museum and the accompanying exhibition therein. The other spiritus movens of the congress was Arthur Upham Pope.

In 1955–60, he was in charge of the Faculty of Oriental Studies at the renamed Leningrad University.

=== Later life ===
He was buried at Bogoslovskoe Cemetery in Leningrad. He was featured in the movie Russian Ark as the director of the Hermitage.

=== In stamps ===
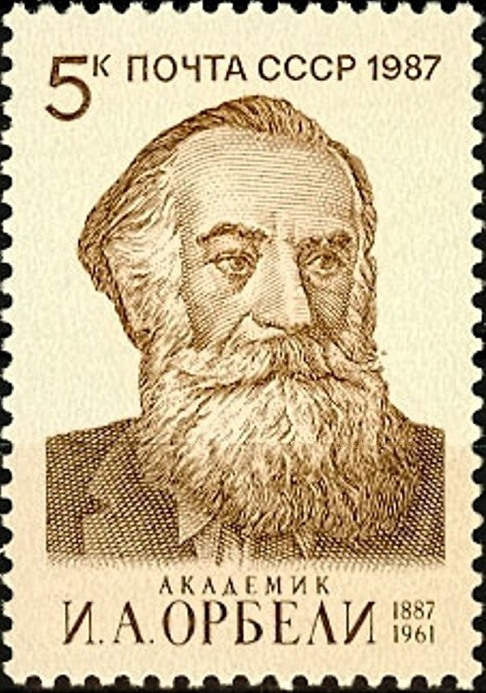
Orbeli on a 1987 Soviet stamp

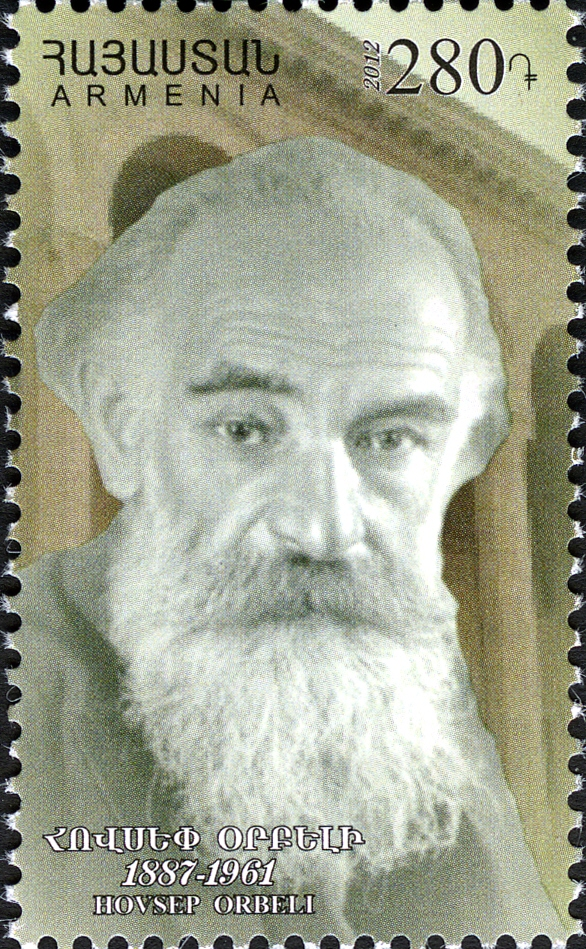
Joseph Orbeli on an Armenian stamp, 2012

== Select bibliography ==
- (in Russian) Избранные Труды [Selected works]. Yerevan: Armenian Academy of Sciences, 1963.
- (in Russian) "Akademik Iosif Abgarovich Orbeli: (biograficheskiy ocherk" [The academician Joseph Abgarovich Orbeli: a biographical essay], pp. [5]-12 in: Strube V. V. (red). Issledovaniia po istorii kul'tury narodov Bostoka: sbornik v chest' akademika I. A. Orbeli. Moskva Leningrad. Izdatel'stvo Akademiii Nauk SSSR, 1960, 527 p.
