= Armenian National Academy of Sciences =

National learned society of Armenia

National Academy of Sciences of Armenia
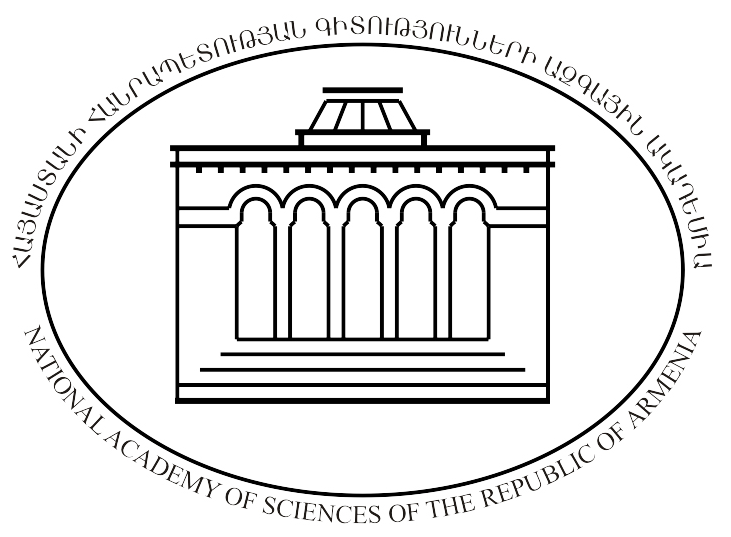
- Official logo of the academy
- Established: 10 November 1943; 82 years ago
- President: Ashot Saghyan
- Staff: 3,700 (63 academicians, 61 corresponding members, 335 doctors of sciences, 1,080 candidates of sciences)
- Formerly called: Armenian Academy of Sciences
- Address: 24 Baghramyan Avenue, Yerevan, Armenia
- Coordinates: 40°11′30″N 44°30′31″E
- Interactive map of National Academy of Sciences of Armenia
- Website: https://www.sci.am/

The National Academy of Sciences of the Republic of Armenia (NAS RA) (Armenian: Հայաստանի Հանրապետության գիտությունների ազգային ակադեմիա, ՀՀ ԳԱԱ, Hayastani Hanrapetut’yan gitut’yunneri azgayin akademia) is the Armenian national academy, functioning as the primary body that conducts research and coordinates activities in the fields of science and social sciences in Armenia. It is a member of the International Science Council.

== History ==
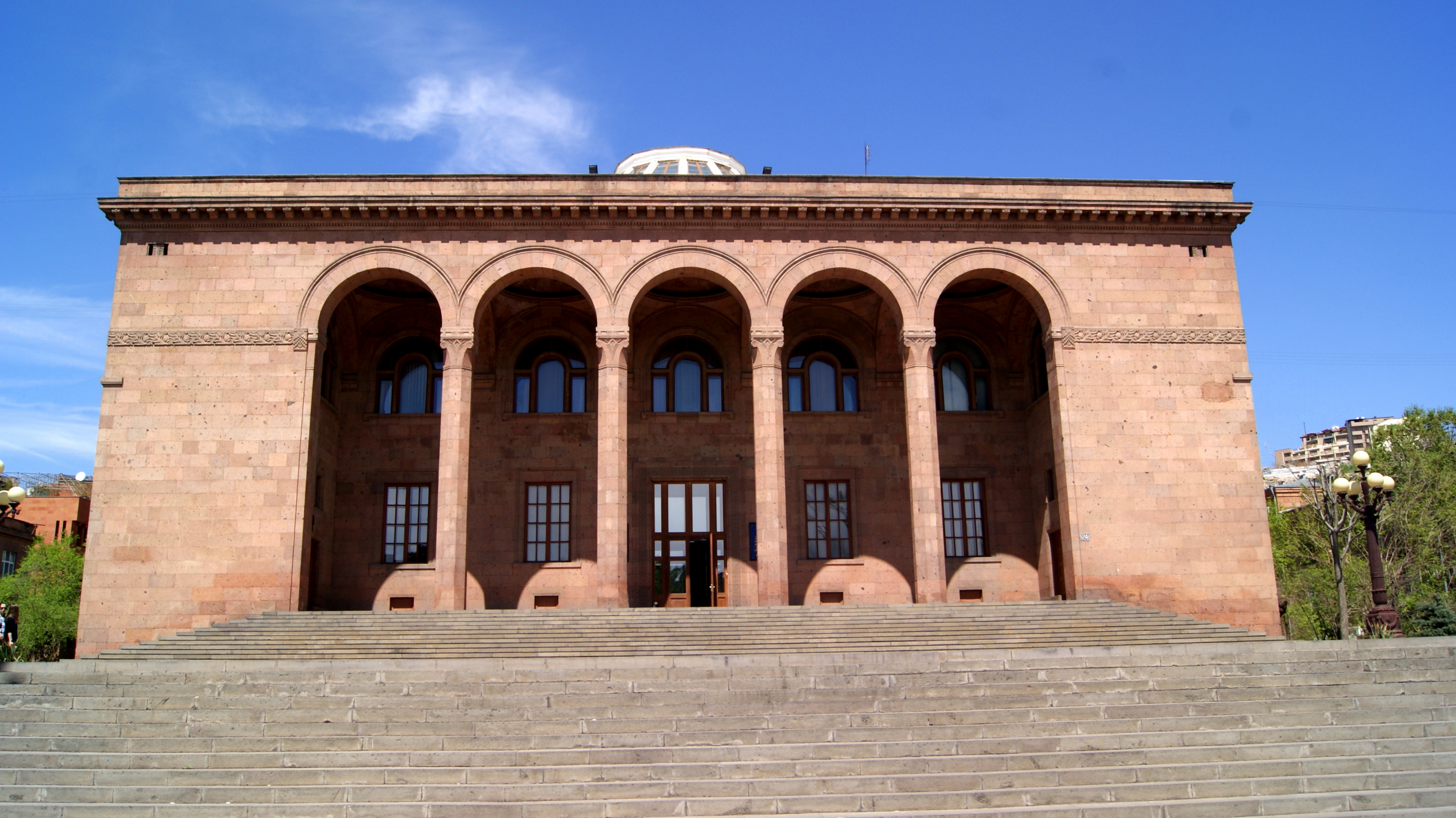
The Armenian Academy of Sciences

Yerevan State University, which temporarily operated from Alexandropol starting in 1919, served as the Republic's initial hub for cultural, educational, and scientific activities. During Armenia's First Republic period, the University conducted research across cultural, historical, and economic fields.

Following the establishment of the Second Republic in 1921, a cultural and historical research institute was founded in Etchmiadzin, later reorganized in 1925 as an institution focused on advancing studies in natural sciences, technical fields, and humanities. Additional research facilities emerged during this period, covering areas such as plant conservation, construction materials, geological studies, therapeutic mineral waters, seismic monitoring, and various other scientific disciplines. These separate research organizations were consolidated in 1935 to form the Armenian division of the Soviet Academy of Sciences, with Franz Julievich Levinson-Lessing serving as its first director.

By 1938, Hovsep Orbeli had become the branch's leading scientist. The institution expanded its scope across physics, mathematics, natural sciences, engineering, and humanities, establishing Armenia as a significant center for Armenian scholarship.

The Academy of Sciences of the Armenian Soviet Socialist Republic was then founded on 10 November 1943, on the basis of the Armenian Branch of the Soviet Academy of Sciences, which was established almost ten years earlier, in 1935. Among its founders were Joseph Orbeli, Stepan Malkhasyants, Ivan Gevorkian and Victor Ambartsumian. Orbeli became the first president of the academy.

After the Third Republic was declared in 1992, the Academy of Sciences was restructured and given its current name as the National Academy of Sciences of the Republic of Armenia. Fadey Sarkisian became the Academy's President in 1993. His tenure brought important institutional changes focused on maintaining the Academy's viability, including adoption of legislation governing scientific and technical research activities. During this period, the Academy gained official advisory status to the government.

Radik Martirosian, an accomplished radiophysics researcher, assumed the presidency in 2006. He was succeeded by Ashot Saghyan, who was elected to lead the organization in 2021.

The nation commemorated the centennial birthday of V.A. Ambartsumian in 2008, honoring the distinguished scientist who had served as the Academy's President for nearly fifty years. An international award bearing his name was created two years later in 2010.

To better connect fundamental research with practical applications and maximize the institution's scientific capabilities, new legislation was developed at the President's direction and passed by the National Assembly in April 2011.

Today, the Academy advances multiple scientific disciplines while maintaining productive relationships with universities, government agencies, and international research organizations. It participates in various global initiatives, including several European Union programs such as H2020 BSH, EaP PLUS, and EEN Armenia, along with the COSME EEN Armenia project.

As the country's primary state research body, the National Academy encompasses over 34 scientific institutions and related organizations, all coordinated through its governing Presidium.

== International Relations ==
The Armenian National Academy of Sciences has signed memorandums of understanding, agreements of understanding on scientific cooperation, and cooperation in the field of science and technology with more than 150 established scientific academic centers, universities, and other organizations. The most relevant institutions are listed below:

- International Associations of Academies of Sciences (since 1993)
- International Council for Science (ICS)
- Alliance of International Science Organizations (ANSO)
- European Federation of Academies of Sciences (ALLEA) (since 2012)
- The Russian Academy of Sciences (since 1993)
- The National Academy of Sciences of Ukraine (since 1993)
- The University of Warsaw, Poland (since 2024)
- The Spanish National Research Council (since 2024)
- The National Academy of Sciences of Republic of Belarus (since 1995)
- The Academy of Sciences of Turkmenistan (since 1995)
- The National Academy of Sciences of Georgia (since 1997)
- The Academy of Sciences of Lithuania (since 2012)
- The Academy of Sciences of Romania (since 2013)
- The National Center of Scientific Research, France (CNRS) (since 2009)
- The Chinese Academy of Sciences (since 1998)
- The Academy of Sciences of Moldova (since 2013)
- The Austrian Academy of Sciences (since 2017)
- The Chinese Academy of Social Sciences (since 2017)
- The Indian Academy of Sciences (since 2002)
- The Southern Scientific Center, RAS (since 2004)

The full list of international cooperation agreements are given on the Armenian National Academy of Science's website.

== Presidents ==
- Joseph Orbeli (1943–1947)
- Viktor Ambartsumian (1947–1993)
- Fadey Sargsyan (1993–2006)
- Radik Martirosyan (2006–2021)
- Ashot Saghyan (2021-present)

== Structure ==
Division of Mathematical and Technical Sciences

- Institute of Mathematics
- Institute of Mechanics
- Institute for Informatics and Automation Problems

Division of Physics and Astrophysics

- Byurakan Astrophysical Observatory
- Institute of Radiophysics & Electronics
- Institute of Applied Problems of Physics
- Institute for Physical Research

Division of Natural Sciences

- Center for Ecological Noosphere Studies
- Institute of Biochemistry
- Institute of Botany
- G.S.Davtyan Institute of Hydroponics Problems
- Scientific and Production Center Armbiotechnology
- Institute of Biotechnology Scientific and Production Center "Armbiotechnology"
- "Institute of Microbiology" Scientific and Production Center "Armbiotechnology"
- Division of Natural Sciences Microbial Depository Center
- Institute of Molecular Biology
- Institute of Physiology
- Scientific Center of Zoology and Hydroecology
- Scientific Center of Zoology and Hydroecology- Institute of Zoology
- Scientific Center of Zoology and Hydroecology- Institute of Hydroecology and Ichthyology

Division of Chemistry and Earth Sciences

- Scientific Technological Center of Organic and Pharmaceutical Chemistry
- Institute of Fine Organic Chemistry of Scientific - Technological Center of Organic and Pharmaceutical Chemistry
- Institute of Organic Chemistry of Scientific - Technological Center of Organic and Pharmaceutical Chemistry
- Molecular Structure Research Center of Scientific - Technological Center of Organic and Pharmaceutical Chemistry
- Institute of Chemical Physics
- Institute of General and Inorganic Chemistry
- Institute of Geological Sciences
- Institute of Geophysics and Engineering Seismology after A. Nazarov

Division of Armenology and Social Sciences

- Institute of History
- Institute of Philosophy and Law
- M. Kotanyan Institute of Economics
- Institute of Archaeology and Ethnography
- Institute of Oriental Studies
- H. Acharian Institute of Language
- M. Abeghyan Institute of Literature
- Institute of Art
- Museum-Institute of Genocide
- Shirak Armenology Research Center
- Armenian Encyclopedia Publishing House
- All Armenian Foundation Financing Armenological Studies

== See also ==
- Education in Armenia
- Karlen G. Adamyan
