= John N. Martin =

American philosopher

- Born: San Francisco, California, U.S.

Education
- Education: University of California, Davis (A.B.); University of Toronto (M.A., Ph.D.)
- Thesis: Sortal presupposition: a study of category mistakes, their logic and importance (1973)
- Doctoral advisor: Bas van Fraassen

Philosophical work
- Era: Contemporary philosophy
- Region: Western philosophy
- School: Analytic philosophy
- Institutions: University of Cincinnati; University of Toronto
- Main interests: Formal semantics, history of logic, many-valued logic, philosophical logic, philosophy of language, environmental ethics
- Notable works: Elements of Formal Semantics; Themes in Neoplatonic and Aristotelian Logic; The Cartesian Semantics of the Port Royal Logic

John N. Martin is an American philosopher and logician. He is McMicken Professor Emeritus in the Department of Philosophy at the University of Cincinnati. His research has focused on formal semantics, the history of logic, many-valued logic, philosophical linguistics, ancient and medieval logic, early modern logic, and environmental ethics.

Martin is the author of Elements of Formal Semantics: An Introduction to Logic for Students of Language, Themes in Neoplatonic and Aristotelian Logic: Order, Negation and Abstraction, and The Cartesian Semantics of the Port Royal Logic. His work on the Port-Royal Logic has been discussed in scholarly reviews in Notre Dame Philosophical Reviews, The International Journal of the Platonic Tradition, British Journal for the History of Philosophy, History and Philosophy of Logic, and Metascience.

== Early life and education ==
Martin was born in San Francisco, California. He received an A.B. in philosophy from the University of California, Davis in 1968, an M.A. in philosophy from the University of Toronto in 1970, and a Ph.D. in philosophy from the University of Toronto in 1973.

His doctoral dissertation, completed under the direction of Bas van Fraassen, was titled Sortal presupposition: a study of category mistakes, their logic and importance.

== Academic career ==
Martin taught philosophy at the University of Toronto before joining the University of Cincinnati in 1973. At Cincinnati, he became associate professor in 1979 and full professor in 1986. He served as head of the Department of Philosophy from 1991 to 1994 and later became professor emeritus. The University of Cincinnati Research Directory identifies him as McMicken Professor Emeritus and lists his areas of specialization as formal semantics, history of logic, and environmental ethics.

Martin's professional activities have included membership in the Association for Symbolic Logic and the American Philosophical Association, editorial and refereeing work for journals in logic and philosophy, and service connected with Environmental Ethics. He was review editor of Environmental Ethics and director of Environmental Philosophy, Inc., from 1978 to 1986, and later served on the journal's editorial board from 1993 to 1999.

== Research ==
Martin's early research addressed formal semantics, presupposition, many-valued logic, category mistakes, and the semantics of natural language. His 1987 book Elements of Formal Semantics: An Introduction to Logic for Students of Language was published by Academic Press. The book was reviewed by Stephen D. Spangehl in the journal Language in 1989.

In the 1990s and 2000s, Martin turned increasingly to ancient, medieval, and Neoplatonic logic. His work in this area included studies of Aristotle, Proclus, Boethius, William of Ockham, privative negation, abstraction, and the logical structure of Neoplatonic metaphysics. His book Themes in Neoplatonic and Aristotelian Logic: Order, Negation and Abstraction was published by Ashgate in 2004.

== Port-Royal Logic ==
Martin has written extensively on the Port-Royal Logic, the seventeenth-century logic text by Antoine Arnauld and Pierre Nicole. His published work on the topic includes studies of existential import, distributive terms, truth, privative negation, the structure of ideas, and extension in the Port-Royal Logic.

His monograph The Cartesian Semantics of the Port Royal Logic was published by Routledge in the series Routledge Studies in Seventeenth-Century Philosophy. The book examines the semantics of the Port-Royal Logic in relation to Cartesianism, intentional content, signification, extension, truth conditions, syllogistic theory, and medieval supposition theory.

In Notre Dame Philosophical Reviews, Eric Stencil described the book as a study of the Port-Royal Logic's metatheory and semantic theory, with chapters devoted to the semantics of terms, discourse, propositions, method, and existential import. Stencil noted that Martin treats the Port-Royal Logic as an attempt to reconcile Cartesianism with traditional logic rather than as a simple rejection of medieval logic. The book also received reviews by Eyjólfur Kjalar Emilsson in The International Journal of the Platonic Tradition, Mihnea Dobre in British Journal for the History of Philosophy, Elodie Cassan in History and Philosophy of Logic, and Benjamin Hill in Metascience.

== Environmental ethics and teaching ==
In addition to his work in logic and semantics, Martin has taught and written in environmental ethics. His article "The Concept of the Irreplaceable" appeared in Environmental Ethics in 1979, and "Order Theoretic Properties of Holistic Ethical Theories" appeared in the same journal in 1991. According to a University of Cincinnati retirement tribute written by Christopher Gauker, Martin was one of the early faculty members to incorporate computers into logic pedagogy and regularly taught courses in logic, semantics, medieval philosophy, rationalist philosophy, environmental ethics, the philosophy of education, and the ethics of war.

Martin's 2026 textbook An Introduction to Logic for Liberal Arts Students is an introductory logic text for philosophy majors and liberal arts students that emphasizes the history and philosophy of logic. According to the book description, the textbook differs from many standard introductory logic texts by organizing its material in three historically framed parts: the logic of terms, the logic of propositions, and the logic of arguments. The description states that the book introduces students to the history of logic and its philosophical importance, in addition to topics in syllogistic, propositional, and first-order logic.

== Selected publications ==
=== Books ===
Martin, John N. (1987). Elements of Formal Semantics: An Introduction to Logic for Students of Language. Orlando: Academic Press. ISBN 978-0-12-474856-9. Martin, John N. (2004). Themes in Neoplatonic and Aristotelian Logic: Order, Negation and Abstraction. Aldershot: Ashgate. ISBN 978-0-7546-0811-0. Martin, John N. (2019). The Cartesian Semantics of the Port Royal Logic. Routledge Studies in Seventeenth-Century Philosophy. Routledge. doi:10.4324/9781351249195. ISBN 978-1-351-24919-5. Martin, John N. (2026). An Introduction to Logic for Liberal Arts Students. Newcastle upon Tyne: Cambridge Scholars Publishing. ISBN 978-1-0364-7620-5.

== Articles and chapters ==
=== Selected articles and chapters ===
- "A Syntactic Characterization of Kleene's Strong Connectives with Two Designated Values."
- "Facts and the Semantics of Gerunds."
- "A Many-Valued Semantics for Category Mistakes."
- "The Concept of the Irreplaceable."
- "Facts and Events as Semantic Constructs."
- "Negation, Ambiguity, and the Identity Test."
- "Epistemic Semantics for Classical and Intuitionistic Logic."
- "The Semantics of Frege's Grundgesetze."
- "A Tense Logic for Boethius."
- "Order Theoretic Properties of Holistic Ethical Theories."
- "Existence, Negation, and Abstraction in the Neoplatonic Hierarchy."
- "Should Logic Satisfy the Humanities Requirement."
- "Aristotle's Natural Deduction Reconsidered."
- "Proclus and the Neoplatonic Syllogistic."
- "Łukasiewicz's Many-Valued Logic and Neoplatonic Scalar Modality."
- "All Brutes are Subhuman: Aristotle and Ockham on Privative Negation."
- "The Lover of the Beautiful and the Good: Platonic Foundations of Aesthetic and Moral Value."
- "A History of Satisfiability," with John Franco.
- "Existential Import in Cartesian Semantics."
- "Existential Commitment and The Cartesian Semantics of the Port Royal Logic."
- "Distributive Terms, Truth, and The Port Royal Logic."
- "Malebranche's Neoplatonic Semantic Theory."
- "Privative Negation in The Port Royal Logic."
- "The Structure of Ideas in The Port Royal Logic."
- "A Note on 'Distributive Terms, Truth, and The Port Royal Logic'."
- "Extension in The Port Royal Logic."
