= Ashot Petrosian =

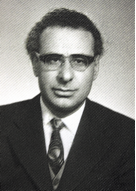
- Ashot Petrosian in 1975
- Born: 2 June 1930; Vardenis, Armenia
- Died: 23 February 1998 (aged 67); Dilijan, Armenia
- Education: Yerevan State University
- Scientific career
- Fields: Mathematics

Ashot Vezirovich Petrosian (Armenian: Աշոտ Վեզիրի Պետրոսյան; June 2, 1930 – February 23, 1998) was a Soviet Armenian mathematician. He completed his PhD in Computational Mathematics in 1964 under the supervision of Julius Anatolyevich Schrader. He was a founding member of the Mergelyan Institute of Mathematical Machines and the Computing Center of the Armenian National Academy of Sciences. He also contributed to the development of several generations of advanced digital computer systems in Armenia, including the Nairi (computer) and ES EVM.

== Biography ==
Ashot V. Petrosian was born in 1930 in a small village near Vardenis, Armenia. He finished high school as a valedictorian in 1949 in Dilijan, Armenia, where his parents settled after escaping the massacre of Armenians in eastern Turkey back in 1915. He went on to study mathematics and graduated with honors from the Yerevan State University, faculty of Physics and Math in 1954. He taught Math courses at the same University until 1955, when he was admitted to Moscow State University to pursue a Ph.D. degree (under supervision of Lazar Lyusternik).

Upon completion of his studies he was offered a position at the Steklov Institute of Mathematics; however, he decided to return to his native country of Armenia. In 1957 he was appointed to serve as a chief engineer and then as a director of Mathematical Division at the Yerevan Computer Research and Development Institute (YCRDI, known as Mergelyan Institute). During his tenure at the YCRDI, the institute became one of the largest producers of computer equipment in the former USSR. He also worked as the vice-principal (1963–65) and principal (1965–70) of the Institute for Informatics and Automation Problems (IIAP), formerly known as the Computing Center of the Armenian National Academy of Sciences. During his scientific career, Prof. Petrosian taught various mathematics courses at the Yerevan State University (1957–78) and at the Yerevan Polytechnic Institute (1978–86). He has authored several textbooks, patents, and monographs in the areas of computational mathematics, algorithmic information theory, automata and discrete mathematics. He has edited five volumes of the Proceedings of the Computing Center of the Armenian National Academy of Sciences and served as a Ph.D. adviser to over 20 post-graduate students, mainly in the Graph Theory field.

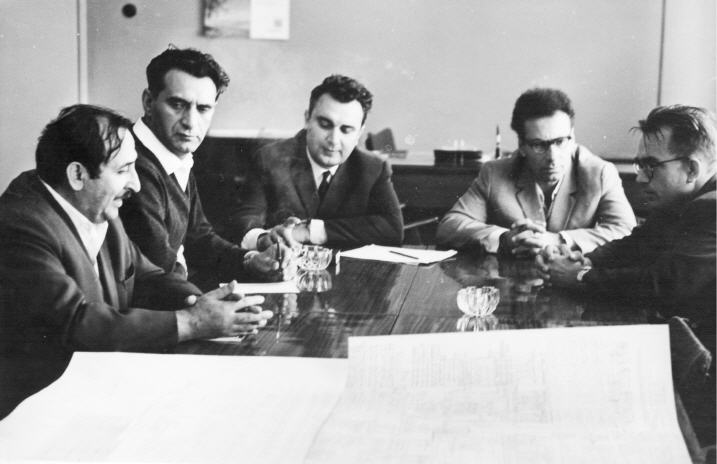
With Sergey Mergelyan (third from left) and Victor Glushkov (right) at the Computing Center of the Armenian Academy of Sciences

== Selected publications ==
- Mathematical Problems of Automation of Digital Computer Design. Izd-vo Akademii nauk Armyanskoi SSR. 1977.
- Petrosian, A.V.; Pasztorne, V.K. (1982). Some problems of a problem-oriented expansion of Boolean functions. Alkalmazott Mat. Lapok.
- Petrosian, A.V.; Vardanyan, V.A. (1983). On complexity of realization of boolean functions with a given activity vector (PDF). Acta Cybernetica Mat. Lapok. Archived from the original (PDF) on 2015-06-10.
- On the problem of automated generation of test schemes of electronic computing machines. Kibernetika. 1976. OCLC 2001907.
- Mathematical Cybernetics, in the book "Science in Armenia in 60 years". National Armenian Academy of Sciences. 1985.
