= Solitaires of Port-Royal =

17th-century French laymen's movement

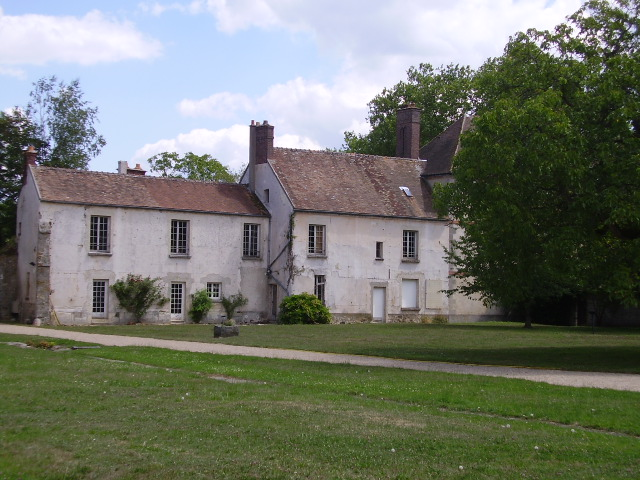
The maison des Solitaires, at Les Granges de Port-Royal-des-Champs

During the 17th century, the Solitaires were Frenchmen who chose to live a humble and ascetic life in retreat at Port-Royal-des-Champs. One of the most typical movements of 17th century France, it was closely linked to Jansenism.

Often from noble or bourgeois families, the Solitaires set up house at the monastery of Port-Royal des Champs, where nuns founded the monastery of Port-Royal de Paris then in the farm of Les Granges, on the nuns' return. The Solitaires divided their life up between manual work (agriculture, gardening, drainage, etc.) and intellectual work, producing many works on theology, patristics, paedagogy and so on. They also founded Port-Royal's Petites écoles, which proved very innovative in its teaching methods.

== Notable Solitaires ==
- Antoine Le Maistre
- Louis-Isaac Lemaistre de Sacy
- Antoine Arnauld
- Claude Lancelot
- Pierre Nicole
- Antoine Singlin
