= Desmarets =

Desmarets is a surname. Notable people with the surname include:

- Daniel Desmarets, natural history author (Insectorum et animalium Thesaurus, Leiden 1716)
- Henri Desmarets (1661–1741), French composer
- Jean Desmarets (1595–1676), French writer and dramatist
- Nicolas Desmarets, Controller-General of Finances during the reign of Louis XIV of France
- Yves Desmarets, French-born Haitian footballer
