= The Cartesian Semantics of the Port Royal Logic =

2019 book by John Newell Martin

- Cover
- Author: John N. Martin
- Language: English
- Subject: Cartesian semantics, intentional content, comprehension, signification, extension, the structure of ideas, propositions, truth, syllogistic theory, medieval supposition theory, logical methods, the tension between rationalism and empiricism, and existential import within the context of 17th and 18th-century logic.
- Genre: Non-fiction
- Publisher: Routledge
- Publication date: 2019
- Publication place: United States
- Media type: Print, eBook
- Pages: 252
- ISBN: 978-1-351-24919-5

The Cartesian Semantics of the Port-Royal Logic is a Philosophy book by John N. Martin, first published in 2019 by Routledge. This book provides an analysis of the semantics of the Port-Royal Logic (La Logique ou l’Art de penser).

== Content ==
The book provides an in-depth analysis of the semantics of the Port-Royal Logic (La Logique ou l’Art de penser), a work by Antoine Arnauld and Pierre Nicole from the 17th century. The book it presents, for the first time in English, a modern logical interpretation of this influential text, which played a crucial role in shaping logic and philosophy during the 17th and 18th centuries.

Martin's work explores how the Port-Royal Logic reinterprets pre-Cartesian logic, aligning it with René Descartes' metaphysical framework. Central to this reinterpretation is the concept of "intentional content," which is rooted in the medieval notion of objective being. This intentional content, referred to in the Logic as comprehension, consists of the defining modes of ideas and forms the foundation of the Logic's theory of reference.

Throughout the book, Martin challenges the prevailing interpretation among French scholars that the Port-Royal Logic rejects Aristotelian metaphysics entirely. Instead, he argues that while it integrates Cartesian elements, it retains significant aspects of medieval semantic theory, particularly in its adherence to a correspondence theory of truth.

Martin begins by exploring how the Port-Royal Logic navigates the challenges posed by Cartesian dualism, particularly its impact on traditional logic rooted in Aristotelian substance-mode ontology. The book demonstrates how the Logic reformulates the medieval concept of "objective being" into a new theory of intentional content to reconcile these issues.

Martin critically assesses the tendency to retrospectively interpret the Logic through the lens of Boolean algebra. He instead situates the Logic's theory of ideas within the continuity of medieval traditions, rejecting anachronistic readings and providing a more contextually accurate reconstruction.

== Critical reception ==
In his review Eyjólfur Kjalar Emilsson, from the University of Oslo, focused on the exploration of the concept of "privative negation" as discussed in the Port-Royal Logic. Emilsson noted that Martin connects this concept to Aristotle and the Neoplatonists, particularly Proclus, showing its development and application through history. The reviewer praised Martin for his originality in approaching Neoplatonic thought through the lens of logic, offering formalizations that are new to the field. Emilsson appreciated Martin's argument that the Port-Royal Logic should not be critiqued for failing to align with Boolean logic, as it operates under different philosophical influences.

Minhea Dobre stressed the book's comprehensive approach to bridging medieval and modern logic through the study of the Port-Royal Logic, which involved staying "close to the text" to avoid "ungrounded reconstruction," However, Dobre also noted that this detailed approach might be seen as tedious.

In his review, Benjamin Hill praised the book but did express some skepticism, particularly regarding Martin's assertion that intentional contents are second-order modes of the mind, describing this claim as “more dubious” compared to other aspects of Martin's analysis.

Elodie Cassan noted that Martin convincingly argued that Arnauld and Nicole's work represented “an effort to explain the semantic foundations of language and logic in a manner consistent with Descartes’ dualism”, highlighting the importance of understanding the text within its historical context rather than through the lens of modern formal logic.

Eric Stencil highlighted Martin's focus on how the Logic reconciles Cartesianism with traditional logic, noting that it "should be of interest to modern logicians."
