= Antoine Singlin =

French Jansenist priest (1607–1664)

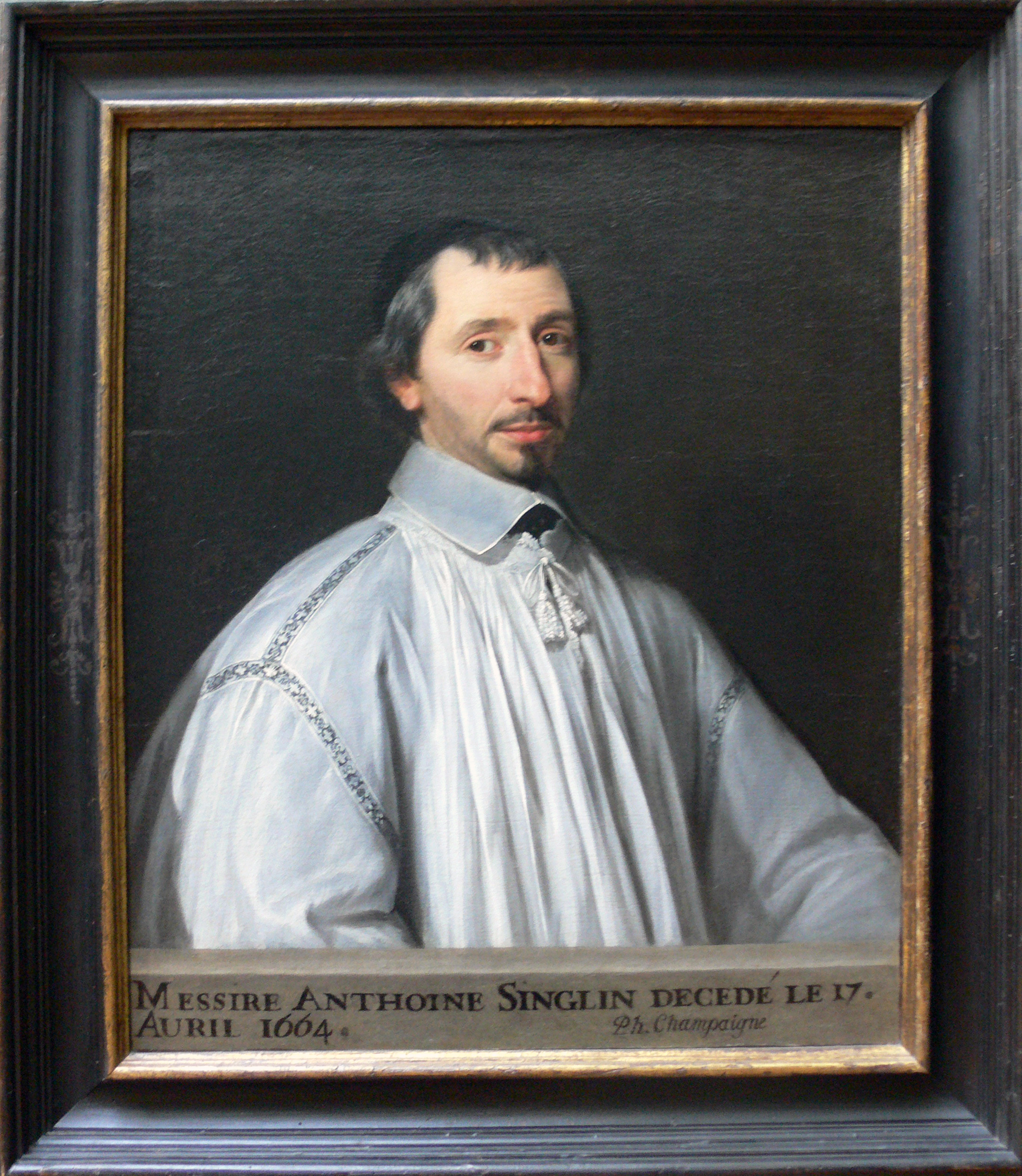
Antoine Singlin - Philippe de Champaigne - Getty Museum - with frame

Anthoine Singlin (1607–1664) was a French Jansenist Catholic priest, best known as a member of the Jansenist community at Port-Royal-des-Champs and as head of the Petites écoles de Port-Royal (set up by his friend Jean du Vergier de Hauranne).

== Biography ==
Anthoine Singlin began his priestly career beside Vincent de Paul at the hospice de la Pitié in Paris. He was then a devoted disciple of Jean du Vergier de Hauranne, abbot of Saint-Cyran and spiritual director of the monastery of Port-Royal. When he was imprisoned in the Bastille on the orders of cardinal Richelieu (from 1638 to 1643), he declared Anthoine Singlin's spiritual training complete and made him his intermediary between prison and the nuns and Solitaires at the monastery.

When Jean du Vergier de Hauranne died in 1643, some months after leaving prison, Anthoine Singlin accepted the post of almoner and spiritual director of the community, despite his own wishes to live a more retired life. Even so, in 1637 he set up Port-Royal-des-Champs's famous Petites écoles de Port-Royal, with Jean Hamon and the other Solitaires. His correspondence, recently studied and annotated, is a valuable witness to the practicalities of the monastery's life.

Anthoine Singlin continued Saint-Cyran's work spiritually, gaining a great reputation due to his words' simplicity. Uncompromising, charitable, and renouncing the world, he became the official confessor of Port-Royal in 1648. The problems caused by the signing of the formulary of Alexander VII in 1661 forced him to flee the monastery, then to try not to sign, all to cause as little scandal as he could. Taking refuge at the home of the duchesse de Longueville at Paris, where he died 3 years later in 1664.

== Bibliography ==
- Anne-Claire Josse, Lettres d'Antoine Singlin. Edited by Anne-Claire Josse, Paris, Nolin, 2003, 553 p.
