= Cartesian Linguistics =

1966 book by Noam Chomsky

- First edition
- Authors: Noam Chomsky
- Language: English
- Subject: History of linguistics
- Publisher: Harper & Row
- Publication date: 1966
- Publication place: United States
- Pages: 119
- ISBN: 1-877275-34-4
- OCLC: 711934
- Dewey Decimal: 401
- LC Class: P123

Cartesian Linguistics: A Chapter in the History of Rationalist Thought is a 1966 book by Noam Chomsky. Chomsky coined term Cartesian linguistics in the book – the adjective "Cartesian" pertains to René Descartes, a prominent 17th-century philosopher. As well as Descartes, Chomsky surveys other examples of rationalist thought in 17th-century linguistics, in particular the Port-Royal Grammar (1660), which foreshadows some of his own ideas concerning universal grammar.

Chomsky traces the development of linguistic theory from Descartes to Wilhelm von Humboldt, that is, from the period of the Enlightenment directly up to Romanticism. According to Chomsky, the central doctrine of Cartesian Linguistics is that the general features of grammatical structure are common to all languages and reflect certain fundamental properties of the mind. The book was written with the purpose of deepening "our understanding of the nature of language and the mental processes and structures that underlie its use and acquisition". Chomsky wished to shed light on these underlying structures of the human language, and subsequently whether one can infer the nature of an organism from its language.

Chomsky's book received mostly unfavorable reviews. Critics argued that "Cartesian linguistics" fails both as a methodological conception and as a historical phenomenon. These argue that Chomsky makes false interpretations of classical philosophy, and that, despite his claims, his idea does not represent the tradition of rationalist philosophy.

== Themes covered in Cartesian Linguistics ==
=== Man vs. brute ===
Certain mechanical factors of language function, such as response to stimuli, are evident in both humans and animals; however, Chomsky cites several 17th-century Cartesian experiments that show that the creative aspect of language is specific only to human beings. This is, in essence, the Cartesian theory of language production.

Chomsky writes, "one fundamental contribution of what we have been calling 'Cartesian linguistics' is the observation that human language, in its normal use, is free from the control of independently identifiable external stimuli or internal states and is not restricted to any practical communicative function, in contrast, for example, to the pseudo-language of animals". "In short, animal 'language' remains completely within the bounds of mechanical explanation as this was conceived by Descartes and Cordemoy" and the creative aspect of language is what separates humans and animals.

=== Freedom from instinct ===
Philosophical undertones permeate Cartesian theory. One example of this is the idea that freedom from instinct and from stimulus control is the basis for what we call "human reason". Weakness of instinct is man's natural advantage, that which makes him a rational being. "From this conception of language, it is only a short step to the association of the creative aspect of language use with true artistic creativity". In other words, "the 'poetical' quality of ordinary language derives from its independence of immediate stimulation and its freedom from practical ends", essentially subject matter that correlates with Cartesian philosophy.

=== Universality ===
Chomsky parallels theories of Enlightenment thinkers Humboldt, Goethe, and Herder, holding them up as researchers who were seeking a universal order and to show the tendency of Cartesian thinking to diffuse into different areas of academia. Humboldt's effort to reveal the organic form of language, like many of the cited experiments, is placed into the context of modern linguistics to show the differences between the Cartesian model of linguistics and the modern model of linguistics, and to illustrate the contributions of the former to the latter.

Another aspect of this universality is generative grammar, a Chomskyan approach, which is one finite, ubiquitous aspect of language that provides the "organic unity" of which Humboldt wrote. Also Humboldtian is the idea that the forces generating language and thought are one and the same.

=== Deep structure vs. surface structure ===
"Pursuing the fundamental distinction between body and mind, Cartesian linguistics characteristically assumes that language has two aspects", namely, the sound/character of a linguistic sign and its significance. Semantic and phonetic interpretation may not be identical in Cartesian linguistics. Deep structures are often only represented in the mind (a mirror of thought), as opposed to surface structures, which are not.

Deep structures vary less between languages than surface structures. For instance, the transformational operations yielding surface forms of Latin and French may obscure common features of their deep structures. Chomsky proposes, "In many respects, it seems to me quite accurate, then, to regard the theory of transformational generative grammar, as it is developing in current work, as essentially a modern and more explicit version of the Port-Royal theory".

=== Summary of Port Royal Grammar ===
The Port Royal Grammar is heavily cited in Cartesian Linguistics as an example of Cartesian philosophy of language. "A sentence has an inner mental aspect (a deep structure that conveys its meaning) and an outer, physical aspect as a sound sequence." Chomsky claims that Port Royal linguists developed a theory of deep and surface structures that meets the formal requirements of language theory. Chomsky describes it in modern terms as "a base system that generates deep structures and a transformational system that maps these into surface structures", essentially a form of transformational grammar akin to modern theories.

=== Past and present ===
Chomsky bridges the past with the present by stating that from the standpoint of modern linguistic theory, the characterization and discovery of deep structures is absurd, in accordance with the present study and quantification of such things as "linguistic fact" and "sound-meaning correspondences". In any case, traditional attempts to deal with deep and surface structure theory were unsuccessful.

Descartes' idea of language is that it is a form of self-expression, not merely communication…Modern linguistics hasn't dealt with, or rather hasn't fully acknowledged, problems raised by Cartesian philosophy. They have been glossed over as unnecessary problems of a generally well-accepted theory.

Another aspect of Cartesian linguistics is the "necessity for supplementing descriptive statements with a rational explanation", in order to qualify as a true science. Chomsky claims that an excessive rationality and priorism were common to the Enlightenment period and that a great, underlying hypothesis as to the general nature of language is missing in the Cartesian analysis of deep structure.

=== "Common notions" (Herbert of Cherbury's De Veritate (1624)) ===
These refer to the "inborn capacities" or a certain "natural instinct" that "instructs us in the nature, manner, and scope of what is to be heard, hoped for, or desired" (Cherbury). These latent notions are only activated through an outside stimulus. Chomsky asserts that this focus on innate and psychological doctrine as a precursor to experience and knowledge is typical of Cartesian linguistics, along with the requisite of an external stimulus for activation of the doctrine's latent function.

=== Approach to language learning ===
With this said, "language acquisition is a matter of growth and maturation of relatively fixed capacities, under appropriate external conditions". The 17th century's amenable approach to language learning was very non-conforming, as the overall perception was that knowledge arose on the basis of scattered, inadequate data. Properties conducive to what is learned were attributed to the mind. Theories of perception and learning were essentially the same, though it was an acknowledged difference that would consequently become indistinct during acquisition.

"Thus prior knowledge and set play a large role in determining what we see" (Cudworth [Treatise on Morality] 423-424) A common idea/perception was that an object/idea could be stamped upon the soul upon the occasion of an idea excited from the comprehensive power of the intellect itself. Only Humboldt, who was a living connection between the rationalist Enlightenment and the Romantic period, devised the underlying generative system of language perception. Again, Chomsky asserts that "contemporary research in perception has returned to the investigation of internally represented schemata...". The current work of modern linguistics continues the tradition of Cartesian linguistics in transformational grammar.

Chomsky formulates fundamental conclusions of Cartesian linguistics in his studies.

== Reception and developments ==
Chomsky accomplished his research for Cartesian Linguistics while he was a fellow of the American Council of Learned Societies; thereafter a great deal of subject matter was presented at the Christian Gauss seminars at Princeton University in 1965. Since the publication of Cartesian Linguistics, Chomsky's history has been criticized as an artificial predecessor to his own ideas, mainly formulated in the context of 1950s psychological behaviorism.

The book was "widely and rightly judged to be a radical failure" which failed to claim a place for Chomsky among the classics of philosophy. Chomsky was accused of interpreting philosophical sources and using their terminology in a misleading way. Historians and philosophers argued that Chomsky's nativist theory of language does not represent rationalism because he is merely referring to its concept of innate ideas. Since Chomsky's version of Universal grammar lacks a concept of innate ideas, it does not have a place in rationalism.

One of the main objections to the book's argument bears on the point that, for his "Cartesian linguistics", Chomsky relies mostly on the Port-Royal grammar and not on Descartes' writings. In fact, the grammar is not Cartesian in any interesting sense. The whole discussion was succinctly summarized in 1969: "Professor Chomsky may wish to cling to the term "Cartesian linguistics" for reasons not fully explicit in his book, although his remarks on the use of such a label suggest that he means simply 'rationalist linguistics.' But if he wishes to include under his label the Cartesian notion of language as species-specific to man, and the notion of underlying structures (which I argue is not Cartesian in origin), as well as the general rational approach, he can do no better than to use the term 'Port-Royal linguistics'."

Chomsky replied to his critics and defended the validity of his conception by further elaborating his historical perspective. The book was re-edited by James McGilvray in 2002 and 2009 with only minor changes and lengthy introductions. New reviews invariably point to previous criticism which had been left unanswered, suggesting that the introductory essays also failed to convince.
