= Pierre Le Pesant, sieur de Boisguilbert =

French law-maker and Jansenist

Boisguilbert
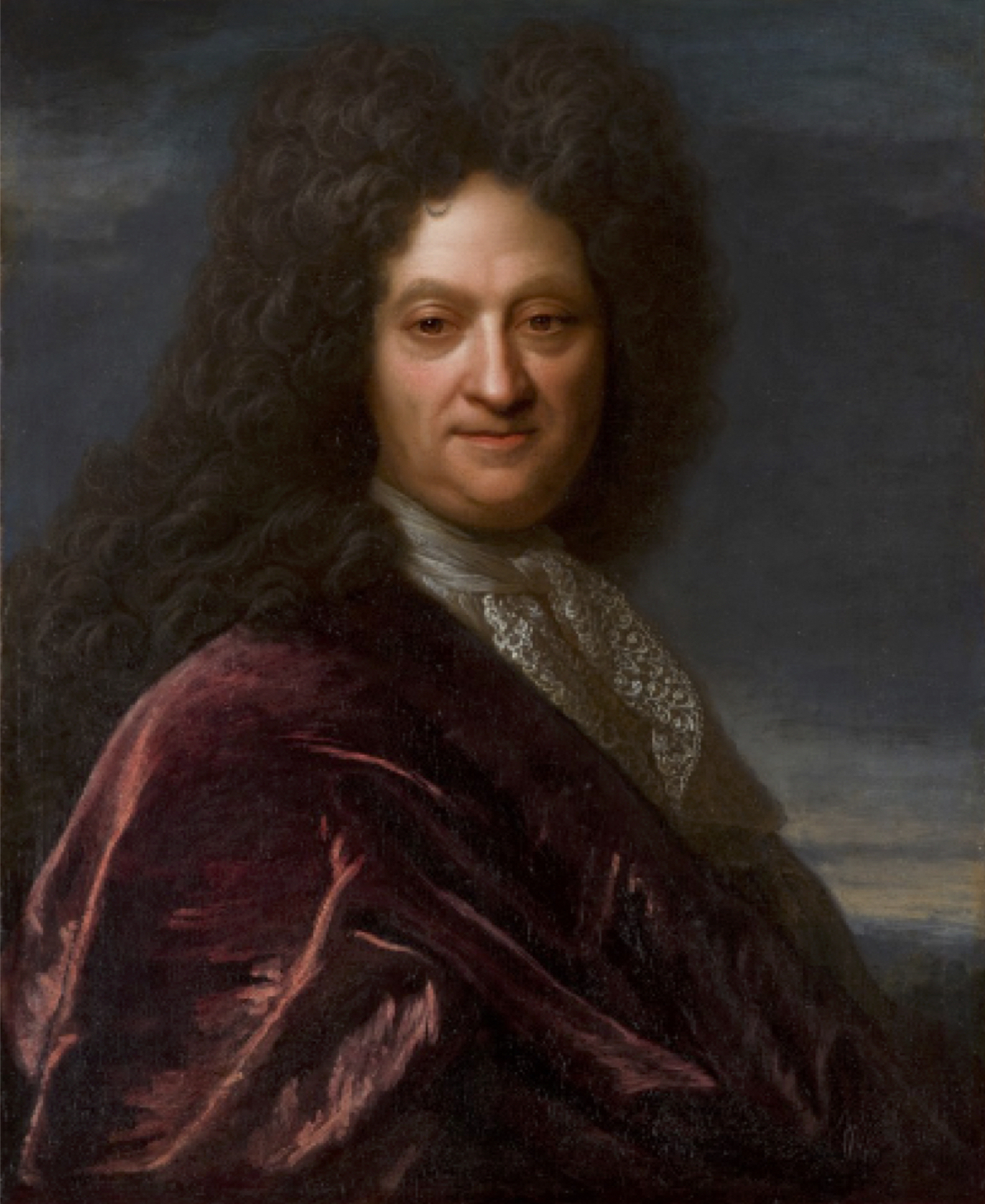
- Pierre le Pesant, sieur de Boisguilbert
- Born: 17 February 1646; Rouen
- Died: 10 October 1714 (aged 68); Rouen

Academic work
- Discipline: Political economics
- School or tradition: Physiocrats

Pierre le Pesant, sieur de Boisguilbert or Boisguillebert (French: [bwaɡilbɛʁ]; 17 February 1646 – 10 October 1714) was a French lawmaker and a Jansenist under the rule of Louis XIV. Today he is remembered as one of the early inventors of the notion of an economic market and for his writings on the benefit of paper money over traditional commodity coins.

== Early life ==
He was born at Rouen of an ancient noble family of Normandy, allied to that of Corneille. He received his classical education in Rouen, and was also taught at the Petites écoles de Port-Royal, entered the magistracy and became judge at Montivilliers, near Le Havre. In 1690 he became president of the bailliage of Rouen, a post which he retained almost until his death, leaving it to his son.

== Taxation proposals ==
In his two leadership positions he made a close study of local economic conditions, personally, supervising the cultivation of his lands, and entering into relations with the principal merchants of Rouen. He was thus led to consider the misery of the people under the burden of taxation. In 1695 he published his principal work, Le détail de la France; la cause de la diminution de ses biens et la facilité du remède. In it he drew a picture of the general ruin of all classes of Frenchmen, caused by the bad economic regime. In opposition to Jean-Baptiste Colbert's mercantilist views he held that the wealth of a country consists, not in the abundance of money which it possesses but in what it produces and exchanges. The remedy for the evils of the time was not so much the reduction as the equalization of the imposts, which would allow the poor to consume more, raise the production and add to the general wealth. He demanded the reform of the taille, the suppression of internal customs duties and greater freedom of trade. In his Factum de la France, published in 1705 or 1706, he gave a more concise résumé of his ideas. But his proposal to substitute for all aides and customs duties a single capitation tax of a tenth of the revenue of all property was naturally opposed by the tax farmers and found little support.

Indeed, his work, written in a diffuse and inelegant style, passed almost unnoticed. Saint-Simon relates that he once asked a hearing of the comte de Pontchartrain, saying that he would at first take him for a fool, then he would see that he deserved attention, and that eventually, he would be satisfied with his system. Pontchartrain, who was besieged with innumerable advice givers, began to laugh replying that he would go no further than the first, and turned his back on him. With Michel de Chamillart, whom he had known as intendant of Rouen (1689–1690), there was a plan to experiment with Boisguilbert's ideas in one province but the plan was abandoned when it was realized that the effort would provoke the collapse of the existing tax system before the experiment began. Upon the publication of Vauban's, La Dîme royale in 1707 which had much in common with Boisguilbert's plan, Boisguilbert published Supplément au détail de la France. Both Vauban's and Boisguilbert's books were condemned. In addition, Boisguilbert was exiled to Auvergne for six months. At last in 1710 the controller-general, Nicolas Desmarets, established a new tax, the tenth (dixième), which had some analogy with the project of Boisguilbert. Instead of replacing the former taxes, however, Desmarets simply added his dixième to them.

== Paper Money ==
Boisguilbert was one of the first advocates of paper money in France. He argued that the foundation of money was credit, not the commodity nature of the material from which it was made. He famously wrote that if gold and silver functioned as money it was not because they had "any wealth in themselves," but because they were "valuable only relatively, and only insofar as they can procure the things necessary for life, for which they serve solely as a pledge and a means of evaluation." Money, said Boisguilbert, was "only a guarantee of a future delivery of a good that one does not receive immediately." As a result, Boisguilbert realized that money could be made of paper instead of precious metals. There were “much easier and far less costly means” of conducting commerce, Boisguilbert argued. This could be achieved

by introducing a competitor: not copper, seashells, or tobacco (as in the places previously mentioned, which each require effort and labor to acquire), but a simple piece of paper. This paper costs nothing, yet it could replace all the uses of money for sums reaching into the millions an infinity of times over.

== Publications ==
In 1712 appeared a Testament politique de M. de Vauban, which is simply Boisguilberts Détail de la France. Vauban's Dîme royale was formerly wrongly attributed to him. Boisguilberts works were collected by Daire in the first volume of the Collection des grands économistes. His letters are in the Correspondance des contrôleurs géneraux, vol. i., published by A. M. de Boislisle. A complete study of Boisguilbert, his ideas and his writings was published by the Institut National d'Études Démographiques in 1966.
