= Port-Royal Grammar =

1660 textbook

The Port-Royal Grammar (originally Grammaire générale et raisonnée contenant les fondemens de l'art de parler, expliqués d'une manière claire et naturelle, "General and Rational Grammar, containing the fundamentals of the art of speaking, explained in a clear and natural manner") was a milestone in the analysis and philosophy of language. Published in 1660 by Antoine Arnauld and Claude Lancelot, it was the linguistic counterpart to the Port-Royal Logic (1662), both named after the Jansenist monastery of Port-Royal-des-Champs where their authors worked. The Port-Royal Grammar became used as a standard textbook in the study of language until the early nineteenth century, and it has been reproduced in several editions and translations. In the twentieth century, scholars including Edmund Husserl and Noam Chomsky maintained academic interest in the book.

Arnauld and Lancelot's approach to language is historical, comparative, and philosophical. Discussing the essence of French, they give examples from Latin, Greek, Arabic, Hebrew, Spanish, Italian, and German. Their work is influenced by the Modistae Grammar of Thomas of Erfurt, and later grammars and textbooks authored by scholars including Julius Caesar Scaliger, Sanctius, Petrus Ramus and Claude Favre de Vaugelas, Other influences include Andreas Helwig's etymology, Francis Bacon's universal language project, and works by philosophers including René Descartes, and Blaise Pascal.

A core argument of Arnauld and Lancelot's general and rational grammar is that language reveals human thought structures which are based on the logic of predication. The notion is that all thought structures are based on logic and refrain from outside judgment. All languages are similar because there is only one logic. Their connection between logic and grammar has much to do with the idea of the vocabulary concluding the logic of a statement, that arguments within arguments lead to an unsaid logical deduction.

This idea was elaborated by Edmund Husserl in his treatise of universal grammar in 1920. He published the first formulation of generative grammar, which he based on "pure logic". Husserl's aim was to provide a counter-argument to a psychologistic view of language and logic. David Hilbert and Rudolph Carnap further developed Husserl's model, leading to the creation of Categorial Grammar in the 1930s through 1950s. More lately, phenomenologists criticized it for using simple predicates instead of modern complex ones.

== Rational grammar and biology ==
The Port-Royal Grammar has been the subject of debates relating to the demarcation problem between humanities and natural sciences for centuries. In the tradition of rational grammar, language is seen as a man-made invention. Age of Reason philosophers thought that God created Man social and rational, and these two natural characteristics gave rise to his need to construct a language to communicate his thoughts to others. Thus, the arising view was based on the stipulation that speculations referring to the Creation could be left out of social and cultural analysis.

== Chomsky's interpretation ==
Noam Chomsky considers The Port-Royal Grammar as evidence for his innate concept of language in his 1966 book Cartesian Linguistics, associating the idea to Descartes. Chomsky's claim became soon disputed by historians of linguistics including Hans Aarsleff, Robin Lakoff, E. F. K. Koerner, and Vivian Salmon. While Descartes is more famous than Arnauld and Lancelot, he wrote little about language and was not involved in the making of Port-Royal Grammar. The dispute also concerns Arnauld and Lancelot's analysis of their example sentence Invisible God created the visible world. In a classical view, the sentence is composed of the three unary predicates 'God is invisible', 'he created the world', and 'the world is visible'. In other words, Arnauld and Lancelot, and their later interpreters including Husserl, considered semantics and thought as compositional and being built up of logical propositions.

Chomsky, in contrast, was looking for a historical precursor of his concept of deep structure versus surface structure. For example, the surface structure John and Mary are fishing is derived via a transformation from the purportedly not semantic but biological deep grammar structure John is fishing and Mary is fishing. However, historians have argued that it is not what Arnauld and Lancelot meant. Nonetheless, based on his observations and Descartes's concept of innate ideas, Chomsky eventually explained that universal grammar is an innate brain structure which stems from a genetic mutation in humans, thus reinterpreting linguistics as a biological enterprise. In his conception, dependency structures cannot be learned using reasoning, but are acquired by the child from a hypothesized language organ. The Port-Royal Grammar does not argue that people are born rational in the sense that they possess an innate rational grammar. Rather, it contends that grammatical phenomena were "invented" so that people could express their mental experiences.

== Editions and translations ==
- Antoine Arnauld & Claude Lancelot, Grammaire générale et raisonnée, ou La Grammaire de Port-Royal, présentée par Herbert E. Brekle, Stuttgart-Bad Cannstatt: Frommann, 1966.
- Antoine Arnauld & Claude Lancelot, General and Rational Grammar: The Port-Royal Grammar, translated by Jacques Rieux and Bernard E. Rollin, The Hague: Mouton, 1975.

== Bibliography ==
- Maria Tsiapera & Garon Wheeler, The Port-Royal Grammar: Sources and Influences, Münster: Nodus, 1993.
- Vivian Salmon, Cartesian Linguistics in The Study of Language in 17th Century England, Benjamins, 1988.
- Camiel Hamans & Pieter A.M. Seuren, Chomsky in search of a pedigree in Chomskyan (R)evolutions. Edited by Douglas A. Kibbee. Benjamins, 2010.
