= Jean Hamon (doctor) =

French doctor and writer

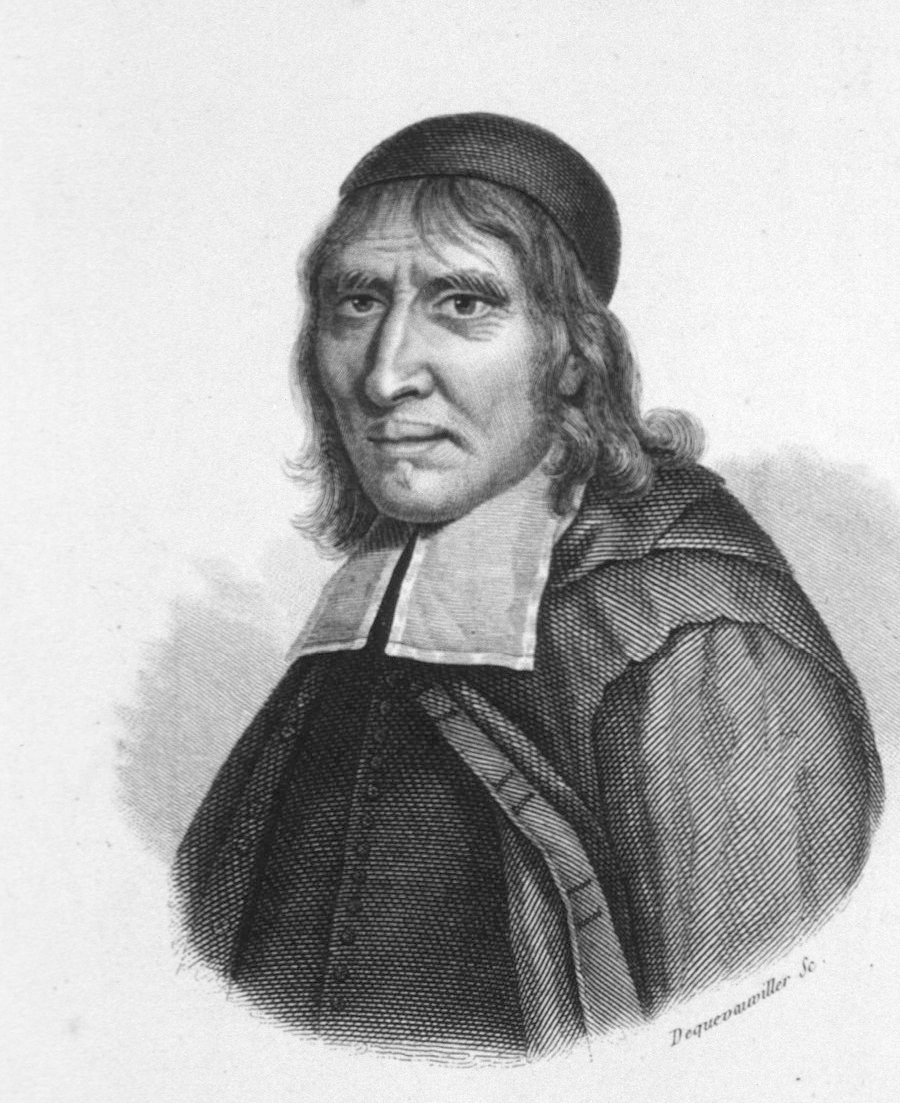
Jean Hamon

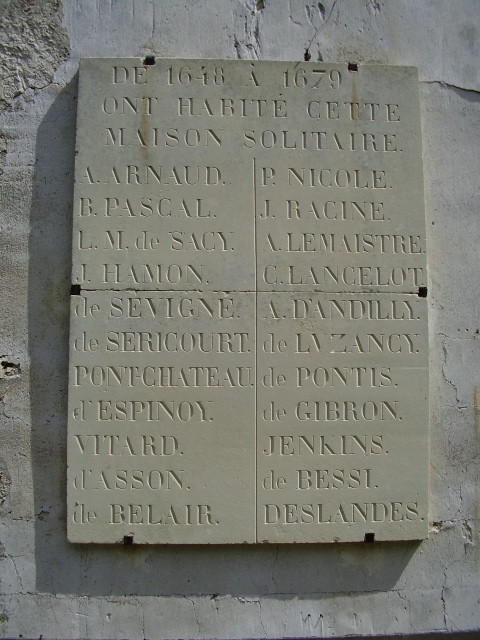
Plaque on the house of the Solitaires de Port-Royal, "From 1648 to 1679, these people lived in this house", Hamon's name is fourth on the left

Jean Hamon (2 January 1618 – 22 February 1687) was a French doctor and writer of many works on medical and religious subjects. He was born in Cherbourg. A Jansenist, he taught at the Petites écoles de Port-Royal. He died in Paris.

== Published works ==
- Apologia Patris Cellotii (1648)
- Écrit touchant l’excommunication, composé par M. Hamon, vers l’année 1665, à l’occasion des troubles excités dans l’Église, par rapport au Formulaire, 1665
- Traités de piété, (2 vol, 1675)
- Traitez de morale de S. Augustin pour tous les états qui composent le corps de l’Église, (traduits du Latin, 1680)
- Aegrae animae et dolorem suum lenire conantis pia in psalmum centesimum decimum octavum soliloquia (Amsterdam, 1684; traduit en français par Fontaine en 1685 et Goujet en 1732)
- Sur la morale et les devoirs des pasteurs (2 vol, 1689)
- Pratique de la prière continuelle ou Sentiments d’une âme vivement touchée de Dieu (1702)
- Explication du Cantique de Cantiques (4 vol, 1708)
- Instruction pour les religieuses de Port-Royal (2 vol, 1727–30)
- Les Gémissements d’un cœur chrétien, exprimés dans les paroles du psaume CXVIII (1731)
- Recueil de lettres (2 volumes, 1734)
- De la solitude (1734)
- Explication de l’oraison dominicale (1738)
- L’Horloge de la passion, qui servoit de sujet de méditation aux Religieuses de Port-Royal pendant l’adoration du très-saint-Sacrement avec des oraisons tirées de M. Hamon, 1739
- Entretiens d’une âme avec Dieu... Avignon : aux dépens de la Société, 1740
- Abrégé de la vie de la révérende mère Marie-Angelique Arnauld, abbesse & réformatrice de Port-Royal, dans Entretiens ou conferences de la révérende mère Marie-Angélique Arnauld, abbesse & réformatrice de Port-Royal, 1757
