= Vardenis =

City in Gegharkunik, Armenia

Vardenis Վարդենիս
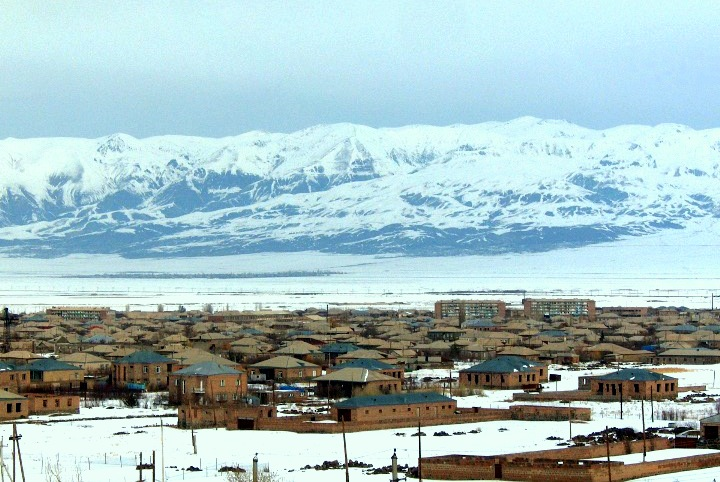
- Vardenis in February 2009

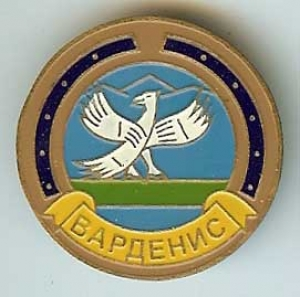
- Coat of arms

- Location within Armenia Location within Gegharkunik
- Coordinates: 40°10′50″N 45°43′12″E
- Country: Armenia
- Province: Gegharkunik
- Municipality: Vardenis
- Founded: 1830

Government
  - Mayor: Aram Melkonyan

Area
  - Total: 10 km^{2} (3.9 sq mi)
- Elevation: 2,006 m (6,581 ft)

Population (2022)
  - Total: 12,466
  - Density: 1,200/km^{2} (3,200/sq mi)
- Time zone: UTC+4 (AMT)
- Area code: +374 (269)

Vardenis (Armenian: Վարդենիս [vɑɾtʰɛˈnis]) is a town in the Vardenis Municipality of Gegharkunik Province, Armenia. It is in the Masrik River valley, on the territory of the Masrik artesian basin at 2,006 metres (6,581 feet) above sea level, near the southeastern shores of Lake Sevan. It is 170 kilometres (110 miles) by road east of the capital Yerevan, and 75 kilometres (47 miles) southeast of the provincial centre Gavar. The administrative territory of Vardenis comprises 3,006 hectares (7,430 acres), of which 736 hectares (1,820 acres) is occupied by the town itself. Vardenis obtained its status as an urban settlement in 1995. In the 2011 census the population was 12,685, and in the 2022 census it was 12,466.

== Etymology ==
The town was originally known as Vasakashen (Վասակաշեն) after Prince Vasak, who built his palace there in the Middle Ages. Vardenis was later known as Basarkechar until 1969 (Բասարգեչար, Basargechar; Azerbaijani: Basargeçer; Russian: Басаргечар)

== History ==
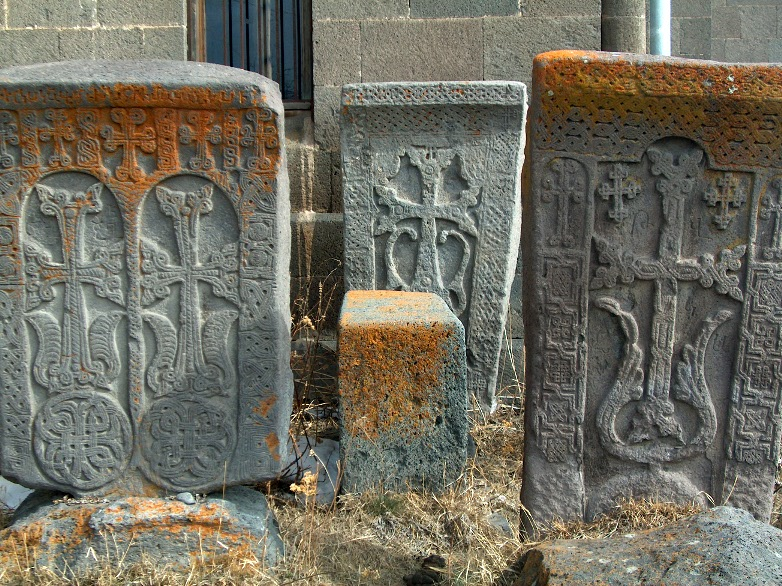
Medieval khachkars near the town's church

According to historian Ghevond Alishan, prince Gaburn Vasak of the Siunia dynasty founded Vasakashen by establishing a palace on the territory of modern-day Vardenis in the 9th century, which survived until the 17th century.

Vardenis is one of the oldest settlements in Armenia. Local monuments include the Makenats monastery, the basilica in Sotk, the chapels of Ayrk and Karchaghbyur, tombs of the 3rd-1st millennia BC, the Cyclopean masonry, and the medieval khachkars (intricately carved stone crosses). In the centre of Vardenis is the Church of Surp Astvatsatsin (Holy Mother of God), built in 1905, where the Armenian historian Hovhannes Tsaretsi worked. The church is surrounded with numerous khachkars from the 14th to 17th centuries.

Under the Armenian Soviet Socialist Republic the town of Vardenis was the administrative capital of the Vardenis District.

In 2020, during the 2020 Nagorno-Karabakh war, Vardenis was struck by a rocket launched from an Azerbaijani drone.

In September 2022, Vardenis as well as several other Armenian towns, including Jermuk (Vayots Dzor Province), Goris (Syunik Province) and Sotk (Gegharkunik Province), came under attack by Azerbaijani Armed Forces. Many residential houses were damaged as a result of the shelling; people were displaced from their homes.

== Geography ==
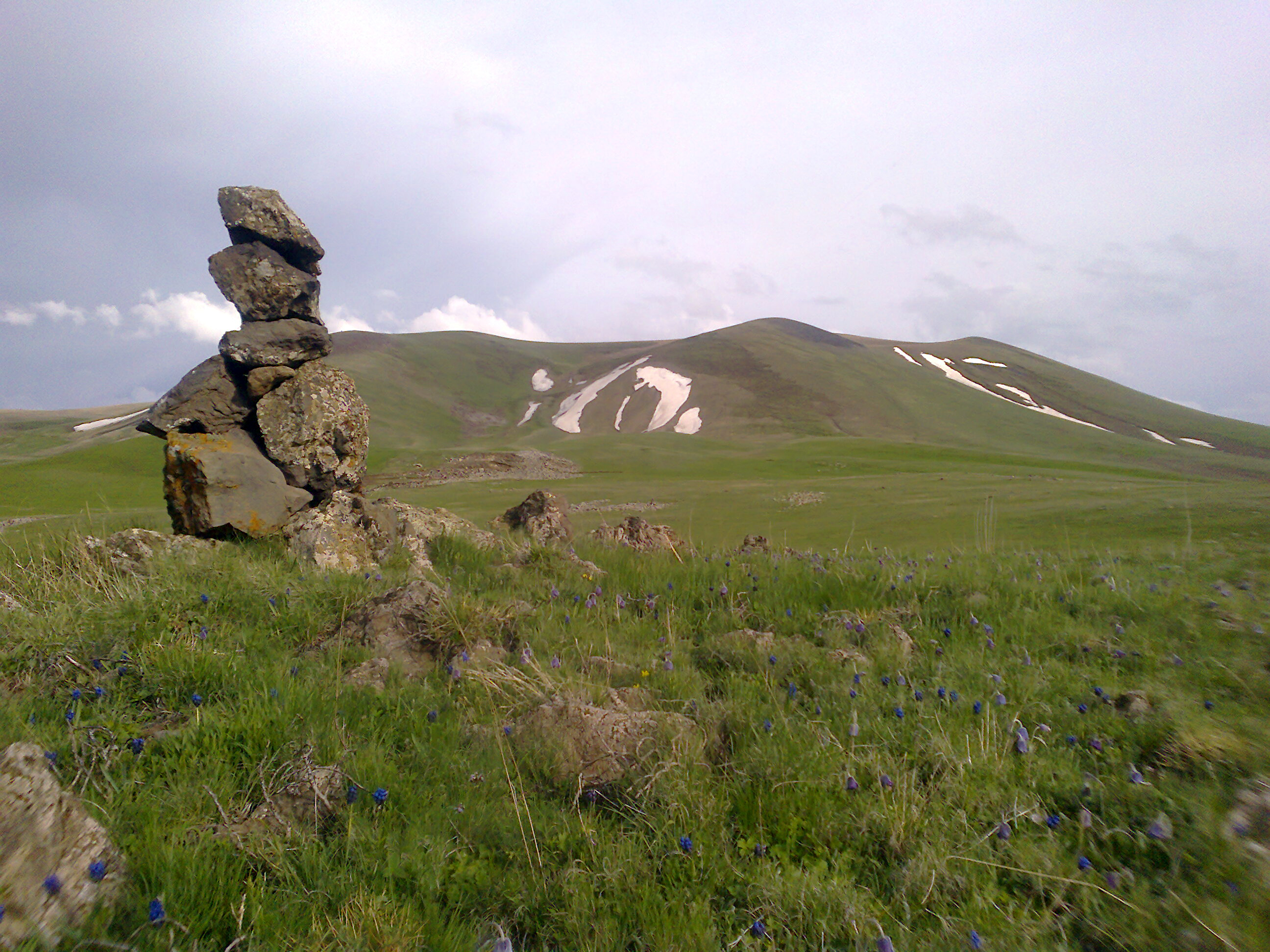
Sevkar (Sevsar) volcano of the Vardenis Mountains (3,063 metres (10,049 ft)), around 40 km southwest of Vardenis town

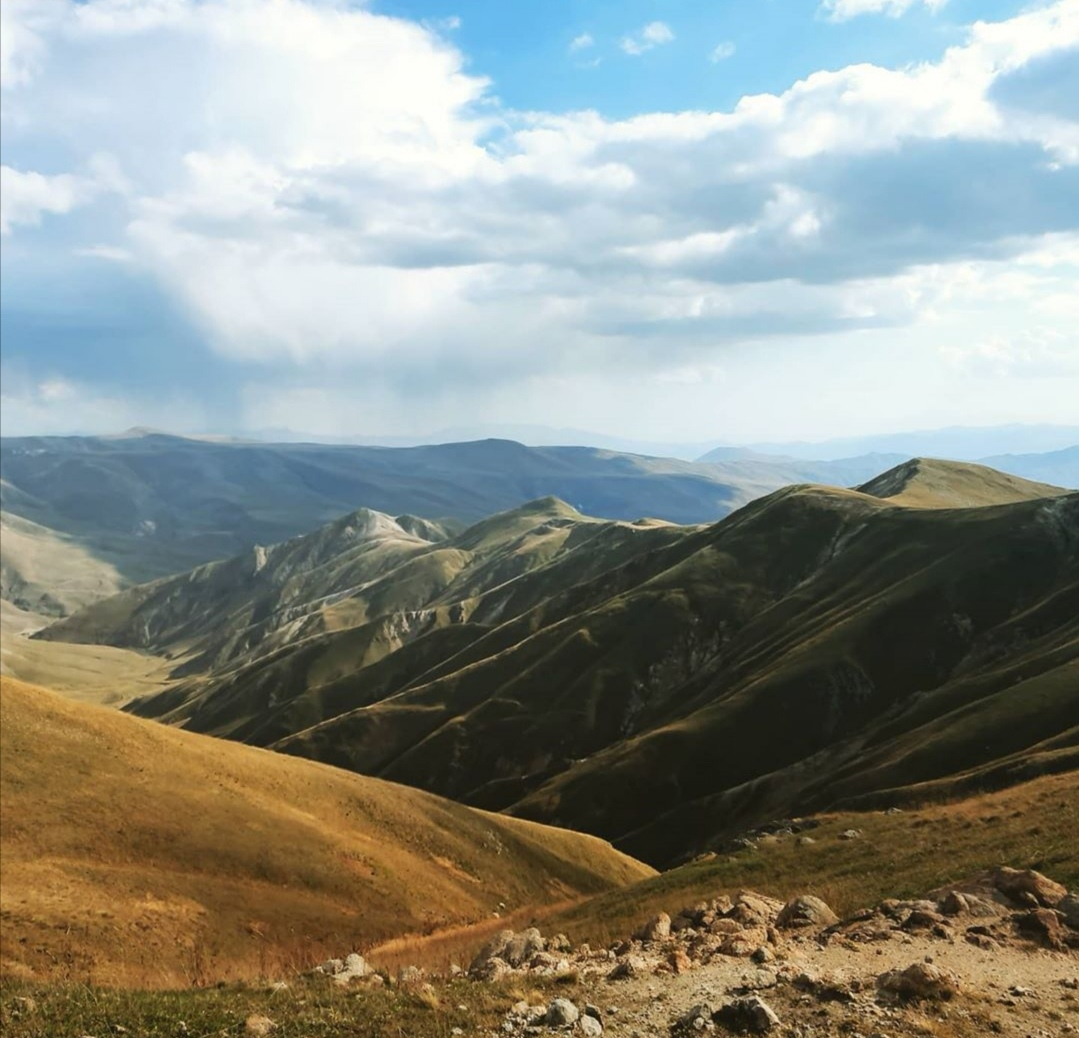
Vardenis mountain landscape

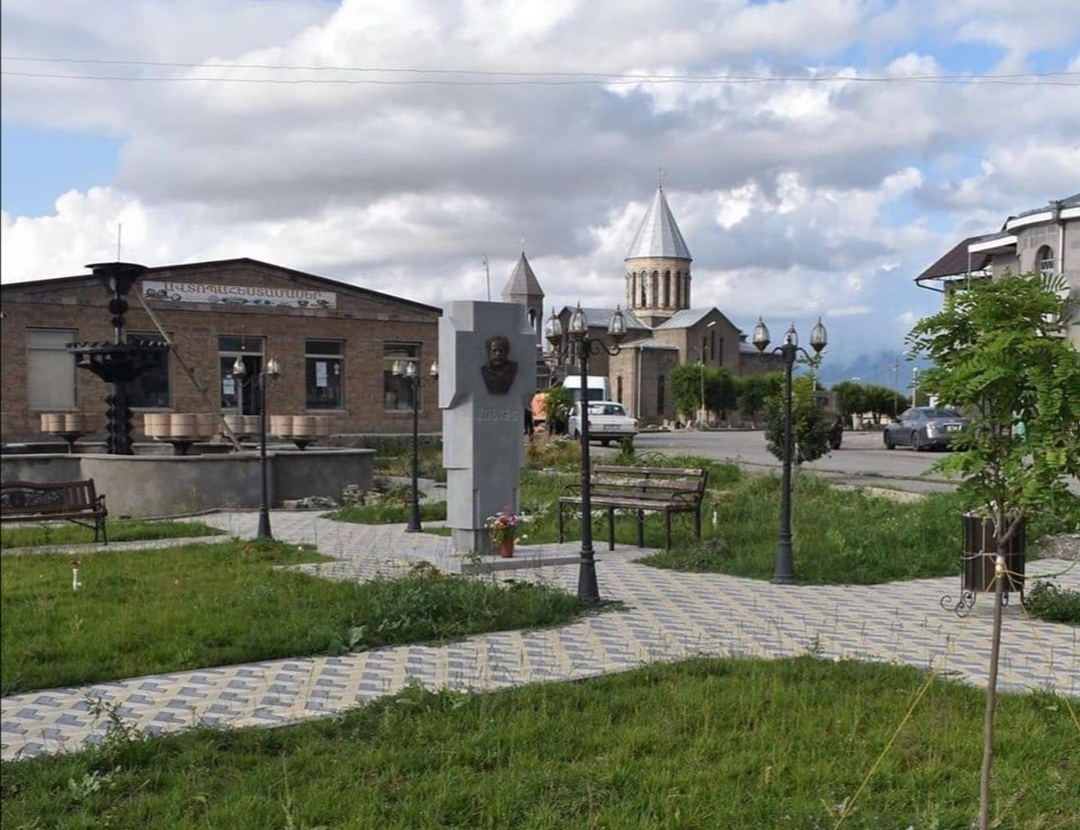
The central square and St. Astvatsatsin Church in Vardenis

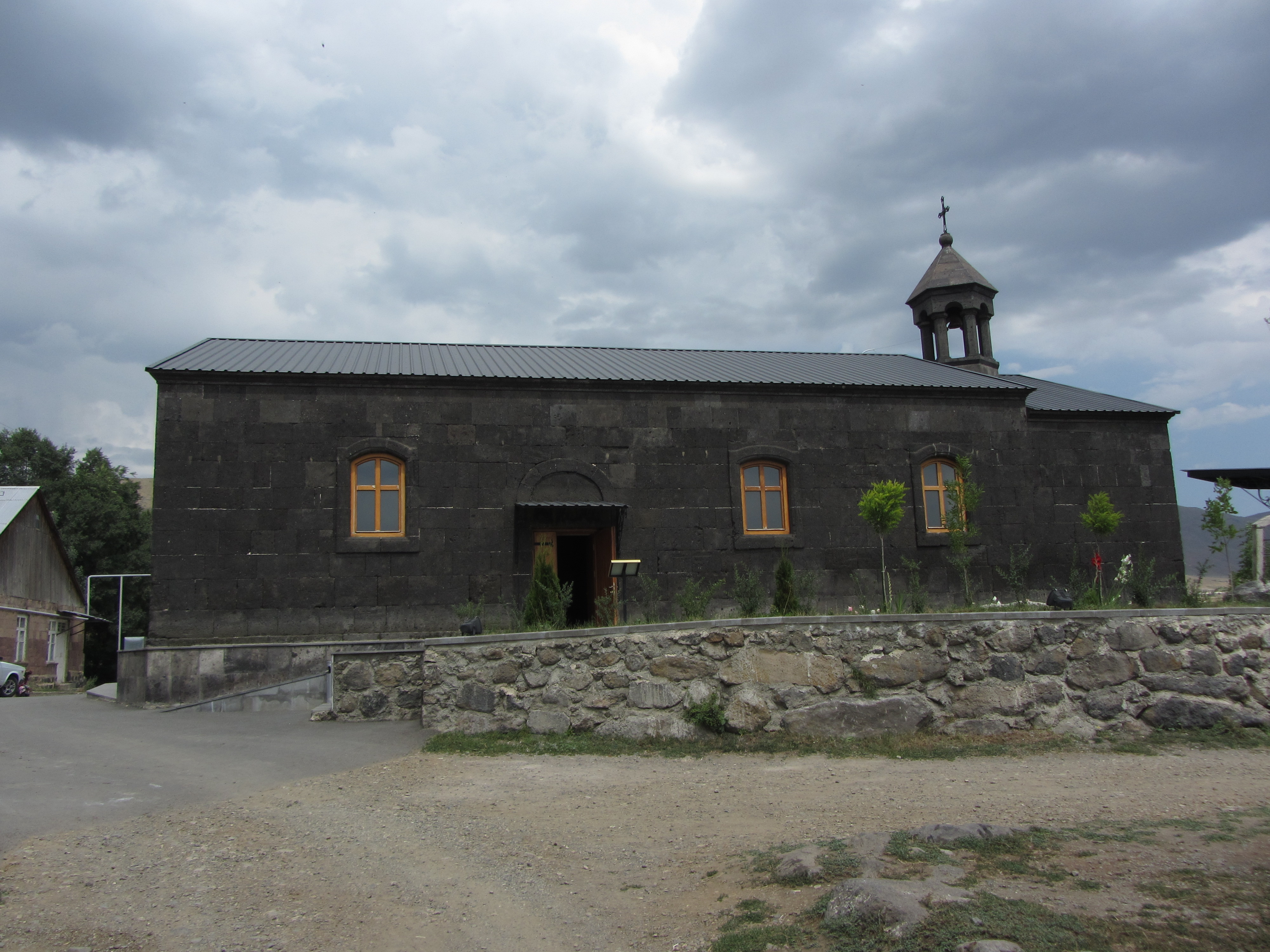
St. Hakob Church in Vardenis

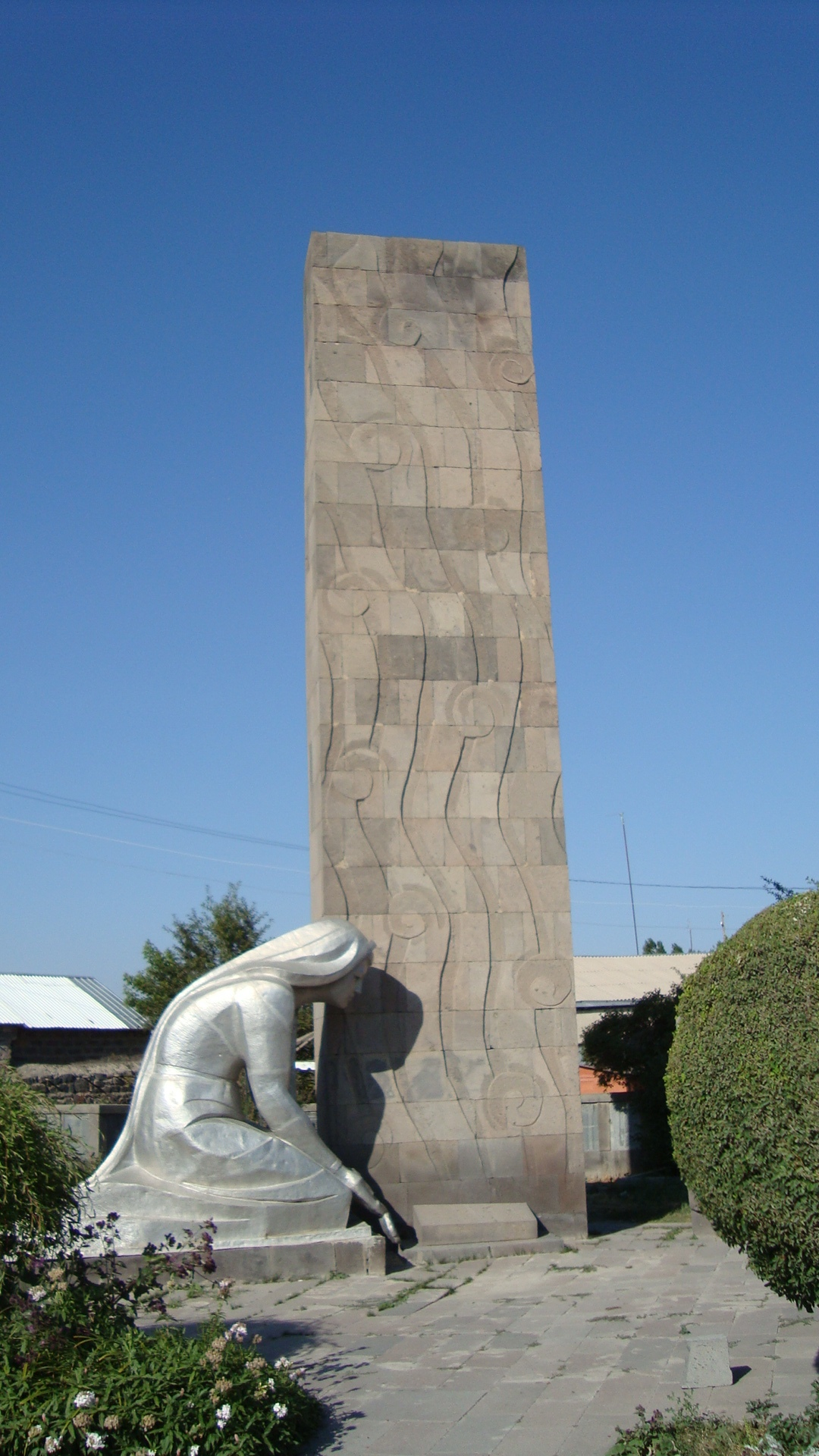
WWII monument to perished soldiers in the centre of Vardenis

Located in the valley of the Masrik River at an elevation of 2006 meters above sea level, Vardenis is dominated by the 82-kilometre (51 mi) range of Vardenis Mountains. The highest peak of the range is Mount Vardenis at 3,522 metres (11,555 ft) above sea level, located around 23 km southwest of Vardenis town. The town is also bordered by the Sevan mountain range to the north. Vardenis is approximately 6 kilometres (4 mi) away from the southeastern shores of Lake Sevan.

=== Climate ===
Vardenis is 1,943 metres (6,375 feet) above sea level, with mild summers and cold winters. The average winter temperature is −6 °C (21 °F). The winter lasts for six months, with sub-zero temperatures prevailing. The snow falls in November and melts in mid-April. Vardenis is known for high insolation with 2,500 to 2,700 hours annually. Precipitation comprises 400 to 500 millimetres (16 to 20 in). The number of blizzard days is 30, of which 13 are in January.

The summer is short, mild, sunny and humid, with minimal precipitation. The average minimum temperature of July–August is 16 °C (61 °F). while the maximum makes up to 35 °C (95 °F). Eastern winds prevail during the whole year. The autumn is mild, with the first half being moderately cloudy. The second half is unstable.

Meteorological observations of the town (air temperature, precipitation, atmospheric pressure, relative humidity, absolute humidity, wind direction and speed etc.) are implemented by Vardenis-Masrik meteorological stations, established in the 1940s at 1,842.7 metres (6,045.6 feet) above sea level.

=== Geology ===
The town of Vardenis is situated on the Masrik plain, in the valley of Masrik river. From the north it is bordered by Lake Sevan, from the east by Zangezur mountains and from the southeast by Vardenis mountains. From a morphological point of view, Masrik represents an intermountain area filled with fluvial-lacustrian deposits. The major part of the town, i.e. alluvial-proluvial-accumulative plain, is presented by claysands, clays, sands, several subsoils. The south-eastern part of the town sits on erosion-denudational slopes, presented by slightly eroded, poriferous basalt. On the whole territory of Vardenis there are no active tectonic rifts. The projected earthquake acceleration varies between 0.28 and 0.32g. In the town centre, the acceleration is 0.32g (8.5 magnitude), in the southern and eastern parts the magnitude reaches up to 8.25-8.5.

The town is near Sevan National Park.

=== Water resources ===
Gegharkunik province is rich in water resources (surface, ground fresh and mineral waters). Water resources of the whole province comprise about 692,000 cubic metres (24,437,749 cubic feet) per day. Water resources of the Vardenis area amount to about 248 cubic metres (8,800 cubic feet) a day, of which about 115 cubic metres (4,100 ft^{3}) a day are subject to use.

Masrik river runs through the northern part of the town. The horizon of the ground waters of this artesian basin lies 1.5 and 5 metres (4.9 and 16.4 feet) deep, which together with the horizon of weak pressured waters creates a joint water-bearing horizon. The fluctuations in the water level are between 0.24 and 0.57 metres (9.4 and 22.4 inches).

Water in Vardenis is supplied by "Akunk", "Shat Jrer" and "Akner" water-pipe systems. The pipes of inner system and captation are currently in quite poor technical and sanitation condition.

== Demographics ==
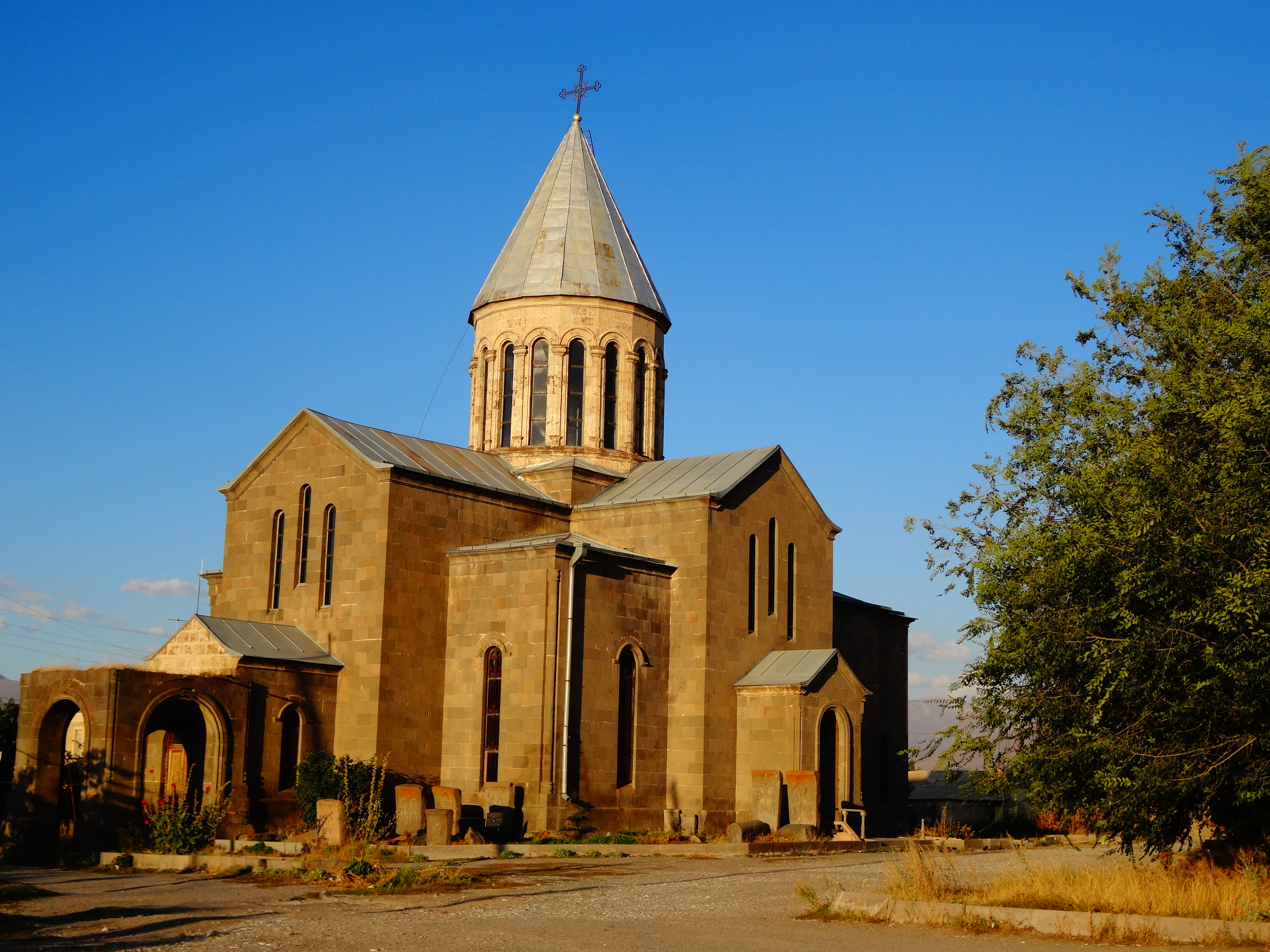
Holy Mother of God Church

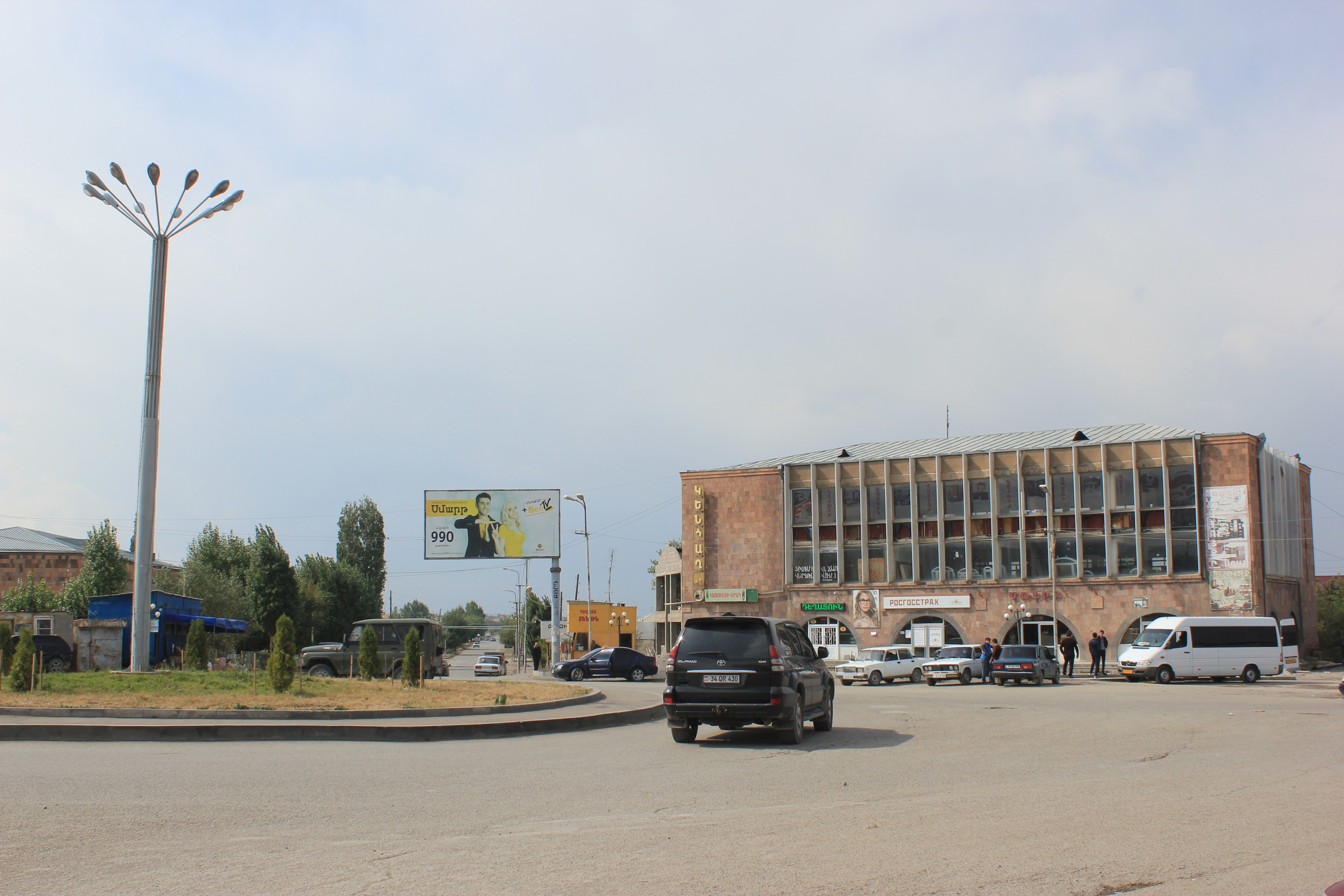
A view of Vardenis

In the 2001 census, the town of Vardenis had a population of 12,753. Deterioration of economic potential, difficult financial situation, high unemployment rates and other problems resulted in decrease of the population. In comparison with 1996, the population decreased by 14%, mainly due to youth migration, and consequently low birth rates.

Currently, the town is mainly populated by ethnic Armenians who belong to the Armenian Apostolic Church. The Holy Mother of God church, built between 1903 and 1912, is the town's main church regulated by the Diocese of Gegharkounik based in Gavar.

The population of Vardenis since 1831 is as follows:

Year	Population	Note
1831	178	100% Muslim
1873	1,296	100% Armenian
1886	1,691	100% Armenian
1897	2,193	2,108 Armenian Apostolics, 85 Muslims
1908	2,472	
1914	2,883	Mainly Armenian. Also recorded as 2,582
1916	2,196	
1919	2,751	Mainly Armenian
1922	2,512	2,511 Armenians, 1 Turkish-Tatar
1926	3,468	3,456 Armenians, 7 Turks, 5 Russians
1931	3,943	3,914 Armenians, 19 Turks, 10 Russians
1939	5,064	4,870 Armenians, 135 Azerbaijanis, 53 Russians, 6 others
1959	6,322	
1979	11,549	
1989	13,905	
2001	12,753	
2004	12,700	
2011	12,685	
2016	12,600	

== Sport ==
Lernagorts Vardenis FC was dissolved in 1995.

== International relations ==
=== Twin towns – Sister cities ===
Vardenis is twinned with:

- Romans-sur-Isère, France

== Notable people ==
- Ashot Petrosian (1930–1998), Soviet-Armenian mathematician
- Taguhi Tovmasyan (born 1982), politician
- Ferdinand Karapetian (born 1992), European champion in judo
