= Aragats (computer) =

Soviet system developed from 1958 to 1960

Aragats is a first-generation electronic computer developed at the Yerevan Computer Research and Development Institute (YerNIIMM). The elemental base is vacuum tubes. The work supervisor is B.E.Khaikin.

Development continued from 1958 to 1960. In total, 4 copies of the machine were produced.

The basis for the development was the M-3 computer, developed by the team of I. S. Bruk. Simultaneously with the work on "Aragats", and also on the basis of the M-3 scheme, the YerNIIMM developed the Razdan computer, based on a semiconductor element base. To assist in the creation of Razdan and Aragats, several employees of the Computing Center of the Academy of Sciences were seconded to Yerevan, the head of the group was A.P. Merenkov.

The head copy was acquired by Perm State University in 1961, although it was originally created for Leningrad State University. It was located on the basement floor of the educational building No. 2, and worked until 1973, until it was decommissioned. At the moment, the brass emblem from the computer is stored in the university museum.

== Specifications ==
RAM – on ferrite cores

Information storage devices:

- Magnetic drum
- Magnetic tape
- Punched tape
