= Nairi (computer) =

Nairi-3
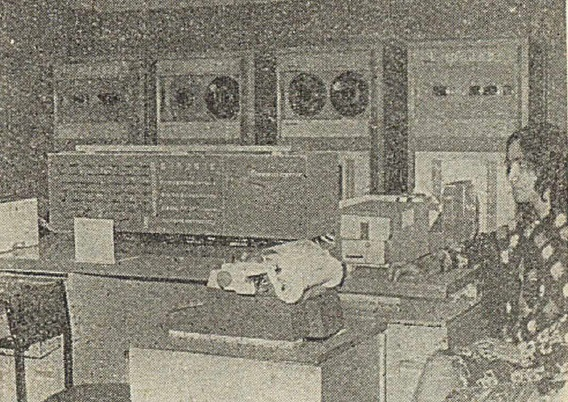
- Nairi-3 computer in Polish magazine Informatyka, 1977
- Developer: Yerevan Research Institute of Mathematical Machines
- Released: 1970; 56 years ago
- Predecessor: Nairi-2

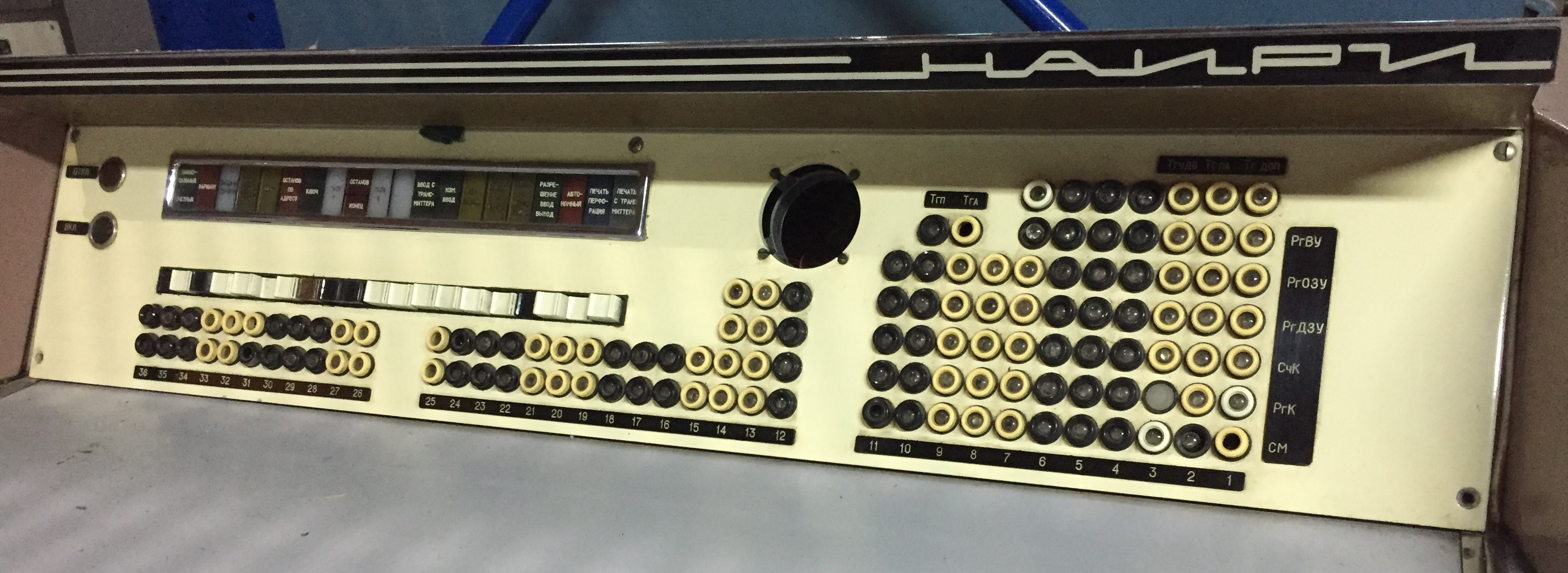
Nairi computer central panel

The first Nairi (Armenian: Նաիրի, Russian: Наири) computer was developed and launched into production in 1964, at the Yerevan Research Institute of Mathematical Machines (Yerevan, Armenia), and were chiefly designed by Hrachya Ye. Hovsepyan. In 1965, a modified version called Nairi-M, and in 1967 versions called Nairi-S and Nairi-2, were developed. Nairi-3 and Nairi-3-1, which used integrated hybrid chips, were developed in 1970. These computers were used for a wide class of tasks in a variety of areas, including Mechanical Engineering and the Economics.

In 1971, the developers of the Nairi computer were awarded the State Prize of the USSR.

== Nairi-1 ==
The development of the machine began in 1962, completed in 1964. The chief designer is Hrachya Yesaevich Hovsepyan, the leading design engineer is Mikhail Artavazdovich Khachatryan.

The architectural solution used in this machine has been patented in England, Japan, France and Italy.

=== Specification ===
- The processor is 36-bit.
- The clock frequency is 50 kHz.
- ROM (in the original documentation - DZU (long-term memory) of a cassette type, the volume of the cassette is 2048 words of 36 bits each; was used to store firmware (2048 72-bit cells) and firmware (12288 36-bit cells). Part of the ROM it was delivered "empty", with the ability for users to flash their most frequently used programs, thus getting rid of entering programs from the remote control or punched tape.
- The amount of RAM is 1024 words (8 cassettes of 128 cells), plus 5 registers.
- Operations speed on addition on fixed-point numbers - 2-3 thousand ops / s, multiplication - 100 ops / s, operations on floating point numbers - 100 ops / s.

Since 1964, the machine has been produced at two factories in Armenia, as well as at the Kazan computer plant (from 1964 to 1970, about 500 machines were produced in total). In the spring of 1965, the computer was presented at a fair in Leipzig, Germany.

There were a number machine's modifications:

"Nairi-M" (1965) - the photoreader FS-1501 and the tape puncher PL-80 were introduced into the periphery.

"Nairi-K" with increased RAM up to 4096 words.

"Nairi-S" (1967), an electrified typewriter Consul-254 was used as a terminal.

== Nairi-2 ==
Created in 1966, in fact, it is a modification of the Nairi-1 machine. The amount of RAM, made on ferrite rings, has been increased to 2048 36-bit words, more efficient input-output devices were used, which were included in the Nairi-K package. A modification "Nairi-2E" was also produced, specialized for the automation of experiments. It contained in its kit a magnetic tape drive NML-67 and an interface unit with measuring equipment.

== Nairi-3 ==
Nairi-3 was the first Soviet third generation computer. Of all the models of the Nairi computer systems, the micro-program control principles of the Nairi-1 were improved and expanded on the most in the Nairi-3 models. Through the advances in computer technology since the initial production year of 1964, it became possible for upwards of 128 thousand micro-instructions to be stored at one time. Not to mention the reduction in access times due to advances in the manufacture process of the components. This enabled for a Multilingual Computing structure, and time-sharing modes with simultaneous access of up to 64 terminals and 64 virtual machines Nairi-2; which could all perform the functions of one computer.

The processing power of the Nairi-3 was considerably higher than competing systems due to multiple storage system improvements. Some of which includes the usage of a long-term form of read-only memory to store the computer's firmware, on a sampling cycle of 8 μs, while on other, similar systems, the firmware as well as external, foreign programs were stored on external storage devices, such as magnetic drums, the predecessor to modern day hard drives.

A feature of the proposed computer architecture for a model of the Nairi-3 computer systems was the use of a permanent, non-volatile memory cassette tape, the main functional block of the ROM device was the storage, which consisted of YAN-9 accumulator cells.

For the first time, microprogram emulation of a computer of a different type was implemented, with a different command system: on Nairi-3 it was possible to execute programs for Minsk-22, or Razdan-3.

== Nairi-4 ==
A series of computers for special applications. Nairi 4 ARM / Nairi 4 and Nairi 41 were developed in 1974-1981. Their development started by Hrachya Ye. Hovsepyan. Lastly their chief designer is German Artashesovich Oganyan. The system was software-compatible with the PDP-11 and the SM series of computers.

In 1980-1981, the development of Nairi 4V and Nairi 4V / C was also carried out, the chief designers were V. Karapetyan and Hakob E. Sargsyan.
