= Jean Claude =

French Protestant (1619–1687)

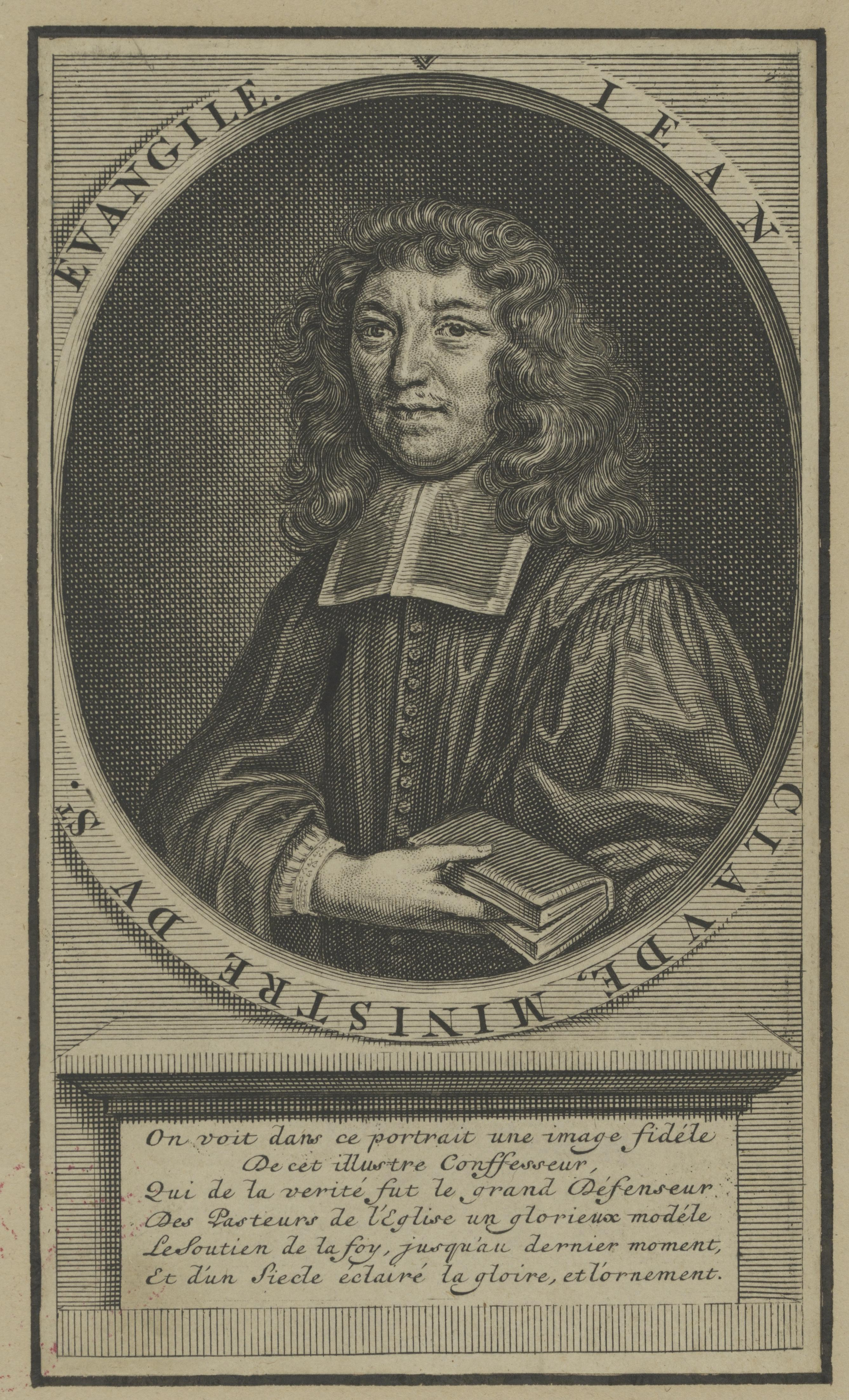
Jean Claude

Jean Claude (French: [klod]; 1619 – 13 January 1687) was a French Reformed theologian.

== Biography ==
Claude was born in La Sauvetat-du-Dropt near Agen. After studying at Montauban, Jean Claude entered the ministry in 1645. For eight years he was professor of theology in the Protestant college of Nîmes; but in 1661, having successfully opposed a scheme for re-uniting Catholics and Protestants, he was forbidden to preach in Lower Languedoc. In 1662 he obtained a post at Montauban similar to that which he had lost, but four years later he was removed from there as well. Next he became pastor at Charenton near Paris, where he engaged in controversies with Pierre Nicole (Réponse aux deux traités intitulés la perpétuité de la foi, 1665), Antoine Arnauld (Réponse au livre de M. Arnauld, 1670), and J.B. Bossuet (Réponse au livre de M. l'évêque de Meaux, 1683).

On the revocation of the edict of Nantes in 1685 Jean Claude fled to the Netherlands where he received a pension from stadtholder William of Orange, who commissioned him to write an account of the persecuted Huguenots (Plaintes des protestants cruellement opprimés dans le royaume de France, 1686). The book was translated into English, but by order of James II of England, both the translation and the original were publicly burnt by the common hangman on 5 May 1686, as containing "expressions scandalous to His Majesty the king of France."

Other works by Jean Claude were Réponse au livre de P. Nouet sur l'eucharistie (1668) and Œuvres posthumes (Amsterdam, 1688), containing the Traité de la composition d'un sermon, translated into English in 1778.

He died in The Hague.
