= Claude Lancelot =

French Jansenist monk and grammarian

Claude Lancelot (English: /lænsəˈloʊ/ lan-sə-LOH, French: [klod lɑ̃slo]; c. 1615 – 1695) was a French Jansenist monk and grammarian.

Lancelot was born in Paris. He participated in the creation of the Petites écoles de Port-Royal in May 1638 (then under the spiritual guidance of Jean Duvergier de Hauranne, the abbot of Saint-Cyran). Lancelot was in charge of the education of the duke of Chevreuse and of the princes of Conti. From 1638 until 1660, Lancelot continued to be associated with the religious community around the Abbey of Port-Royal-des-Champs.

Lancelot authored Nouvelle méthode pour apprendre la langue latine or New Method of Learning Latin (1644); Nouvelle méthode pour apprendre la langue grecque or New Method of Learning Greek (1655); Jardin des racines grecques or Garden of Greek Roots (1657), first published under the name Racines Grecques de Port-Royal; and, with Antoine Arnauld, Grammaire générale et raisonnée or General and Rational Grammar (1660), otherwise known as the Port-Royal Grammar.

In early 1660, Lancelot was forced to leave the Abbey, and was ultimately exiled to Brittany.

Lancelot died near the Holy-Cross Abbey, in Quimperlé, in 1695.
