= Port-Royal Logic =

1662 textbook on logic

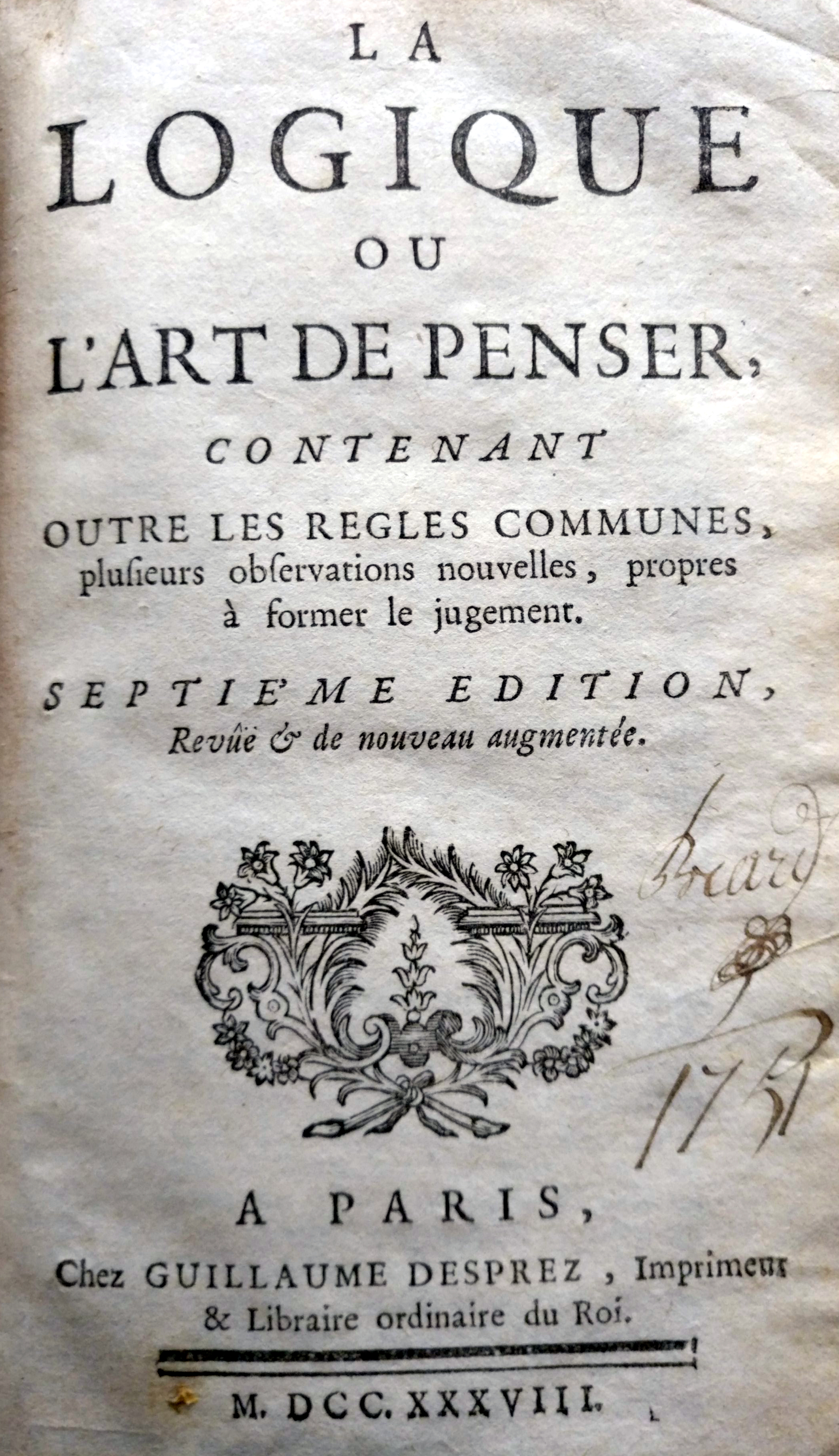
Seventh, 1738, edition of Port-Royal Logic

Port-Royal Logic, or Logique de Port-Royal, is the common name of La logique, ou l'art de penser, an important textbook on logic first published anonymously in 1662 by Antoine Arnauld and Pierre Nicole, two prominent members of the Jansenist movement, centered on Port-Royal. Blaise Pascal likely contributed considerable portions of the text. Its linguistic companion piece is the Port-Royal Grammar (1660) by Arnauld and Lancelot.

The book helped popularize the concept that a definition with more qualifications or features (the intension) denotes a class with fewer members (the extension), and vice versa. It was based on Aristotle's ideas about genus and species. The same concept would later become a fundamental element in the works of Gottfried Wilhelm Leibniz.

== Use as a textbook on Cartesian metaphysics and epistemology ==
Written in French, it became quite popular and was in use up to the twentieth century, introducing the reader to logic, and exhibiting strong Cartesian elements in its metaphysics and epistemology (Arnauld had been one of the main philosophers whose objections were published, with replies, in Descartes' Meditations on First Philosophy). The Port-Royal Logic is sometimes cited as a paradigmatic example of traditional term logic.

== Impact ==
According to Ian Hacking, the book was the "most influential logic book after Aristotle and before the end of the nineteenth century".

The philosopher Louis Marin particularly studied it in the 20th century (La Critique du discours, Éditions de Minuit, 1975), while Michel Foucault considered it, in The Order of Things, as one of the bases of the classical épistémè.

Among the contributions of the Port-Royal Logic is the popularization of the distinction between comprehension and extension, which would later become a more refined distinction between intension and extension. Roughly speaking: a definition with more qualifications or features (the intension) denotes a class with fewer members (the extension), and vice versa. The main idea traces back through the scholastic philosophers to Aristotle's ideas about genus and species, and is fundamental in the philosophy of Leibniz.

More recently, it has been related to mathematical lattice theory in formal concept analysis, and independently formalized similarly by Yu. Schreider's group in Moscow, Jon Barwise & Jerry Seligman in Information Flow, and others.

== Bibliography ==
- Arnauld, Antoine, and Pierre Nicole. La logique ou l’Art de penser. 1st ed. Paris: Jean Guignart, Charles Savreux, & Jean de Lavnay, 1662.
- Arnauld, Antoine, and Pierre Nicole. La logique ou l’Art de penser, contenant, outre les regles communes, plusieurs observations nouvelles, propres à former le jugement. 6th ed. Amsterdam: Abraham Wolfgang, 1685.
- Arnauld, Antoine, and Pierre Nicole. Logic; or, The Art of Thinking. Translated by Several Hands. 1st ed. London: H. Sawbridge, 1685.
- Arnauld, Antoine, and Pierre Nicole. Logic; or, The Art of Thinking. Translated by John Ozell. London: William Taylor, 1717.
- Arnauld, Antoine, and Pierre Nicole. The Art of Thinking; Port-Royal Logic. Translated, with an introduction by James Dickoff and Patricia James, and a foreword by Charles W. Hendel. Indianapolis: Bobbs-Merrill, 1964.
- Arnauld, Antoine, and Pierre Nicole. Logic or the Art of Thinking. Translated by Jill V. Buroker. Cambridge: Cambridge University Press, 1996.
