= Nicolas Desmarets =

French Controller-General of Finances (1648–1721)

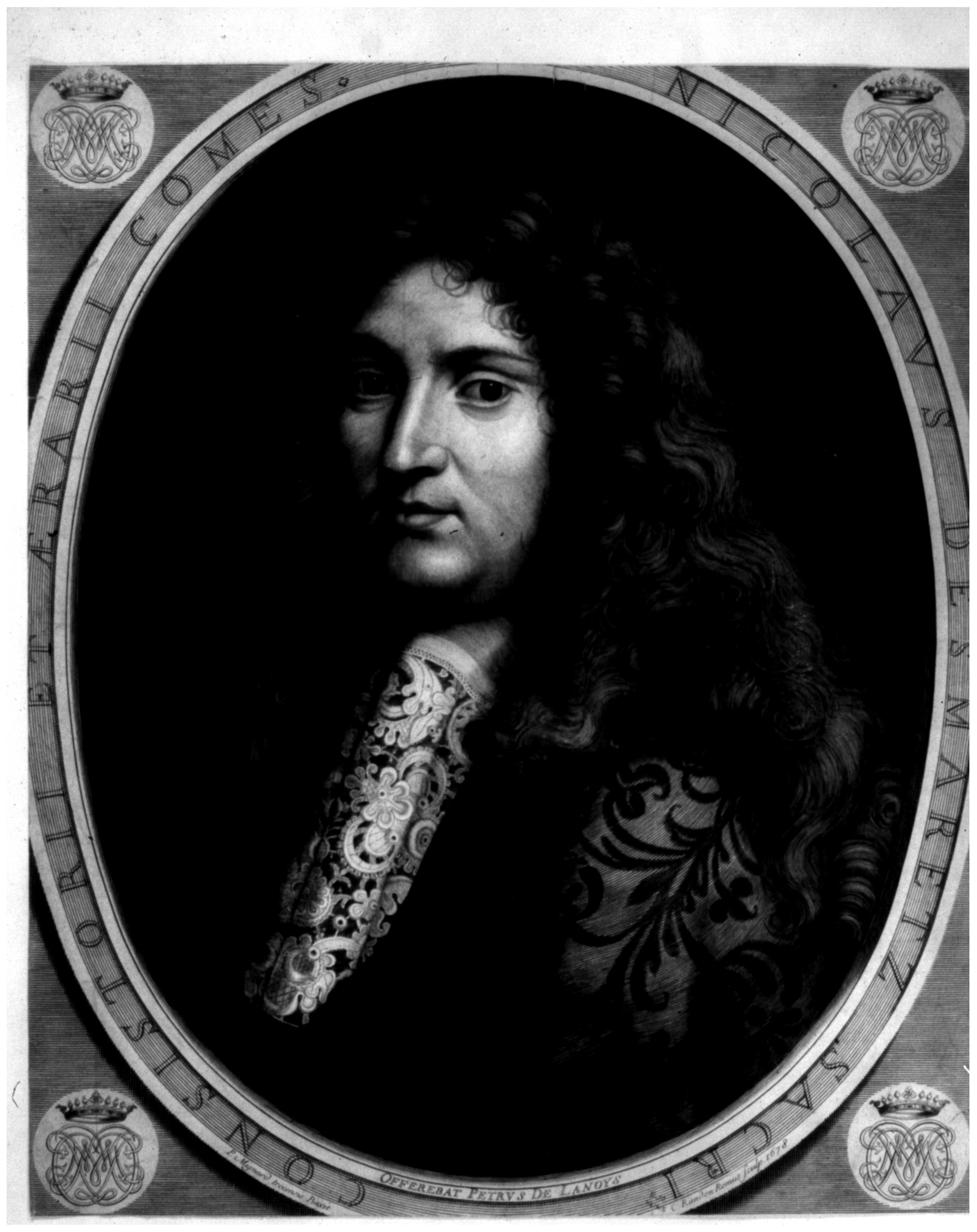
Nicolas Desmaretz Signature Nicolas Desmarets (1648-1721)

Nicolas Desmaretz, marquis de Maillebois (10 September 1648, Paris – 4 May 1721, Paris) was a French Controller-General of Finances during the reign of Louis XIV. Desmaretz was a nephew of Jean-Baptiste Colbert. Taken out of school at age 15 to work in his uncle's offices as Controller-General of Finances, he rose to become an intendant of finances in 1678 and his uncle's principal assistant in 1683. In these last functions he had to treat with the financiers for the coinage of new silver pieces of four sous.

After Colbert's death he was involved in the legal proceedings taken against those financiers who had manufactured coins of bad alloy, and was accused of taking bribes and kickbacks. The prosecution, conducted by the members of the family of Le Tellier, rivals of the Colberts, presented no proof against Desmarets. Nevertheless he was stripped of his offices and exiled to his estates by the king, on 23 December 1683. After returning to Paris in 1686, Desmaretz wrote a series of memoranda for his family members who were still in the government recommending new tax policies in the face of the deplorable economic situation of France.

As early as 1687 he showed the necessity for radical reforms in the system of taxation, insisting on the ruin of the people and the excessive expenses of the king. By these memoirs he established his claim to a place among the great French economists of the time, Vauban, Boisguilbert and Henri de Boulainvilliers. When in September 1699 Michel Chamillart was named controller-general of finances, he took Desmarets for counsellor; and when he created the two offices of directors of finances, he gave one to Desmarets (22 October 1703). Henceforth Desmarets was essentially minister of finance. Louis XIV had long conversations with him, Madame de Maintenon protected him, and Vauban and Boisguilbert exchanged long conversations with him.

Desmaretz replaced Michel Chamillart as controller general in 1708. The situation was exceedingly grave. The revenues of 1708 fell far short of expenses, and a 1709 famine reduced the return from taxes even more. Yet Desmarets's reputation renewed the credit of the state, and financiers consented to advance money they had refused to the king. Desmaretz undertook several policies aimed at restoring France's financial status while in office, including postponing repayment of loans, securing lower interest rates on certain loans, creating a royal lottery, devaluing metal currency, and instituting a ten percent tax on the income produced by property ownership in 1710. Desmaretz was working on a method for repaying France's debts when Louis XIV died on 1 September 1715. He was dismissed from office after Louis XIV's death, along with all the other ministers, and retired to his estates.

His son Jean-Baptiste François des Marets, marquis de Maillebois became a Marshal of France in 1741.
