= Razdan (computer) =

Family of old soviet general-purpose digital electronic computers produces in 1960's

Razdan is a family of general-purpose, digital electronic computers created from 1958 to 1965 at the Yerevan Computer Research and Development Institute (YerNIIMM). The computer has a semiconductor element base, that is, it belongs to computers of the second generation.

== Razdan ==
The machine has been developed since 1958, based on the documentation for the M-3 machine (created under the direction of N.Ya.Matyukhin in the laboratory of I. S. Bruk). The head of the work is E. L. Brusilovsky.

In 1960, the Razdan machine was handed over to the State Commission.

=== Machine specifications ===
- Command system: two-address, 17 basic commands, each of which has 8 modifications
- Number system: binary, the word consists of 36 binary digits, of which 29 are the mantissa, 1 is the sign, 5 is the order, 1 is the sign of the order.
- Speed: 5000 ops/sec.
- Power consumption: approx. 3 kW from AC 220/380 V, 50 Hz.
- Occupied area: 20 sq. m.

In parallel with the assembly and adjustment of Razdan, in the same research institute, work was underway on the creation of the "Aragats" computer, which has the same architecture. To assist in the creation of Razdan and Aragats, several employees of the Computing Center of the Academy of Sciences were seconded to Yerevan, the head of the group was A. P. Merenkov.

== Razdan-2 ==
Serially produced since 1961.

Entering and storing data and code is on perforated 35mm film.

== Razdan-3 ==
Put into operation in 1965, serial production of the machine began in 1966.

Used as a control computer for working with scientific equipment. in nuclear research.

There were several scientific programming languages compiled for it such as Fortran and Algol-60.

On the basis of this model, in 1967–1977 YerNIIMM developed a system for automating the process of selling railway tickets – the Marshrut-1 complex (chief designer – A. Kuchukyan). This complex was used for a long time at several railway stations in Moscow (and later formed the basis of the first generation Express automated control system). The developers of this system received the State Prize of the Armenian SSR in 1974.
