= Yerevan Computer Research and Development Institute =

Research institute in Armenia

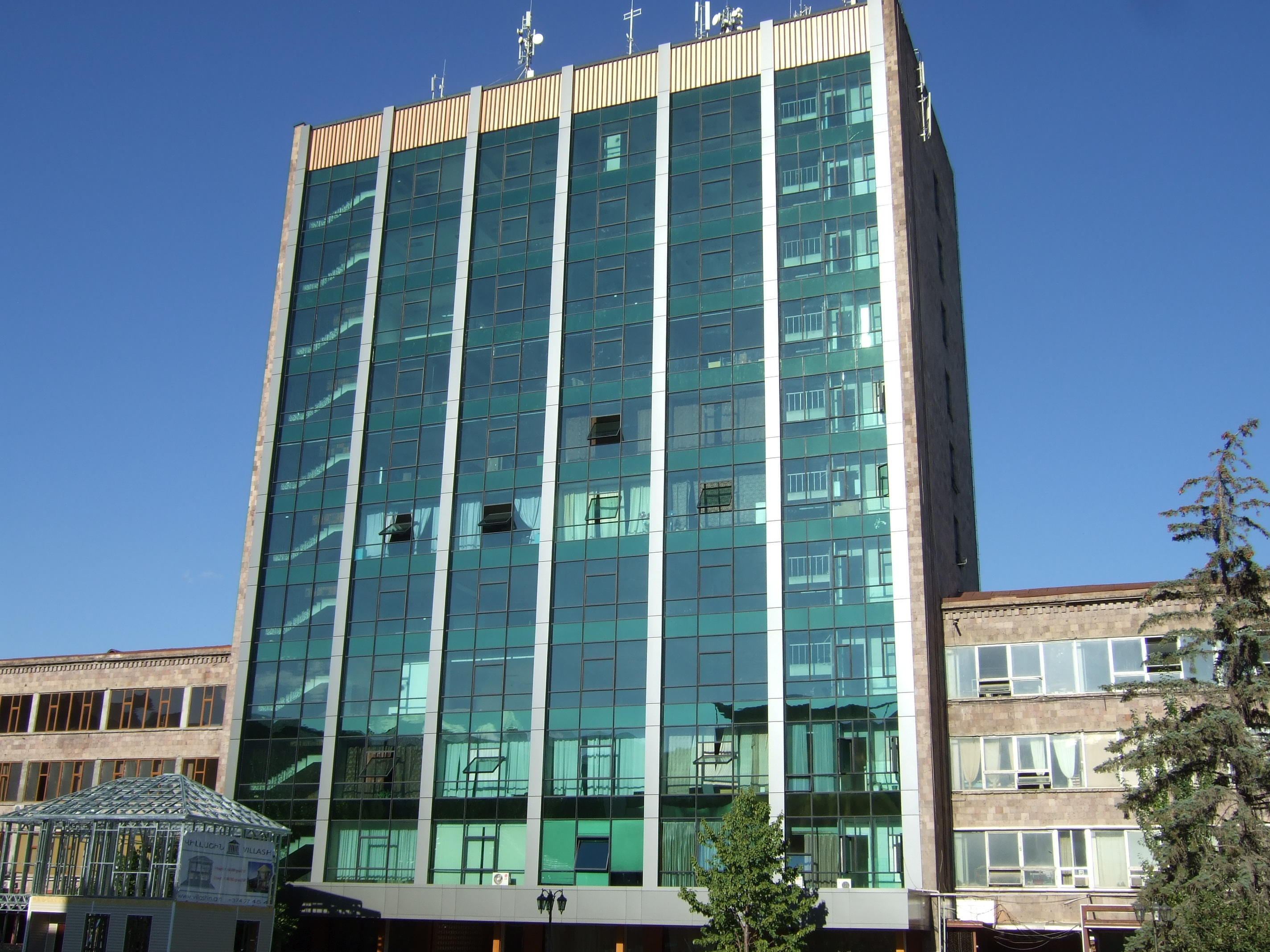
- Established: 1956
- Field of research: Information technology; Software
- Director: Romik Harutyunyan, General Director
- Location: Yerevan, Armenia
- Website: www.mergelyan.com

The Yerevan Computer Research and Development Institute (YCRDI) (Armenian: Երևանի մաթեմատիկական մեքենաների գիտահետազոտական ինստիտուտ (ԵրՄՄԳՀԻ) (Yerevani mat'ematikakan mekenaneri gitahetazotakan institut (YerMMGHI))), is a scientific research institute and the pioneer of the IT and software industry in Armenia. It was founded by the government of USSR in 1956 in Yerevan for the development of computer equipment. The institution is currently involved in the development of computers and automatic control systems for civil and defense purposes. At the beginning of the 1990s, the institute employed over 7,000 staff.

Products produced by the YCRDI include:

- Measurement and control system for various utility distribution networks, such as electrical, natural gas, water, and thermal energy networks, for measurement, control, and management purposes.
- Communication security systems for government agencies and commercial banks.
- Management information systems for social security, health care, pension, and other government agencies and organizations.
- Optical character recognition and text-to-speech systems

== History ==
The Institute of Mathematical Machines in Yerevan was founded on the initiative of Academicians V. Ambartsumyan, A. Shahinyan and A. Iosifyan. It opened in June 1956 and became part of the Ministry of Automation and Instrumentation. The institute was tasked with creating computers and control systems based on them.

In the next few years, the structural formation of the institute took place: there were divisions responsible for the development of hardware software, pilot production. In 1957–1958, the first major work was carried out: the modernization of the M-3 computer.

From the late 1950s to the early 1990s, the Institute developed and manufactured several computer models, including the Nairi family, the EC series of computers, and special computing systems, at the YerNIIMM Pilot Plant, which combined production facilities. Serial production of computers was carried out at the Kazan Computer Plant, the Baku Computer Plant, the Electron Plant, the Vinnitsa Radio Engineering Plant, the Bulgarian Electronics Plant in Sofia and other enterprises.

By the beginning of the 1990s, the staff of the institute, taking into account the pilot production, reached 7,000 people. For his achievements, he was awarded the Order of the Red Banner of Labor, two Lenin Prizes, and the employees of the institute repeatedly became laureates of the USSR State Prize, the State Prize of Armenia, the Lenin Komsomol Prizes of the USSR and Armenia.

In 1989, the Institute became the head organization of the Sevan Research and Production Association.

In 1992, part of the institute's divisions separated into a separate organization – the Yerevan Research Institute of Automated Control Systems (attached back in 2010).

In 2002, the institute became the property of Russia, and in 2008 it was transferred to the Russian company Sitronics.

== CEO ==
Sergei Mergelyan (1956–1960)

Gurgen Sargsyan (1960–1963)

Fadey Sargsyan (1963–1977)

M. Semerjyan (1977–1987)

Hakob Sargsyan (1987–1989)

Grigor Karapetyan (1989–1992)

Hakob Sargsyan (1992–1994)

Sargis Sargsyan (1994–1999)

Gagik Hovhannisyan (1999–2011)

Arsen Taroyan (2011–2020)

Romik F. Harutyunyan (2020)

== Notable products ==
In 1957, YerNIIM received an order to modernize the M-3 computer. The machine was significantly accelerated, its speed increased from 30 operations per second to 3000, on its basis, later, the Aragats and Razdan computers were created – the first semiconductor computer in the USSR. On the basis of the Razdan-3 computer, the Yerevan scientists created the Marshrut-1 computer, which formed the basis of the all-Union system for automating the sale of railway tickets ACS "Express".

Later, the following computer systems were developed at YerNIIM:

Computer "Yerevan"

Computer series "Nairi"

Computer "Wave"

Computer "Korund"

Computer "Kanaz" (for the Kanaker aluminum plant)

Computer "Census" (for processing the results of the USSR census)

Computer "Carpet"

ES 1030

ES 1040

ES 1046

== See also ==
- Nairi computer system
