= Petites écoles de Port-Royal =

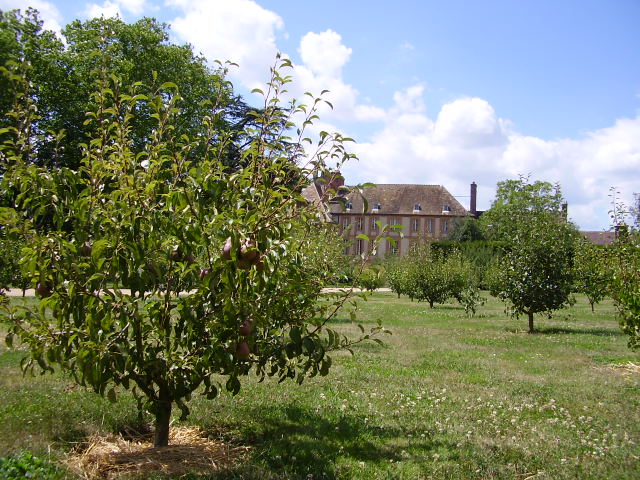
In the orchards of Port-Royal, the building housing the Petites écoles in the 17th century (before its 19th-century extension which now houses the site's museum)

The Petites écoles de Port-Royal was the name given to a teaching system set up in 1637 by the intellectuals who gathered at Port-Royal-des-Champs in the middle of the 17th century at the height of the Jansenist controversy. They functioned from 1637 to 1660.

== Origin ==
The monastery of Port-Royal-des-Champs was more or less abandoned in favour of that in Paris (for health reasons - the site was malarial) when in 1637 Jean Duvergier de Hauranne, abbot of Saint-Cyran, decided to set up a school for 30 children here, headed by his friend, the priest Antoine Singlin. This school shared the building with the Solitaires, intellectuals or politicians who had decided to go into retreat to perfect their spiritual life, many of whom taught at the school.

Its teachers' intellectual calibre made Petites écoles de Port-Royal a place of intellectual excellence, but also of experimentation in teaching methods (based on French and not Latin and thus revolutionary for the time) and in normalization of the French language. They also withdrew from the Jesuit teaching system, which mainly taught in Latin, even when their young students had not mastered Latin. Class sizes were small (never more than 25 children) to create a teacher-pupil relationship that was very strict but also marked by trust and admiration. Discipline was very severe, but many of its teaching rules demonstrate a real concern for what would later be called child psychology.

== Students and teachers ==
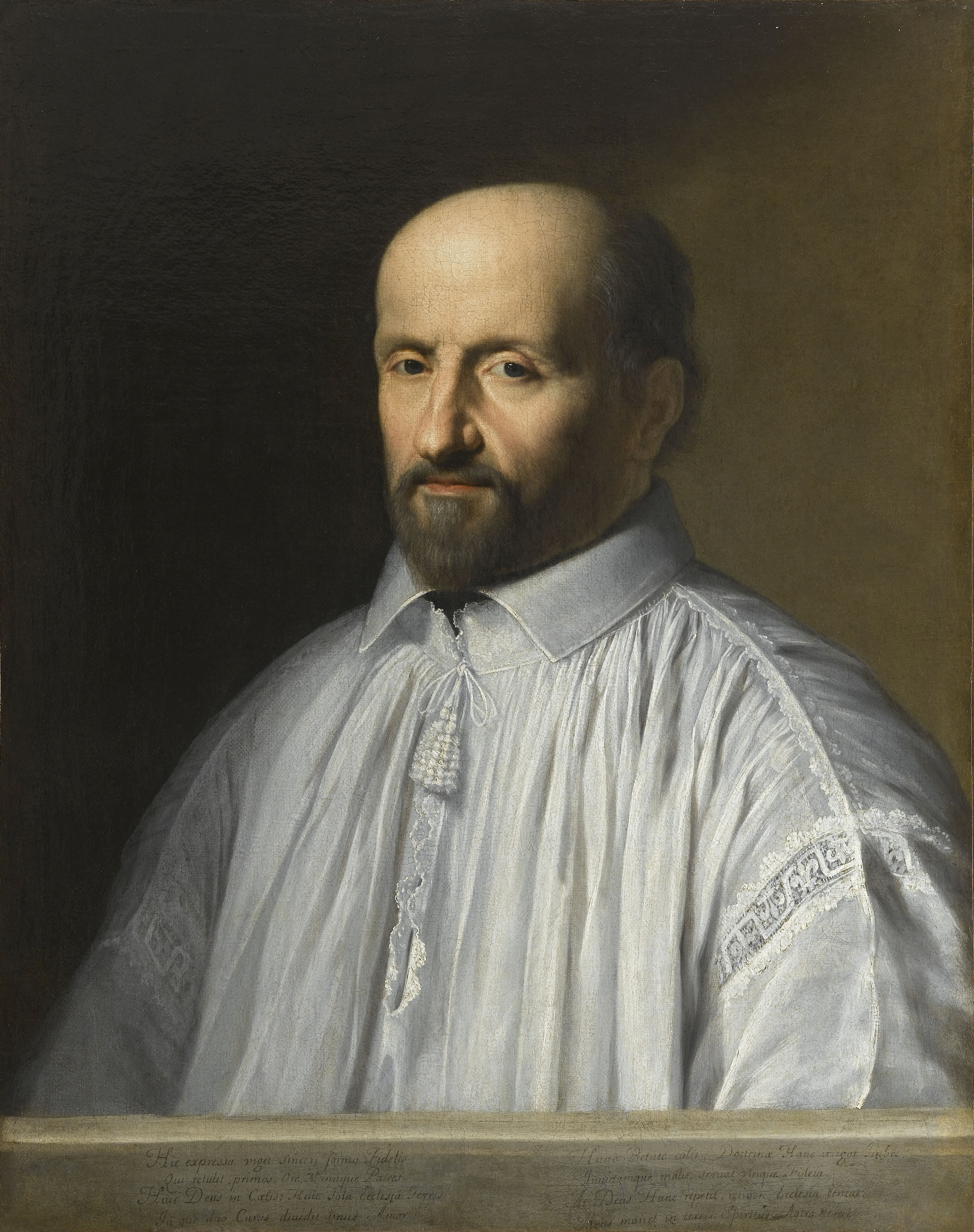
Jean Duvergier de Hauranne (Saint-Cyran)

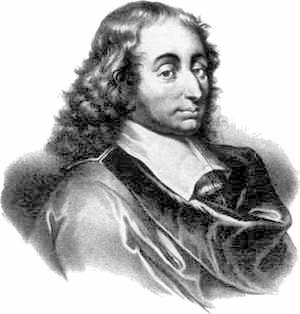
Blaise Pascal

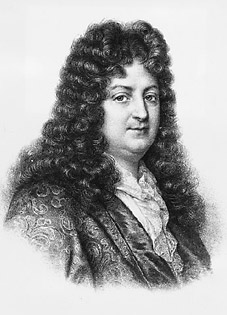
Jean Racine

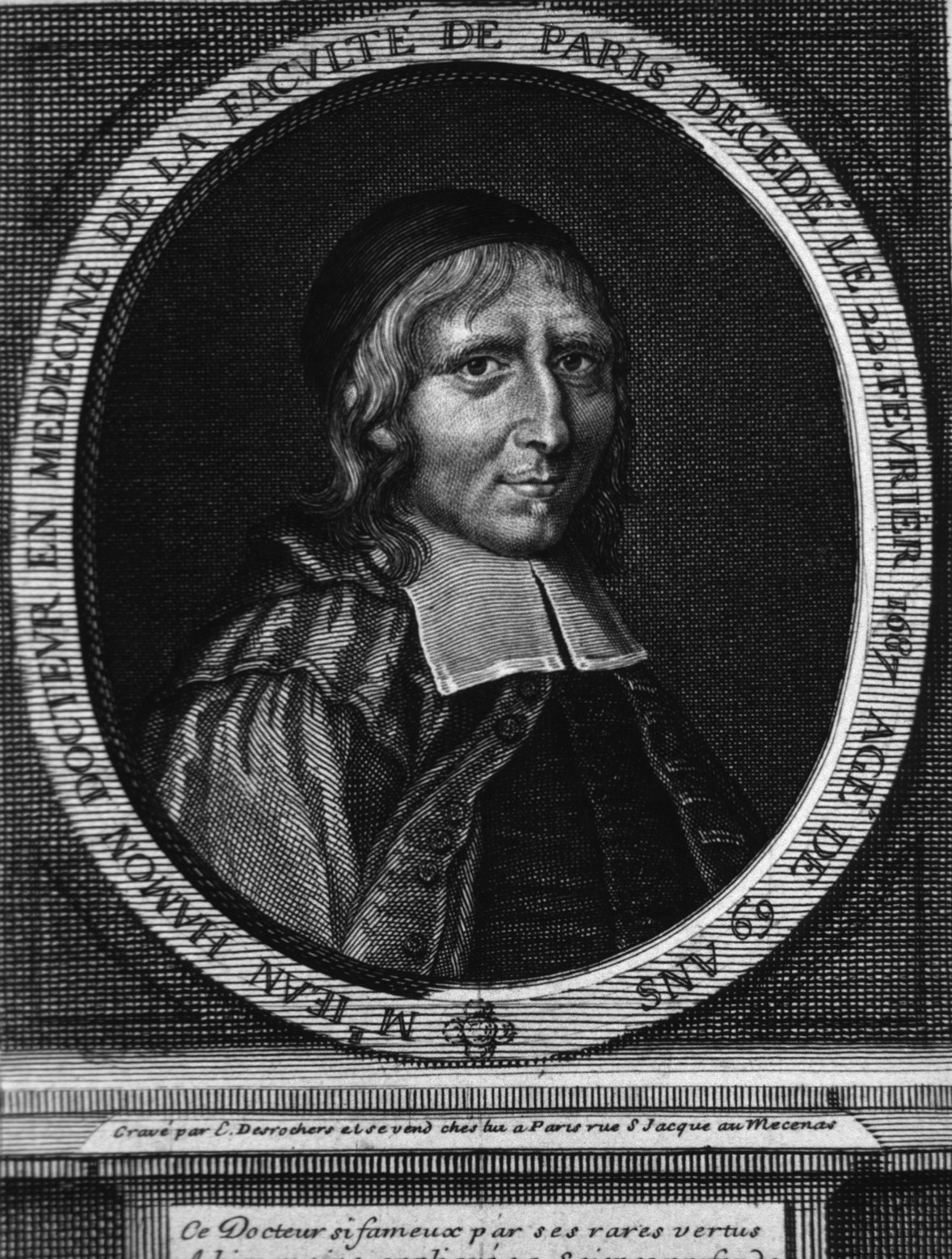
Jean Hamon

Its teachers were drawn from among the major intellectuals of the time:

- Blaise Pascal, who wrote a new method of teaching children to read
- Claude Lancelot, who wrote the famous Grammaire de Port-Royal, foundational text for the normalization of the French language
- Pierre Nicole, moralist and logician
- Jean Hamon, doctor and classicist

Students:

- Jean Racine attended 1655–1666, who became a famous French playwright;
- Pierre Le Pesant de Boisguilbert who became a famous economist;
- Elizabeth Hamilton, Irish refugee, attended c. 1652 – c. 1660, who would be admired as a beauty at Whitehall and at Versailles;
- Helen Muskerry, Irish refugee, attended c. 1652 - c. 1660.

== Notes and references ==
- Clark, Ruth (1921), Anthony Hamilton: his Life and Works and his Family, London: John Lane
- Delforge, Frédéric (1985), Les petites Écoles de Port-Royal, Paris: Cerf
- Sainte-Beuve, Charles-Augustin (1878), Port-Royal, vol. 2 (4 ed.), Paris: Hachette
