= Julius Schreider =

Soviet and Russian mathematician (1927–1998)

Julius Anatolyevich Schreider OP (Russian: Юлий Анатольевич Шрейдер, romanized: Iulii Anatol'evich Shreider; 28 October 1927 – 24 August 1998) was a Soviet and Russian mathematician, cyberneticist, philosopher, and a convert to Roman Catholicism.

== Education and research work ==
Schreider was born in Dnepropetrovsk, Soviet Union. In 1946, he graduated from the renowned Mechanics and Mathematics Faculty of Moscow State University. He completed his doctoral work in 1949 and in 1950 completed his postdoctoral dissertation on functional analysis.

Schreider worked for several years in various scientific and mathematical training institutes in Moscow, before moving to the department of semiotics of the All-Russian Institute of Scientific and Technical Information at the Russian Academy of Sciences in 1961, where he remained until 1989. Schrader conducted foundational work in the early days of computer science and was appointed one of the Institute's Professors of Informatics in 1984.

In 1960 Schreider became interested in religion and philosophy, eventually devoting significant time to the formal study of philosophy and obtaining a doctorate in philosophy In 1981.

He wrote a number of books on both mathematics and philosophy, including "Equality, the Similarity of the Order" (1970), "Systems and Models" (1980), "The Nature of Biological Knowledge" (1991), "Fundamentals of Ethics" (1993), and "The Values That We Choose" (1999). He also published numerous articles, including in the journal "Problems of Philosophy". Several of his and his students' papers on the mathematics of concept hierarchies and mereology were published in English translation in the journal Automatic Documentation and Mathematical Linguistics (a translation of the journal Научно-Tехническая Информация; Nauchno-Tekhnicheskaya Informatsiya).

In 1989, Schreider moved to a permanent job at the Institute for Information Transmission Problems at the Russian Academy of Sciences. He taught at Moscow State University in the Mechanics and Mathematics Department and the Department of Structural and Applied Linguistics at the Faculty of Philology. He has published about 800 papers.

== Conversion to Roman Catholicism ==
In 1970, Schreider was baptized in the Roman Catholic Church, an uncommon occurrence in the secular culture of the Soviet Union. In 1977, he joined the Third Order of the Dominican Order (Saint Dominic). Schreider's religious conversion resulted in his expulsion from the Communist Party and his demotion from the Institute.

In 1989 he became one of the organizers of the Catholic club "Spiritual Dialogue" and was elected its chairman. Since 1993 he was Academician-Secretary of the "Science and Theology" Department of the Russian Academy of Natural Sciences and chairman of the board of the Center of Philosophy, Psychology and Sociology of Religion.

In 1991, Schreider became Professor of the College of Catholic Theology of Saint Thomas Aquinas, and in 1996 Professor of the Biblical Theological Institute of Saint Andrew in the city of Moscow, where he taught courses on "Ethics," "Social Doctrine of the Church", and "Logic and Epistemology", among others. He was received by Pope John Paul II.

== From the memoirs of contemporaries ==
Julius Schreider's colleague at the Institute, V.B. Borschev recalled: "Oh it was legendary. He was a child prodigy, finishing school by the age of 14 and university in three years. While still at university, he came to Gelfand with a solution to the Continuum Problem. Gelfand found one small error, but the solution proposed by Schreider was interesting, and later became the basis of his doctoral dissertation. Schreider was admitted to graduate school despite massive antisemitism because one of the eminent professors insisted. After graduation, they still forced him out of the university despite a brilliant dissertation. Antisemitism, alas, has not gone away."

== General information ==
Schreider wrote poetry exploring philosophical and theological themes. He was a friend of Varlam Shalamov and corresponded with him regularly.
