= Viktor Ambartsumian =

Soviet Armenian astrophysicist (1908–1996)

- Վիկտոր Համբարձումյան
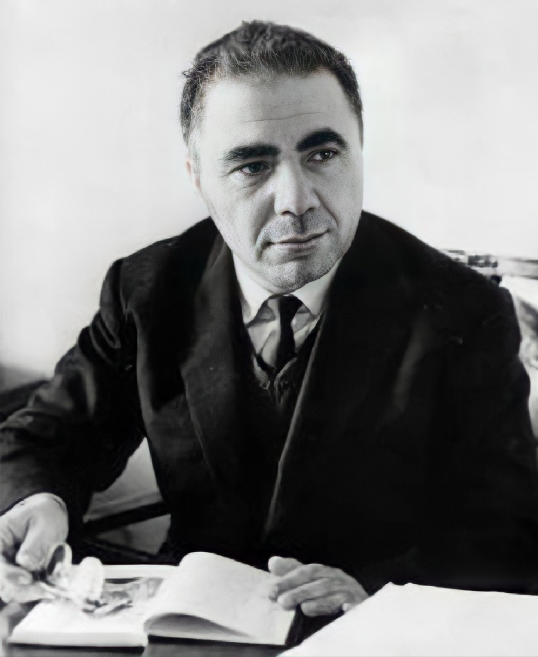
- Ambartsumian in 1968
- Born: 18 September [O.S. 5 September] 1908; Tiflis, Russian Empire
- Died: 12 August 1996 (aged 87); Byurakan, Armenia
- Resting place: Byurakan Observatory
- Citizenship: Russian Empire; Soviet Union; Armenia
- Education: Leningrad State University
- Known for: Stellar association
- Spouse: Vera Klochikhina (m. 1930; died 1995)
- Children: 4, including Rouben
- Awards: Stalin prize (1949, 1950); Gold Medal of the Royal Astronomical Society (1960); Bruce Medal (1960); ForMemRS (1969); Lomonosov Gold Medal (1971); National Hero of Armenia (1994); State Prize of Russia (1995)
- Scientific career
- Fields: Astrophysics
- Workplaces: Leningrad State University; Pulkovo Observatory; Yerevan State University; Byurakan Observatory
- Thesis: None (Note: Ambartsumian did not defend a doctoral thesis. He was awarded a doctoral degree in 1935 based on his scientific work hitherto.)
- Doctoral advisor: Aristarkh Belopolsky
- Doctoral students: Viktor Sobolev, Benjamin Markarian, Grigor Gurzadyan

Signature
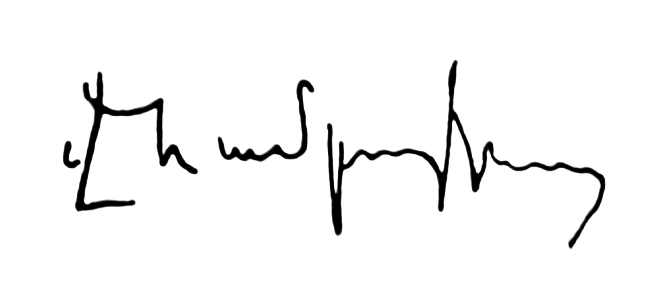

Viktor Amazaspovich Ambartsumian (Note: Ambartsumian is the most commonly accepted spelling of his last name in English. It comes from the Russified version of his Armenian last name, which, using the standard romanization, is transliterated as Hambardzumyan (-ian). Less common spellings of his last name include Ambarzumian (used until the 1930s) and Ambartsumyan (commonly used in Soviet publications).) (Russian: Виктор Амазаспович Амбарцумян; Armenian: Վիկտոր Համազասպի Համբարձումյան, Viktor Hamazaspi Hambardzumyan; 18 September [O.S. 5 September] 1908 – 12 August 1996) was a Soviet and Armenian astrophysicist and science administrator. One of the 20th century's leading astronomers, he is widely regarded as the founder of theoretical astrophysics in the Soviet Union.

Educated at Leningrad State University (LSU) and the Pulkovo Observatory, Ambartsumian taught at LSU and founded the Soviet Union's first department of astrophysics there in 1934. He subsequently moved to Soviet Armenia, where he founded the Byurakan Observatory in 1946. It became his institutional base for the decades to come and a major center of astronomical research. He also co-founded the Armenian Academy of Sciences and led it for almost half a century—the entire post-war period. One commentator noted that "science in Armenia was synonymous with the name Ambartsumian." In 1965 Ambartsumian founded the journal Astrofizika and served as its editor for over 20 years.

Ambartsumian began retiring from the various positions he held only from the age of 80. He died at his house in Byurakan and was buried on the grounds of the observatory. He was awarded the title of National Hero of Armenia in 1994.

== Background ==
Ambartsumian was born in Tiflis (present-day Tbilisi, Georgia) on 18 September [O.S. 5 September] 1908, to Armenian parents Hripsime Khakhanian (1885–1972) and Hamazasp Hambardzumyan (1880–1966). Hripsime's father was an Armenian Apostolic priest from Tskhinvali, while Hamazasp hailed from Vardenis (Basargechar). His ancestors had moved from Diyadin, what is now Turkey, to the southern shores of Lake Sevan in 1830, in the aftermath of the Russo-Turkish War. Hamazasp (Note: Amazasp in Russian) was an educated man of letters who studied law at Saint Petersburg University. He was also a writer and translator and notably translated Homer's Iliad into Armenian from Classical Greek. In 1912 he co-founded the Caucasian Society of Armenian Writers, which lasted until 1921. Ambartsumian was the secretary, while Hovhannes Tumanyan, the famed poet, served as its president. Ambartsumian knew Tumanyan personally. In 1922, after the 14-year-old boy described Sirius to him, Tumanyan wrote a short poem about the star.

Ambartsumian's parents married in 1904. He had a brother, Levon, and sister, Gohar. Levon, a geophysics student, died at 23-24 while on an expedition in the Urals. Gohar (1907–1979) was a mathematician and Chair of Probability Theory and Mathematical Statistics at Yerevan State University towards the end of her life.

== Education ==
Ambartsumian developed an early interest in mathematics and was able to multiply by the age of 4. His interest in astronomy began with reading a Russian translation of a book by Ormsby M. Mitchel at 11. By his own account, he considered himself an astronomer by the age of 12. Between 1917 and 1924 he studied at Tiflis gymnasiums, where schooling was conducted in Russian and Armenian. In 1921 he transferred to gymnasium #4 to study under Nikolay Ignatievich Sudakov, a Moscow-educated astronomer, whom Ambartsumian called a "very serious teacher of astronomy." Ambartsumian worked with Sudakov at the school observatory the latter had built. At school, Ambartsumian wrote several papers on astronomy and delivered lectures on the origin of the Solar System and extraterrestrial life at "first in school and then in the various clubs and houses of culture" beginning at 12–13. In 1924 Ambartsumian delivered a lecture at Yerevan State University about the theory of relativity. He also met Ashot Hovhannisyan and Alexander Miasnikian, Armenia's communist leaders.

In 1924 Ambartsumian moved to Leningrad, where he began attending the Herzen Pedagogical Institute. Shakhbazyan suggests that his non-peasant, non-proletarian background prevented him from entering Leningrad State University (LSU). However, Ambartsumian explained in an interview that by the time he arrived in August, LSU's admissions were already closed. To avoid losing a year, he opted to study in the physics and mathematics department of the pedagogical institute. After one year, he transferred to LSU's physics and mathematics department. At university, Ambartsumian was interested in both astronomy and mathematics. "I loved mathematics, but at the same time I felt that my profession would be astronomy. Mathematics was like a hobby, but I did complete the full mathematics curriculum. Thus you could say that I graduated with a major in mathematics, but in fact it is recorded that I graduated as an astronomer," he said in an interview in 1987. At LSU among his professors were the physicist Orest Khvolson and mathematician Vladimir Smirnov. He studied alongside other major Soviet scientists such as Lev Landau, Sergei Sobolev, Sergey Khristianovich and George Gamow. In 1926 he published the first of his 16 scholarly papers as a student. He graduated in 1928, although he received his diploma only fifty years later—in 1978. His undergraduate thesis was "devoted to a study of radiative transfer radiative equilibrium." He completed his postgraduate studies at the Pulkovo Observatory under Aristarkh Belopolsky between 1928 and 1931.

== Career ==
=== Leningrad ===
After completing his postgraduate studies in 1931, Ambartsumian began working at the Pulkovo Observatory and teaching part-time at LSU. In 1931 Ambartsumian began reading the first course on theoretical astrophysics in the Soviet Union. He also served as Pulkovo's scientific secretary in 1931–32, which involved mostly administrative work. Ambartsumian later characterized Pulkovo as being a "very old institution, and for this reason there were certain elements of ossification and stagnation. Nevertheless, this was the best qualified astronomical institution in the Soviet Union."

In 1934 Ambartsumian was fired by Pulkovo director Boris Gerasimovich for alleged "laziness." Gerasimovich viewed Ambartsumian and other young astrophysicists as "undisciplined and in too much of a rush to publish untested theories and poorly documented research." Gerasimovich himself had a "tendency to non-cooperativeness." Gerasimovich was not taken seriously by them. When in 1934 Subrahmanyan Chandrasekhar visited Leningrad, he was told by Ambartsumian, "Look here, here is a set of papers by Gerasimovich. I turn to an arbitrary paper and to an arbitrary line. I am sure you will find a mistake." Chandrasekhar stated in 1977 that during his visit in 1934 Ambartsumian "was very free and very open. He was extremely critical of his seniors."

After leaving Pulkovo, Ambartsumian founded the first department of astrophysics in the Soviet Union at Leningrad State University in 1934. In 1934 he was named professor at LSU and in 1935 he was named doctor of physical-mathematical sciences without having to defend a thesis "based on his scientific work through that date." He headed the department until 1946 or 1947.

Between 1939 and 1941 Ambartsumian was the director of the Astronomical Observatory of LSU. He was simultaneously prorector (deputy president) of the university. Among his graduate students were Viktor Sobolev, Benjamin Markarian, Grigor Gurzadyan, and others. Ambartsumian considered Sobolev his "most brilliant graduate student."

Stalin's purges

Many of Ambartsumian's colleagues and friends suffered during the Great Purge under Stalin, most notably Nikolai Aleksandrovich Kozyrev (1908–83), with whom he became close friends in the mid-1920s. Kozyrev was sentenced to ten years in a forced-labor camp, but survived the repressions. Others such as Matvei Petrovich Bronstein and Pulkovo director Boris Gerasimovich did not survive. Ambartsumian's relations with Kozyrev were "strained for the remainder of his life." McCutcheon notes that while in the West some have questioned Ambartsumian's possible role in the terror, "there is no hard evidence to suggest that he was guilty of anything more serious than surviving at a time when others did not."

World War II

Ambartsumian led the evacuation of part of the faculty of Leningrad State University to Elabuga, Tatarstan in 1941, after the Nazi invasion of the Soviet Union. There a branch of LSU operated under Ambartsumian's leadership until 1944. He served as the dean of the branch.

=== Armenia ===
In 1943 Ambartsumian moved with his family to Yerevan, Soviet Armenia, where he lived until the end of his life. In the same year, he co-founded the Armenian Academy of Sciences along with scientists and scholars Hovsep Orbeli, Hrachia Acharian, Artem Alikhanian, Abram Alikhanov, Manuk Abeghian and others. He served as vice president of the academy until 1947 and as president from 1947 to 1993.

Since 1943 Ambartsumian served as director of the Yerevan Astronomical Observatory. The small observatory was affiliated with Yerevan State University. Ambartsumian had secured a nine-inch telescope from Leningrad for the observatory. Ambartsumian said that before the war "this observatory did not rise significantly above the level of amateur variable star observations. During the war they also carried out photographic observations of variable stars using a small camera." In 1945–1946 Ambartsumian founded the department of astrophysics at Yerevan State University (YSU). He was named professor of astrophysics at YSU in 1947. He served as chair of the department until 1994. (Note: The departments of astrophysics and general physics merged in 2009.)

In 1965 Ambartsumian founded the journal Astrofizika (Armenian: Աստղաֆիզիկա, Russian: Астрофизика), which has been published by the Armenian Academy of Sciences since then. It was originally published in Russian, subsequently articles in English began to appear. He served as its editor-in-chief until 1987. The journal has also been published since the first issue in English by Springer in the US as Astrophysics.

==== Byurakan ====
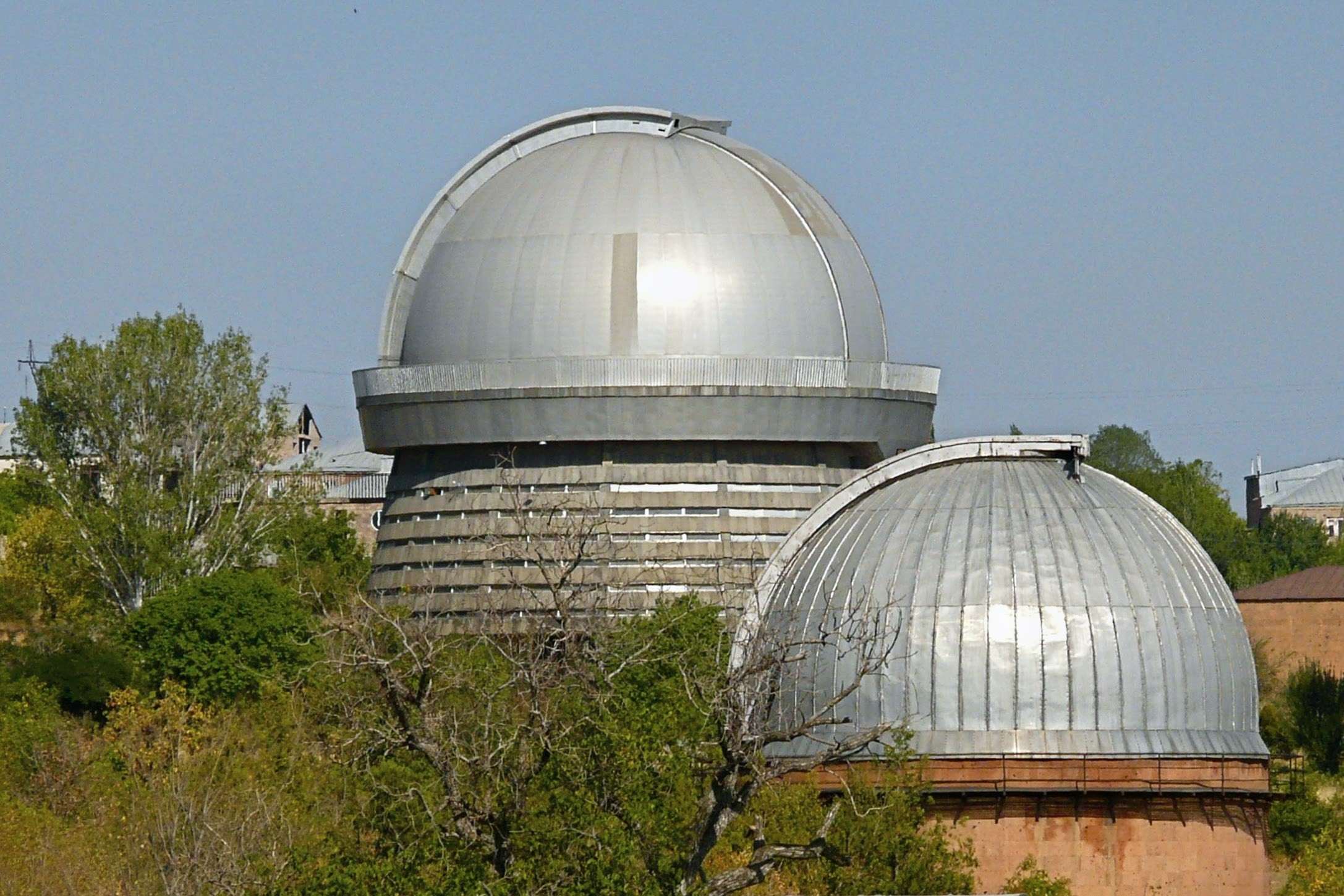
The Byurakan Observatory in 2008

In 1946 Ambartsumian founded the Byurakan Astrophysical Observatory in the village of Byurakan, at an altittude of 1,405 m (4,610 ft), on the slopes of Mount Aragats, some 35 km (22 mi) from Yerevan. The first buildings were completed in 1951, though the official inauguration took place in 1956. Observations began to be carried out simultaneous with the construction of the observatory. "Our instruments stood under the open sky, covered with tarpaulin," said Ambartsumian. Ambartsumian initially lived at a house in the village of Byurakan then build a house within the observatory grounds with the money awarded with the 1950 Stalin Prize. Ambartsumian directed the Byurakan Observatory until 1988 and was named its honorary director that year. From 1946 until his death in 1996, the Byurakan Observatory served as Ambartsumian's "institutional base."

In 1960 Ambartsumian secured a Schmidt telescope with 40І (102 cm) correcting plate and 52І (132 cm) mirror for Byurakan. The telescope was reportedly made by Carl Zeiss AG in Nazi Germany in the 1930s and was transferred to Leningrad as spoils of war. It was completed in Leningrad and sent to Armenia. Beginning with 1965, on Ambartsumian's initiative, Benjamin Markarian started the First Byurakan Survey that resulted in the discovery of the Markarian galaxies. A number of international symposiums and meetings were held at Byurakan under Ambartsumian's supervision. In 1968 the observatory was awarded the Order of Lenin, the Soviet Union's highest civilian order for its great merit to the development of science. In 1961 Ambartsumian supervised the establishment of an astrophysical station of Leningrad State University, his alma mater, within the grounds of the Byurakan Observatory. It is where graduate students of the LSU did their summer internships until the late 1980s. It was shut down in 1993.

Ambartsumian and his disciples at the Byurakan Observatory became known in the scholarly literature as the "Byurakan School." From 1977 to 1996 Ambartsumian headed a specialized council for theses defenses at Byurakan. Over 50 scientists defended their PhD (Candidate) and Doctoral theses on astronomy, astrophysics and theoretical physics in those years under Ambartsumian. Though most of the students were graduates of the astrophysics department of Yerevan State University, many came from Russia, Georgia, Ukraine, Azerbaijan, Hungary, Bulgaria, and elsewhere. Several symposiums of the International Astronomical Union and numerous conferences were held in Byurakan in attendance of Jan Oort, Fritz Zwicky, Subrahmanyan Chandrasekhar, Pyotr Kapitsa, Vitaly Ginzburg, and others. It was also visited by Soviet leaders Nikita Khrushchev and Leonid Brezhnev.

With the Byurakan Observatory, Ambartsumian "put Armenia on the astronomical map" and made Soviet Armenia "one of the world's centers for the study of astrophysics." By the time of his death in 1996, The New York Times described Byurakan as "one of the world's leading astronomical research centers." As of 1960 the Byurakan Observatory maintained regular contact with 350 research institutions and with scientists from 50 countries.

== Research ==
Ambartsumian carried out basic research in astronomy and cosmogony. It covered astrophysics, theoretical physics and mathematical physics, and mostly focused on the physics of nebulae, star systems, and extragalactic astronomy. He is best known for having discovered stellar associations and predicted activity of galactic nuclei. In his later career, Ambartsumian held views in contradiction to the consequences of the general relativity, such as rejecting the existence of black holes.

=== Radiative transfer ===
Ambartsumian discovered basic results in radiative transfer in astronomy. He was the first or one of the first to study stellar radiation transfer in gaseous nebulae. He devised techniques for calculating the rates of star cluster decay and the time needed to reach statistical equilibrium in double star systems.

In this context he introduced in 1943 a new mathematical technique that became later known as invariant imbedding. Lynden-Bell and Gurzadyan describe it as the "law that diffuse reflection by a semi-infinite, plane-parallel atmosphere must be invariant to the addition or subtraction of layers of arbitrary thickness to the atmosphere." It has been applied in other areas, including optics, mathematical physics, radiophysics, geophysics, oceanology, "allowing people to handle easily very complex mathematical problems." It was further developed by Chandrasekhar in his Radiative Transfer (1950). According to Chandrasekhar, the formulation of the principles of invariance in the theory of radiative transfer is a "theoretical innovation that is of the greatest significance." He admitted that Ambartsumian's ideas influenced his own.

=== Stellar associations ===
In 1947 Ambartsumian discovered stellar associations, a new type of stellar system, which led to the conclusion that star formation continues to take place in the Milky Way galaxy. At the time the "idea of star formation as an ongoing process was regarded as very speculative." His discovery was announced in a short publication by the Armenian Academy Sciences. Ambartsumian's discovery was based on his observation of stars of O and B spectral types and T Tauri and flare stars that cluster very loosely. This is significantly different from open clusters, which have a higher density of stars, while stellar associations have lower than average density. Ambartsumian divided stellar associations into OB and T groups and concluded that the "associations have to be dynamically unstable configurations, and must expand subsequently, dissolving to form field stars." He thus argued that star forming is ongoing in the galaxy and that stars are born explosively and in groups.

Ambartsumian's concept was not immediately accepted. Chandrasekhar noted the "early scepticism with which this discovery was received by the astronomers of the 'establishment' when I first gave an account of [Ambartsumian's] paper at the colloquium at the Yerkes Observatory in late 1950." Chandrasekhar noted that Ambartsumian's discovery of stellar associations had "far-reaching implications for subsequent theories relating to star formation." McCutcheon noted that the discovery "opened an entirely new field of astrophysical research."

=== Active galactic nuclei (AGN) ===
Ambartsumian began studying nuclei of galaxies in the mid-1950s. He found that clusters of galaxies are unstable and that galaxy formation is still ongoing. At the 1958 Solvay Conference on Physics in Brussels he gave a famous report in which he emphasized the extraordinary character of the activity of galactic nuclei (AGN). He claimed "enormous explosions take place in galactic nuclei and as a result a huge amount of mass is expelled. In addition, if this is so, these galactic nuclei must contain bodies of huge mass and unknown nature." Lynden-Bell and Gurzadyan note that Ambartsumian was "perhaps the first to emphasize explosive phenomena in galactic nuclei." Evidence for the activity included the Markarian galaxies, discovered at Byurakan. The concept of AGN was widely accepted some years later, especially after quasars were discovered in 1963. Ambartsumian developed and summarized his views on activity of galaxies in the 1960s.

=== Astronomy from space ===
Ambartsumian was a "pioneer of astronomical research from Soviet spacecraft." The program was directed by his disciple Grigor Gurzadyan and was launched in 1961. In April 1971 the Salyut 1 space station carried Orion 1, the "first space telescope with an objective prism, into orbit." In December 1973 the crewed Soyuz 13 mission operated the "Orion-2 ultraviolet Cassegrain telescope with a quartz objective prism built in the Byurakan Observatory. Spectra of thousands of stars to as faint as thirteenth magnitude were obtained, as was the first satellite ultraviolet spectrogram of a planetary nebula, revealing lines of aluminium and titanium-elements not previously observed in planetary nebulae."

These activities, especially the space missions, when for example a special crewed spaceship had to be devoted to an experiment from the smallest Soviet republic, needed powerful backing, both in Kremlin corridors and within the top-secret rocket industry establishment. This was achieved due to Ambartsumian's political skills, with the active support of Mstislav Keldish, the then President of the Academy of Sciences of the USSR.

=== Mathematics ===
Ambartsumian also made contributions to mathematics, most notably with his 1929 paper in Zeitschrift für Physik, where he first introduced the inverse Sturm-Liouville problem. He proved that "among all vibrating strings only the homogeneous vibrating string has eigenvalues that are specific to it—that is, homogeneous vibrating strings have a spectrum of eigenvalues." It was only in the mid-1940s when his paper received attention and became a "significant research topic in the ensuing decades." He commented: "when an astronomer is publishing a mathematical paper in a physical journal, he cannot expect to attract too many readers."

Ambartsumian had made an independent discovery of Radon's problem in 1936. He did so in a three dimensional velocity space rather than ordinary space and gave the solution in two and three dimensions. Allan MacLeod Cormack, the 1979 Nobel Prize Laureate in Physiology or Medicine for his work on X-ray computed tomography, noted that it is the "first numerical inversion of the Radon transform" and suggested that it disproves the "often made statement that computed tomography would be impossible without computers." Ambartsumian's calculations, Cormack argued, "suggest that even in 1936 computed tomography might have been able to make significant contributions to, say, the diagnosis of tumors in the head." Ambartsumian told Cormack that he was informed of Radon's results two years after he published his work.

== Science administration ==
"As well as being one of the giants of astronomical research in the 20th century, Viktor Ambartsumian was also a great leader and organizer of science in Armenia, in Russia, and on the international level."

— Geoffrey Burbidge

=== Soviet Academy of Sciences ===
Ambartsumian was elected corresponding member of the USSR Academy of Sciences in 1939 and full member (academician) in 1953. In 1955 he became a member of the academy's presidium, the governing body. He also chaired the Academy's Joint Coordinating Scientific Council on astronomy, which was responsible for the priorities and all major decisions in all of astronomy. He was also chairman of the academy's commissions on astronomy (1944–46) and cosmogony (1952–64).

In these positions, Ambartsumian was "one of the most powerful scientists of his time." McCutcheon noted that Ambartsumian's "towering authority as an astrophysicist combined with his position in the Soviet establishment made him arguably the most powerful Soviet astronomer of his day." He was often the "official head of Soviet delegations at many conferences, not only on astronomy but also on natural philosophy."

From 1944 to 1979 Ambartsumian was a member of the editorial board of Astronomicheskii zhurnal (also known as Astronomy Reports), the Soviet Union's main astronomy journal. He was also on the editorial board of Doklady Akademii Nauk SSSR (Proceedings of the USSR Academy of Sciences).

=== Armenian Academy of Sciences ===
Although the Armenian branch of the Soviet Academy of Sciences was established in 1935, it was not until 1943 that the National Academy of Sciences of the Armenian SSR was found. Ambartsumian was one of its original co-founders along with other prominent scholars and scientists, including Hovsep Orbeli, who became its first president. Ambartsumian initially served as vice president and in 1947 he became the academy's second president, serving for 46 years until 1993. When he stepped down, Ambartsumian was declared honorary president of the academy.

Rouben Paul Adalian wrote that Ambartsumian "exercised enormous influence in the advancement of science in Soviet Armenia, and was revered as his country's leading scientist." McCutcheon went on to note that "From that point forward, science in Armenia was synonymous with the name Ambartsumian." As president of the principal coordinating body for scientific research in Soviet Armenia, Ambartsumian played a significant role in promoting the sciences in the country. He actively promoted the natural and exact sciences, including physics and mathematics, radioelectronics, chemistry, mechanics and engineering. Artashes Shahinian noted that Ambartsumian played a significant role in the development of the physical and mathematical sciences. He played an instrumental role in the establishment and development of the Yerevan Scientific Research Institute of Mathematical Machines (YerNIIMM) in 1956, popularly known as the "Mergelyan Institute" after its first director, mathematician Sergey Mergelyan. Apoyan rejects that Ambartsumian had a direct involvement in its creation and characterizes his role as "favorable neutrality." Overall, Apoyan criticizes Ambartsumian's role in science administration, arguing that he had a tendency to "fail projects that did not directly serve his fame." He went as far as call Ambartsumian a "tyrant."

Ambartsumian and Mergelyan had a complicated relationship. In 1971 Ambartsumian persuaded him to return to Armenia from Moscow and become vice president of the Armenian Academy of Sciences. However, in 1974 Mergelyan was not reelected to the presidium of the academy and was forced to leave it. Some academicians called for a revote, but Ambartsumian rejected any such attempts. Oganjanyan and Silantiev note that Ambartsumian was rumored to have seen Mergelyan as a rival for the academy's president and decided to "get rid of the competitor forever."

Ambartsumian was the Chairman of the Editorial Board of the Armenian Soviet Encyclopedia, published in 13 volumes in 1974–87.

=== International ===
According to Jean-Claude Pecker Ambartsumian "had a very strong influence on world astropolitics" and is one of the few astronomers who have had such a "deep influence on the life of the international bodies devoted to the promotion and defense of astronomy and science in general."

International Astronomical Union

Ambartsumian was a member of the International Astronomical Union (IAU) since 1946. He served as vice-president of the IAU from 1948 to 1955, then as president from 1961 to 1964. As Vice President Ambartsumian attempted to have the IAU General Assembly be held in Leningrad in 1951, however, the IAU Executive Committee canceled the assembly, increasing tensions within the IAU. An IAU General Assembly eventually took place in Moscow in 1958. Ambartsumian headed the organizing committee. Blaauw noted that "During these years, Ambartsumian, although violently opposing the IAU's policy, remained loyal to the Executive Committee's majority decisions for the sake of safeguarding international collaboration, an attitude that contributed to his election as President of the IAU in 1961." He continued to support it as "the world-wide organization embracing astronomers from all countries. His election as President of the IAU in 1961 reflected both the appreciation for his efforts in this respect and his outstanding scientific achievements."

Ambartsumian was outspoken about the importance of international cooperation. At the 1952 IAU General Assembly in Rome he declared: "We believe that the joint study of such large problems as that of the evolution of celestial bodies will contribute to the cultural rapprochement of different nations, and to a better understanding among them. This is our modest contribution to the noble efforts toward maintaining peace throughout the world." At the 1963 IAU symposium in Sydney he stated that while competition between nations is important, it should be associated with co-operation.

International Council of Scientific Unions

Ambartsumian also served as president of the International Council of Scientific Unions (ICSU) between 1968 and 1972, being elected twice for two-year terms in 1968 and 1970. He was the first individual from the Eastern bloc to be elected to that post.

== Philosophical and cosmological views ==
Ambartsumian made "philosophical excursions", and published several books and articles on philosophy, including Philosophical Questions About the Science of the Universe (1973). In a 1968 paper Ambartsumian wrote that he believes in a close collaboration of philosophy and the natural sciences to solve the main scientific problems about nature. Ambartsumian became a member of the administration of the Philosophical Society of the Soviet Union when it was established in 1971. In 1990 he became honorary president of the Philosophical Society of Armenia, which was created through his efforts.

=== Science and religion ===
Ambartsumian was an atheist and believed that science and religion are irreconcilable. Ambartsumian wrote in 1959 that the "idea of the existence of God, the idea of world-creation has been defeated entirely." In an interview months before his death, Ambartsumian said that "God is an idea [...] the embodiment of morality [...] an idea that gives meaning to life, profound meaning, and thus, it must be acknowledged that it exists."

For over four decades, (Note: The organization effectively ceased to operate during the dissolution of the Soviet Union in 1990, when the last of its publications were made.) he headed Gitelik, the Armenian branch of the all-Soviet organization Znaniye (Knowledge), founded in 1947 to continue the pre-war atheist work of the League of Militant Godless. The organization engaged in what it called "scientific-atheistic propaganda" by publishing atheist novels and journals, producing films and organizing lectures on the supremacy of science over religion. As of 1986, the society had around 20,000 members.

According to one associate, Ambartsumian self-identified as an "Armenian Christian" but was not religious. He felt that Christianity has been important in preserving Armenian identity. Ambartsumian had friendly relations with Vazgen I, the long-time head (Catholicos) of the Armenian Apostolic Church, especially since at least the late 1980s. (Note: In 1988 Vazgen I publicly congratulated Ambartsumian's 80th anniversary in 1988. Ambartsumian and the four other prominent Armenians hunger striking in Moscow sent a letter to Vazgen I on his birthday on 20 September 1990 expressing their admiration for him. "Your holy faith and your sublime example of selflessly serving the nation give us strength and endurance," read the statement. Vazgen I was made honorary member of the Ambartsumian-led Armenian Academy of Sciences in 1991.) In 1969 Ambartsumian visited San Lazzaro degli Armeni in Venice, home of the Armenian Catholic congregation of the Mekhitarists and was declared an honorary member of its academy.

=== Marxism–Leninism and dialectical materialism ===
Ambartsumian accepted and followed Marxist-Leninist philosophy and staunchly promoted dialectical materialism and projected it on his astrophysical interpretations. Helge Kragh described Ambartsumian as a "convinced Marxist." He wrote on Marxism–Leninism and dialectical materialism in 1959: (Note: Also cited in)

The history of the development of human knowledge, each step forward in science and technology, each new scientific discovery, irrefutably attests to the truth and fruitfulness of dialectical materialism, affirms the correctness of the Marxist-Leninist teaching concerning the knowability of the world, the magnitude and transforming power of the human mind, which is penetrating ever deeper into the secrets of nature. At the same time the achievements of science convincingly demonstrate the complete unsoundness of idealism and agnosticism, and the reactionariness of the religious world view.

Dialectical materialism influenced Ambartsumian's cosmological views and ideas. According to Loren Graham, "perhaps no great Soviet scientist has made more outspoken statements in favor of dialectical materialism" than Ambartsumian. Mark H. Teeter wrote in a 1981 report that Ambartsumian is "one of a rather limited group of Soviet scholars of international stature who claim that dialectical materialism has assisted them in their work." Kragh noted that Ambartsumian was not a cosmologist, but an astrophysicist, and that "his ideas of the universe were influenced both by his background in astrophysics and his adherence to Marxist–Leninist philosophy." Graham notes that his "praise of dialectical materialism has been voiced again and again over the years; these affirmations have come when political controls were rather lax as well as when they were tight. We have every reason to believe that they reflect, at root, his own approach to nature."

== Political career and views ==
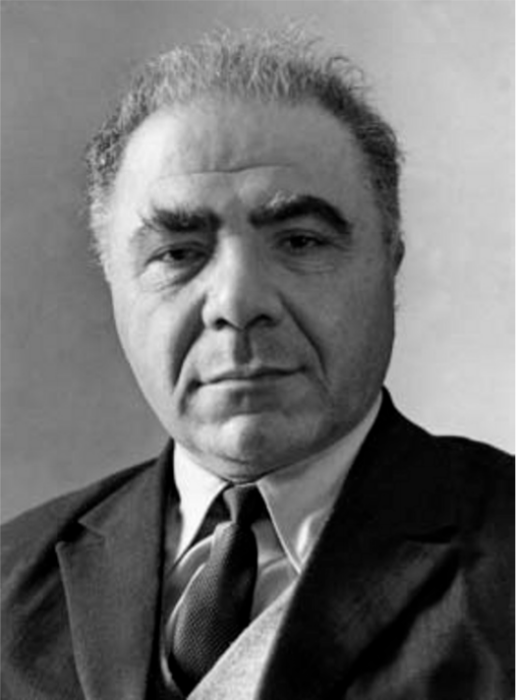
Ambartsumian

Ambartsumian is often referred to as a politician; Donald Lynden-Bell called him a skillful one. In a 1977 interview Subrahmanyan Chandrasekhar went as far as to opine that Ambartsumian has been "much more of a politician than an astronomer" since the mid-1940s.

Ludvig Mirzoyan, a colleague and friend, wrote that "Ambartsumian was a true patriot of his native land, Soviet Armenia and all the Soviet Union, and simultaneously, he was a convinced internationalist." He was described by a Soviet-run magazine as an "ardent advocate of the widest possible international scientific exchange."

=== Soviet politics ===
McCutcheon noted that Ambartsumian's life was "shaped and directed by the Soviet system" and he was politically loyal to the Soviet regime. Adriaan Blaauw wrote that "his political views harmonized to a considerable degree with those of Soviet rulers." Loren Graham argued that, simultaneously, he was "not afraid to reprimand the Communist Party ideologues when they obstructed his research." In favor with the Communist Party, he enjoyed the freedom to regularly travel to the West. McCutcheon noted that Ambartsumian's "scientific genius combined with his political loyalty took him to the heights of the Soviet scientific establishment."

Ambartsumian jointed the Communist Party of the Soviet Union (CPSU) in 1940. In 1948 he became a member of the Central Committee (the executive branch) of the Communist Party of the Armenian SSR. Ambartsumian was also a member of the Supreme Soviet from 1950 to 1989 (3rd to 11th convocation sessions). In 1989 he was elected as a representative from Armenia to the Congress of People's Deputies of the Soviet Union in the first relatively free elections.

Ambartsumian was a delegate to the 19th (1952), 20th (1956), 22nd (1961), 23rd (1966), 24th (1971), 25th (1976) and 26th (1981) congresses of the CPSU.

=== Cold War politics ===
Ambartsumian often signed open letters in support of the official line of the Soviet authorities. In 1971 he was among leading 14 Soviet scientists who signed a letter to U.S. President Richard Nixon in support of Angela Davis and appealed him to "give her an opportunity of continuing her scientific work." In 1983 Ambartsumian was among 244 Soviet scientists who signed a statement attacking U.S. President Ronald Reagan's Strategic Defense Initiative ("Star Wars"), namely Reagan's plan for an effective defense against nuclear attack. The scientists stated that Reagan is "creating a most dangerous illusion that may turn into an even more threatening spiral of the arms race."

Ambartsumian's relationship with dissidents was complicated. In 1973 he refused to meet Yuri Orlov, nuclear physicist and a prominent dissident, after having offered him a job in Yerevan. Ambartsumian told him through subordinate that "there are situations when even an Academy member is helpless." In 1975 he was among 72 Soviet scientists who denounced the award of the Nobel Peace Prize to Soviet physicist and dissident Andrei Sakharov.

=== Armenian causes ===
Ambartsumian revered the Armenian language and supported its usage. He insisted all internal communication of the Armenian Academy of Sciences be done in Armenian when he became president in 1947. As president of the Armenian Academy of Sciences, Ambartsumian often gave speeches at major events, such as during the commemorations of the 1600th anniversary of Mesrop Mashtots, the inventor of the Armenian alphabet, in 1962 and the 100th anniversary of Hovhannes Tumanyan, Armenia's national poet, in 1969. Ambartsumian stated: "The history of our culture has given many outstanding figures, but of all these figures, the Armenian people owe the most to Mashtots."

==== Armenian genocide ====
Ambartsumian delivered a speech on 24 April 1965, on the 50th anniversary of the Armenian genocide, describing it as "extermination of the Armenian population of Western Armenia." He linked it to the 45th anniversary of Soviet Armenia and the revival of the Armenian people as a result of the October Revolution. In an article published in Pravda on 24 April 1975 Ambartsumian linked the Armenian genocide to the Holocaust and blamed German imperialism during World War I for inspiring the Young Turks and the capitalist states for failing to defend the innocent Armenian population and praised the October Revolution for saving the Armenian nation.

==== Nagorno-Karabakh ====
Ambartsumian played a role in the Karabakh movement and was vocal in the initial phase of the Nagorno-Karabakh conflict. In November 1989, the Ambartsumian-led Armenian Academy of Sciences issued a statement protesting the decision of the Supreme Soviet of the Soviet Union to return Nagorno-Karabakh under the direct control of Soviet Azerbaijan.

In September 1990 Ambartsumian and four other Armenians, including writer Zori Balayan and actor Sos Sargsyan, went on a hunger strike at the Hotel Moskva in Moscow to protest the military rule over Nagorno-Karabakh declared by Mikhail Gorbachev. Ambartsumian celebrated his 82nd birthday hunger striking. He insisted that Gorbachev had violated the Soviet constitution by keeping Nagorno-Karabakh under direct rule from Moscow. "This is a bad thing when a government does not abide by its own laws," he argued. He also stated: "My desire is that Karabakh be part of Armenia. This is a problem that has to be solved with a long process and with concessions." Ambartsumian stated that his only demand is that the "elected leaders of Nagorno-Karabakh regain control." Ambartsumian called the hunger strike a "modest step" aimed at making a "huge resonance in the world—to let the world know." The Soviet authorities "totally ignored" the strike. He ended it after 9 days only when Catholicos Vazgen I persuaded him to do so.

On 11 May 1991 Ambartsumian and a number of members of the Armenian Academy of Sciences wrote a letter to Soviet President Mikhail Gorbachev expressing their concern with the forced expulsion of ethnic Armenians from parts of NKAO and Shahumian rayon as part of Operation Ring.

=== Soviet collapse and independence of Armenia ===
In June 1991 the session of the Armenian Academy of Sciences issued a statement on its views on Armenian independence and the future of the Soviet Union. The Academy stated its unconditional support for the independence of Armenia, pushed at the time by the Pan-Armenian National Movement (HHSh). However, it argued that because Armenia is economically interconnected with and dependent on other Soviet republics, an abrupt disruption in the existing relations would result in "unimaginable levels of economic collapse, unemployment and emigration." Thus, they called for Armenia to join the New Union Treaty proposed by Gorbachev. The session also argued that leaving the Soviet Union would mean to abandon Nagorno-Karabakh.

As a communist, Ambartsumian reportedly regretted the collapse of the Soviet Union, but voted for Armenia's independence in the 1991 referendum. He appreciated independent Armenia, but reminded Armenians that they will be paying a high price for it. In 1995 he congratulated Armenians worldwide with Armenia's independence and stated that the newly independent republic is "moving forward." According to Yuri Shahbazyan, a friend and biographer of Ambartsumian, he remained sympathetic towards the Communist Party of Russia and was critical of Western-sponsored economic liberalization in Russia and other post-Soviet countries.

== Personal life ==
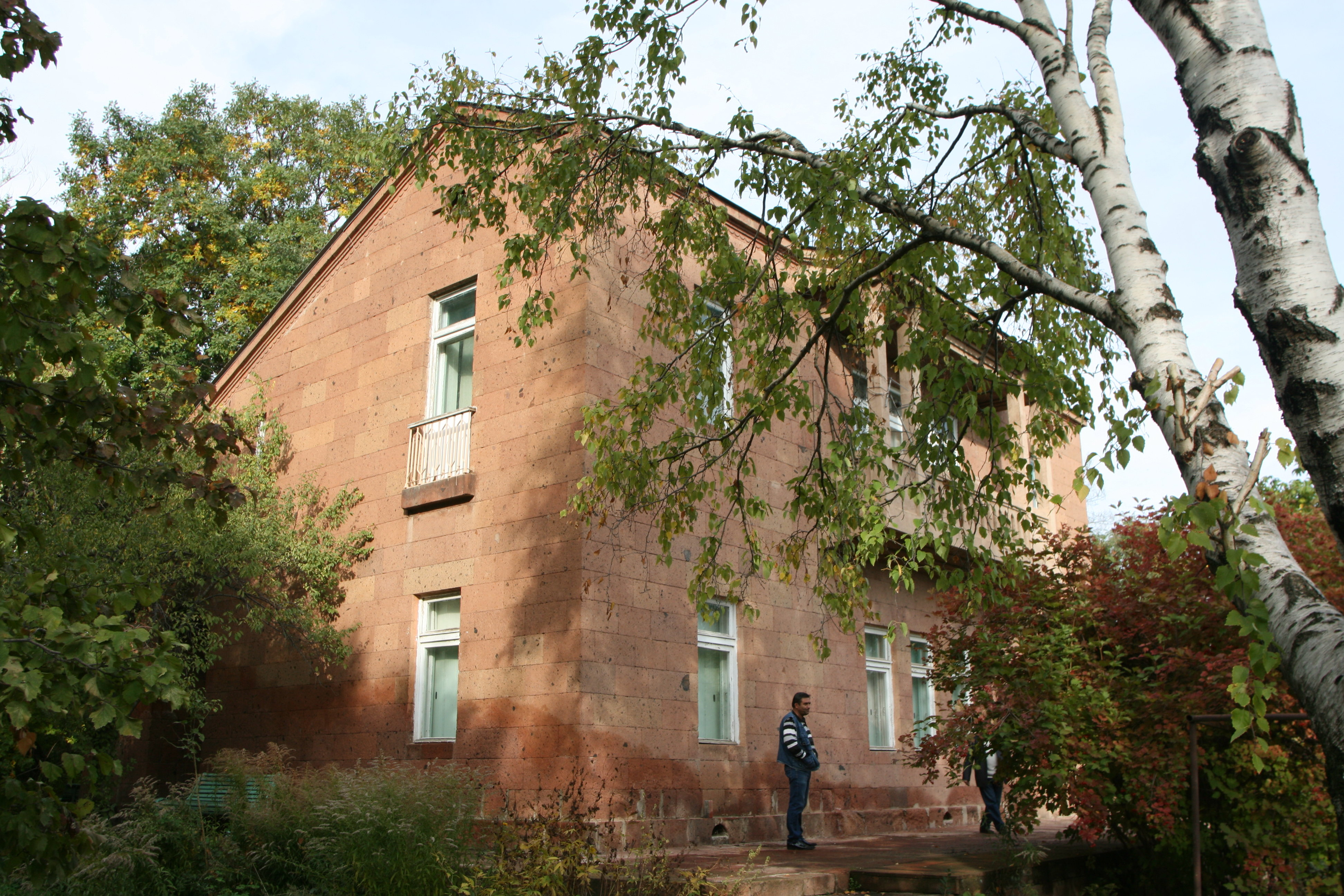
Ambartsumian's house-museum in Byurakan, where he lived since around 1950 and died in 1996.

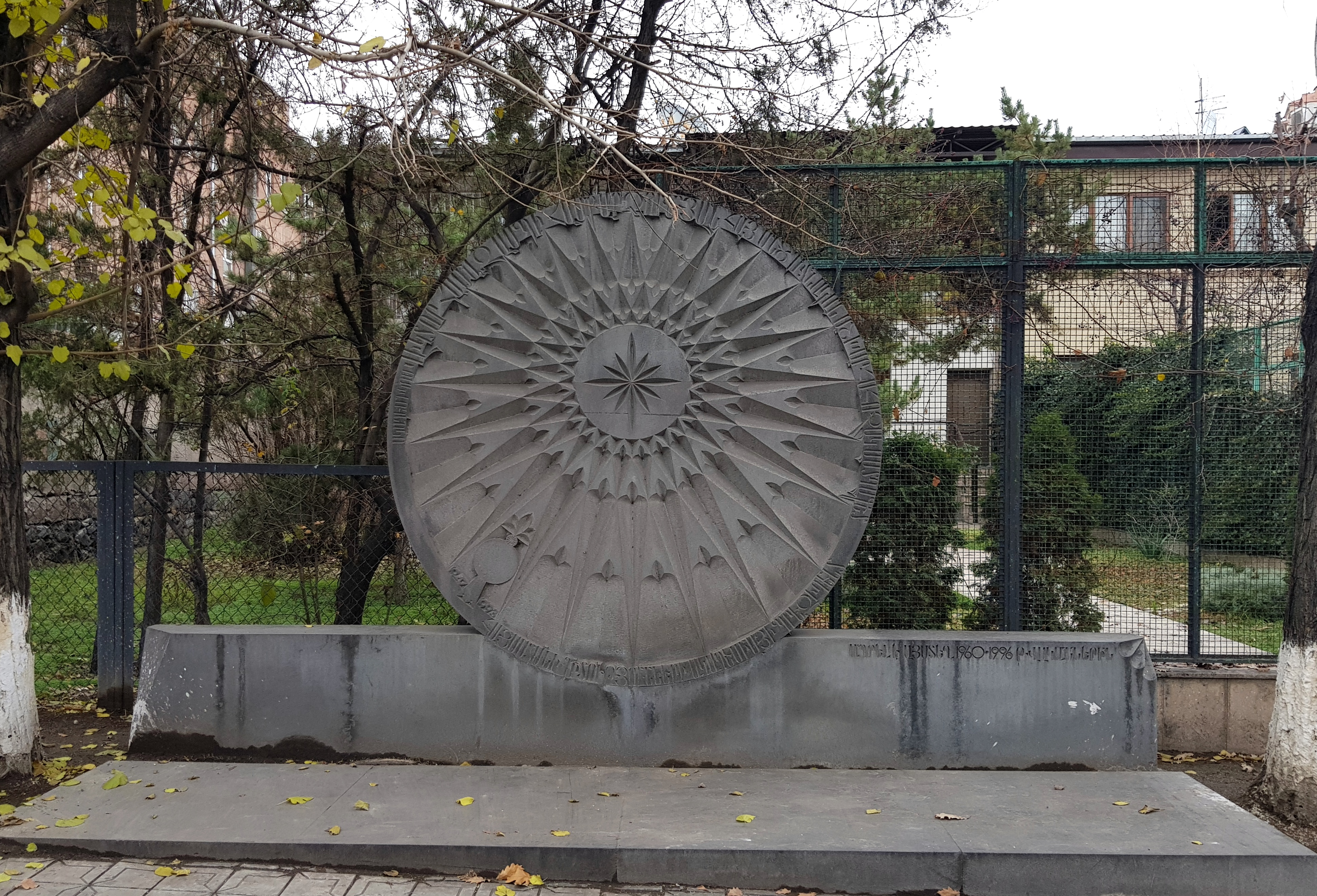
A memorial in front of Ambartsumian's house in Yerevan's Baghramyan Avenue

When Ambartsumian was referred to by foreigners as a Russian scientist, he corrected them by saying he was Armenian. He spoke perfect Armenian, albeit with an accent.

Between 1946 and 1996 Ambartsumian mostly divided his time between Yerevan and Byurakan. He built himself a house within the Byurakan Observatory with the award money that came with his second Stalin Prize in 1950. Since 1960 he also maintained a house next to the building of the Academy of Sciences in Yerevan, on Baghramyan Avenue.

=== Personality ===
Donald Lynden-Bell characterized Ambartsumian as a "broad-shouldered thickset man of medium height, quick intellect and strong character." Lynden-Bell and Vahe Gurzadyan wrote that Ambartsumian was modest in private life and behaved simply in public. Fadey Sargsyan described Ambartsumian as an "extremely modest" man. Anthony Astrachan wrote in The New Yorker that Ambartsumian is "by all reports an engaging human being." Ambartsumian admitted to not having any hobbies: "My only passion is science, astronomy. Like a jealous wife, it expects a man to give all of himself." However, he loved poetry and music, and "could enliven even the most abstract mathematical lectures with quotations from classical and contemporary poets."

=== Family ===
In 1930 or 1931 Ambartsumian married Vera Fyodorovna (née Klochikhina), an ethnic Russian, who was the niece and the adopted daughter of Pelageya Shajn, the wife of Grigory Shajn, both Russian astronomers. She was an English teacher who taught him to read his papers in English when he visited the U.S. and Britain. However, she could not reconcile with his "barbarous pronunciation," as she described it. He was deeply depressed by her death in 1995. They had four children: daughters Karine (b. 1933) and Yelena (b. 1936) and sons Rafayel (b. 1940) and Rouben (b. 1941). All four became either mathematicians or physicists. As of 1987 he had eight grandchildren.

=== Retirement and death ===
Ambartsumian began retiring from the various positions he held in 1988, at 80. He left the position of the director of the Byurakan Observatory that year. In 1993 he stepped down as president of the Armenian Academy of Sciences and in 1994 as chair of astrophysics at Yerevan State University.

Ambartsumian died at his Byurakan house on August 12, 1996, a month short of his 88th birthday. He was buried at the observatory grounds, next to his wife and parents. His funeral was attended by thousands of people, including Armenia's president Levon Ter-Petrosyan.

His house was inaugurated as a museum in August 1998.

== Recognition ==
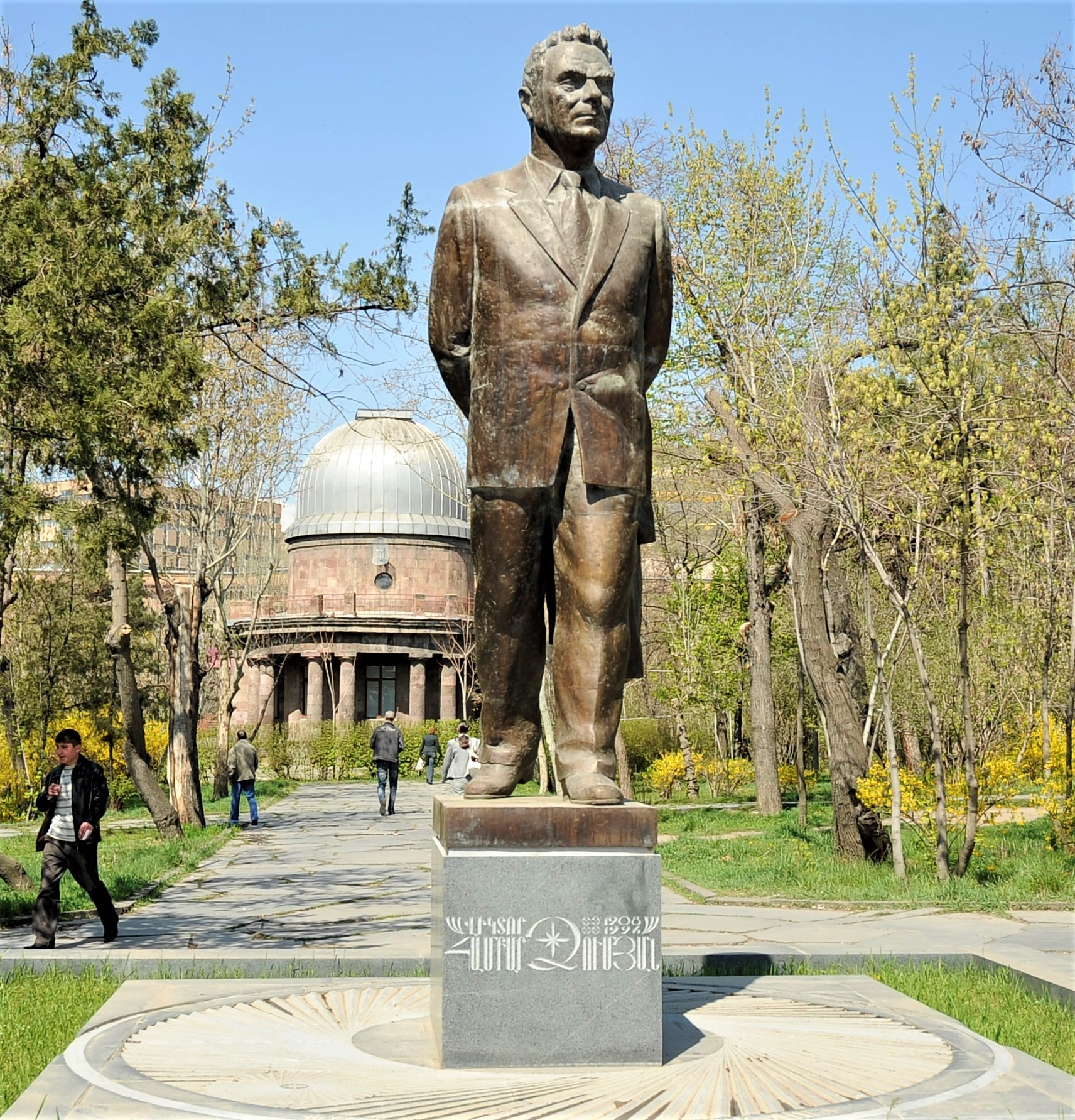
Ambartsumian's statue in Yerevan

Ambartsumian was one of the 20th century's leading astrophysicists (Note: "...recognized as one of the giants of twentieth-century astrophysics..." "Victor Ambartsumian, a giant of world astrophysics, alive...") and astronomers. (Note: Geoffrey Burbidge: "...one of the giants of astronomical research in the 20th century...") He was the leading astronomer of the Soviet Union (Note: Leonard Searle, 1958: "The authors are prominent Soviet astrophysicists and the complete volume is edited by the most eminent of them, V. A. Ambartsumyan.": Walter Sullivan, 1964: "The observatory is the headquarters of Viktor A. Ambartsumian, Russia's foremost astronomer..."; Jaan Einasto, 2013: "I visited in autumn 1977 Byurakan Observatory and discussed the idea with Viktor Ambartsumian, the most influential astronomer of the USSR.") and is universally recognized as the founder of the Soviet school of theoretical astrophysics. (Note: Russian Academy of Sciences: "основоположник советской школы теоретической астрофизики" Andrei Severny and Viktor Sobolev: "V. A. Ambartsumyan is considered to be, by right, the founder of Soviet theoretical astrophysics." Garik Israelian: "It is commonly accepted that V.A. Ambartsumian was a father of the Soviet school of Theoretical Astrophysics." A. David Andrews: "This eminent founder of astrophysics in the former Soviet Union...") Ambartsumian was also well-regarded internationally. (Note: The authors of a 1981 US government report described him as "among the Soviet Union's best-known and most respected scientists abroad.") Loren Graham called him "one of the best-known abroad of all Soviet scientists." He was an honorary or foreign member of academies of sciences of over 25 countries.

Despite being a Soviet scientist, he was well-regarded in the United States. During the Cold War, Ambartsumian was the first Soviet scientist to become foreign honorary member of the American Academy of Arts and Sciences and foreign associate of the National Academy of Sciences in 1958 and 1959, respectively. (Note: "the first Soviet Scientist since World War II to become a foreign honorary member of the American Academy of Arts and Sciences." "The National Academy of Sciences announced today that Viktor A. Ambartsumyan, a Soviet astronomer, had been made a foreign associate of the academy -- the first Soviet scientist to be so honored in over a decade.") In January 1971 Ambartsumian was invited to the U.S. House Committee on Science and Astronautics, where he was introduced by Fred Lawrence Whipple as a "man who is rated the world's greatest astronomer or at least among the very greatest."

In 1977 Subrahmanyan Chandrasekhar stated: "My own impression has always been that he was, when he was in his prime, one of the most perceptive and elegant of astronomers." Chandrasekhar opined in 1988:

Academician Ambartsumian’s realm does not divide astronomy and astrophysics into its conventional parts: theoretical and observational. He is an astronomer par excellence. [...] There can be no more than two or three astronomers in this century who can look back on a life so worthily devoted to the progress of astronomy.

=== In Armenia ===
After his visit to Armenia in 1971, William H. McNeill wrote that Ambartsumian enjoys "enormous local prestige." One of the "modern icons of Armenian pride," Ambartsumian is recognized as the most prominent scientist in 20th century Armenia, and the most important since the seventh century polymath Anania Shirakatsi. Fadey Sargsyan, Ambartsumian's successor as President of the Armenian Academy of Sciences, stated in 1998 that he went "beyond the limits of his scientific fields and in his own lifetime [became] a great national figure."

On 11 October 1994 Armenia's President Levon Ter-Petrosyan awarded Ambartsumian the title of a National Hero of Armenia for his scientific work of international significance, science administration and patriotic activism. His official obituary was signed by Armenia's president, government and parliament.

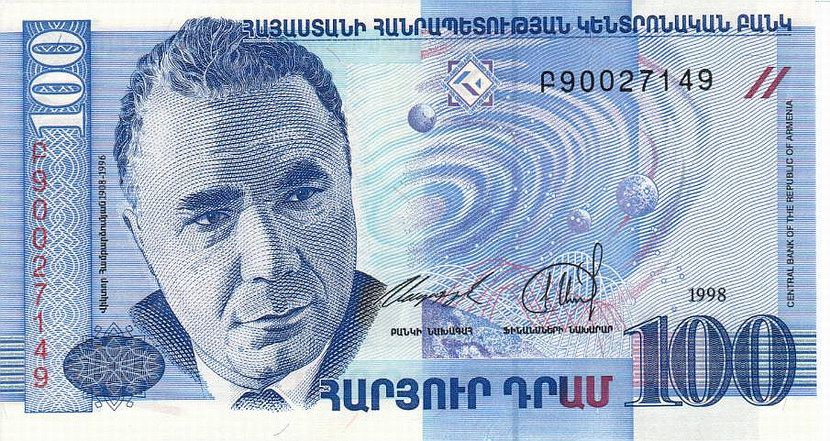
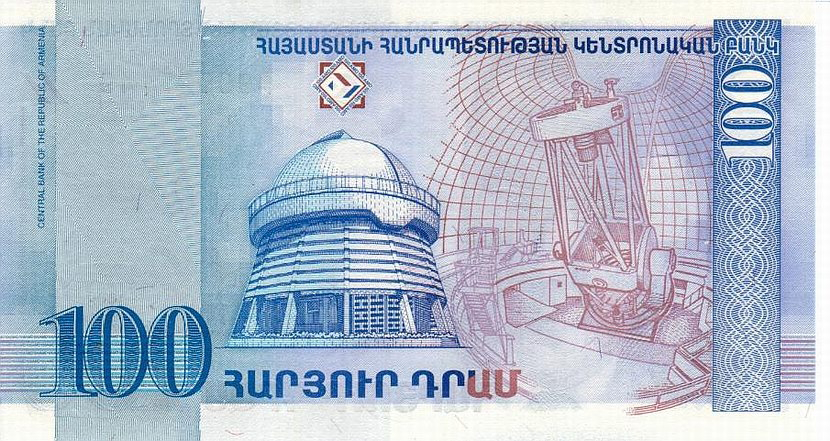
Ambartsumian appeared on the 100-dram banknote (1998–2004)

=== Tribute ===
An asteroid discovered at the Crimean Astrophysical Observatory in 1972 by Tamara Smirnova is named 1905 Ambartsumian. Ambartsumian's Knot is a small tidal dwarf galaxy located in NGC 3561 in the constellation Ursa Major.

In 1998 Ambartsumian's 90th anniversary was celebrated in Armenia; the International Astronomical Union held a symposium at the Byurakan Observatory and the Central Bank of Armenia issued a 100 dram banknote depicting Ambartsumian and the Byurakan Observatory. The Byurakan Observatory was officially named after him that year. Other things named after Ambartsumian include Chair of General Physics and Astrophysics at Yerevan State University, a street, park, and public school in Yerevan, and the Pedagogical Institute of Vardenis.

In 2009 a 3.2-metre (10 ft) bronze statue of Ambartsumian was unveiled in Yerevan at the park around the Yerevan Observatory in attendance of President Serzh Sargsyan and other officials. Busts of Ambartsumian stand at the Byurakan Observatory, the city of Vardenis (1978), and at the central campus of Yerevan State University.

In 2009 Armenian President Serzh Sargsyan established an international prize in Ambartsumian's memory. It was first awarded in 2010 and is awarded every two years. The prize was initially $500,000, but was reduced to $300,000 in 2018. It is considered one of the prestigious awards in astronomy and related fields.

== Awards and honors ==
=== State awards ===
Soviet Union

- Hero of Socialist Labour (1968, 1978)
- Honored Scientist of the Armenian SSR (1940) and the Georgian SSR (1968)
- Order of Lenin (1945, 1958, 1968, 1974, 1978)
- Order of the Red Banner of Labour (1944, 1953)
- Order of the Badge of Honour (1988)
- Order of the October Revolution (1983)
- Medal "For Labour Valour" (1960)
- USSR State Prize (1946, 1950)

Armenia

- National Hero of Armenia (1994)

Foreign countries

- Order of Cyril and Methodius, People's Republic of Bulgaria (1969)
- Order of Merit of the Republic of Poland 3rd class, Polish People's Republic (1973)
- Order of the Flag, Hungarian People's Republic (1975)
- State Prize of the Russian Federation (1995)

=== Professional awards ===
- Prix Jules Janssen of the Société astronomique de France (1956)
- Gold Medal of the Royal Astronomical Society (1960) "for outstanding contributions to astrophysics"
- Bruce Medal of the Astronomical Society of the Pacific (1960)
- Lomonosov Gold Medal of the Soviet Academy of Sciences, "for outstanding achievements in the field of astronomy and astrophysics" (1971)
- Helmholtz Medal (Helmholtz-Medaille) of the Academy of Sciences of the German Democratic Republic (1971)
- Cothenius Medal of the Academy of Sciences Leopoldina (1974)

=== Membership ===
Soviet Union

- Corresponding Member of the USSR Academy of Sciences (1939)
- Full member (Academician) of the Armenian SSR Academy of Sciences (1943)
- Full member (Academician) of the USSR Academy of Sciences (1953)
- Honorary member of the Academies of Sciences of the Georgian SSR and Azerbaijan SSR

Abroad

Ambartsumian was elected honorary and foreign member of 28 Academies of Sciences, including:

- Honorary Member of the American Astronomical Society (1947)
- Associate of the Royal Astronomical Society (1953)
- Corresponding member (1958) and foreign associate (1978) of the French Academy of Sciences
- Foreign Honorary Member of the American Academy of Arts and Sciences (1958)
- Foreign Associate of the U.S. National Academy of Sciences (1959)
- Honorary Member of the Royal Astronomical Society of Canada (1959)
- Foreign Member of the Royal Society (1969)

=== Honorary degrees ===
Ambartsumian received honorary doctorates from several universities: Australian National University (1963), University of Paris (1967), University of Liège (1967), Charles University in Prague (1967), Nicolaus Copernicus University in Toruń (1973), National University of La Plata (1974).

== Publications ==
Throughout his career, Ambartsumian authored some 20 books and booklets and over 200 academic papers.

=== Theoretical Astrophysics (1952) ===
Ambartsumian served as editor and senior author of the 1952 book Teoreticheskaia Astrofizika (Теоретическая астрофизика). It is an extended version of his 1939 book on theoretical astrophysics—the first systematic textbook on the subject in Russian—based on his lectures at Leningrad State University. It was translated into a number of languages, including English, German, and Chinese. The English translation appeared in 1958 as Theoretical Astrophysics. It became a bible for a generation of astronomers and astrophysicists and was well received by reviewers. Roderick Oliver Redman called it "a welcome addition to the comparatively few general texts of solid worth which are now available" and noted that in a short time it had found "many appreciative readers in both German and English speaking countries." Cecilia Payne-Gaposchkin wrote that it is the "only advanced book of this scope in English, it will be of the greatest value." George B. Field described the book as "comprehensively and competently constructed." A. David Andrews described it as a "valuable textbook", which "contains examples of [Ambartsumian's] unique and fruitful approaches to stubborn astronomical problems." Leonard Searle lauded the sections on stellar atmospheres, but criticized the section on interstellar material, especially the constitution of stars as outdated for ignoring fundamental post-war western contributions.

== See also ==
- Armenians in Tbilisi

== Bibliography ==
Books on Ambartsumian

- Shakhbazyan, Yuri (2011). Амбарцумян: Этапы жизни и научные концепции [Ambartsumian: Stages of Life and Scientific Concepts] (PDF) (in Russian). Moscow: Molodaya Gvardiya. ISBN 978-978-5-03437-0. Archived from the original (PDF) on 2 December 2019.

Journal articles

- Lynden-Bell, D.; Gurzadyan, V. (1998). "Victor Amazaspovich Ambartsumian. 18 September 1908 – 12 August 1996". Biographical Memoirs of Fellows of the Royal Society. 44. Royal Society: 22–34. doi:10.1098/rsbm.1998.0002. JSTOR 770228.
- Brutian, Grigor [in Armenian] (2008). "Վիկտոր Համբարձումեան [Viktor Hambardzumyan]". Etchmiadzin (in Armenian). 64 (10). Mother See of Holy Etchmiadzin: 99–105.
- Parsamian, Elma S., ed. (2008). Victor Amabartsumian (PDF). Yerevan: Gitutyun Press. Armenian Academy of Sciences. ISBN 978-5-8080-0742-0. Archived from the original (PDF) on 20 January 2025.
- McCutcheon, Robert A. (1991). "The 1936-1937 Purge of Soviet Astronomers". Slavic Review. 50 (1): 100–117. doi:10.2307/2500602. JSTOR 2500602. S2CID 159916900.
- Editorial Board (2008). "В. А. Амбарцумян - жизнь в науке". Astrofizika (in Russian). 51 (3): 343–362.; translated in Editorial Board of Journal Astrofizika (2008). "V. A. Ambartsumian—A Life in Science". Astrophysics. 51 (3): 280–293. Bibcode:2008Ap.....51..280E. doi:10.1007/s10511-008-9016-6. S2CID 189843048.

General books

- Graham, Loren (1987) [1972]. Science and Philosophy in the Soviet Union. New York: Columbia University Press.
- Vucinich, Alexander (2001). Einstein and Soviet Ideology. Stanford University Press. pp. 173-176. ISBN 9780804742092.
