= Marat Arakelian =

Armenian astronomer

Dr. Marat Arsen Arakelian
- Մարատ Արսենի Առաքելյան
- Born: January 15, 1929; Goris, Armenian SSR, USSR
- Died: January 20, 1983 (aged 54); Moscow, USSR
- Resting place: Byurakan, Armenia
- Education: Yerevan State University; Leningrad State University; Moscow State University
- Known for: Arakelian catalog of high-surface-brightness galaxies
- Scientific career
- Fields: Astrophysics
- Workplaces: Byurakan Astrophysical Observatory; Yerevan State University; Armenian State Pedagogical University
- Theses: Spectrophotometric investigation of Algol (1956); Spectral observations and statistics of galaxies with active nuclei (1977)
- Doctoral advisor: Dr. Oleg Aleksandrovich Melnikov

Marat Arsen Arakelian (Armenian: Մարատ Արսենի Առաքելյան) (Russian: Марат Арсенович Аракелян) (15 January 1929 – 20 January 1983) was an Armenian astronomer. Arakelian was a specialist in theoretical astrophysics and extragalactic astronomy. He is most noted for his catalog of “Galaxies of high surface brightness” (named Arakelian galaxies, Akn), a list of 621 objects with surface brightness at least 22.0 magnitude from an area of 1 sq. arc second. The Arakelian catalog has become a source in the study of active galactic nuclei.

== Early life and education ==
Arakelian was born in Goris, Syunik Province in the Armenian Soviet Socialist Republic, a Soviet republic (now the Republic of Armenia). He attended the Yerevan State University (YSU) in the Physical-Mathematical Department and graduated in 1951. He was among the first YSU students specialized in astrophysics. Arakelian was assigned to the Byurakan Astrophysical Observatory (BAO), where he worked first as assistant astronomer, and later as junior research associate. His postgraduate study at Leningrad State University (now Saint Petersburg State University, St. Petersburg) was completed in 1955, and in 1956 he successfully defended his Ph.D. thesis “Spectrophotometric investigation of Algol” under the supervision of Prof. Oleg Aleksandrovich Melnikov at LSU.

== Career ==
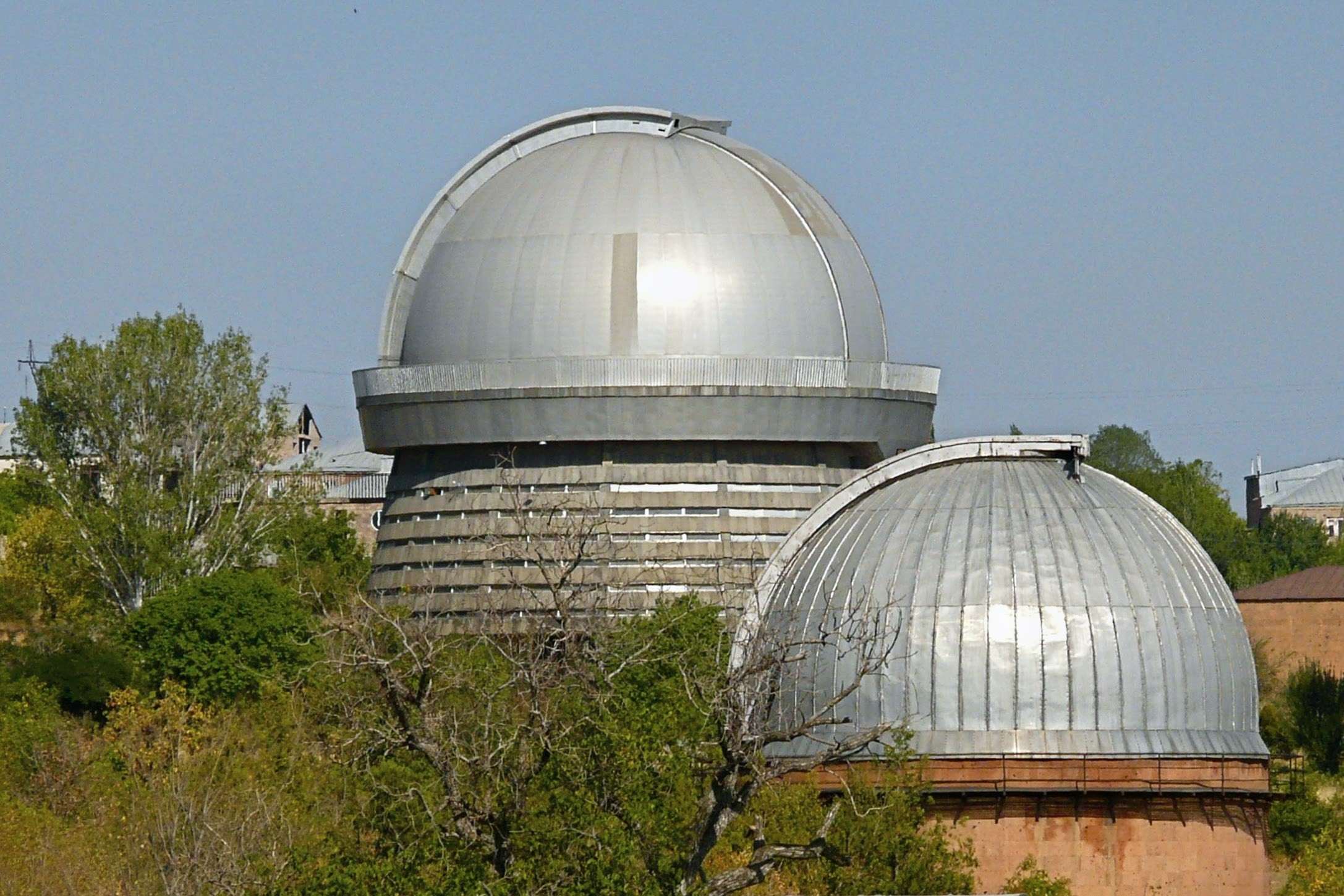
The Byurakan Observatory in 2008

From 1957 to 1959, Arakelian combined his work with a senior teacher position at the Department of Astrophysics at Yerevan State University. Aralekian was a junior researcher and lectured at the Leningrad State University from 1960 to 1966. After being awarded the title of Associate Professor in 1966, Arakelian again joined the staff at Byurakan Astrophysical Observatory, combining his research with a position as lecturer at Yerevan. Together with L.V. Mirzoyan, A.T. Kalloghlian, and H.M. Tovmassian, he was the co-author of the textbook Astronomy for secondary schools (three editions in 1970, 1971, and 1973). In 1967, he became a senior researcher at the Byurakan Astrophysical Observatory. In 1977, Arakelian defended his second doctoral thesis "Spectral observations and statistics of galaxies with active nuclei" at Moscow State University (MSU) and became a Doctor of Sciences. In 1982, he was elected the Chair of the Department of Astrophysics and Theoretical Physics of the Armenian State Pedagogical University named after Khachatur Abovian. Arakelian wrote an extended review on “Clusters of galaxies” in the book Problems of Extragalactic Astronomy (1981).

Prior to his death at the age of 54 on 20 January 1983 in Moscow, Arakelian devoted himself to research, publishing over 80 articles.

== Bibliography ==
- Arakelian, M. A. (1968) “Study of the luminosity function and the stellar space density in the solar neighbourhood”. Astrophysics (Russian: Астрофизика).
- Arakelian, M. A. (1969-1970) “Study of the luminosity evolution of quasars based on the evolutionary effects associated with them”. Astrophysics and Soviet Astronomical Circular (Russian: Астрономический циркуляр). (A summary of these works was published in the journal Nature in 1970 vol. 225, p. 358-359.)
- Arakelian, M. A. (1969) “Statistical study of flare stars in the solar vicinity”. Communications of the Konkoly Observatory, Communications of BAO and reported at the conference “Non-periodic phenomena in variable stars” in 1969.
- Arakelian, M. A.; Kalloghlian, A.T. (1970) “Derivation of the luminosity function of field galaxies” Soviet Astronomy (Russian: Астрономический журнал).
- Arakelian, M. A. (1971) “The proof of the extragalactic origin of quasars.” Astrophysics and Bulletin of the USSR Acad. Sci. (Russian: Вестник АН СССР)
- Arakelian, M. A.; Dibai, E.A.; Esipov, V.F. (1973) “Spectroscopic observations and studies of a few hundred Markarian galaxies and discovery of more than 40 new Seyferts among them” Astrophysics and Soviet Astronomical Circular
- Arakelian, M. A. (1974) “Analysis of the surface brightness of emission-line galaxies (including Seyfert and Markarian ones) and development of a method for revealing galaxies with high surface brightness” Astrophysics
- Arakelian, M. A. (1973) “Suggestion of a new method for definition of space density of extragalactic objects and estimation of the mean density of matter in the Metagalaxy” Astrophysics
- Arakelian, M. A. (1975) “Galaxies of high surface brightness” Communications of BAO Bibcode:1975SoByu..47....3A
- Arakelian, M. A. (1975) “Derivations of the luminosity function and space density of galaxies with UV continuum (Markarian galaxies)”, Soviet Astronomy
- Arakelian, M. A.; Dibai, E.A.; Esipov, V.F. (1975) “Spectroscopic observations and studies of Arakelian galaxies (galaxies with high surface brightness) and discovery of new Seyferts among them” Astrophysics and Soviet Astronomical Circular and reported in the meeting “Stars and galaxies from observational points of view” in 1975.
- Arakelian, M. A. (1976) “Study of the dependence of the emission-line intensities of Markarian and Seyfert galaxies on their color index” Astrophysics
- Arakelian, M. A. (1978) “Study of the distribution of the mean surface brightness of galaxies in the Coma cluster” Astrophysics
- Arakelian, M. A.; Kandalyan, R.A. (1980) “Study of the relation between the mean surface brightness and radio emission of galaxies, including Seyfert galaxies” Astrophysics
- Arakelian, M. A.; Kritsuk, A.G. (1981) “Study of the estimations of the kinetic energies of clusters of galaxies; the extent to which a kinetic energy estimate would be affected by a possible mass dependence of the velocity dispersion of galaxies in clusters was considered. It was concluded that in some cases the kinetic energy might be underestimated” Astrophysics
- Arakelian, M. A.; Kojoian, G.; Dickinson, D.F.; Elliott, R.; Bicay, M.D. (1981) “Radio (6cm) observations of Arakelian galaxies and publication of their accurate positions” Astronomical Journal
- Arakelian, M. A.; Mahtessian, A.P. (1982) “Comparative study and statistics of the surface brightness and morphological types of isolated and double galaxies” Astrophysics
- Arakelian, M. A.; Terebizh, V.Yu. (1982) “Study of Seyfert galaxies in clusters and Seyfert properties of the cluster galaxies” Soviet Astronomical Circular and Soviet Astronomy Letters (Russian: Письма в Астрономический журнал)
- Arakelian, M. A. (1983) “Proposing a method for construction of the luminosity function of the components of double galaxies on the basis of an arbitrary sample of pairs of galaxies” Astrophysics
- Arakelian, M. A. (1986) “A method for the determination of the bivariate luminosity function utilizing an incomplete sample with an application to Seyfert galaxies” Astrophysical Journal
- Arakelian, M. A.; Tovmasyan, H.M.; Mirzoyan, L.V.; Hambardzumyan, V.H.[editor] (1973). Astronomy (Third ed.). Yerevan, Armenia: Luys.

== Honors ==
- In 1973, Arakelian became a member of the International Astronomical Union (IAU), and joined Commission #28 “Galaxies”.
- The 621 galaxies in his catalog of galaxies with high surface brightness are designated as “Arakelian galaxies” and carry the designation “ARK” or “Akn” such as galaxies ARK 120 (Akn 120, UGC 03271) and ARK 564 (Akn 564, UGC 12163).

== See also ==
- Yerevan State University
- Saint Petersburg State University
- Moscow State University
- Arakelian catalog
- Active galactic nucleus
- Byurakan Astrophysical Observatory
- Armenian State Pedagogical University
- Astrophysics
