= Invariant imbedding =

Boundary-value problem method

Invariant imbedding (also invariant embedding) is a mathematical technique for solving boundary value problems by embedding the given problem in a family of similar problems that differ in a parameter such as the thickness of a layer. The solution of the original problem is then obtained from a differential equation, usually of Riccati type, that describes how the solution changes with this parameter. In this way a two-point boundary-value problem is converted into an initial value problem, which is often easier to solve numerically. The method originated in radiative transfer and neutron transport theory and has since been applied to wave propagation, optics, control theory, and the theory of localization.

== History ==
The approach goes back to the Armenian astrophysicist Viktor Ambartsumian, who in 1943 derived a nonlinear integral equation for the diffuse reflection of light by a semi-infinite scattering atmosphere. He argued that the reflected intensity cannot change if a thin layer with the same properties as the medium is added on top of it (the principle of invariance). Subrahmanyan Chandrasekhar generalized this to finite layers and anisotropic scattering and introduced the H-function and the X and Y functions in his monograph on radiative transfer. Precursors of the idea are older: Stokes (1862) obtained recurrence relations for the reflection of light by a stack of glass plates by adding one plate at a time, and Schmidt (1905) derived differential equations for beta-ray transmission by varying the thickness of the medium continuously.

The name "invariant imbedding" and the generalization to inhomogeneous media were introduced by Richard Bellman and Robert Kalaba in the 1950s. Together with G. Milton Wing they applied the method to particle transport and other problems of mathematical physics. The mathematically equivalent description of cascaded scattering layers by what is now called the Redheffer star product was given by Raymond Redheffer.

== Principle ==
Consider a plane wave incident from the left on a slab a < z < b with a position-dependent scattering potential v(z), governed by the scalar Helmholtz equation

$$u''(z) + k^2\,[1+v(z)]\,u(z) = 0 .$$

A direct solution for u requires matching boundary conditions at both surfaces of the slab. In invariant imbedding one instead solves for the reflection coefficient R(a) as a function of the position a of the left surface of the slab. Adding a thin layer da at this surface changes R by the reflection from that layer, which is proportional to the square of the total field (incident plus reflected) at z = a. This gives the Riccati equation

$$\frac{dR}{da} = -\frac{ik}{2}\,v(a)\,
\bigl(e^{ika} + R\,e^{-ika}\bigr)^2 ,\qquad R(b)=0 ,$$

an initial-value problem that can be integrated from a = b down to the actual left surface. To lowest order in v it reproduces the Born approximation. An analogous equation holds for the transmission coefficient. For a piecewise constant v the imbedding reduces to a recursion over layers, first given by Stokes, which in X-ray reflectivity is known as the Parratt formalism. The same layer-by-layer composition underlies the transfer-matrix methods of thin-film optics.

== Applications ==
- Radiative transfer and neutron transport: reflection and transmission functions of slabs, planetary atmospheres, and reactor shields.
- Wave propagation in layered or continuously varying media, including seismology, acoustics, and reflectometry.
- Disordered systems: invariant imbedding yields the statistics of the reflection coefficient of a random one-dimensional conductor, and thereby the localization length.
- Optimal control and dynamic programming: Bellman's work on invariant imbedding is closely related to his functional-equation approach to optimization.
- Numerical analysis: conversion of boundary-value problems for ordinary differential equations into stable initial-value problems, avoiding the exponentially growing solutions that plague shooting methods.
