= 1905 Ambartsumian =

Main-belt asteroid

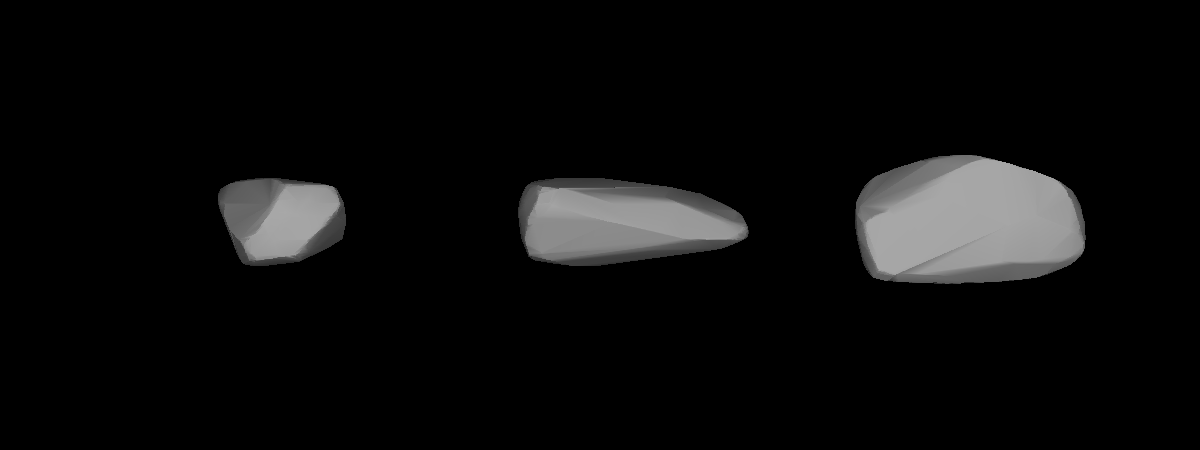
- Lightcurve-based 3D-model of Ambartsumian

Discovery
- Discovered by: T. Smirnova
- Discovery site: Crimean Astrophysical Obs.
- Discovery date: 14 May 1972

Designations
- Named after: Victor Ambartsumian (theoretical astrophysicist)
- Alternative designations: 1972 JZ · 1932 FC; 1952 HO_{3} · 1959 QD; 1962 JX · 1969 PF; 1976 SS_{5}
- Minor planet category: main-belt · (inner)

Orbital characteristics
- Epoch 4 September 2017 (JD 2458000.5)
- Uncertainty parameter 0
- Observation arc: 84.99 yr (31,043 days)
- Aphelion: 2.5842 AU
- Perihelion: 1.8624 AU
- Semi-major axis: 2.2233 AU
- Eccentricity: 0.1623
- Orbital period (sidereal): 3.32 yr (1,211 days)
- Mean anomaly: 224.81°
- Mean motion: 0° 17^{m} 50.28^{s} / day
- Inclination: 2.6158°
- Longitude of ascending node: 201.37°
- Argument of perihelion: 61.590°

Physical characteristics
- Dimensions: 8.008±0.417 km 12±5 km (generic)
- Geometric albedo: 0.229±0.037
- Absolute magnitude (H): 12.8

1905 Ambartsumian, provisional designation 1972 JZ, is an asteroid from the inner regions of the asteroid belt, approximately 8 kilometers in diameter. It was discovered on 14 May 1972, by Russian astronomer Tamara Smirnova at the Crimean Astrophysical Observatory, Nauchnyj, on the Crimean peninsula. The asteroid was named after theoretical astrophysicist Victor Ambartsumian.

== Orbit and classification ==
Ambartsumian orbits the Sun in the inner main-belt at a distance of 1.9–2.6 AU once every 3 years and 4 months (1,211 days). Its orbit has an eccentricity of 0.16 and an inclination of 3° with respect to the ecliptic. It was first identified as 1932 FC at Simeiz Observatory in 1932, extending the body's observation arc by 40 years prior to its official discovery observation.

== Physical characteristics ==
According to the survey carried out by NASA's Wide-field Infrared Survey Explorer with its subsequent NEOWISE mission, Ambartsumian measures 8.0 kilometers in diameter and its surface has an albedo of 0.23. When using a generic diameter-to-magnitude conversion, it has a diameter of 7–17 kilometers, based on an absolute magnitude of 12.8 and an albedo in the range of 0.05–0.25, which accounts for both the brighter stony as well as for the darker carbonaceous spectral types. As of 2017, Ambartsumian's composition, rotation period and shape remain unknown.

== Naming ==
This minor planet was named after Soviet–Armenian theoretical astrophysicist Victor Ambartsumian (1908–1996), founder of the Soviet School for Astrophysics, president of the Academy of Sciences of the Armenian SSR, director of the Byurakan Observatory, and president of the IAU (1961–1964). The official naming citation was published by the Minor Planet Center on 20 February 1976 (M.P.C. 3937).
