= Embedded =

Embedded, embedding, imbedded or imbedding may refer to:

== Science and technology ==
- Embedding, one instance of some mathematical object contained within another instance
  - Graph embedding, in topological graph theory
  - Invariant embedding, in boundary value problems
- Embedded generation, of energy
- Embedding, a part of sample preparation for an electron microscope

=== Computing ===
- Embedded system, a special-purpose system in which the computer is completely encapsulated by the device it controls
- Embedding, installing media into a text document to form a compound document
  - <embed></embed>, a HyperText Markup Language (HTML) element that inserts a non-standard object into the HTML document
- Web embed, an element of a host web page that is substantially independent of the host page
- Font embedding, inclusion of font files inside an electronic document
- Embedding (machine learning), a technique
  - Word embedding, in natural language processing
- Vector embedding, representing concepts and information by reference to similar concepts, in a multi-dimensional space

== Linguistics ==
- Embedded clause, that provides a sentence element with additional information
- Center embedding, recursive nesting of an element in the middle of a similar element

== Arts and entertainment ==
- Embedded journalism, in a military conflict
- Embedded (play), a 2003 play by Tim Robbins about embedded journalists covering military conflict in the US-Iraq war
- Embedded (Mark Seymour album), 2004
- Embedded (Meathook Seed album), 1993
- "Embedded", a song by Job for a Cowboy from the 2007 album Genesis
- Embed Series, works by artist Mark Jenkins
- Embedded, a novel by Dan Abnett
- Embedded (film), a 2016 erotic political thriller film
- Embedded, a news podcast by NPR
- The Embedding, a 1973 science fiction novel by Ian Watson dealing with linguistics

== Other uses ==
- Embeddedness, in economics and economic sociology
- Self-embedding, in psychology, an activity in which one pushes items into one's own flesh in order to feel pain
