= Ivan S. Sokolnikoff =

Russian-American mathematician

Ivan Stephan Sokolnikoff (1901, Chernigov Province, Russian Empire – 16 April 1976, Santa Monica) was a Russian-American applied mathematician, who specialized in elasticity theory and wrote several mathematical textbooks for engineers and physicists.

== Biography ==
Born to a wealthy family in Tsarist Russia, Ivan Sokolnikoff was educated by private tutors and at Anders Classical Gymnasium in Kiev. During the Russian Revolution, as a Tsarist naval officer, he was wounded in combat off the Kuril Islands. With the victory of the Reds, he became a refugee in China. There he worked for a subsidiary of an American electrical firm until 1922 when he became an American immigrant in Seattle. In 1922 he matriculated at the University of Idaho and graduated there with an electrical engineering degree in 1926. In 1930 he received his doctorate in mathematics from the University of Wisconsin-Madison. His doctoral dissertation On a Solution of Laplace's Equation with an Application to the Torsion Problem for a Polygon with Reentrant Angles was written under the supervision of Herman William March. In June 1931 Sokolnikoff married Elizabeth Thatcher Stafford. During the years from 1931 to 1941, they wrote 5 significant papers together, as well as the classic textbook Higher Mathematics for Physicists and Engineers. He joined the mathematics department of the University of Wisconsin–Madison as an instructor in 1927 and was promoted to full professor in 1941. At Wisconsin he was a member of the mathematics faculty until 1944.

During WW II Sokolnikoff lived in New York and Washington and did research on ship gun fire-control for the National Defense Research Council. While Sokolnikoff was on the East Coast, Elizabeth Stafford Sokolnikoff taught mathematics and remained in Madison, Wisconsin. Along with mathematical professors William LeRoy Hart (1892–1984) of the University of Minnesota and William Thomas Reid (1907–1977) of the University of Chicago, he organized a pre-meteorology program in which a number of academic institutions trained meteorologists for the U.S. armed forces. In 1946 he became a mathematics professor at the University of California at Los Angeles (UCLA). There he retired as professor emeritus in 1965. In 1947 he divorced his first wife and married Ruth Lawyer in December of that year.

Sokolnikoff was twice a visiting professor at Brown University. He was also twice a Guggenheim Fellow. His Guggenheim Fellowship for the academic year 1952-1953 was spent partly at the Royal Holloway College, London University and partly at the Free University of Brussels. His Guggenheim Fellowship for the academic year 1959–1960 was spent at the Swiss Federal Institute of Technology in Zürich. For the academic year 1962–1963 he held a Fulbright lecturing fellowship at Ankara's Middle East Technical University.

The textbook written with Elizabeth Stafford was for many years the leading book in the field, and practically an entire generation of young engineers and physicists was mathematically raised on it. Another generation was raised on a new treatment of material on the same level written jointly with Professor Redheffer of the U.C.L.A. mathematics department. Ivan's treatise, The Mathematical Theory of Elasticity, in its several editions, has been for years the leading book on the subject. It has had worldwide acceptance by students and researchers and holds place as a worthy successor and complement to the now classical books by Love and Timoshenko. This was true also for his graduate text, Tensor Analysis and the text on Advanced Calculus. He was an editor of the Quarterly Journal of Applied Mechanics and of the prestigious John Wiley Series in Applied Mathematics.

Ivan Sokolnikoff married (2nd)Ruth Lawyer in December 1947. Their daughter, Katherine Sokolnikoff was born April 15, 1949 in Los Angeles, California. Upon his death he was survived by his widow and a daughter.

== Selected publications ==
=== Articles ===
- Sokolnikoff, I. S. (1931). "On a solution of Laplace's equation with an application to the torsion problem for a polygon with reentrant angles". Transactions of the American Mathematical Society. 33 (3): 719–732. doi:10.1090/S0002-9947-1931-1501612-5. ISSN 0002-9947.
- ——; Sokolnikoff, E. S. (1938). "Torsion of regions bounded by circular arcs". Bulletin of the American Mathematical Society. 44 (6): 384–388. doi:10.1090/S0002-9904-1938-06759-6. ISSN 0002-9904.
- ——; Sokolnikoff, E. S. (1939). "Thermal Stresses in Elastic Plates". Transactions of the American Mathematical Society. 45 (2): 235–255. doi:10.1090/S0002-9947-1939-1501989-8. ISSN 0002-9947. JSTOR 1990115.
- ——; Specht, R. D. (1943). "Two-Dimensional Boundary Value Problems in Potential Theory". Journal of Applied Physics. 14 (2): 91–95. Bibcode:1943JAP....14...91S. doi:10.1063/1.1714955. ISSN 0021-8979.
- —— (1942). "Some new methods of solution of two-dimensional problems in elasticity". Bulletin of the American Mathematical Society. 48 (8): 539–556. doi:10.1090/S0002-9904-1942-07724-X. ISSN 0002-9904.
- ——; Specht, R. D. (1943). "Two-Dimensional Boundary Value Problems in Potential Theory". Journal of Applied Physics. 14 (2): 91–95. Bibcode:1943JAP....14...91S. doi:10.1063/1.1714955. ISSN 0021-8979.
- —— (1951). "Organized Research in the USSR". The Scientific Monthly. 72 (3): 164–168. Bibcode:1951SciMo..72..164S. ISSN 0096-3771. JSTOR 20223.

=== Books ===
- with Elizabeth Stafford Sokolnikoff: Higher Mathematics for Engineers and Physicists , McGraw Hill, 1934, 2nd edition 1941
- Advanced Calculus , McGraw Hill 1939
- The Mathematical Theory of Elasticity , McGraw Hill, 1946, 2nd edition 1956
- Tensor Analysis - theory and applications to geometry and mechanics of continua , Wiley 1951, 2nd edition 1964
- with Raymond Redheffer: Mathematics of physics and modern engineering, McGraw Hill 1958, 2nd edition 1966
