= Akn 564 =

Closest Nitrogen-loud galaxy

Observation data
- Redshift: 0.024
- Distance: 368 mly

Characteristics
- Type: Seyfert galaxy
- Notable features: Nitrogen-loud

Akn 564 is a Seyfert galaxy located around 113 megaparsecs from Earth, notable for being a nitrogen-loud galaxy and the closest of its type located in the local universe. Due to its proximity, it is able to be well-studied. Its proximity also allows it to serve as a close local analog for more distant nitrogen enriched galaxies. It also has a rich Iron abundance and a hot intercloud medium.

== Spectra ==
This galaxy has a complex X-ray spectrum and X-ray light curves of this galaxy show rapid variability but there is no evidence for energy-dependence to these variations.

=== Nitrogen ===
There were prominent [N iv] λ1486 and [N iii] λ1750 emission lines detected through ultraviolet (UV) spectra by using the Hubble Space Telescope (HST). This means that nitrogen is abundant in the gas of the galaxy. The nitrogen abundance seen in Akn 564 is not unique as nitrogen enhancement has been reported in HS 0837+4717, GS3073, CEERS-1019, GN-z11 and etc.

=== Other elements ===
Akn 564 also has a high metallicity with an extreme abundance of iron with a broad and asymmetric Fe Ka line. It also has a high nickel abundance, meaning the galaxy has highly ionized gas.
