= Raymond Redheffer =

American mathematician and inventor

Raymond Moos Redheffer (April 17, 1921 – May 13, 2005) was an American mathematician and inventor. He was the creator of one of the first electronic games, Nim, a knowledge game.

== Early life ==
From 1939 to 1950, Redheffer was an undergraduate and graduate student at MIT and as a Pierce Fellow at Harvard. While in graduate school, he worked at the Radiation Laboratory, a WW II research laboratory developing radar, and the Research Laboratory of Electronics, which were both part of MIT. He taught as a Benjamin Peirce Fellow at Harvard from 1948 to 1950. He earned his PhD in 1948 from the Massachusetts Institute of Technology under Norman Levinson. (Note: He and Levinson would later write the 1970 book Complex Variable.Redheffer, Raymond, Norman; Levinson (1970). Complex Variables. Holden-Day. ISBN 978-0-07-037492-8.)

== Career ==
In 1949, Redheffer and co-inventors Edward B. McMillan and Herbert Leaderman applied for a patent for a dielectric wall for the transmission of microwave radiation. In 1950, Redheffer began teaching mathematics at UCLA. In 1953, he was awarded the patent for a computer for evaluating complex integrals. Later that year, he was awarded a patent for a computing machine. Both patents were assigned to the U.S. Navy. In November of that same year, Redheffer, McMillan, and Leaderman were awarded the 1953 patent for their 1949 dielectric patent application, with the patent assigned to McMillan In the world of mathematics, Redheffer would later be known for the Redheffer star product which he had introduced in 1959. Redheffer and McMillan were awarded a 1960 patent for another dielectric wall application, this for a more generalized application, which was a dielectric wall for transmission of electromagnetic radiation.

In 1961, he collaborated with Charles Eames on a series of animated short films about mathematics for the exhibition at the California Museum of Science and Industry in Los Angeles. He later worked and with Eames on his 1966 timeline of mathematics entitled Men of Modern Mathematics which was printed and distributed by IBM. In that same year, notable and unusual is the physically motivated discussion of the functions of vector calculus in his book with Ivan Sokolnikoff, Mathematics of Physics and Modern Engineering (1966). Eleven years later, his paper An explicitly solvable optimization task (1977) was the source for what is now the Redheffer matrix and was also a notable mathematical achievement.

His teaching skills were acknowledged 6 decades later by one of his students. He taught for 55 years at the University of California, Los Angeles, writing more than 200 research papers, ranging from microwave analysis and dielectric constants, and three textbooks. He may have invented a version of Nim with electronic components.

== Recognition ==
- UCLA Distinguished Teaching Award (1969).

== Books ==
- Sokolnikoff, Ivan Stephen; Redheffer, Raymond M. (1966). Mathematics of Physics and Modern Engineering. McGraw-Hill. ISBN 978-0-07-059625-2.
- Levinson, Norman; Redheffer, Raymond M. (1970), Complex Variables, Holden-Day, ISBN 978-0-07-037492-8.
- Redheffer, Raymond M. (1991), Differential equations : theory and applications, Jones & Bartlett Publishers, ISBN 0-86720-200-9.
- Redheffer, Raymond M. (1992), Introduction to Differential Equations, Jones & Bartlett Publishers, ISBN 978-0-86720-289-2.

== Filmography ==
Films created by Redheffer and the Eames Office:

- Alpha (1972), 1 minute, 16 seconds stop-motion animated color film on algebraic expressions.
- Two Laws of Algebra: Distributive & Associative (1972), 4 minute animated film. Music by Laurindo Almeida.
- Exponents: A Study in Generalization (1972), a short animated film.
