= Leonard Searle =

American astronomer

Leonard Searle

Leonard Searle (October 23, 1930 – July 2, 2010) was an English-born American astronomer who worked on theories of the Big Bang. He was born in Mitcham, a suburb of London, and studied at St Andrews in Scotland and Princeton in New Jersey. After receiving his doctorate he started working at the University of Toronto in 1953, leaving in 1960 for the California Institute of Technology. In 1963 he moved to Australia for a post at the Mount Stromlo Observatory, before settling finally at the Carnegie observatories in Pasadena, California, in 1968. In 1989 he became director of the Carnegie Observatories. In 1996 University of Warsaw awarded him doctorate honoris causa (supervised by Marcin Kubiak).

Searle's work focused on the conditions of the Big Bang and the early universe, and on the formation of heavy elements in stars. One of his main fields of study was the abundance of helium in the early universe. With Wallace Sargent he developed a model to calculate the hydrogen-to-helium composition of galaxies. As director of the Carnegie Observatories, he was also central to the construction of the Las Campanas Observatory in Chile, considered the best natural imaging telescopes in the world. Searle married Eleanor Millard, whom he met at Princeton, in 1952. Eleanor Searle, a medieval historian, died in 1999.
