= Viktor Sobolev (scientist) =

- Born: 2 September 1915; Petrograd, Russian Empire
- Died: 7 January 1999 (aged 83); Saint Petersburg, Russia
- Education: Leningrad State University
- Known for: Astrophysics
- Awards: Hero of Socialist Labour (1985); Order of Lenin; Two Orders of the Red Banner of Labour
- Scientific career
- Fields: Astronomy, physics
- Workplaces: Saint Petersburg State University

Viktor Viktorovich Sobolev (Russian: Виктор Викторович Соболев; September 2, 1915 – January 7, 1999) was a Soviet and Russian astrophysicist, Academician of the Russian Academy of Sciences, Academician of the Academy of Sciences of the USSR (since 1981), Hero of Socialist Labour (1985).

== Biography ==
He was born in Petrograd, and studied at the Leningrad State University from 1933 to 1938, and in 1948, he received the title of Professor. He was elected a corresponding member of the Academy of Sciences of the USSR in 1958.

== Sources ==
- (in Russian)
- (in Russian)
