= Redheffer star product =

Binary operation

In mathematics, the Redheffer star product is a binary operation on linear operators that arises in connection to solving coupled systems of linear equations. It was introduced by Raymond Redheffer in 1959, and has subsequently been widely adopted in computational methods for scattering matrices. Given two scattering matrices from different linear scatterers, the Redheffer star product yields the combined scattering matrix produced when some or all of the output channels of one scatterer are connected to inputs of another scatterer.

== Definition ==
Suppose $A, B$ are the block matrices
$$A =
\begin{pmatrix}
A_{11} & A_{12}
\\
A_{21} & A_{22}
\end{pmatrix}$$
and
$$B =
\begin{pmatrix}
B_{11} & B_{12}
\\
B_{21} & B_{22}
\end{pmatrix}$$
, whose blocks $A_{ij}, B_{kl}$ have the same shape when $ij = kl$. The Redheffer star product is then defined by:

$$A \star B =
\begin{pmatrix}
B_{11} (I - A_{12} B_{21})^{-1} A_{11} & B_{12} + B_{11} (I - A_{12} B_{21})^{-1} A_{12} B_{22}
\\
A_{21} + A_{22} (I - B_{21} A_{12})^{-1} B_{21} A_{11} & A_{22} (I - B_{21} A_{12})^{-1} B_{22}
\end{pmatrix}$$,

assuming that $(I - A_{12} B_{21}), (I - B_{21} A_{12})$ are invertible, where $I$ is an identity matrix conformable to $A_{12} B_{21}$ or $B_{21} A_{12}$, respectively. This can be rewritten several ways making use of the so-called push-through identity $(I - A B) A = A (I - B A) \iff A (I - B A)^{-1} = (I - A B)^{-1} A$.

Redheffer's definition extends beyond matrices to linear operators on a Hilbert space $\mathcal H$. . By definition, $A_{ij}, B_{kl}$ are linear endomorphisms of $\mathcal H$, making $A, B$ linear endomorphisms of $\mathcal H \oplus \mathcal H$, where $\oplus$ is the direct sum. However, the star product still makes sense as long as the transformations are compatible, which is possible when $A \in \mathcal{L (H_\gamma \oplus H_\alpha, H_\alpha \oplus H_\gamma)}$ and $B \in \mathcal{L (H_\alpha \oplus H_\beta, H_\beta \oplus H_\alpha)}$ so that $A \star B \in \mathcal{L (H_\gamma \oplus H_\beta, H_\beta \oplus H_\gamma)}$.

== Properties ==
=== Existence ===
$(I - A_{12} B_{21})^{-1}$ exists if and only if $(I - B_{21} A_{12})^{-1}$ exists. Thus when either exists, so does the Redheffer star product.

=== Identity ===
The star identity is the identity on $\mathcal H \oplus \mathcal H$, or
$$\begin{pmatrix} I & 0 \\ 0 & I \end{pmatrix}$$.

=== Associativity ===
The star product is associative, provided all of the relevant matrices are defined. Thus $A \star B \star C = (A \star B) \star C = A \star (B \star C)$.

=== Adjoint ===
Provided either side exists, the adjoint of a Redheffer star product is $(A \star B)^* = B^* \star A^*$.

=== Inverse ===
If $B$ is the left matrix inverse of $A$ such that $BA = I$, $A_{22}$ has a right inverse, and $A \star B$ exists, then $A \star B = I$. Similarly, if $B$ is the left matrix inverse of $A$ such that $BA = I$, $A_{11}$ has a right inverse, and $B \star A$ exists, then $B \star A = I$.

Also, if $A \star B = I$ and $A_{22}$ has a left inverse then $BA = I$.

The star inverse equals the matrix inverse and both can be computed with block inversion as

$$\begin{pmatrix}
A_{11} & A_{12}
\\
A_{21} & A_{22}
\end{pmatrix}^{-1}
=
\begin{pmatrix}
(A_{11} - A_{12} A_{22}^{-1} A_{21})^{-1} & (A_{21} - A_{22} A_{12}^{-1} A_{11})^{-1}
\\
(A_{12} - A_{11} A_{21}^{-1} A_{22})^{-1} & (A_{22} - A_{21} A_{11}^{-1} A_{12})^{-1}
\end{pmatrix}$$.

== Derivation from a linear system ==
The coupled system of equations, with arrows labeling the inputs and outputs to each matrix

The star product arises from solving multiple linear systems of equations that share variables in common. Often, each linear system models the behavior of one subsystem in a physical process and by connecting the multiple subsystems into a whole, one can eliminate variables shared across subsystems in order to obtain the overall linear system. For instance, let $\{ x_i \}_{i=1}^6$ be elements of a Hilbert space $\mathcal H$ such that

$$\begin{pmatrix}
x_3
\\
x_6
\end{pmatrix}
=
\begin{pmatrix}
A_{11} & A_{12}
\\
A_{21} & A_{22}
\end{pmatrix}
\begin{pmatrix}
x_5
\\
x_4
\end{pmatrix}$$

and

$$\begin{pmatrix}
x_1
\\
x_4
\end{pmatrix}
=
\begin{pmatrix}
B_{11} & B_{12}
\\
B_{21} & B_{22}
\end{pmatrix}
\begin{pmatrix}
x_3
\\
x_2
\end{pmatrix}$$

The "plumbing" of one of Redheffer's systems of equations.

giving the following $4$ equations in $6$ variables:

$$\begin{align}
x_3 &= A_{11} x_5 + A_{12} x_4
\\
x_6 &= A_{21} x_5 + A_{22} x_4
\\
x_1 &= B_{11} x_3 + B_{12} x_2
\\
x_4 &= B_{21} x_3 + B_{22} x_2
\end{align}$$.

By substituting the first equation into the last we find:

$x_4 = (I - B_{21}A_{12})^{-1} (B_{21}A_{11} x_5 + B_{22} x_2)$.

By substituting the last equation into the first we find:

$x_3 = (I - A_{12}B_{21})^{-1} (A_{11} x_5 + A_{12}B_{22} x_2)$.

Eliminating $x_3, x_4$ by substituting the two preceding equations into those for $x_1, x_6$ results in the Redheffer star product being the matrix such that:

The star product eliminates the shared variables in this coupled system of equations.

$$\begin{pmatrix}
x_1
\\
x_6
\end{pmatrix}
= (A \star B)
\begin{pmatrix}
x_5
\\
x_2
\end{pmatrix}$$.

== Connection to scattering matrices ==
The "plumbing" of the scattering matrix has a different convention than Redheffer that amounts to swapping and relabeling several quantities. The advantage is that now the S-matrix's subscripts label the input and output ports as well as the block indices.

Many scattering processes take on a form that motivates a different convention for the block structure of the linear system of a scattering matrix. Typically a physical device that performs a linear transformation on inputs, such as linear dielectric media on electromagnetic waves or in quantum mechanical scattering, can be encapsulated as a system which interacts with the environment through various ports, each of which accepts inputs and returns outputs. It is conventional to use a different notation for the Hilbert space, $\mathcal H_i$, whose subscript labels a port on the device. Additionally, any element, $c_i^\pm \in \mathcal H_i$, has an additional superscript labeling the direction of travel (where + indicates moving from port i to i+1 and - indicates the reverse).

The equivalent notation for a Redheffer transformation, $R \in \mathcal{L (H_1 \oplus H_2, H_2 \oplus H_1)}$, used in the previous section is

$$\begin{pmatrix}
c_2^+
\\
c_1^-
\end{pmatrix}
=
\begin{pmatrix}
R_{11} & R_{12}
\\
R_{21} & R_{22}
\end{pmatrix}
\begin{pmatrix}
c_1^+
\\
c_2^-
\end{pmatrix}$$.

The action of the S-matrix, $S \in \mathcal{L (H_1 \oplus H_2, H_1 \oplus H_2)}$, is defined with an additional flip compared to Redheffer's definition:

$$\begin{pmatrix}
c_1^-
\\
c_2^+
\end{pmatrix}
=
\begin{pmatrix}
S_{11} & S_{12}
\\
S_{21} & S_{22}
\end{pmatrix}
\begin{pmatrix}
c_1^+
\\
c_2^-
\end{pmatrix}$$,

so
$$S =
\begin{pmatrix}
0 & I
\\
I & 0
\end{pmatrix}
R$$
. Note that in order for the off-diagonal identity matrices to be defined, we require $\mathcal{H_1, H_2}$ be the same underlying Hilbert space. (The subscript does not imply any difference, but is just a label for bookkeeping.)

The star product, $\star_S$, for two S-matrices, $A, B$, is given by

The "plumbing" of a coupled pair of scattering matrices in a star product.

$$A \star_S B
=
\begin{pmatrix}
A_{11} + A_{12} (I - B_{11} A_{22})^{-1} B_{11} A_{21} &
A_{12} (I - B_{11} A_{22})^{-1} B_{12}
\\
B_{21} (I - A_{22} B_{11})^{-1} A_{21} &
B_{22} + B_{21} (I - A_{22} B_{11})^{-1} A_{22} B_{12}
\end{pmatrix}$$,

where $A \in \mathcal{L (H_1 \oplus H_2, H_1 \oplus H_2)}$ and $B \in \mathcal{L (H_2 \oplus H_3, H_2 \oplus H_3)}$, so $A \star_S B \in \mathcal{L (H_1 \oplus H_3, H_1 \oplus H_3)}$.

=== Properties ===
These are analogues of the properties of $\star$ for $\star_S$ Most of them follow from the correspondence $J(A \star B) = (JA) \star_S (JB)$. $J$, the exchange operator, is also the S-matrix star identity defined below. For the rest of this section, $A,B,C$ are S-matrices.

==== Existence ====
$A \star_S B$ exists when either $(I - A_{22} B_{11})^{-1}$ or $(I - B_{11} A_{22})^{-1}$ exist.

==== Identity ====
The S-matrix star identity, $J$, is
$$J =
\begin{pmatrix}
0 & I
\\
I & 0
\end{pmatrix}$$
. This means $J \star_S S = S \star_S J = S$

==== Associativity ====
Associativity of $\star_S$ follows from associativity of $\star$ and of matrix multiplication.

==== Adjoint ====
From the correspondence between $\star$ and $\star_S$, and the adjoint of $\star$, we have that $(A \star_S B)^* = J (B^* \star_S A^*) J$

==== Inverse ====
The matrix $\Sigma$ that is the S-matrix star product inverse of $S$ in the sense that $\Sigma \star_S S = S \star_S \Sigma = J$ is $JS^{-1}J$ where $S^{-1}$ is the ordinary matrix inverse and $J$ is as defined above.

=== Connection to transfer matrices ===
Transfer matrices have a different "plumbing" than scattering matrices. They connect one port to another instead of the inputs at all ports to the outputs at all ports.

Observe that a scattering matrix can be rewritten as a transfer matrix, $T$, with action
$$\begin{pmatrix}
c_2^+
\\
c_2^-
\end{pmatrix}
= T
\begin{pmatrix}
c_1^+
\\
c_1^-
\end{pmatrix}$$
, where

$$T =
\begin{pmatrix}
T_{\scriptscriptstyle ++} & T_{\scriptscriptstyle +-}
\\
T_{\scriptscriptstyle -+} & T_{\scriptscriptstyle --}
\end{pmatrix}
=
\begin{pmatrix}
S_{21} - S_{22} S_{12}^{-1} S_{11} & S_{22} S_{12}^{-1}
\\
- S_{12}^{-1} S_{11} & S_{12}^{-1}
\end{pmatrix}$$.

Here the subscripts relate the different directions of propagation at each port. As a result, the star product of scattering matrices

$$\begin{pmatrix}
c_3^+
\\
c_1^-
\end{pmatrix}
= (S^A \star S^B)
\begin{pmatrix}
c_1^+
\\
c_3^-
\end{pmatrix}$$,

is analogous to the following matrix multiplication of transfer matrices

$$\begin{pmatrix}
c_3^+
\\
c_3^-
\end{pmatrix}
= (T^A T^B)
\begin{pmatrix}
c_1^+
\\
c_1^-
\end{pmatrix}$$,

where $T^A \in \mathcal{L (H_1 \oplus H_1, H_2 \oplus H_2)}$ and $T^B \in \mathcal{L (H_2 \oplus H_2, H_3 \oplus H_3)}$, so $T^A T^B \in \mathcal{L (H_1 \oplus H_1, H_3 \oplus H_3)}$.

== Generalizations ==
Redheffer generalized the star product in several ways:

=== Arbitrary bijections ===
If there is a bijection $M \leftrightarrow L$ given by $L = f(M)$ then an associative star product can be defined by:

$A \star B = f^{-1} (f(A) f(B))$.

The particular star product defined by Redheffer above is obtained from:

$f(A) = ((I - A) + (I + A) J)^{-1} ((A - I) + (A + I) J)$

where $J(x, y) = (-x, y)$.

=== 3x3 star product ===
A star product can also be defined for 3x3 matrices.

== Applications to scattering matrices ==
In physics, the Redheffer star product appears when constructing a total scattering matrix from two or more subsystems. If system $A$ has a scattering matrix $S^A$ and system $B$ has scattering matrix $S^B$, then the combined system $AB$ has scattering matrix $S^{AB} = S^A \star S^B$.

=== Transmission line theory ===
Many physical processes, including radiative transfer, neutron diffusion, circuit theory, and others are described by scattering processes whose formulation depends on the dimension of the process and the representation of the operators. For probabilistic problems, the scattering equation may appear in a Kolmogorov-type equation.

=== Electromagnetism ===
The Redheffer star product can be used to solve for the propagation of electromagnetic fields in stratified, multilayered media. Each layer in the structure has its own scattering matrix and the total structure's scattering matrix can be described as the star product between all of the layers. A free software program that simulates electromagnetism in layered media is the Stanford Stratified Structure Solver.

=== Semiconductor interfaces ===
Kinetic models of consecutive semiconductor interfaces can use a scattering matrix formulation to model the motion of electrons between the semiconductors.

=== Factorization on graphs ===
In the analysis of Schrödinger operators on graphs, the scattering matrix of a graph can be obtained as a generalized star product of the scattering matrices corresponding to its subgraphs.
