= Robyn McCutcheon =

American diplomat, engineer and historian

Robyn Alice McCutcheon
- Education: University of Virginia Yale University Georgetown University
- Occupations: American diplomat, astronomical engineer, and historian of science
- Employer(s): United States Department of State; NASA
- Known for: Being the first transgender US Foreign Services Officer to transition overseas; LGBTQIA+ activism
- Notable work: Queer Diplomacy: A Transgender Journey in the Foreign Service

Robyn Alice McCutcheon is an American diplomat, engineer and historian of science. She served as a United States Foreign Service Officer from 2004-2019 in the countries of Kazakhstan, Russia, Romania, and Uzbekistan. She was the first openly transgender woman to transition overseas during her term with the US Department of State.

== Biography and career ==
Robyn McCutcheon was born on August 15, 1954 to mother Margaret Cecelia (née Geoghegan) and father Allen McCutcheon.

After receiving an undergraduate degree from the University of Virginia, McCutcheon received a master's degree in astronomy from Yale University and a master's degree in Russian studies from Georgetown University. She was previously an astronomer and historian. She is known for her work on the history of Soviet astronomy. She also has several publications to her credit on the history of Soviet and Russian science during the Stalin period. She became a member of the American Astronomical Society (AAS) in 1983 and was a member of the Historical Astronomy Division (HAD) of the AAS and chair of the AAS International Relations Committee. She formerly worked at the Space Telescope Science Institute and the Computer Sciences Corporation. She also worked as an engineer on NASA missions, primarily Hubble Space Telescope.

She joined the US Department of State in 2004 and became a Foreign Service Officer in several countries, including Russia, Romania, Kazakhstan. She served at the Nuclear Risk Reduction Center in 2013–14. McCutcheon is a trans woman and is the first Foreign Service Officer to transition while posted overseas. She transitioned in 2011 in Romania. She also served as president of glifaa, LGBTQIA+ pride in foreign affairs agencies. McCutcheon retired from the Foreign Service in 2019.

In 2024, McCutcheon published a memoir with Westphalia Press called Queer Diplomacy: A Transgender Journey in the Foreign Service.

== Publications ==
- McCutcheon, Robyn., & Ambartsumian, V. A. (October 2, 1987). "V. A. Ambartsumian" American Institute of Physics.
- McCutcheon, Robyn A. "The 1936-1937 purge of Soviet astronomers." Slavic Review 50, no. 1 (1991): 100-117. JSTOR 2500602
- Bronshten, Vitalii A., and Robyn A. McCutcheon. "VT Ter-Oganezov, ideologist of Soviet astronomy." Journal for the History of Astronomy 26, no. 4 (1995): 325-348.
- Doel, Ronald. E., and Robyn A. McCutcheon, eds. "Astronomy and the State: CIS Perspectives," a special issue of Journal for the History of Astronomy, no. 4 (1995).
- McCutcheon, Robyn. (August 19, 2003). "Russia’s Astronomy Icon Nears Rebirth". Sky & Telescope.
- McCutcheon, Robyn A. (November 14, 2017). "Why Is The U.S. Denying This Young Trans Woman A Student Visa?". HuffPost.
- McCutcheon, Robyn A. (March 7, 2018). "U.S. Consuls Already Have The Tools To Discriminate In Visa Decisions". HuffPost.
- McCutcheon, Robyn A. (November 10, 2018). "A Transgender American Diplomat Who Does Not Exist." HuffPost.
- McCutcheon, Robyn. (July 20, 2020). "Postoiev’s great comet journey: Tashkent to São Paulo" OCA MAGAZINE.
- McCutcheon, Robyn. (2024). "Queer Diplomacy: A Transgender Journey in the Foreign Service" Westphalia Press.
  - This publication is a part of the Association for Diplomatic Studies and Training (ADST) Memoirs and Occasional Papers Series.
    - ADST’s mission is to capture, preserve, and share the experiences of America’s diplomats. ADST has the world’s largest collection of U.S. diplomatic oral histories, as well as podcasts, videos, books, publications, and a “Moments in U.S. Diplomatic History” online series.
- McCutcheon, Robyn. (May 12, 2025). "Lessons from Uzbekistan on surviving tariffs". Bangor Daily News.
