= Astrophysics (journal) =

Peer-reviewed scientific journal

- Discipline: Astrophysics
- Language: English
- Edited by: Arthur Nikoghossian

Publication details
- History: 1965–present
- Publisher: Springer
- Frequency: Quarterly
- Impact factor: 0.717 (2020)

Standard abbreviations
- ISO 4: Astrophysics

Indexing
- ISSN: 0571-7256 (print); 1573-8191 (web)

Links
- Journal homepage

Astrophysics is a peer-reviewed scientific journal of astrophysics published by Springer. Each volume is published every three months. It was founded in 1965 by the Soviet Armenian astrophysicist Viktor Ambartsumian. It is the English version of the journal Astrofizika, published by the Armenian National Academy of Sciences mostly in Russian. The current editor-in-chief is Arthur Nikoghossian.

== Aims and scope ==
The focus of this journal is astronomy and is a translation of the peer-reviewed Russian language journal Astrofizika.

== Abstracting and indexing ==
Astrophysics is indexed in the following databases:

- Astrophysics Data System
- Academic OneFile
- Academic Search
- Chemical Abstracts Service
- CSA
- CSA Environmental Sciences
- Current Contents/Physical
- Chemical and Earth Sciences
- Earthquake Engineering Abstracts
- EBSCO Discovery Service
- Expanded Academic
- INIS Atomindex
- INSPEC
- INSPIRE-HEP
- Journal Citation Reports/Science Edition
- Science Citation Index Expanded
- SCImago
- SCOPUS
- Simbad Astronomical Database
- Summon by ProQuest

== See also ==
- List of astronomy journals
