= Byurakan Observatory =

Byurakan Observatory Բյուրականի աստղադիտարան
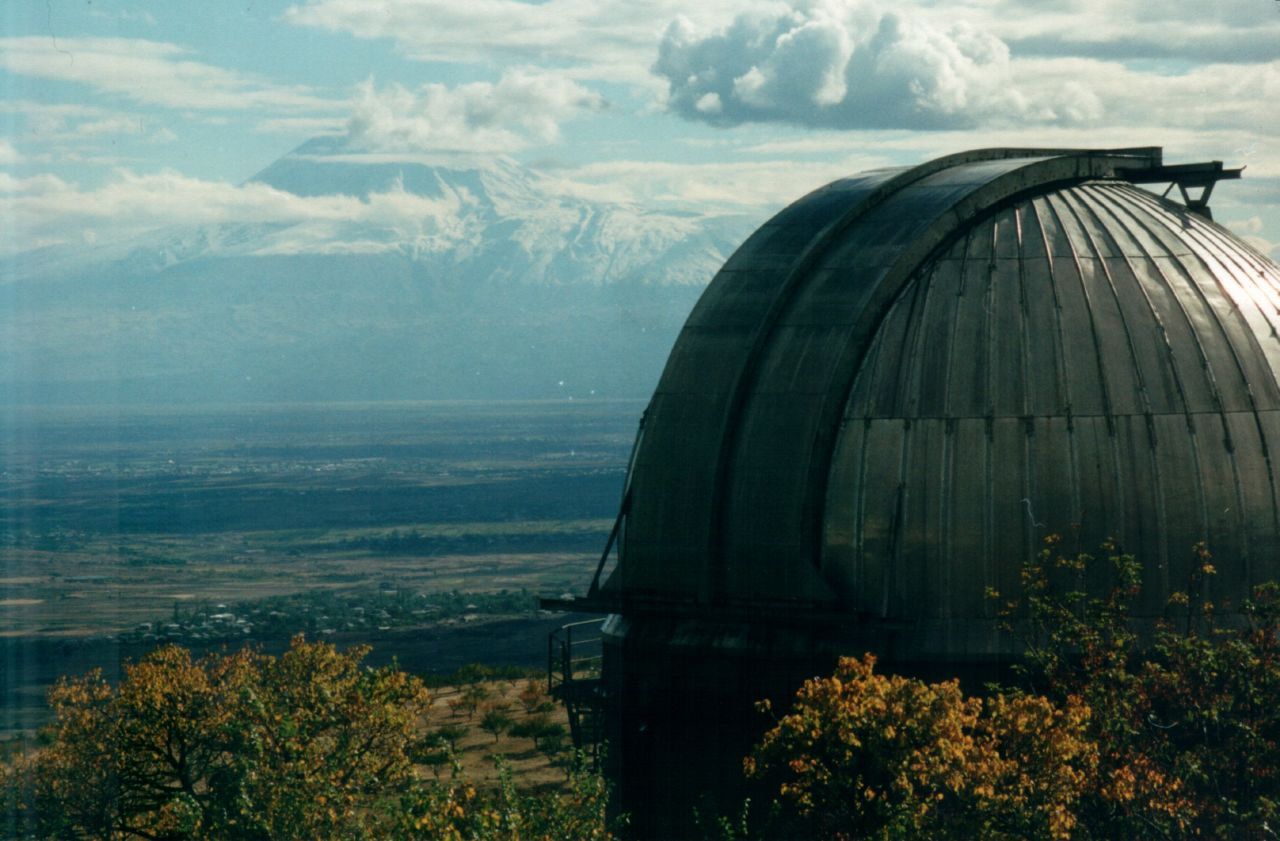
- Alternative names: Byurakan Astrophysical Observatory
- Named after: Viktor Ambartsumian
- Organization: Armenian Academy of Sciences
- Observatory code: 123
- Location: Mount Aragats, Armenia
- Coordinates: 40°19′51″N 44°16′06″E
- Altitude: 1,400 m (4,600 ft)
- Website: bao.am

Telescopes
- telescope: 2.6 m Cassegrain reflector 40°19′49″N 44°16′24″E
- telescope: 1 m Schmidt reflector
- telescope: 50 cm Schmidt reflector
- Related media on Commons

The Byurakan Astrophysical Observatory, or Byurakan Observatory (Armenian: Բյուրականի աստղադիտարան, romanized: Byurakani astghaditaran) is an astronomical observatory owned and operated by the Armenian Academy of Sciences. It is located on the slope of Mount Aragats in the village of Byurakan in Armenia.

== History ==
Founded in 1946 by Viktor Hambardzumyan, it was one of the main astronomy centers of the USSR. The buildings were designed by architect Samvel Safarian. The hotel, central building and structures are for astronomical instruments. The observatory has discovered special star clusters — stellar associations (1947), more than 1,000 flare stars, dozens of supernovae, hundreds of Herbig–Haro objects and cometary nebulae, hundreds of galaxies.

The first conference was held in November 1951 on the topic of stellar associations. On 19 September 1956 a major meeting on non-stable stars was held. It has been the site of two major conferences on SETI, and is recognised as the regional center for astronomical research.

Directors included V.A. Ambartsumian till 1988, E.Ye. Khachikian till 1993, H.A. Harutyunian from 1993 to 1994, and A.R. Petrosian from 1994 to 1999. Khachikian returned as director from 1999 to 2003 and Harutyunian also returned after this.

== Equipment ==
Byurakan Observatory's main telescope is a 2.6 m Cassegrain reflector, along with a 1 and 0.5 m Schmidt camera as well as other smaller telescopes.

== Results ==
The First Byurakan Survey commenced in 1965 using the Schmidt telescope. It revealed 1500 galaxies with ultraviolet excess known as the Markarian galaxies. These galaxies are designated "Markarian" or "Mrk" followed by a number, for example Mrk 501.The Byurakan spectral survey of Markarian's sky is included in the international register of the UNESCO Memory of the World program. The "ultraviolet excess" technique was pioneered by American astronomer Nancy Roman who had been invited and attended the dedication of Byurakan Observatory in 1956, a rare Cold War occurrence.

The Second Byurakan Survey, 1974 to 1991, looked for emission line and ultraviolet excess galaxies, and quasars as well.

== Gallery ==
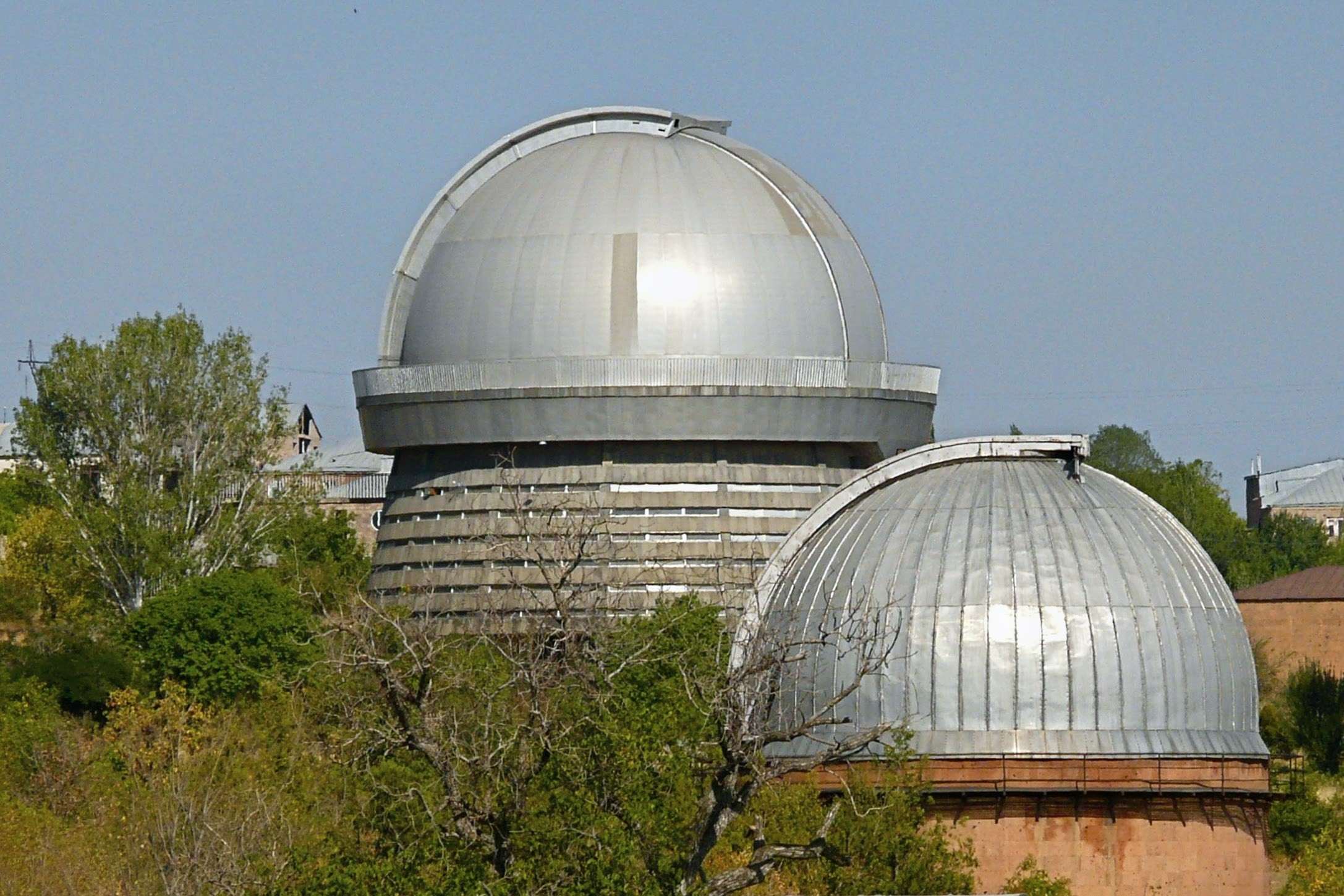
More telescopes at the Observatory

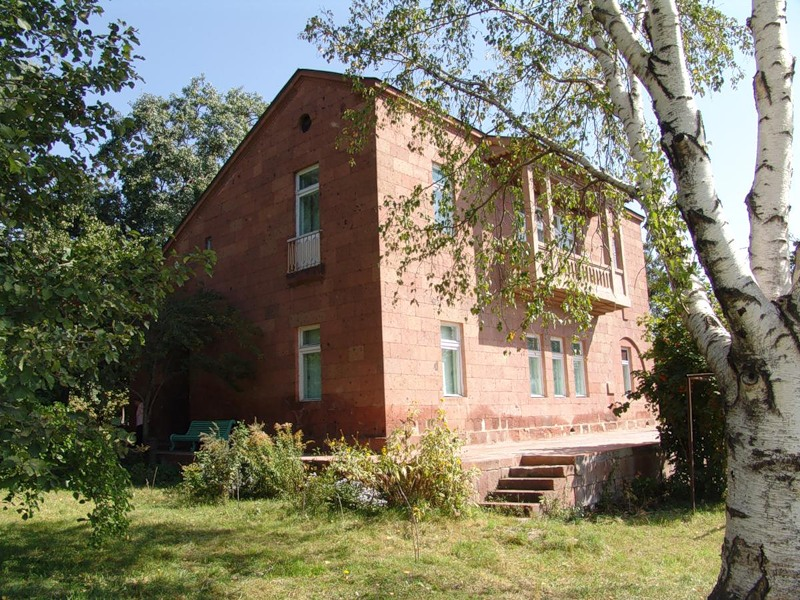
Viktor Hambardzumyan’s house in Byurakan, now museum

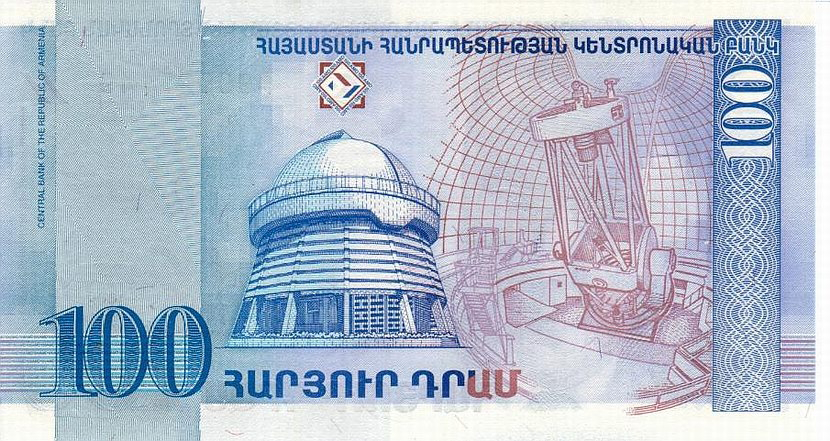
Byurakan Observatory was featured on the reverse of the 100 Dram banknotes in 1998

== See also ==
- List of astronomical observatories
- Markarian Galaxies, discovered in this building.
- Orgov Radio-Optical Telescope, also on Mount Aragats
