= Institute of Mathematics of National Academy of Sciences of Armenia =

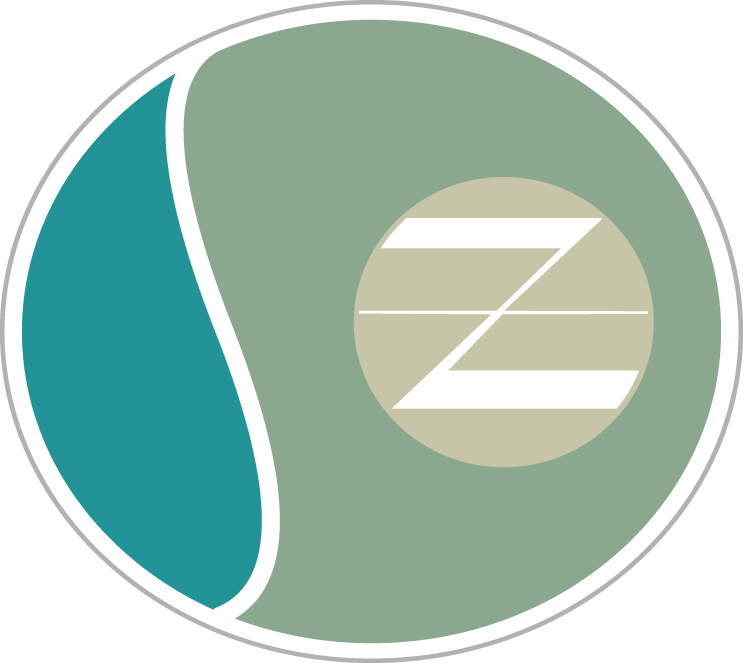
- Established: 1 July 1971
- Location: Yerevan, Armenia; 40°11′33.26″N 44°30′29″E
- Director: Rafik Aramyan
- Website: math.sci.am

The Institute of Mathematics of National Academy of Sciences of Armenia (Armenian: Հայաստանի ԳԱԱ մաթեմատիկայի ինստիտուտ) is owned and operated by the Armenian Academy of Sciences, located in Yerevan.

== History ==
The Institute of Mathematics of National Academy of Sciences of Armenia originated as the Section for Mathematics and Mechanics, created within the newly formed Armenian Academy of Sciences in 1944. The section later developed into an Institute of Mathematics and Mechanics of the Armenian Academy of Sciences, whose first Director was academician Artashes Shahinian, known for his results in complex analysis. The Institute of Mathematics of Armenian Academy of Sciences separated from the latter Institute in 1971. The bearer of the office of the Director of Institute has been academician Mkhitar Djrbashian (1971-1989, 1989-1994 Honorary Director).

The academicians Sergey Mergelyan, Norair Arakelian, Alexandr Talalyan, Raphayel Alexandrian, Rouben V. Ambartzumian and Anry Nersesyan also have greatly influenced the formation of the scientific profile of the Institute and largely contributed to mathematics in general. In particular Rouben V. Ambartzumian is famous for his work in Stochastic Geometry and Integral Geometry, where he created a new branch called Combinatorial Integral Geometry. He has provided solutions to a number of classical problems in particular the solution to the Buffon Sylvester problem as well as the Hilbert's fourth problem in dimensions 2 and 3.

In the early years, the investigations carried out in the Institute concentrated on Function Theory. Gradually the sphere of investigations expanded and now includes Differential and Integral Equations, Functional Analysis, Probability Theory and Mathematical Statistics.

== Journals ==
The institute publishes a journal, Izvestia NAS RA Matematika. The founder and the first Editor in Chief (1971–1990) of the journal was Mkhitar Djrbashian; under Rouben V. Ambartzumian Editor in Chief (1990 - 2010) the journal obtained international recognition and obtained an English version, Journal of Contemporary Mathematical Analysis, published initially by Allerton Press, Inc. New York and later by Springer Science+Business Media. The journal covers a wide range of topics, including: real analysis and complex analysis; approximation theory, boundary value problems; integral geometry and stochastic geometry; differential equations; probability and statistics; integral equations; algebra.

== Directors, faculty and members ==
At present the Institute has about 30 main researchers as well as a number of associate researchers from Yerevan State University.

Norair Arakelian in 1970 (Nice) and Mkhitar Djrbashian, Rouben V. Ambartzumian in 1974 (Vancouver) were invited speakers at the International Congresses of Mathematicians.

Directors of the IM NAS
Name	Term
Mkhitar Djrbashian	1971-1989
Norair Arakelian	1989-1991
Alexandr Talalyan	1991-1997
Norair Arakelian	1997-2006
Bagrat Batikyan	2006-2010
Valeri Martirosyan	2011-2012
Rafayel Barkhudaryan	2012–2019
Grigori Karagulyan	2019–2022
Raik Aramyan	2022–present

== See also ==
- Armenian National Academy of Sciences
- Byurakan Observatory
- Education in Armenia
- List of International Congresses of Mathematicians Plenary and Invited Speakers
- Mikael Ter-Mikaelian Institute for Physical Research
- Science and technology in Armenia
- USSR State Prize
- Rollo Davidson Prize
