= Hartogs–Rosenthal theorem =

Theorem in complex analysis

In mathematics, the Hartogs–Rosenthal theorem is a classical result in complex analysis on the uniform approximation of continuous functions on compact subsets of the complex plane by rational functions. The theorem was proved in 1931 by the German mathematicians Friedrich Hartogs and Arthur Rosenthal and has been widely applied, particularly in operator theory.

== Statement ==
The Hartogs–Rosenthal theorem states that if K is a compact subset of the complex plane with Lebesgue measure zero, then any continuous complex-valued function on K can be uniformly approximated by rational functions.

== Proof ==
By the Stone–Weierstrass theorem any complex-valued continuous function on K can be uniformly approximated by a polynomial in $z$ and $\overline{z}$.

So it suffices to show that $\overline{z}$ can be uniformly approximated by a rational function on K.

Let g(z) be a smooth function of compact support on C equal to 1 on K and set

$$f(z)=g(z)\cdot \overline{z}.$$

By the generalized Cauchy integral formula

$$f(z) =  \frac{1}{2\pi i}\iint_{{C\backslash K}} \frac{\partial f}{\partial \bar{w}}\frac{dw\wedge d\bar{w}}{w-z},$$

since K has measure zero.

Restricting z to K and taking Riemann approximating sums for the integral on the right hand side yields the required uniform approximation of $\bar{z}$ by a rational function.

== See also ==
- Runge's theorem
- Mergelyan's theorem
