= Anry Nersessian =

Armenian mathematician

- Born: 27 February 1936 (age 89); Mergrashen, Armenia
- Other names: Nersesyan, A.; Nersesjan, A.; Nersesian, A.
- Occupation: Armenian mathematician

Anry Nersessian (Armenian: Հանրի Ներսիսյան born 27 February 1936) is an Armenian mathematician, specializing in differential and integral equations, functional and numerical analysis. He is known for fractional derivatives introduced by the joint work with Mkhitar Djrbashian. Separately, M. Caputo considered the same modification of Riemann–Liouville integral, which is why the fractional derivative is known as Caputo, Djrbashian-Caputo or Caputo-Djrbashian derivative.

== Education and career ==
Nersessian matriculated at Yerevan State University (YSU) in 1952 and graduated in 1957. From 1958 to 1961 he was a post graduate student of the Institute of Mathematics of National Academy of Sciences of Armenia. In 1961 he received his Ph.D. (Russian candidate degree) from the Steklov Institute of Mathematics with the thesis Expanding of Eigenfunctions of Some Problems for Differential Equations with Retarded Argument. In 1976 he received his doctoral degree (Russian doctorate beyond the Ph.D.) with the thesis Cauchy Problem for Weakly Hyperbolic Equations from the Institute of Mathematics at the Ukrainian Academy of Sciences. He was head of the department of higher mathematics and mathematical physics of Yerevan State University from 1970 to 1979. Since 1979, he has been the head of the Department of Differential and Integral Equations at the Institute of Mathematics.

Nersessian supervised 30 Ph.D. theses on differential equations, functional analysis and numerical analysis.

== Selected works ==
- Džrbašjan, M. M.; Nersesjan, A. B. Fractional derivatives and the Cauchy problem for differential equations of fractional order. (Russian) Izv. Akad. Nauk Armjan. SSR Ser. Mat. 3 1968 no. 1, 3–29.
- Nersesjan, A. B. On the Cauchy problem for degenerated hyperbolic equations of second order. (Russian) Dokl. Akad. Nauk SSSR 166 1966 1288–1291.
