= Dietrich Stoyan =

Dietrich Stoyan

Dietrich Stoyan (born November 26, 1940, Berlin) is a German mathematician and statistician who made contributions to queueing theory, stochastic geometry, and spatial statistics.

== Education and career ==
Stoyan studied mathematics at Technical University Dresden; applied research at Deutsches Brennstoffinstitut Freiberg, 1967 PhD, 1975 Habilitation. Since 1976 at TU Bergakademie Freiberg, Rektor of that university in 1991—1997. His statistical research of the diffusion of euro coins in Germany and Europe after the introduction of the euro in 2002 drew public attention. In 2024, he criticized together with Sung Nok Chiu the statistical data analysis methods employed in a paper by a team of researchers led by Michael Worobey that had concluded that the origin of the COVID-19 pandemic was a market in Wuhan. Worobey stated that he was working on a response.

Stoyan is an honorary doctor of the Technical University of Dresden (2000) and the University of Jyväskylä (2004). He was a member of the German Academy of Sciences at Berlin (1990), which disappeared in 1991. At present he is a member of the Academia Europaea (since 1992), the Berlin-Brandenburg Academy of Sciences (since 2000) and the German Academy of Sciences Leopoldina (since 2002). He is also a Fellow of the Institute of Mathematical Statistics (since 1997).

Stoyan is an observant nature lover: The local daily newspaper has reported twice on his discoveries of plants on the Red List in the Freiberg region. In October 2024, he photographed a scarce swallowtail butterfly in Freiberg.

== Research ==
=== Queueing Theory ===
Qualitative theory, in particular inequalities, for queueing systems and related stochastic models. The books Comparison Methods for Queues and other Stochastic Models (1983) and Comparison Methods for Stochastic Models and Risks (2002) report on the results. The work goes back to 1969 when he discovered the monotonicity of the GI/G/1 waiting times with respect to the convex order.

=== Stochastic Geometry ===
Stereological formulae, applications for marked point processes, development of stochastic models. Successful joint work with Joseph Mecke led to the first exact proof of the fundamental stereological formulae.

A book entitled Stochastic Geometry and its Applications (2013) reports on these results. Its 3rd edition is the key reference for applied stochastic geometry.

=== Spatial Statistics ===
Statistical methods for point processes, random sets and many other random geometrical structures such as fibre processes. Results can be found in the 2013 book on stochastic geometry and in the book, Fractals, Random Shapes and Point Fields (1994).

Stoyan is very active in demonstrating non-mathematicians and non-statisticians the potential of statistical and stochastic geometrical methods. He published many papers in journals of physics, materials science, forestry, and geology. One topic of particular interest was random packings of hard spheres. He co-organized together with Klaus Mecke conferences where physicists, geometers and statisticians met. See the books Statistical Physics and Spatial Statistics (2000) and Morphology of Condensed Matter (2002).

== Books ==
=== Authored ===
- Stoyan, D. (2020). Leute, ich regele das!: Harald Kohlstock – ein Leben für seine Universität (in German). Halle: Mitteldeutscher Verlag. ISBN 978-3-96311-462-5.
- Stoyan, D. (2018). In two Times: A former East German Scientist Tells his Story of Life in two Germanies. Translated by Gamble, James H. CreateSpace Independent Publishing Platform. ISBN 9781722096793.
- Chiu, S.N.; Stoyan, D.; Kendall, W.S.; Mecke, J. (2013). Stochastic Geometry and its Applications (3rd ed.). Chichester: Wiley. ISBN 978-0-470-66481-0.
- Illian, J.; Penttinen, A. K.; Stoyan, H.; Stoyan, D. (2008). Statistical Analysis and Modelling of Spatial Point Patterns. Chichester: Wiley. ISBN 978-0-470-01491-2.
- Müller, A.; Stoyan, D. (2002). Comparison Methods for Stochastic Models and Risks. Chichester: Wiley. ISBN 978-0-471-49446-1.
- Stoyan, D.; Stoyan, H.; Jansen, U. (1997). Umweltstatistik: Statistische Verarbeitung und Analyse von Umweltdaten (in German). Stuttgart, Leipzig: Vieweg+Teubner Verlag. ISBN 978-3815435267.
- Stoyan, D.; Stoyan, H. (1994). Fractals, Random Shapes, and Point Fields. Chichester: Wiley. ISBN 978-0471937579.
- Stoyan, D. (2007) [First published 1993]. Stochastik für Ingenieure und Naturwissenschaftler: eine Einführung in die Wahrscheinlichkeitstheorie und die mathematische Statistik (in German). TU Bergakademie Freiberg. ISBN 978-3-86012-322-5.
- Ambartzumjan, R.; Mecke, J.; Stoyan, D. (1992). Geometrische Wahrscheinlichkeiten und Stochastische Geometrie (in German). Weinheim: Wiley-VCH. ISBN 978-3055014499.
- Stoyan, D.; Stoyan, H. (1992). Fraktale – Formen – Punktfelder (in German). Weinheim: Wiley-VCH. ISBN 978-3055014284.
- Stoyan, D. (1983). Comparison Methods for Queues and Other Stochastic Models. Chichester: Wiley. ISBN 978-0471101222.
- Stoyan, D.; Mecke, J. (2022) [First published 1983]. Stochastische Geometrie (in German). Berlin: De Gruyter. ISBN 978-3-11-256824-8.
- Stoyan, D. (2022) [First published 1977]. Qualitative Eigenschaften und Abschätzungen stochastischer Modelle (in German). Berlin: De Gruyter. ISBN 978-3-11-256376-2.
- König, D.; Stoyan, D. (2022) [First published 1976]. Methoden der Bedienungstheorie (in German). Berlin: De Gruyter. ISBN 978-3-11-262173-8.
- Stoyan, D.; Stoyan, H. (1971). Mathematische Methoden in der Operationsforschung: Fördertechnik, Bergbau, Transportwesen (in German). Leipzig: Deutscher Verlag für Grundstoffindustrie.

=== Edited ===
- Stoyan, D., ed. (2015). Bergakademische Geschichten. Aus der Historie der Bergakademie Freiberg erzählt anlässlich des 250. Jahrestages ihrer Gründung (in German). Halle: Mitteldeutscher Verlag. ISBN 978-3-95462-410-2.
- Baddeley, A.; Gregori, P.; Mateu, J.; Stoica, R.; Stoyan, D., eds. (2005). Case Studies in Spatial Point Process Modeling. Lecture Notes in Statistics. Vol. 185. Springer. ISBN 978-0387283111.
- Mecke, Klaus R.; Stoyan, D., eds. (2002). Morphology of Condensed Matter. Lecture Notes in Physics. Vol. 600. Springer. ISBN 978-3-540-44203-5.
- Mecke, Klaus R.; Stoyan, D., eds. (2000). Statistical Physics and Spatial Statistics. Lecture Notes in Physics. Vol. 554. Berlin, Heidelberg: Springer. ISBN 3-540-67750-X.

== Videos ==
- Point processes in particle geometry statistics. In: Cassyni. Granular Matter Webinar Series 2026 (Link)
