= Mergelyan's theorem =

Theorem in complex analysis

Mergelyan's theorem is a result from approximation by polynomials in complex analysis proved by the Armenian mathematician Sergei Mergelyan in 1951.

== Statement ==
Let $K$ be a compact subset of the complex plane $\mathbb C$ such that $\mathbb C \setminus K$ is connected. Then, every continuous function $f : K\to \mathbb C$, such that the restriction $f$ to $\text{int}(K)$ is holomorphic, can be approximated uniformly on $K$ with polynomials. Here, $\text{int}(K)$ denotes the interior of $K$.

Mergelyan's theorem also holds for open Riemann surfaces. Let $\mathcal{A} (K)$ be set of all continuous and complex-valued functions in $\text{int}(K)$, and $\mathcal{O}(X)$ be the set of all functions that are holomorphic in a neighborhood of $K$. Then:

If $K$ is a compact set without holes in an open Riemann surface $X$, then every function in $\mathcal{A} (K)$ can be approximated uniformly on $K$ by functions in $\mathcal{O}(X)$.

Mergelyan's theorem does not always hold in higher dimensions (spaces of several complex variables), but it has some consequences.

== History ==
Mergelyan's theorem is a generalization of the Weierstrass approximation theorem and Runge's theorem.

In the case that $\mathbb C\setminus K$ is not connected, in the initial approximation problem the polynomials have to be replaced by rational functions. An important step of the solution of this further rational approximation problem was also suggested by Mergelyan in 1952. Further deep results on rational approximation are due to, in particular, A. G. Vitushkin.

Weierstrass and Runge's theorems were put forward in 1885, while Mergelyan's theorem dates from 1951. After Weierstrass and Runge, many mathematicians (in particular Walsh, Keldysh, Lavrentyev, Hartogs, and Rosenthal) had been working on the same problem. The method of the proof suggested by Mergelyan is constructive, and remains the only known constructive proof of the result.

== See also ==
- Arakelyan's theorem
- Hartogs–Rosenthal theorem
- Oka–Weil theorem
