= Georg Hamel =

German mathematician (1877 - 1954)

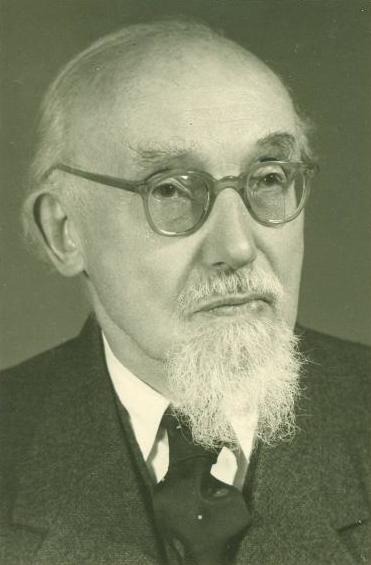
- circa 1950. TU Berlin
- Born: 12 September 1877; Düren, Rhineland, German Empire
- Died: 4 October 1954 (aged 77); Landshut, Bavaria, West Germany
- Education: University of Göttingen; Karlsruhe Institute of Technology
- Known for: Jeffery–Hamel flow Hamel basis
- Scientific career
- Workplaces: Technische Universität Berlin
- Thesis: On the geometries in which the degrees are the shortest (1901)
- Doctoral advisor: David Hilbert
- Doctoral students: Michael Sadowsky; Wilhelm Cauer; Richard von Mises

Georg Karl Wilhelm Hamel (12 September 1877 – 4 October 1954) was a German mathematician with interests in mechanics, the foundations of mathematics and function theory.

== Biography ==
Hamel was born in Düren, Rhenish Prussia. He studied at Aachen, Berlin, Göttingen, and Karlsruhe. His doctoral adviser was David Hilbert. He taught at Brünn in 1905, Aachen in 1912, and at Technische Universität Berlin in 1919. In 1927, Hamel studied the size of the key space for the Kryha encryption device. He was an Invited Speaker of the International Congress of Mathematicians in 1932 at Zurich and in 1936 at Oslo. He was the author of several important treatises on mechanics. He became a member of the Prussian Academy of Sciences in 1938 and the Bavarian Academy of Sciences in 1953. He died in Landshut, Bavaria.

== Selected publications ==
- Über die Geometrieen, in denen die Geraden die Kürzesten sind, Göttigen: Dieterich'schen Universitäts-Buch-Druckerei, 1901 ("On the geometries in which the straight lines are the shortest", Hamel's doctoral dissertation on Hilbert's fourth problem. A version may be found in Mathematische Annalen 57, 1903.)
- Lagrange-Euler'schen gleichungen der Mechanik, Leipzig: B.G. Teubner, 1903
- Hamel, Georg (1905), "Eine Basis aller Zahlen und die unstetigen Lösungen der Funktionalgleichung f(x+y)=f(x)+f(y)", Mathematische Annalen, 60 (3), Leipzig: 459–462, doi:10.1007/BF01457624, S2CID 120063569
- Elementare mechanik, Leipzig und Berlin: B. G. Teubner, 1912
- Grundbegriffe der Mechanik, Aus Natur und Geisteswelt,684. BDCHN., Leipzig, 1921
- Integralgleichungen, Berlin: Springer, 1937
- Komplexe Form der ebenen Bewegungsgleichungen zäher, inkompressibler Flüssigkeiten, Berlin: Verlag der Akademie der Wissenschaften, in Kommission bei W. de Gruyter, 1941
- Aufbau einer Theorie der Häute und der dünnen Schalen nach der Methode von Lagrange, Berlin: Akademie der Wissenschaften, in Kommission bei W. de Gruyter, 1944
- Theoretische Mechanik, Berlin: Springer, 1949

== See also ==
- Hamel basis
- Hamel dimension
- Cauchy's functional equation
- Hilbert's fourth problem
