= Aleksei Pogorelov =

Soviet and Russian mathematician

- Алексей Васильевич Погорелов
- Born: 3 March 1919; Korocha, Kursk Governorate, Russian Empire
- Died: 17 December 2002 (aged 83); Moscow, Russia
- Education: Kharkiv University
- Known for: Pogorelov's uniqueness theorem Pogolerov's theorem Alexandrov–Pogorelov theorem
- Awards: Stalin Prize (1950); Lobachevsky Prize (1959); Lenin Prize (1962)
- Scientific career
- Fields: Mathematics
- Workplaces: Kharkiv University; Verkin Institute for Low Temperature Physics and Engineering; Steklov Institute of Mathematics
- Academic advisors: Nikolai Yefimov; Aleksandr Aleksandrov

Aleksei Vasilyevich Pogorelov (Russian: Алексе́й Васи́льевич Погоре́лов, Ukrainian: Олексі́й Васи́льович Погорє́лов; 3 March 1919 – 17 December 2002), was a Soviet mathematician. Specialist in the field of convex and differential geometry, geometric PDEs and elastic shells theory, the author of novel school textbooks on geometry and university textbooks on analytical geometry, on differential geometry, and on the foundations of geometry.

Pogorelov's uniqueness theorem and the Alexandrov–Pogorelov theorem are named after him.

== Biography ==
He was born in Korocha in a peasant family. In 1931, because of the collectivization, the parents of Pogorelov escaped from the village to Kharkiv, where his father become a worker at the construction of the Kharkiv tractor plant. In 1935, Pogorelov won the first prize at the Mathematical Olympiad in Kharkiv State University. After high school graduation in 1937, he entered the mathematical department of the Kharkiv State University. He was the best student at the department.

In 1941, after the involvement of the Soviet Union in the World War II, Pogorelov was sent for 11 months study to N.Y. Zhukovsky Air Force Engineering Academy. During his studies, the students periodically were sent for several months to the front as technicians for the airplane service. After the Red Army Victory over Nazi near Moscow, the training continued for a full term. After academy graduation, he worked at N.Y. Zhukovsky Central Aero-hydrodynamic Institute (TsAGI) as a design engineer.

The desire to complete university education and specialize in geometry professionally led Pogorelov to Moscow State University. By recommendation of I.G. Petrovsky (Dean of the Mechanics and Mathematics Department) and a well-known geometer V.F. Kagan, Pogorelov met A.D. Aleksandrov – the founder of the theory of non-smooth convex surfaces. There were many new questions concerning this theory. Aleksandrov proposed to give an answer to one of them to Pogorelov. In a year the problem was solved and Pogorelov was enrolled to the graduate school of the Mechanics and Mathematics Department of Moscow State University. Nikolai Yefimov became his scientific advisor on topics of Aleksandrov theory. After defending his Ph.D. thesis in 1947, he was demobilized and moved to Kharkiv, where he started to work at the Institute of Mathematics of Kharkov State University and the Geometry Department of the university. In 1948 he defended his doctoral thesis. In 1951 he became the Corresponding Member of the Academy of Sciences of Ukraine, in 1960 he became the Corresponding member of the USSR Academy of Sciences (Division of Physical and Mathematical Sciences). In 1961 he became an Academician of the Academy of Sciences of Ukraine. In 1976, he became an Academician of the USSR Academy of Sciences (Mathematics Division). From 1950 to 1960 he was the Head of the Geometry Department at Kharkiv State University. From 1960 to 2000 he was the Head of the Geometry Division at the Verkin Institute for Low Temperature Physics and Engineering of the National Academy of Sciences of Ukraine.

Since 2000 he lived in Moscow and worked at the Steklov Institute of Mathematics.

He died on December 17, 2002, and was buried in Moscow at the Nikolo-Arkhangelsk cemetery.

== Scientific interests ==
By the beginning of the 20th century, the methods for solving of local problems related to regular surfaces were developed. By the thirties, there were developed the methods for solving the problems in geometry "in the large". These methods were related mainly to the theory of partial differential equations. Mathematicians were helpless when surfaces were non-smooth (for example, with conical points, ribbed points, etc.) and when the intrinsic geometry was given not by a smooth positive definite quadratic form, but simply by a metric space of a fairly general form. A breakthrough in the study of non-smooth metrics and non-smooth surfaces was made by an outstanding geometer A.D. Aleksandrov. He developed the theory of metric spaces of non-negative curvature, so-called Aleksandrov metric spaces. As a special case, the theory covered the intrinsic geometry of general convex surfaces, that is boundaries of convex bodies. Aleksandrov studied connections between the intrinsic and extrinsic geometries of general convex surfaces. He proved that every metric of non-negative curvature given on a two-dimensional sphere (including non-smooth metrics, so-called inner metrics) can be isometrically immersed into the three-dimensional Euclidean space in a form of a closed convex surface, but the answers to the following fundamental questions were unknown:

1. is this immersion unique up to rigid motion?
2. if the metric given on the sphere is a regular one and of positive Gaussian curvature, is it true then that the surface with this metric is regular?
3. G. Minkowski proved an existence theorem for a closed convex surface with the Gaussian curvature given as a function of a unit normal under some natural condition on this function; the open question was: if the function is regular on a sphere, is the surface regular itself?

After solving these problems, the theory created by Aleksandrov would have received “full citizenship” in mathematics and could be applied also in the classical regular case. Each of these 3 questions was answered positively by Pogorelov. Using synthetic geometric methods, he developed geometric methods to obtain priori estimates for solutions of Monge–Ampère equations. On the one hand, he used these equations to solve geometric problems; on the other hand, based on geometric reasons, he constructed a generalized solution of a Monge-Ampère equation and then proved its regularity for a regular right-hand side of the equation. In fact, in these pioneering works Pogorelov laid the foundation of the field of geometric analysis. He proved the following fundamental results:

1. Let F_{1} and F_{2} be two closed convex isometric surfaces in the three-dimensional Euclidean space or in a spherical space. Then the surfaces coincide up to the rigid motion.
2. A closed convex surface in a space of constant curvature is rigid outside flat domains on it. This means that the surface admits only trivial infinitesimal bendings.
3. If the metric of a convex surface is regular of regularity С^{к}, k≥2, in a space of constant curvature К* and the Gaussian curvature of the surface satisfies К>К*, then the surface is С^{к-1,α}.

For domains on convex surfaces assertions 1) and 2) are false. The local and global properties of surfaces are significantly different. By proving assertion 1) Pogorelov completed the solution of the problem open for more than a century. The first result in this direction was obtained by Cauchy for closed convex polyhedra in 1813.

The theorems proved by Pogorelov formed the basis for his nonlinear theory of thin shells. This theory is concerned with those elastic states of the shell which differ significantly comparing to the original form. Under such deformations, the middle surface of a thin shell undergoes bending with preservation of the metric. This makes it possible, by using theorems proved by Pogorelov for convex surfaces, to investigate loss of stability and the over critical elastic state of convex shells under a given strain. Such shells are the most common elements of modern designs.

Results 1) and 2) were generalized for regular surfaces in a Riemannian space. In addition, the Weyl problem for Riemannian space was solved: it was proved that a regular metric of Gaussian curvature greater than some constant c on a two-dimensional sphere can be isometrically immersed into a complete three-dimensional Riemannian space of curvature <c in a form of a regular surface. Studying the methods developed in the proof of this result, the Abel Prize laureate M. Gromov introduced the concept of pseudoholomorphic curves, which are the main tool in modern symplectic geometry.

A closed convex hypersurface is uniquely defined not only by the metric but also by the Gaussian curvature as a function of unit normals. Moreover, the hypersurface is uniquely determined up to a parallel transport. This was proved by G. Minkowski. But is the hypersurface regular under the condition that the Gaussian curvature K(n) is a regular function of a unit normal? Pogorelov proved that if positive function K(n) belongs to the class С^{k}, k≥3, then the support function will be of regularity class С^{k+1,v}, 0<v<1.

The hardest part of the proof of the theorem was to obtain a priori estimates for the derivatives of the support function of a hypersurface up to third order inclusively. Pogorelov's method of a priori estimates was used by S.-T. Yau to obtain a priori estimates for solutions of complex Monge-Ampere equations. This was the main step in the proof of the existence of Calabi-Yau manifolds, which play an important role in theoretical physics. A Monge-Ampère equation has the form

$$\det (z_{ij})=f(x_1, \dots, x_n, z, z_1, \dots, z_n).$$

A priori estimates in the Minkowski problem are a priori for the solution of the Monge-Ampère equation with the function

$$f=\frac 1{K(1+x_1^2+\cdots+x_n^2)^{\frac n2+1}}.$$

At that time there was no approach to studying this completely nonlinear equation. A. V. Pogorelov has created the theory of the Monge-Ampère equation by using the geometric methods. First, going from polyhedra, he proved the existence of generalized solutions under natural conditions on the right-hand side. After that he has found the a priori estimates for the derivatives up to the third order inclusively for the regular solutions. Using the a priori estimates, he has proved the regularity of strictly convex solutions, the existence of solutions of the Dirichlet problem and their regularity. The Monge-Ampère equation is an essential component of the Monge-Kantorovich transport problem; it is used in conformal, affine, Kähler geometries, in meteorology and in financial mathematics. Pogorelov once said about the Monge–Ampère equation: this is a great equation with which I had the honor to work.

One of the most conceptual works of Pogorelov refers to the cycle of works about smooth surfaces of bounded external curvature. A.D. Aleksandrov created a theory of general metric manifolds that naturally generalize Riemannian manifolds. In particular, he introduced the class of two-dimensional manifolds of bounded curvature. They exhaust the class of all metrized two-dimensional manifolds that admit, in a neighborhood of each point, a uniform approximation by Riemannian metrics with absolute integral curvature (i.e., the integral of the module of Gaussian curvature) bounded in aggregate.

Naturally, the question arose about the class of surfaces in three-dimensional Euclidean space carrying such a metric with preservation of connections between the metric and the extrinsic geometry of the surface. Partially answering this question, Pogorelov introduced the class of С^{1}-smooth surfaces with the requirement on the area of a spherical image to be bounded, taking into account the multiplicity of the covering in some neighborhood of each point of the surface. Such surfaces are called surfaces of bounded extrinsic curvature.

For such surfaces there is also a very close connection between the intrinsic geometry of the surface and its extrinsic shape: a complete surface with a bounded extrinsic curvature and a nonnegative intrinsic curvature (not equal to zero) is either a closed convex surface or an unbounded convex surface; a complete surface with zero intrinsic curvature and bounded extrinsic curvature is a cylinder.

The first work of A. V. Pogorelov on surfaces of bounded extrinsic curvature was published in 1953. In 1954, J. Nash published the paper on С^{1}-isometric immersions, which was improved by N. Kuiper in 1955. It follows from these studies that a Riemannian metric defined on a two-dimensional manifold, under very general assumptions, admits a realization on a С^{1}-smooth surface in a three-dimensional Euclidean space. Moreover, this realization is carried out as freely as a topological immersion into the space of the manifold on which the metric is given. Hence it is clear that for С^{1}-surfaces, even with a good intrinsic metric, it is impossible to preserve the connections between the intrinsic and extrinsic curvatures. Even in case if a С^{1}-surface carries a regular metric of positive Gaussian curvature, then this does not imply the local convexity of the surface. This emphasizes the naturalness of the class of surfaces of bounded external curvature introduced by Pogorelov.

Pogorelov solved Hilbert's fourth problem, set by D. Hilbert at the II International Congress of Mathematicians in Paris in 1900. He found all, up to isomorphism, realizations of the systems of axioms of classical geometries (Euclid, Lobachevsky and elliptic) if one omits the congruence axioms containing the concept of angle and supplement these systems with the axiom of "triangle inequality".

Pogorelov was one of the first who has proposed (in 1970) a new idea in the construction of a cryoturbogenerator with superconducting field winding and took an active part in technical calculations and creation of corresponding industrial samples.

== Honors ==
In 2015, one of the streets in Kharkiv was named after Pogorelov.

In 2007, National Academy of Sciences of Ukraine founded the Pogorelov Award for the achievements in the field of geometry and topology.

One of the asteroids is named after Pogorelov: (19919) Pogorelov.

=== Awards ===
- The Stalin Prize of the Second Level (1950) for works on the theory of convex surfaces, presented in the paper "Uniquely Definition of Convex Surfaces" and in a series of papers published in "Proceedings of the USSR Academy of Sciences" (1948-1949)
- Lenin Prize (1962) – for the results in geometry "in the large"
- Lobachevsky Prize (1959) - for the paper "Some questions of geometry in the large in Riemannian space"
- The Krylov Prize of the Academy of Sciences of the Ukrainian SSR (1973)
- The State Prize of the Ukrainian SSR (1974)
- N. N. Bogolubov Prize of the NAS of Ukraine (1998)
- The State Prize of Ukraine (2005)
- Two Orders of Lenin
- Order of the Red Banner of Labour
- Order of the Patriotic War, 2nd class (06.04.1985)

== Selected publications ==
- Topics in the theory of surfaces in elliptic spaces. Gordon & Breach. 1961.
- Extrinsic geometry of convex surfaces. AMS. 1973.
- The Minkowski multidimensional problem. V. H. Winston. 1978.
- Hilbert's fourth problem. V. H. Winston. 1979.
- Bending of surfaces and stability of shells. AMS. 1988.
- Busemann regular G-spaces. Harwood. 1999.
- Geometry [translated from the Russian by Leonid Levant, Aleksandr Repyev and Oleg Efimov.]. Moscow: Mir Publishers (1987). ISBN 0714725536. ISBN 978-0714725536.

== See also ==
- Cauchy's theorem
