= Alexander von Kryha =

Russian-German inventor and businessman

- von Kryha as a young man
- Born: 31 October 1891; Charkow, Russian Empire.
- Died: 26 May 1955 (aged 63); Committed suicide in Baden-Baden, Germany
- Citizenship: German
- Parents: Hans von Irega (father); Maria Reznikova (mother)
- Scientific career
- Fields: Cryptology

Alexander von Kryha (31 October 1891 in Charkow, 26 May 1955 in Baden-Baden) was a Russian-German cryptologist, inventor, and businessman. One of his most famous inventions is the Kryha cipher machine—named after him—which, in the 1920s, competed with the Enigma rotor cipher machine. It was a polyalphabetic cipher with a fixed periodic key length of 442. It was considered crytographically very weak.

== Life ==
Alexander von Kryha was born on 31 October 1891, in the Ukrainian city of Charkow, which was then part of the Russian Empire. During the World War I he served as a soldier in the Tsarist army, where he gained some experience of cryptography. Following the October Revolution and the communist seizure of power, he decided to emigrate to Germany around 1920, obtaining German citizenship shortly thereafter. He spent the period leading up to World War II living in Berlin. After the vulnerabilities of the ciphers used in the First World War became widely known in the 1920s for example the ADFGVX cipher and Zimmermann telegram, many inventors—including the American Edward Hugh Hebern, the German Arthur Scherbius, the Dutchman Hugo Alexander Koch, and the Swede Arvid Gerhard Damm—conceived the idea of replacing the manual encryption methods used during the war with superior, machine-based encryption techniques. Alexander von Kryha became one of this group as a founder of machine encryption methods.

== Cipher encryption machine ==
In 1924, after returning from a visit to the United States, Kryha began development of a cipher encryption machine, in the hope of a commercial success, to which he gave his name, the "Kryha standard". His idea was based on the use of a cipher disk—a device well-known at the time—consisting of two concentric circles inscribed with scrambled alphabets (where letters were arranged in an arbitrary order). One disk could be rotated relative to the other according to a specific key; letters on one circle served as substitutes for the letters aligned with them on the other. Kryha proposed a mechanism for the automatic, irregular rotation of the disk. A toothed wheel was divided into several sectors, each featuring a specific number of teeth. After each letter was encrypted, the wheel would advance by one sector, causing the cipher disk to rotate by a number of positions determined by the number of teeth in that sector. In a later model, the number of sectors was increased; each sector was equipped with a screw that allowed its corresponding stop position to be enabled or disabled, meaning the wheel could advance across multiple sectors in a single step. Furthermore, the total number of teeth was chosen to be coprime to the number of letters in the alphabet, ensuring that a full rotation of the wheel did not return the letter disk to its original starting position. Consequently, the device performed a polyalphabetic substitution with a very long cycle of alphabets. The cipher key consisted of the sequences of letters inscribed on the disks, the configuration of sectors with varying numbers of teeth, and their initial positions.

== Advertising ==
An advert for von Kryha's two machines in the 1929 edition of the Leipzig illustrated news magazine Illustrirte Zeitung

Beginning around 1926, Kryha began marketing his cyrptographic machines. He attended presentations at the Great Police Exhibition in Berlin in 1926, the International Press Exhibition 1928 in Cologne and the International Office Exhibition in Berlin in the same year. Despite numerous additional press releases and publications with which he tried to market his machines in a supportive manner, he was not a greater success. In July 1930, his company, Deutsche Kryha-Maschinengesellschaft mbH, went bankrupt.

== Machine security ==
However, the Kryha cipher was insecure. Because the sequence of alphabet shifts repeated regularly, methods were developed to break the cipher.

Despite the persistent promotion of his machines, Kryha did not achieve commercial success.
