= Separating set =

Property for sets of functions

In mathematics, a set $S$ of functions with domain $D$ is called a separating set for $D$ and is said to separate the points of $D$ (or just to separate points) if for any two distinct elements $x$ and $y$ of $D,$ there exists a function $f \in S$ such that $f(x) \neq f(y).$

Separating sets can be used to formulate a version of the Stone–Weierstrass theorem for real-valued functions on a compact Hausdorff space $X,$ with the topology of uniform convergence. It states that any subalgebra of this space of functions is dense if and only if it separates points. This is the version of the theorem originally proved by Marshall H. Stone.

== Examples ==
- The singleton set consisting of the identity function on $\Reals$ separates the points of $\Reals.$
- If $X$ is a T1 normal topological space, then Urysohn's lemma states that the set $C(X)$ of continuous functions on $X$ with real (or complex) values separates points on $X.$
- If $X$ is a locally convex Hausdorff topological vector space over $\Reals$ or $\Complex,$ then the Hahn–Banach separation theorem implies that continuous linear functionals on $X$ separate points.

== See also ==
- Dual system – Dual pair of vector spaces
