= Kryha =

Device for encryption and decryption

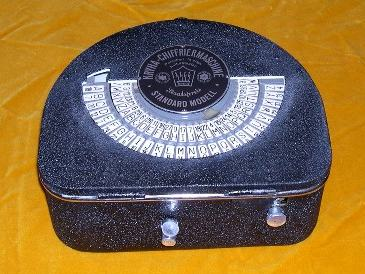
The standard Kryha machine weighed around five kilograms and was totally mechanical. While the machine achieved a measure of popularity, its security was relatively weak; US cryptanalyst William Friedman reported that he solved the device within 2 hours and 41 minutes.

In the history of cryptography, the Kryha machine was a device for encryption and decryption, appearing in the early 1920s and used until the 1950s. The machine was the invention of Alexander von Kryha (born 31.10.1891 in Charkow, Russian Empire, committed suicide in Baden-Baden in 1955). During the Second World War, Kryha worked as an officer for the German Wehrmacht. There were several versions; the standard Kryha machine weighed around five kilograms, and was totally mechanical. A scaled down pocket version was introduced later on, termed the "Lilliput" model. There was also a more bulky electrical version.

The machine was used for a time by the German Diplomatic Corps, and was adopted by Marconi in England.

== Operation ==
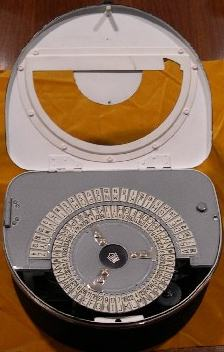
The inner ring stepped an irregular number of places with each lever press, changing the encryption in a complex manner.

The machine consisted of two concentric rings each containing an alphabet. The inner alphabet was stepped a variable number of places by pushing a lever. In operation, the user would encrypt by finding the plaintext letter on one ring (usually the outer ring), and reading the corresponding letter on the other ring; this was then used as the ciphertext letter. When the lever was pressed, the inner ring would step, causing the relationship between the two alphabets to change. The stepping was irregular and governed by the use of a disk with a number of sectors, each containing a number of teeth.

== Cryptanalysis ==
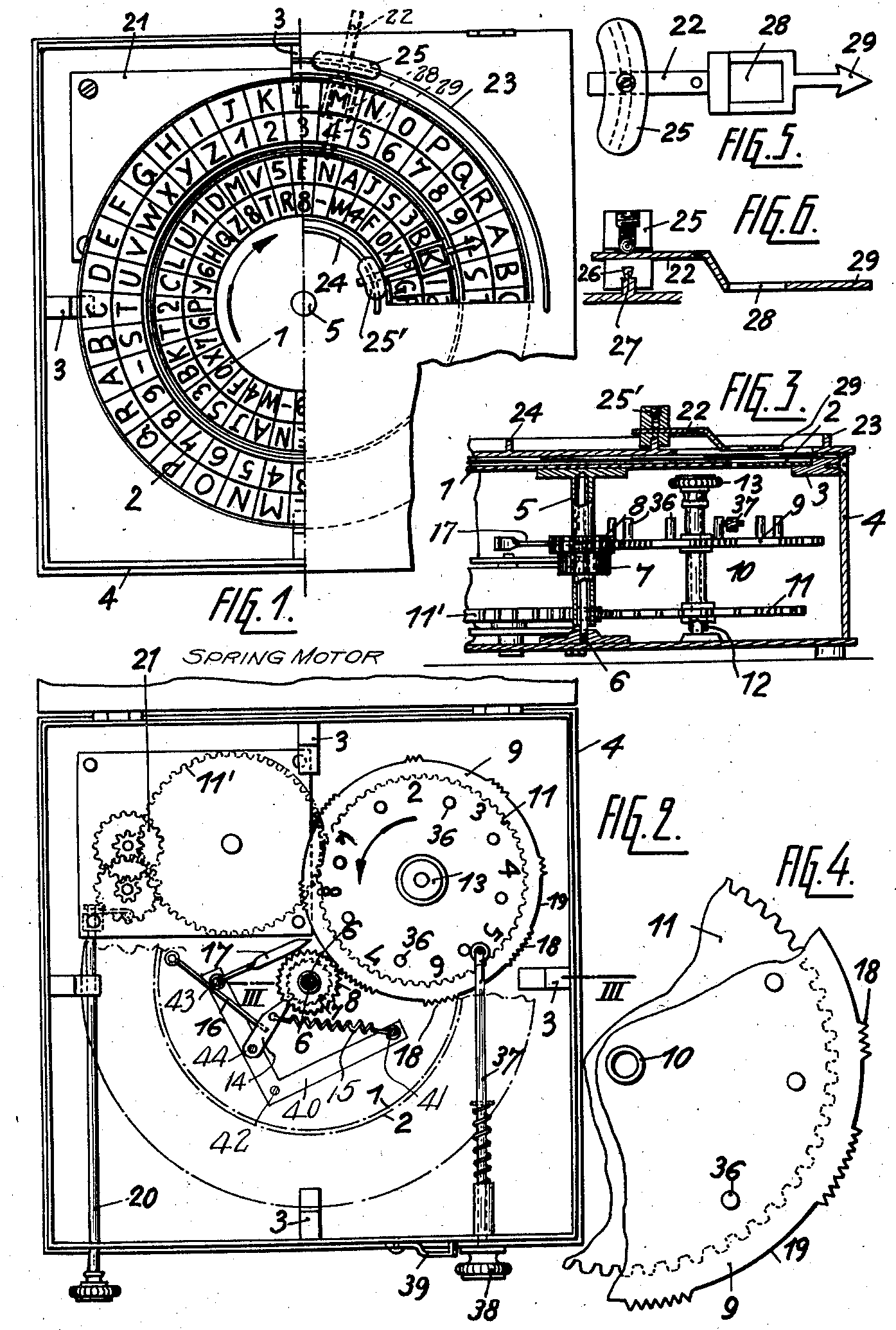
The Kryha machine was patented in the US in 1930; the design shows two concentric discs labelled with the alphabet.

The security of the machine was evaluated by the mathematician Georg Hamel, who calculated the size of the key space. The US Army was also contacted to see if they would be interested in using the machine, and were persuaded to accept a challenge message to evaluate the security of the device. The challenge message, 1135 characters long, was solved by William Friedman, assisted by Solomon Kullback, Frank Rowlett and Abraham Sinkov, in 2 hours and 41 minutes.
