= Artashes Shahinian =

Artashes L. Shahinian
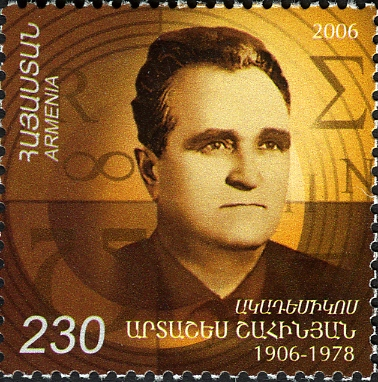
- Born: December 19, 1906; Alexandropol, Erivan Governorate, Caucasus Viceroyalty, Russian Empire
- Died: May 14, 1978 (aged 71)
- Education: Yerevan State University
- Awards: Emeritus scientist of ArmSSR; Order of Red Banner of Labour; Order of Friendship of Peoples
- Scientific career
- Fields: Mathematical analysis, Mathematical physics
- Workplaces: Armenian Academy of Sciences

Artashes Shahinian (Armenian: Արտաշես Շահինյան, December 19, 1906 – May 14, 1978) was a Soviet Armenian mathematician, Doctor of Sciences in Physics and Mathematics (1944), Professor (1944), and member of the Armenian Academy of Sciences (1947, (1947, correspondent member 1945). Honoured scientist of the ArmSSR (1961). He worked in complex analysis, authoring a number of research papers and research monographs in mathematics. Being a talented mentor and professor, Shahinian was a teacher and research supervisor for many young gifted mathematicians.

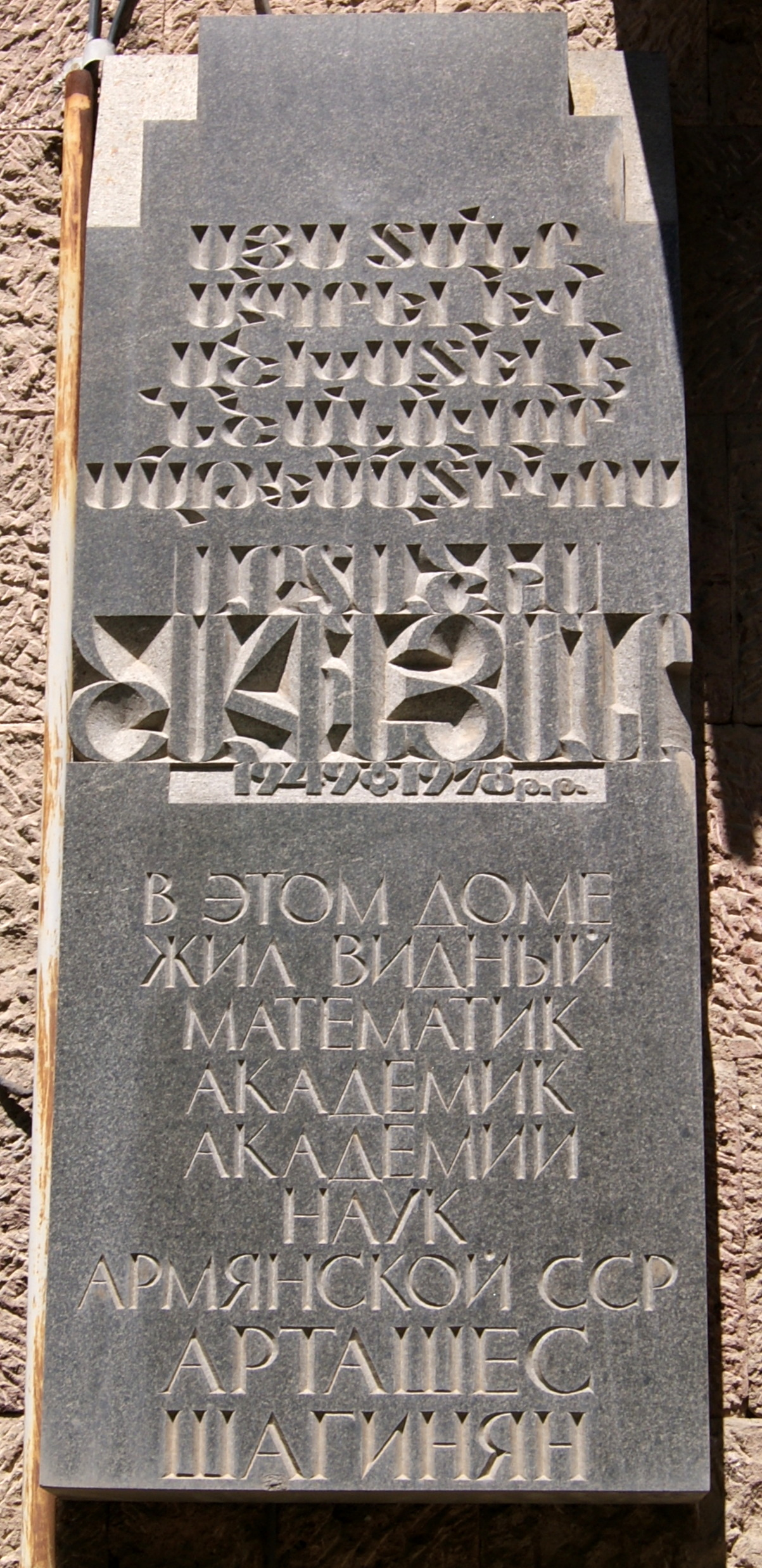
The commemorative plaque of Artashes Shahinyan on Baghramayan Avenue in Yerevan

He is the founder of the Armenian research mathematical school, which already in the 1940s and early 1950s was known internationally. Academician Shahinian was also known by his speeches and publications on many questions of public importance in Armenia. Some known Armenian poets, writers, and painters of the time have witnessed that Shahinyan had professional level knowledge in poetry, history, and arts. It is well known that he also shared that knowledge with his students. Among the first students of Academician Shahinian were Sergey Mergelyan, Mkhitar Djrbashian, Rafayel Alexandryan, Alexander Talalyan, and Norair Arakelian, who became famous mathematicians, academicians, and the next leaders of the Armenian mathematical school.

Shahinian held several positions, including Head of Chair of Yerevan State University (1944–1978), Dean (1939–1942), Head of the Mathematics and Mechanics Department of the Academy of Sciences of the Armenian SSR (1945–1955), Director of the Institute of Mathematics and Mechanics (1955–1959), Academy-secretary of the Department of Physics-Mathematical Sciences (1950–1963).

== Honors ==
- Order of Red Banner of Labour
- Order of Friendship of Peoples
- Deserved scientist of ArmSSR
- Medal "For Labour Valour"
