= Wilfrid Kendall =

Professor of Statistics of University of Warwick

Wilfrid S. Kendall
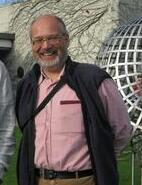
- Kendall at Oberwolfach, 2008
- Born: 5 November 1954 (age 71); Oxford, UK
- Education: University of Oxford
- Scientific career
- Fields: Mathematics
- Workplaces: University of Warwick

Wilfrid S. Kendall is professor of statistics at the University of Warwick. He earned a DPhil in probability theory from the University of Oxford in 1979, authored or edited 5 books, published around 100 scientific articles in theoretical and applied probability and has been the president of the Bernoulli Society for Mathematical Statistics and Probability (2013-2015). He is founding co-director of the UK Academy for PhD Training in Statistics (established in 2007), which each year provides training for around 90 first-year Statistics PhD students from the UK and Republic of Ireland.

Kendall is the son of fellow statistician, the late David George Kendall and the brother of television journalist Bridget Kendall.

== Books ==
- Sung Nok Chiu, Dietrich Stoyan, Wilfrid S. Kendall, Joseph Mecke (2013). Stochastic geometry and its applications. 3rd edition, Wiley.
