= Michael Sadowsky =

German mathematician

- Born: 1902
- Died: December 31, 1967 (aged 65)
- Education: Technische Universität Berlin
- Scientific career
- Fields: elasticity materials science
- Workplaces: Illinois Institute of Technology; Rensselaer Polytechnic Institute
- Doctoral advisor: Georg Hamel
- Doctoral students: Eli Sternberg

Michael A. Sadowsky (1902 – December 31, 1967) was a researcher in solid mechanics, particularly the mathematical theory of elasticity and materials science. Born in the Russian Empire, he earned his doctorate in 1927 under the applied mathematician Georg Hamel at Technische Hochschule Berlin-Charlottenburg with a dissertation entitled Spatially periodic solutions in the theory of elasticity (in German). He made contributions in the use of potential functions in elasticity and force transfer mechanisms in composites. Many of his early papers were written in German.

== Selected publications ==
- Sadowsky, Michael (April 1939). "Tetrahedral Riemann Surface Model of a Closed Finite Locally-Euclidean Two-Space". The American Mathematical Monthly. 46 (4): 199–202. doi:10.2307/2303065. JSTOR 2303065.
- Sadowsky, Michael (October 1940). "Formula for Approximate Computation of a Triple Integral". The American Mathematical Monthly. 47 (8): 539–543. doi:10.2307/2303834. JSTOR 2303834.
- "Equiareal Patterns The American Mathematical Monthly". The American Mathematical Monthly. 50 (1): 35–40. January 1943. doi:10.2307/2303990. JSTOR 2303990.
- with E. Sternberg: Sadowsky, M. A.; Sternberg, E. (1950). "Elliptic integral representation of axially symmetric flows". Quart. Appl. Math. 8 (2): 113–126. doi:10.1090/qam/37425. MR 0037425.
