= Eli Sternberg =

- Born: 13 November 1917; Vienna, Austria
- Died: 8 October 1988 (aged 70); Pasadena, California
- Scientific career
- Fields: elasticity
- Institutions: Illinois Institute of Technology; Brown University; Caltech
- Doctoral advisor: Michael Sadowsky
- Doctoral students: Morton Gurtin

Eli Sternberg (13 November 1917 – 8 October 1988) was a researcher in solid mechanics and was considered to be the "nation's leading elastician" at the time of his death. He earned his doctorate in 1945 under Michael Sadowsky at the Illinois Institute of Technology with a dissertation entitled Non-Linear Theory of Elasticity and Applications. He made contributions widely in elasticity, especially in mathematical analysis, the theory of stress concentrations, thermo-elasticity, and visco-elasticity.

He was in 1956 a Fulbright Fellow at the Delft Institute of Technology and for the academic year 1963–1964 a Guggenheim Fellow at the Keiō University in Tokyo. For the academic year 1970-1971 he was a visiting professor in Chile and in 1968 at the University of Glasgow.

Sternberg became in 1951 a full professor at the Illinois Institute of Technology, in 1957 a professor of applied mathematics at Brown University, and in 1964 a professor of mechanics at Caltech, where he retired as professor emeritus in 1988.

== Honors and awards ==
- National Academy of Engineering
- National Academy of Sciences
- Timoshenko Medal

== Selected publications ==
- with M. A. Sadowsky: "Stress concentration around an ellipsoidal cavity in an infinite body under arbitrary plane stress perpendicular of the axis of revolution of cavity". Journal of Applied Mechanics. 14: 191–201. 1947.
- with M. A. Sadowsky: Sadowsky, M. A.; Sternberg, E. (1949). "Stress concentration around a triaxial ellipsoidal cavity". Journal of Applied Mechanics. 16 (2): 149–157. Bibcode:1949JAM....16..149S. doi:10.1115/1.4009928.
- with M. A. Sadowsky: "Elliptic integral representation of axially symmetric flows". Quarterly of Applied Mathematics. 8 (2): 113–126. 1950. doi:10.1090/qam/37425. MR 0037425.
- with R. A. Eubanks: "On the method of inversion in the two-dimensional theory of elasticity". Quarterly of Applied Mathematics. 8 (4): 392–395. 1951. doi:10.1090/qam/39485. MR 0039485.
- with F. Rosenthal: Sternberg, E.; Rosenthal, F. (1952). "The elastic sphere under concentrated loads". Journal of Applied Mechanics. 19 (4): 413–421. Bibcode:1952JAM....19..413S. doi:10.1115/1.4010536.
- "On Saint-Venant´s principle". Quarterly of Applied Mathematics. 11 (4): 393–402. 1954. doi:10.1090/qam/58414. MR 0058414.
- with R. A. Eubanks: "On the Completeness of the Boussinesq-Papkovich Stress Functions". Journal of Rational Mechanics and Analysis. 5 (5): 735–746. 1956. JSTOR 24900202.
- with R. A. Eubanks: "On stress functions for elastokinetics and the integration of the repeated wave equation". Quarterly of Applied Mathematics. 15 (2): 149–153. 1957. doi:10.1090/qam/91657. MR 0091657.
- with E. L. McDowell: "On the steady-state thermoelastic problem for the half-space". Quarterly of Applied Mathematics. 14 (4): 381–398. 1957. doi:10.1090/qam/87367. MR 0087367.
- with J. G. Chakravorty: "Thermal shock in an elastic body with a spherical cavity". Quarterly of Applied Mathematics. 17 (2): 205–218. 1959. doi:10.1090/qam/107424. MR 0107424.
- "On some recent developments in the linear theory of elasticity". Structural Mechanics. Proceedings of the First Symposium Naval Structural Mechanics. Pergamon Press. 1960.
- "On the integration of the equations of motion in classical elasticity". Archive for Rational Mechanics and Analysis. 6: 34–50. 1960. doi:10.1007/BF00276152. S2CID 122667920.
- with M. E. Gurtin: "A note on uniqueness in classical elastodynamics". Quarterly of Applied Mathematics. 19 (2): 169–171. 1961. doi:10.1090/qam/129226. MR 0129226.
- with Rokurō Muki: "Note on an asymptotic property of solutions to a class of Fredholm integral equations". Quarterly of Applied Mathematics. 28 (2): 277–281. 1970. doi:10.1090/qam/264346. MR 0264346.
