= Jorge Mateu =

Spanish statistician (born 1969)

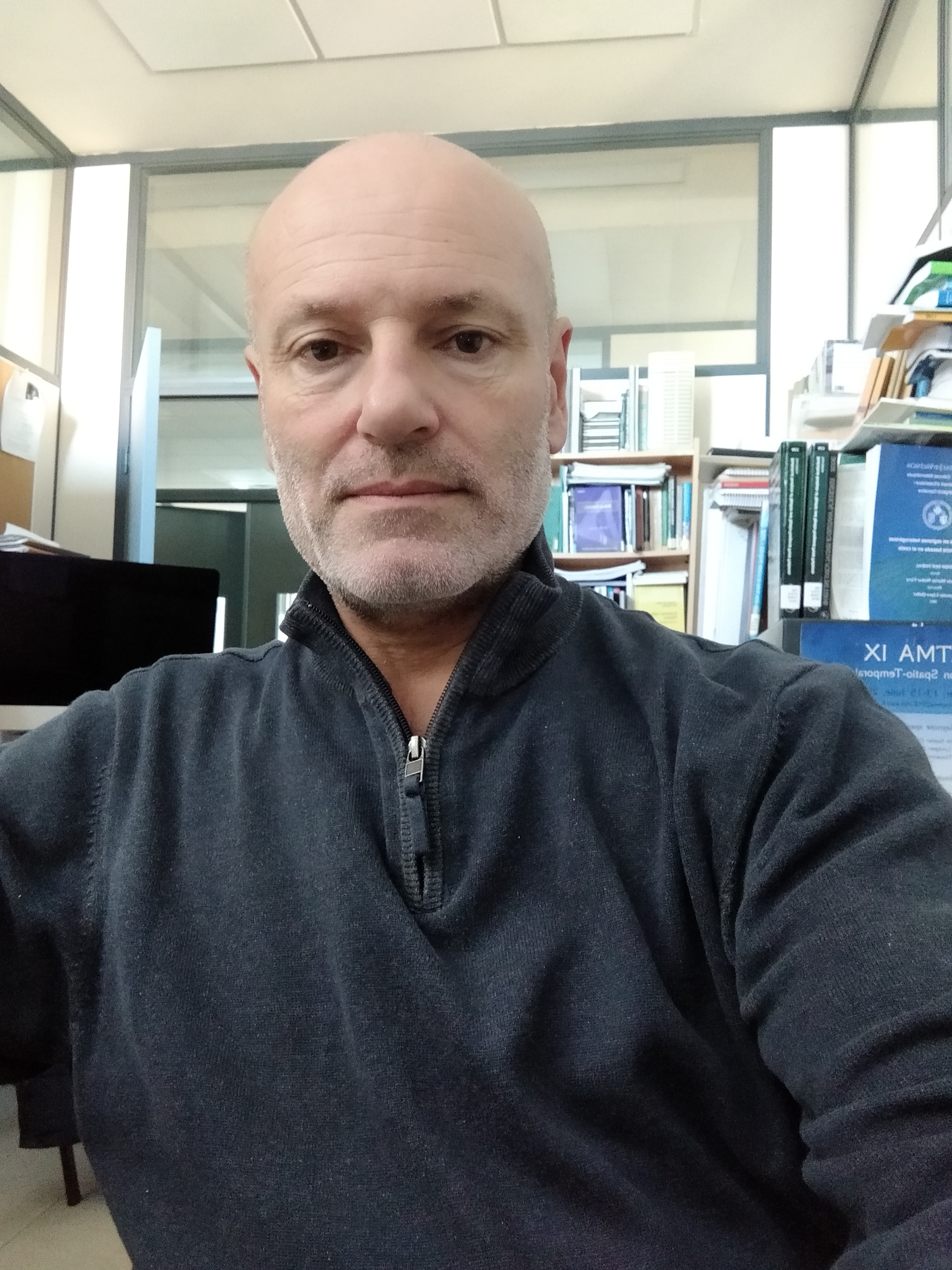
- Born: October 11, 1969 (age 57); Spain
- Occupations: Mathematician, author and academic
- Family: Nadia, Victor, Adrian and Nuria (sons and daughters)

Academic background
- Education: Undergraduate., Mathematics and Statistics; M.Sc. Mathematics; Ph.D. Mathematics
- Alma mater: University of Valencia
- Website: "Web site Jorge Mateu".

Jorge Mateu is a Spanish mathematician, author, and academic. He is a professor of statistics within the Department of Mathematics at University Jaume I of Castellon and director of the Unit Eurocop for Data Science in criminal activities in the same department.

Mateu's research is centered on data science, geostatistics, and stochastic processes, with a particular emphasis on spatio-temporal point processes. He led the 'Mathematical-statistical modelling of space-time data and data mining' group at Universitat Jaume I to develop spatio-temporal statistical techniques used for modelling across fields of public safety, environmental management, and criminology. He is co-editor of books, including Spatial Statistics Through Applications (2002), Case Studies in Spatial Point Process Modeling (2005), Spatio-temporal Design. Advances in Efficient Data Acquisition (2012), Spatial and Spatio-Temporal Geostatistical Modeling and Kriging (2015), or Geostatistical Functional Data Analysis (2021). He has also received the Social Council Award from UJI and has been noted as a World Class Professor by an Indonesian ministry.

Mateu is a Fellow of the Royal Statistical Society and Wessex Institute in Great Britain and a member of The International Statistical Institute and the Bernoulli Society for Mathematical Statistics and Probability. He served as a guest editor for special issues in the Journal of Geophysical Research, and Environmetrics, as the editor-in-chief for the Journal of Agricultural, Biological, and Environmental Statistics as well as an associate editor for Stochastic Environmental Research and Risk Assessment, Spatial Statistics, Environmetrics, and International Statistical Review.

== Education ==
Mateu earned his undergraduate degree in mathematics and statistics from the University of Valencia in 1987, followed by a master's degree in 1995. He graduated with a Ph.D. from the Department of Mathematics at University of Valencia (UV) in 1998.

== Career ==
Mateu began his academic career as an assistant professor of statistics in the Department of Mathematics at Jaume I University in 1992 where he served as an associate professor from 2000 to 2007. In 2007, he assumed the position of Full Professor of Statistics at UJI.

In 2011, he held the position of secretary for the International Environmetrics Society's board of directors and became a co-director of the Erasmus Mundus Master in Geospatial Technologies. Additionally, he served as President of the Board of Editors for METMA Workshops Since 2014, he has been serving as the director of the Unit Eurocop: Statistical Modeling of Crime Data at Jaume I University.

== Research ==
Mateu focuses his research on the intersection of geostatistics, spatial data, stochastic processes, computational sciences, and natural sciences, with a particular emphasis on data science. He has analysed crime data and public health projects by employing a combination of statistical and machine-learning methods. He served as a joint principal investigator for GEO-C. He was worked on the projects (a) Statistical analysis of complex dependencies in space-time stochastic processes. Networks, functional marks and SPDE-based intensities. Ministry of Science and bInnovation (PID2022-141555OB-I00), 2023-2026, and (b) Spatio-temporal stochastic processes over networks and trajectories. Parametric models and functional marks. Generalitat Valenciana (CIAICO/2022/191), 2023-2025.

=== Data science and stochastic processes ===
Mateu's research on data science has included a range of topics such as filament delineation, model selection, and stochastic processes. In his research on the automatic delineation of filaments obtained from redshift catalogs, he applied a marked point process, to gain insights into the cosmic filament structure. Together with a number of coauthors, he extended Gneiting's work to develop new spatio-temporal covariance models, resulting in novel classes of stationary nonseparable functions. In addition, his research of space-time covariance function estimation introduced two methods based on the concept of composite likelihood which were designed to strike a balance between computational complexity and statistical efficiency. Furthermore, while addressing the challenge of model selection, he discussed the limitations of traditional models like Bayesian Information Criterion and proposed a practical extension aimed at handling model selection issues effectively. In 2018, during his research on the use of administrative data, he identified challenges related to statistical analyses and discussed the need for a critical approach to ensure the validity and accuracy of results.

=== Spatial data and environmental management ===
Mateu has conducted studies on the spatial and spatio-temporal point processes. He conducted research to analyse spatial point patterns across different experimental groups, summarising his findings using the K-function in a non-parametric approach to emphasise the strengths and limitations of spatial data. His work on Functional Data Analysis demonstrated its connection with three traditional types of spatial data structures and provided examples to illustrate the integration of geostatistical data, and areal data. He also introduced a methodological framework based on geostatistics that applied to agricultural planning and environmental restoration. In collaboration with other colleagues, he analysed real-world soil penetration and presented an approach for predicting spatial patterns in functional data which enabled the estimation of values at unobserved locations.

=== Crime data and public health analysis ===
Mateu's research on functional environmental data, particularly in modelling air pollutant concentrations, emphasised the importance of cross-validation for parameter selection and provided insights into adapting kriging techniques. In 2003, he introduced a spatiotemporal Hawkes-type point process model for analysing violence by incorporating daily and weekly periodic patterns in crime occurrences to shed light on the interplay of temporal trends in crime. Expanding on this research, he introduced a deep learning approach in temporal correlations of historical data resulting in the enhancement of police resources, surveillance, crime event predictions, and prevention strategies.

== Awards and honors ==
- 2022 – Social Council Award, Jaume I University
- 2022 – Recognition of World Class Professor, Ministry of Education, Culture, Research, and Technology, Republic of Indonesia

== Bibliography ==
=== Books ===
- Spatial Statistics Through Applications (2002) ISBN 978-1853126499
- Geoestadística y Modelos Matemáticos en Hidrogeología (2003) ISBN 978-8480214179
- Spatial Point Process Modelling and its Applications. Proceedings of the International Conference on Spatial Point Process Modelling and its Applications (2004) ISBN 978-8480214759
- Case Studies in Spatial Point Process Modeling (2005) ISBN 978-0387283111
- New Advances in Space-Time Random Field Modelling (2008) ISBN 978-8480216500
- Statistics for Spatio-Temporal Modelling (2008) ISBN 978-8860250988
- Positive Definite Functions: from Schoenberg to Space-Time Challenges (2008) ISBN 978-8461282821
- Stochastic Processes for Spatial Econometrics (2009) ISBN 978-8497454124
- Spatio-temporal Design. Advances in Efficient Data Acquisition (2012) ISBN 978-0470974292
- Spatial and Spatio-Temporal Geostatistical Modeling and Kriging (2015) ISBN 978-1118413180
- Geostatistical Functional Data Analysis (2021) ISBN 978-1119387848

=== Selected articles ===
- Waagepetersen, R., Guan, Y., Jalilian, A., & Mateu, J. (2016). Analysis of multi-species point patterns using multivariate log Gaussian Cox processes. Journal of the Royal Statistical Society C, 65 (1), 77–96.
- Stoica, R. S., Philippe, A., Gregori, P., & Mateu, J. (2017). An ABC Shadow algorithm: a new tool for spatial patterns statistical analysis. Statistics and Computing, 27, 1225–1238.
- Eckardt, M., & Mateu, J. (2018). Point patterns occurring on complex structures in space and spacetime: An alternative network approach. Journal of Computational and Graphical Statistics, 27 (2), 312–322.
- Zhuang, J., & Mateu, J. (2019). A semi-parametric spatiotemporal Hawkes-type point process model with periodic background for crime data. Journal of the Royal Statistical Society A, 182 (3), 919–942.
- González, J. A., Hahn, U., & Mateu, J. (2020). Analysis of tornado reports through replicated spatio-temporal point patterns. Journal of the Royal Statistical Society C, 69 (1), 3-23.
- Müller, R., Schuhmacher, D., & Mateu, J. (2020). Metrics and barycenters for point pattern data. Statistics and Computing, 30 (4), 953–972.
- Eckardt, M., & Mateu, J. (2021). Second-order and local characteristics of network intensity functions. Test, 30, 318–340.
- Frías, M. P., Torres-Signes, A., Ruiz-Medina, M. D., & Mateu, J. (2022). Spatial Cox processes in an infinite-dimensional framework. Test, 31, 175–203.
