= Arthur Rosenthal =

German mathematician (1887–1959)

Zürich 1932

Arthur Rosenthal (24 February 1887, Fürth, Germany – 15 September 1959, Lafayette, Indiana) was a German mathematician.

== Career ==
Rosenthal's mathematical studies started in 1905 in Munich, under Ferdinand Lindemann and Arnold Sommerfeld at the Ludwig-Maximilians-Universität München (LMU Munich) and the Technical University of Munich (TUM), as well as at the University of Göttingen. After submitting his thesis on regular polyhedra in 1909, he was promoted to assistant at the TUM in 1911 and then associate professor at the LMU in 1920. The following year he was appointed associate professor at the Heidelberg University, with a promotion to full professor in 1930. Between 1932 and 1933, he served as dean in the faculty of mathematics and natural sciences, but was forced from his university position as a result of Nazi policies against German Jews. He moved to the Netherlands in 1936 and from there immigrated to the United States in 1939. He was appointed lecturer and research fellow at the University of Michigan in 1940 with a promotion to assistant professor in 1943. In 1946, he became associate professor at the University of New Mexico and the following year moved to the Purdue University as full professor, where he remained until his retirement in 1957. In 1954, he was formally reinstated at Heidelberg University. A scholarship at Purdue University is named in his honor. His doctoral students include Theodore Chihara.

== Research ==
Rosenthal's mathematical research was in geometry, in particular the classification of regular polyhedra and Hilbert's axioms. He also made contributions in analysis, including to Carathéodory's theory of measure. With the Swiss mathematician Michel Plancherel, he made contributions in ergodic theory and dynamical systems.

== See also ==
- Hartogs–Rosenthal theorem
