= Norair Arakelian =

Armenian and Soviet mathematician (1936–2023)

- Նորայր Հունանի Առաքելյան
- Born: 17 July 1936; Megrashen, Armenian SSR, Transcaucasian SFSR, USSR
- Died: December 2023 (aged 87)
- Education: Yerevan State University
- Known for: Arakelyan's theorem
- Scientific career
- Fields: Mathematics
- Workplaces: Yerevan State University
- Thesis: Uniform and tangential approximations by entire functions in the complex domain (1962)

Norair Hunani Arakelian, often cited as Arakelyan, (Armenian: Նորայր Հունանի Առաքելյան; 17 July 1936 – December 2023) was an Armenian and Soviet mathematician, specializing in approximation theory and complex analysis. He was known for Arakelian's approximation theorem. Also, on the basis of his approximation theory results, Arakelian disproved an old conjecture of Rolf Nevanlinna from the value distribution theory. This and his other results Arakelian presented at the International Congress of Mathematicians at Nice in 1970. He died in December 2023, at the age of 87.

== Education and career ==
Born in the village of Megrashen, Arakelian enrolled at Yerevan State University (YSU) in 1953 and graduated there in 1958. In 1962 he received his Ph.D. (Russian candidate degree) from YSU with the thesis Uniform and tangential approximations by entire functions in the complex domain. From 1959 to 1980 he was Docent of the Chair of Function Theory of YSU. In 1970 he received his doctorate of science (Russian doctorate beyond the Ph.D.) with the thesis Some questions of approximation theory and the theory of entire functions). At the Institute of Mathematics of the Academy of Sciences of the Armenian Soviet Socialist Republic (and later of the Republic of Armenia), he was from 1971 to 1978 a Senior Scientific Researcher and later Head of the Department of Approximation Theory from 1978 to 1991 and from 1997 to 2004. He was the Rector of YSU from 1991 to 1993 and Head of Chair of Function Theory of YSU from 1992 to 2000. After 2005 he was Head of the Department of Complex Analysis at the Institute of Mathematics of the National Academy Sciences of Armenia.

Arakelian supervised 10 Ph.D. theses on approximation theory and complex analysis. He was a visiting professor at the Université de Montréal and several western European universities. In 1970 he was an invited speaker at the International Congress of Mathematicians at Nice.

== Awards ==
- Mesrop Mashtots Medal (14 October 14, 2013) – in connection with the 70th anniversary of the NAS
- Honored Scientist of the Republic of Armenia (2003)
- Lenin Komsomol Prize (1970) – "for a series of studies on the theory of functions."

== Links ==
- Persons in Armenia (Russian)
