= Mkhitar Djrbashian =

Soviet mathematician (1918–1994)

- Born: 11 September 1918; Yerevan, First Republic of Armenia
- Died: 6 May 1994 (aged 75); Yerevan, Armenia
- Education: Yerevan State University
- Scientific career
- Fields: Mathematics
- Workplaces: National Academy of Sciences of Armenia, Yerevan State University
- Doctoral advisor: Artashes Shahinian

Mkhitar Djrbashian (also M. M. Dzhrbashjan, M. M. Jerbashian; Russian: Мхитар Мкртичевич Джрбашян; Armenian: Մխիթար Մկրտչի Ջրբաշյան[ 11 September 1918 – 6 May 1994) was a notable Armenian mathematician, who made significant contributions to the constructive theory of functions, harmonic analysis, theory of analytic functions and a fundamental contribution to the classical theory of univalent analytic functions. He was born in Yerevan in a family of refugees from the town Van of Western Armenia escaping from the Armenian genocide of 1915 in Turkey. Mkhitar Djrbashian created some well-known mathematical theories (see, e.g.) and did everything possible for the development of Armenian Mathematical School to the high international standards in many branches of mathematics.

== Family ==
Djrbashian was born to an old Van family, established before the fourteenth century, long before the rise of the Ottoman Empire, by a successful merchant who returned to his homeland from Iran and bought a piece of land in the Aygestan (Armenian: Այգեստան, i.e. gardens) district of Van. The community water source was in his land, and his family got the obligation to make a fair distribution of the scarce water among the channels to Aygestan gardens for many centuries, according to quotas established by the community. This was the origin of the family name Jerbashkhian (Armenian: Ջրբաշխյան, i.e. water distributor). Mkhitar Djrbashian's father Mkrtich was one of the seven founders of the Van Guild of Merchants, which anticipated the possibility of Turkish military actions against the civilian population of their town and started collecting weapons for self-defense. In June 1915, he participated as a soldier in people's volunteer corps against the Turkish regular army sent to massacre all Armenian inhabitants and surrounding villages. Thanks to the offensive of the Russian Army or, more exactly, its Armenian volunteer unit, the inhabitants of Van and some villagers of the Vaspurakan Province were saved and then migrated with the Russian Army to the Erivan Governorate of Russian Empire. In the first years of the Soviet regime, Mkrtich Jerbashkhian continued importing European goods and selling them in the shops of his commercial company in Yerevan, Tiflis, and Baku. For this reason, he was deprived of voting rights in the Soviet Union and his elder son Mkhitar was excluded from the last year of school. Mkrtich Jerbashkhian kept secret his fluency in French and German languages and his political views to avoid NKVD repression.

Other branches of the Jerbashkhian family also were forced to leave their fatherland. Some of them migrated to Yerevan and Tiflis, others appeared as refugees in Marseille.

Mkhitar Djrbashian had two sisters: Sirvard (1904–1990) and Gohar (1921–2000), and a brother Eduard Jerbashkhian (1923–1999), a literary critic, full member of the Armenian National Academy of Sciences (1982) and the director of its Institute of Literature from 1977 to 1999. The family name Jerbashkhian later was simplified to Jerbashian, and it appears as Dzhrbashjan or Djrbashian in many mathematical publications in accordance with the Russian spelling.

== Biography ==
Mkhitar Djrbashian was born in Yerevan on September 11, 1918. Being deprived of continuing his secondary education in Yerevan, he accomplished his school education in Tiflis in 1936, thanks to the assistance of his uncle's family. Back in Yerevan after Stalin's declaration that "children are not responsible for their parents", Mkhitar Djrbashian could enroll in Yerevan State University, where his scientific activities were encouraged by Prof. Artashes Shahinian, a talented teacher who directed his pupils mainly to Approximation theory.

Mkhitar Djrbashian was greatly influenced by the results of Rolf Nevanlinna in complex analysis, which he studied attending lectures delivered by Mstislav Keldysh at Yerevan State University in 1944. This directed his scientific research to the field of complex analysis.

Under the supervision of Prof. Artashes Shahinian, Mkhitar Djrbashian was the first to defend a Candidate of Sciences Thesis in mathematics at Yerevan State University in 1945, with some new, original results on weighted Nevanlinna classes of meromorphic functions (see Section 216 in). In 1949 Mkhitar Djrbashian defended his Doctor of Science Thesis in Moscow State University with excellent references from Prof. Mstislav Keldysh, Prof. Alexander Gelfond and Prof. Alexei Markushevich ru:Маркушевич, Алексей Иванович.

Being the leading figure in the mathematics of Armenia, a Full Member of Armenian Academy of Sciences from 1956, Mkhitar Djrbashian did everything possible for the development of Armenian Mathematical School to the high international standards in many branches of mathematics. He was the founder and the director of Institute of Mathematics of National Academy of Sciences of Armenia (1971–1989), then the honorary director of the same institute up to his death on May 6, 1994, of a heart attack. He was the founder of Izvestiya Natsionalnoi Akademii Nauk Armenii, Matematika (English translation: Journal of Contemporary Mathematical Analysis, Armenian Academy of Sciences, Allerton Press Inc.) and its editor in chief (1971–1994), the Dean of the Physical-Mathematical and then Mechanical-Mathematical Department of Yerevan State University (1957–1960), and the head of the Chair of Function Theory (1978–1986).
