= Arakelyan's theorem =

Mathematical theorem

In mathematics, Arakelyan's theorem is a generalization of Mergelyan's theorem from compact subsets of an open subset of the complex plane to relatively closed subsets of an open subset.

== Theorem ==
Let Ω be an open subset of $\Complex$ and E a relatively closed subset of Ω. By Ω^{*} is denoted the Alexandroff compactification of Ω.

Arakelyan's theorem states that for every f continuous in E and holomorphic in the interior of E and for every ε > 0 there exists g holomorphic in Ω such that |g − f| < ε on E if and only if Ω^{*} \ E is connected and locally connected.

== See also ==
- Runge's theorem
- Mergelyan's theorem
