= Hilbert's fourth problem =

Construct all metric spaces where lines resemble those on a sphere

In mathematics, Hilbert's fourth problem in the 1900 list of Hilbert's problems is a foundational question in geometry. In one statement derived from the original, it was to find — up to an isomorphism — all geometries that have an axiomatic system of the classical geometry (Euclidean, hyperbolic and elliptic), with those axioms of congruence that involve the concept of the angle dropped, and 'triangle inequality', regarded as an axiom, added.

If one assumes the continuity axiom in addition, then, in the case of the Euclidean plane, we come to the problem posed by Jean Gaston Darboux: "To determine all the calculus of variation problems in the plane whose solutions are all the plane straight lines."

There are several interpretations of the original statement of David Hilbert. Nevertheless, a solution was sought, with the German mathematician Georg Hamel being the first to contribute to the solution of Hilbert's fourth problem.

A recognized solution was given by Soviet mathematician Aleksei Pogorelov in 1973. In 1976, Armenian mathematician Rouben V. Ambartzumian proposed another proof of Hilbert's fourth problem.

== Original statement ==
Hilbert discusses the existence of non-Euclidean geometry and non-Archimedean geometry

...a geometry in which all the axioms of ordinary euclidean geometry hold, and in particular all the congruence axioms except the one of the congruence of triangles (or all except the theorem of the equality of the base angles in the isosceles triangle), and in which, besides, the proposition that in every triangle the sum of two sides is greater than the third is assumed as a particular axiom.

Due to the idea that a 'straight line' is defined as the shortest path between two points, he mentions how congruence of triangles is necessary for Euclid's proof that a straight line in the plane is the shortest distance between two points. He summarizes as follows:

The theorem of the straight line as the shortest distance between two points and the essentially equivalent theorem of Euclid about the sides of a triangle, play an important part not only in number theory but also in the theory of surfaces and in the calculus of variations. For this reason, and because I believe that the thorough investigation of the conditions for the validity of this theorem will throw a new light upon the idea of distance, as well as upon other elementary ideas, e. g., upon the idea of the plane, and the possibility of its definition by means of the idea of the straight line, the construction and systematic treatment of the geometries here possible seem to me desirable.

== Flat metrics ==
Perspective triangles $ABC$ and $abc$.

Desargues's theorem, named after Girard Desargues, states that if two triangles lie on a plane such that the lines connecting corresponding vertices of the triangles meet at one point, the three points at which the prolongations of three pairs of corresponding sides of the triangles intersect lie on one line. The necessary condition for solving Hilbert's fourth problem is the requirement that a metric space that satisfies the axioms of this problem should be Desarguesian. That is:

- if the space is of dimension 2, then Desargues's theorem and its inverse should hold;
- if the space is of dimension greater than 2, then any three points should lie on one plane.

For Desarguesian spaces Georg Hamel proved that every solution of Hilbert's fourth problem can be represented in a real projective space $RP^{n}$ or in a convex domain of $RP^{n}$ if one determines the congruence of segments by equality of their lengths in a special metric for which the lines of the projective space are geodesics.

Metrics of this type are called flat or projective.

Thus, the solution of Hilbert's fourth problem was reduced to the solution of the problem of the constructive determination of all complete flat metrics.

Hamel solved this problem under the assumption of high regularity of the metric. However, as simple examples show, the class of regular flat metrics is smaller than the class of all flat metrics. The axioms of geometries under consideration imply only the continuity of the metrics. Therefore, to solve Hilbert's fourth problem completely, it is necessary to determine constructively all the continuous flat metrics.

== Prehistory of Hilbert's fourth problem ==
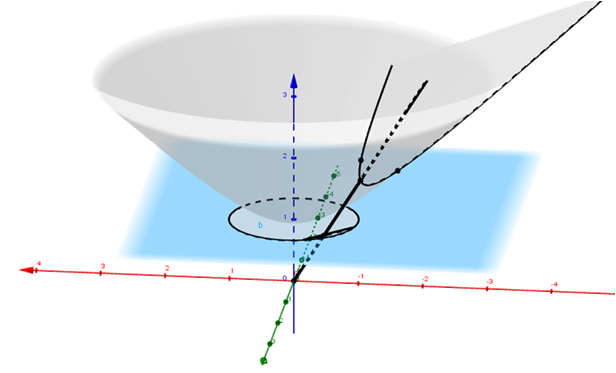
Cayley–Klein model of Lobachevsky geometry

Before 1900, there was known the Cayley–Klein model of Lobachevsky geometry in the unit disk, according to which geodesic lines are chords of the disk and the distance between points is defined as a logarithm of the cross-ratio of a quadruple. For two-dimensional Riemannian metrics, Eugenio Beltrami (1835–1900) proved that flat metrics are the metrics of constant curvature.

For multidimensional Riemannian metrics this statement was proved by E. Cartan in 1930.

In 1890, for solving problems on the theory of numbers, Hermann Minkowski introduced a notion of the space that nowadays is called the finite-dimensional Banach space.

=== Minkowski space ===
Minkowski space

Let $F_{0}\subset \mathbb{E}^{n}$be a compact convex hypersurface in a Euclidean space defined by

$$F_{0}=\{y\in E^{n}:F(y)=1\},$$

where the function $F=F(y)$ satisfies the following conditions:

1. $F(y)\geqslant 0, \qquad F(y)=0 \Leftrightarrow y=0;$
2. $F(\lambda y)=\lambda F(y), \qquad \lambda\geqslant 0;$
3. $F(y)\in C^{k}(E^{n}\setminus \{0\}), \qquad k\geqslant 3;$
4. and the form $\frac{\partial^2 F^2}{\partial y^i \, \partial y^j}\xi^i\xi^j>0$ is positively definite.

The length of the vector OA is defined by:

$$\|OA\|_M=\frac{\|OA\|_{\mathbb{E}}}{\|OL\|_{\mathbb{E}}}.$$

A space with this metric is called Minkowski space.

The hypersurface $F_{0}$ is convex and can be irregular. The defined metric is flat.

=== Finsler spaces ===
Let M and $TM=\{(x,y)|x\in M, y\in T_xM\}$ be a smooth finite-dimensional manifold and its tangent bundle, respectively. The function $F(x,y)\colon TM \rightarrow [0, +\infty)$ is called Finsler metric if

1. $F(x,y)\in C^{k}(TM\setminus \{0\}), \qquad k\geqslant 3$;
2. For any point $x\in M$ the restriction of $F(x, y)$ on $T_{x}M$ is the Minkowski norm.

$(M, F)$ is Finsler space.

=== Hilbert's geometry ===
Hilbert's metric

Let $U\subset (\mathbb{E}^{n+1}, \| \cdot \|_{\mathbb{E}})$ be a bounded open convex set with the boundary of class C^{2} and positive normal curvatures. Similarly to the Lobachevsky space, the hypersurface $\partial U$ is called the absolute of Hilbert's geometry.

Hilbert's distance (see fig.) is defined by

$$d_U(p, q)=\frac{1}{2} \ln \frac{\|q-q_1\|_E}{\|q-p_1\|_E}\times \frac{\|p-p_1\|_E}{\|p-q_1\|_E}.$$

Hilbert–Finsler metric

The distance $d_{U}$ induces the Hilbert–Finsler metric $F_{U}$ on U. For any $x\in U$ and $y\in T_{x}U$ (see fig.), we have

$$F_U(x, y)=\frac{1}{2}\|y\|_{\mathbb{E}} \left(    \frac{1}{\|x-x_{+}\|_{\mathbb{E}}}+\frac{1}{\|x-x_{-}\|_{\mathbb{E}}}   \right).$$

The metric is symmetric and flat. In 1895, Hilbert introduced this metric as a generalization of the Lobachevsky geometry. If the hypersurface $\partial U$ is an ellipsoid, then we have the Lobachevsky geometry.

=== Funk metric ===
In 1930, Funk introduced a non-symmetric metric. It is defined in a domain bounded by a closed convex hypersurface and is also flat.

== σ-metrics ==
=== Sufficient condition for flat metrics ===
Georg Hamel was first to contribute to the solution of Hilbert's fourth problem. He proved the following statement.

Theorem. A regular Finsler metric $F(x,y)=F(x_1,\ldots,x_n,y_1,\ldots,y_n)$ is flat if and only if it satisfies the conditions:

$$\frac{\partial^2 F^2}{\partial x^i \, \partial y^j} = \frac{\partial^2 F^2}{\partial x^j \, \partial y^i}, \, i,j=1,\ldots,n.$$

=== Crofton formula ===
Consider a set of all oriented lines on a plane. Each line is defined by the parameters $\rho$ and $\varphi,$ where $\rho$ is a distance from the origin to the line, and $\varphi$ is an angle between the line and the x-axis. Then the set of all oriented lines is homeomorphic to a circular cylinder of radius 1 with the area element $dS = d\rho \, d\varphi$. Let $\gamma$ be a rectifiable curve on a plane. Then the length of $\gamma$ is
$$L = \frac{1}{4} \iint_\Omega n( \rho, \varphi) \, dp \, d\varphi$$
where $\Omega$ is a set of lines that intersect the curve $\gamma$, and $n(p, \varphi)$ is the number of intersections of the line with $\gamma$. Crofton proved this statement in 1870.

A similar statement holds for a projective space.

=== Blaschke–Busemann measure ===
In 1966, in his talk at the International Mathematical Congress in Moscow, Herbert Busemann introduced a new class of flat metrics. On a set of lines on the projective plane $RP^{2}$ he introduced a completely additive non-negative measure $\sigma$, which satisfies the following conditions:

1. $\sigma (\tau P)=0$, where $\tau P$ is a set of straight lines passing through a point P;
2. $\sigma (\tau X)>0$, where $\tau X$ is a set of straight lines passing through some set X that contains a straight line segment;
3. $\sigma (RP^{n})$ is finite.

If we consider a $\sigma$-metric in an arbitrary convex domain $\Omega$ of a projective space $RP^{2}$, then condition 3) should be replaced by the following: for any set H such that H is contained in $\Omega$ and the closure of H does not intersect the boundary of $\Omega$, the inequality

$\sigma(\pi H)<\infty$ holds.

Using this measure, the $\sigma$-metric on $RP^{2}$ is defined by

$$|x,y|=\sigma \left(  \tau [x,y]  \right),$$

where $\tau [x,y]$ is the set of straight lines that intersect the segment $[x,y]$.

The triangle inequality for this metric follows from Pasch's theorem.

Theorem. $\sigma$-metric on $RP^{2}$ is flat, i.e., the geodesics are the straight lines of the projective space.

But Busemann was far from the idea that $\sigma$-metrics exhaust all flat metrics. He wrote, "The freedom in the choice of a metric with given geodesics is for non-Riemannian metrics so great that it may be doubted whether there really exists a convincing characterization of all Desarguesian spaces".

== Two-dimensional case ==
=== Pogorelov's theorem ===
The following theorem was proved by Pogorelov in 1973

Theorem. Any two-dimensional continuous complete flat metric is a $\sigma$-metric.

Thus Hilbert's fourth problem for the two-dimensional case was completely solved.

A consequence of this is that you can glue boundary to boundary two copies of the same planar convex shape, with an angle twist between them, you will get a 3D object without crease lines, the two faces being developable.

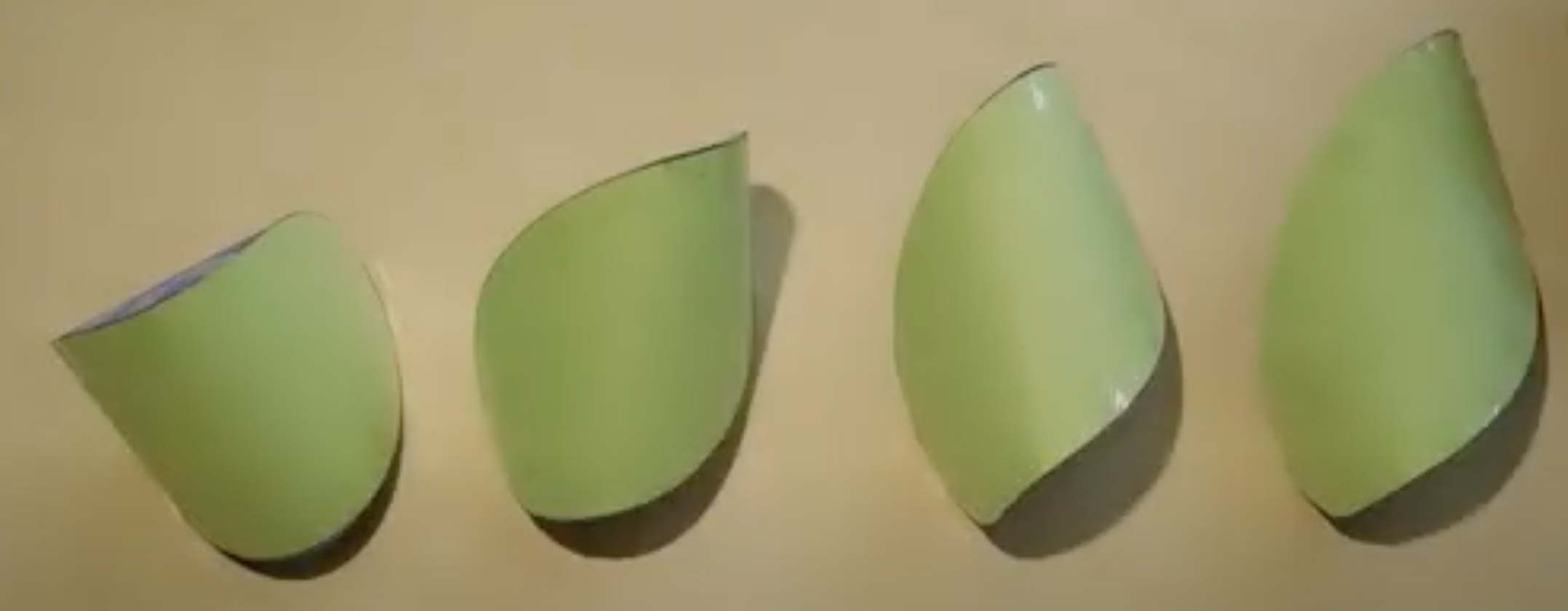
Illustration of the Pogorelov Theorem

=== Ambartsumian's proofs ===
In 1976, Ambartsumian proposed another proof of Hilbert's fourth problem.

His proof uses the fact that in the two-dimensional case the whole measure can be restored by its values on biangles, and thus be defined on triangles in the same way as the area of a triangle is defined on a sphere. Since the triangle inequality holds, it follows that this measure is positive on non-degenerate triangles and is determined on all Borel sets. However, this structure can not be generalized to higher dimensions because of Hilbert's third problem solved by Max Dehn.

In the two-dimensional case, polygons with the same volume are scissors-congruent. As was shown by Dehn this is not true for a higher dimension.

== Three-dimensional case ==
For three-dimensional case, Pogorelov proved the following theorem.

Theorem. Any three-dimensional regular complete flat metric is a $\sigma$-metric.

However, in the three-dimensional case $\sigma$-measures can take either positive or negative values. The necessary and sufficient conditions for the regular metric defined by the function of the set $\sigma$ to be flat are the following three conditions:

1. the value $\sigma$ on any plane equals zero,
2. the value $\sigma$ in any cone is non-negative,
3. the value $\sigma$ is positive if the cone contains interior points.

Moreover, Pogorelov showed that any complete continuous flat metric in the three-dimensional case is the limit of regular $\sigma$-metrics with the uniform convergence on any compact sub-domain of the metric's domain. He called them generalized $\sigma$-metrics.

Thus Pogorelov could prove the following statement.

Theorem. In the three-dimensional case any complete continuous flat metric is a $\sigma$-metric in generalized meaning.

Busemann, in his review to Pogorelov’s book "Hilbert’s Fourth Problem" wrote, "In the spirit of the time Hilbert restricted himself to n = 2, 3 and so does Pogorelov. However, this has doubtless pedagogical reasons, because he addresses a wide class of readers. The real difference is between n = 2 and n>2. Pogorelov's method works for n>3, but requires greater technicalities".

== Multidimensional case ==
The multi-dimensional case of the Fourth Hilbert problem was studied by Szabo. In 1986, he proved, as he wrote, the generalized Pogorelov theorem.

Theorem. Each n-dimensional Desarguesian space of the class $C^{n+2}, n>2$, is generated by the Blaschke–Busemann construction.

A $\sigma$-measure that generates a flat measure has the following properties:

1. the $\sigma$-measure of hyperplanes passing through a fixed point is equal to zero;
2. the $\sigma$-measure of the set of hyperplanes intersecting two segments [x, y], [y, z], where x, y та z are not collinear, is positive.

There was given the example of a flat metric not generated by the Blaschke–Busemann construction. Szabo described all continuous flat metrics in terms of generalized functions.

== Hilbert's fourth problem and convex bodies ==
Hilbert's fourth problem is also closely related to the properties of convex bodies. A convex polyhedron is called a zonotope if it is the Minkowski sum of segments. A convex body which is a limit of zonotopes in the Blaschke – Hausdorff metric is called a zonoid. For zonoids, the support function is represented by

$$h(x) = \int_{S^{n-1}} \left|\left\langle x, u\right\rangle\right| \partial \sigma (u),$$	1

where $\sigma (u)$ is an even positive Borel measure on a sphere $S^{n-1}$.

The Minkowski space is generated by the Blaschke–Busemann construction if and only if the support function of the indicatrix has the form of (1), where $\sigma (u)$ is even and not necessarily of positive Borel measure. The bodies bounded by such hypersurfaces are called generalized zonoids.

The octahedron $|x_1| + |x_2| + |x_3| \leq 1$ in the Euclidean space $E^3$ is not a generalized zonoid. From the above statement it follows that the flat metric of Minkowski space with the norm $\|x\| = \max\{|x_1|, |x_2|, |x_3|\}$ is not generated by the Blaschke–Busemann construction.

== Generalizations of Hilbert's fourth problem ==
There was found the correspondence between the planar n-dimensional Finsler metrics and special symplectic forms on the Grassmann manifold $G(n+1,2)$ в $E^{n+1}$.

There were considered periodic solutions of Hilbert's fourth problem :

1. Let (M, g) be a compact locally Euclidean Riemannian manifold. Suppose that $C^2$ Finsler metric on M with the same geodesics as in the metric g is given. Then the Finsler metric is the sum of a locally Minkovski metric and a closed 1-form.
2. Let (M, g) be a compact symmetric Riemannian space of rank greater than one. If F is a symmetric $C^2$ Finsler metric whose geodesics coincide with geodesics of the Riemannian metric g, then (M, g) is a symmetric Finsler space. The analogue of this theorem for rank-one symmetric spaces has not been proven yet.

Another exposition of Hilbert's fourth problem can be found in work of Paiva.

== Unsolved problems ==
1. Hilbert's fourth problem for non-symmetric Finsler metric has not yet been solved.
2. The description of the metric on $RP^{n}$ for which k-planes minimize the k-area has not been given (Busemann).
