= Sergey Mergelyan =

Armenian mathematician

- Սերգեյ Մերգելյան
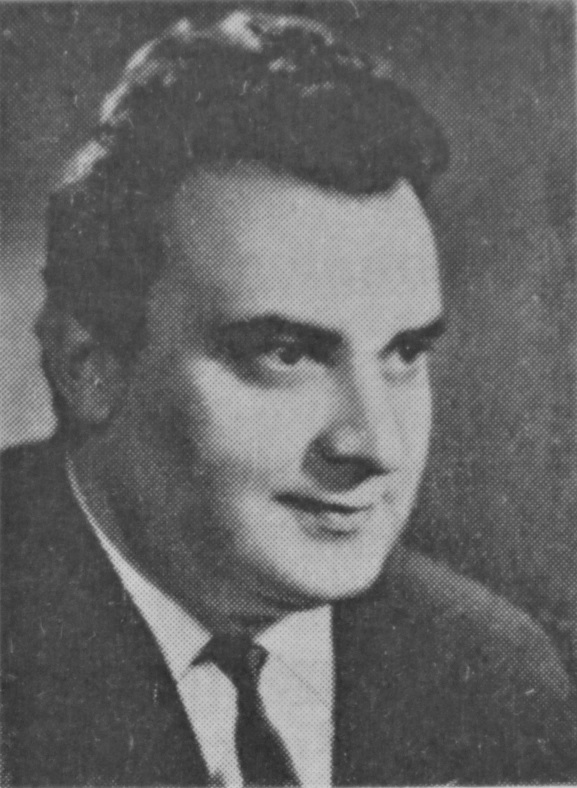
- Born: 19 May 1928; Simferopol, Crimea, Soviet Union
- Died: 20 August 2008 (aged 80); Los Angeles, United States
- Resting place: Novodevichie Memorial Cemetery in Moscow, Russia
- Known for: Mergelyan's theorem
- Awards: Stalin Prize (1952)
- Scientific career
- Workplaces: Steklov Institute of Mathematics
- Doctoral advisors: Mstislav Keldysh; Artashes Shahinyan

Sergey Nikitovich Mergelyan (Armenian: Սերգեյ Մերգելյան; 19 May 1928 – 20 August 2008) was a Soviet and Armenian mathematician, who made major contributions to the Approximation theory. The modern Complex Approximation Theory is based on Mergelyan's classical work. Corresponding Member of the Academy of Sciences of the Soviet Union (since 1953), member of NAS ASSR (since 1956).

The surname "Mergelov" given at birth was changed for patriotic reasons to the more Armenian-sounding "Mergelyan" by the mathematician himself before his trip to Moscow.

He was a laureate of the Stalin Prize (1952) and the Order of St. Mesrop Mashtots (2008). He was the youngest Doctor of Sciences in the history of the USSR (at the age of 20), and the youngest corresponding member of the Academy of Sciences of the Soviet Union (the title was conferred at the age of 24). During his postgraduate studies, the 20-year-old Mergelyan solved one of the fundamental problems of the mathematical theory of functions, which had not been solved for more than 70 years. His theorem on the possibility of uniform polynomial approximation of functions of a complex variable is recognized by the classical Mergelyan theorem, and is included in the course of the theory of functions.

Although he himself was not a computer designer, Mergelyan was a pioneer in Soviet computational mathematics.

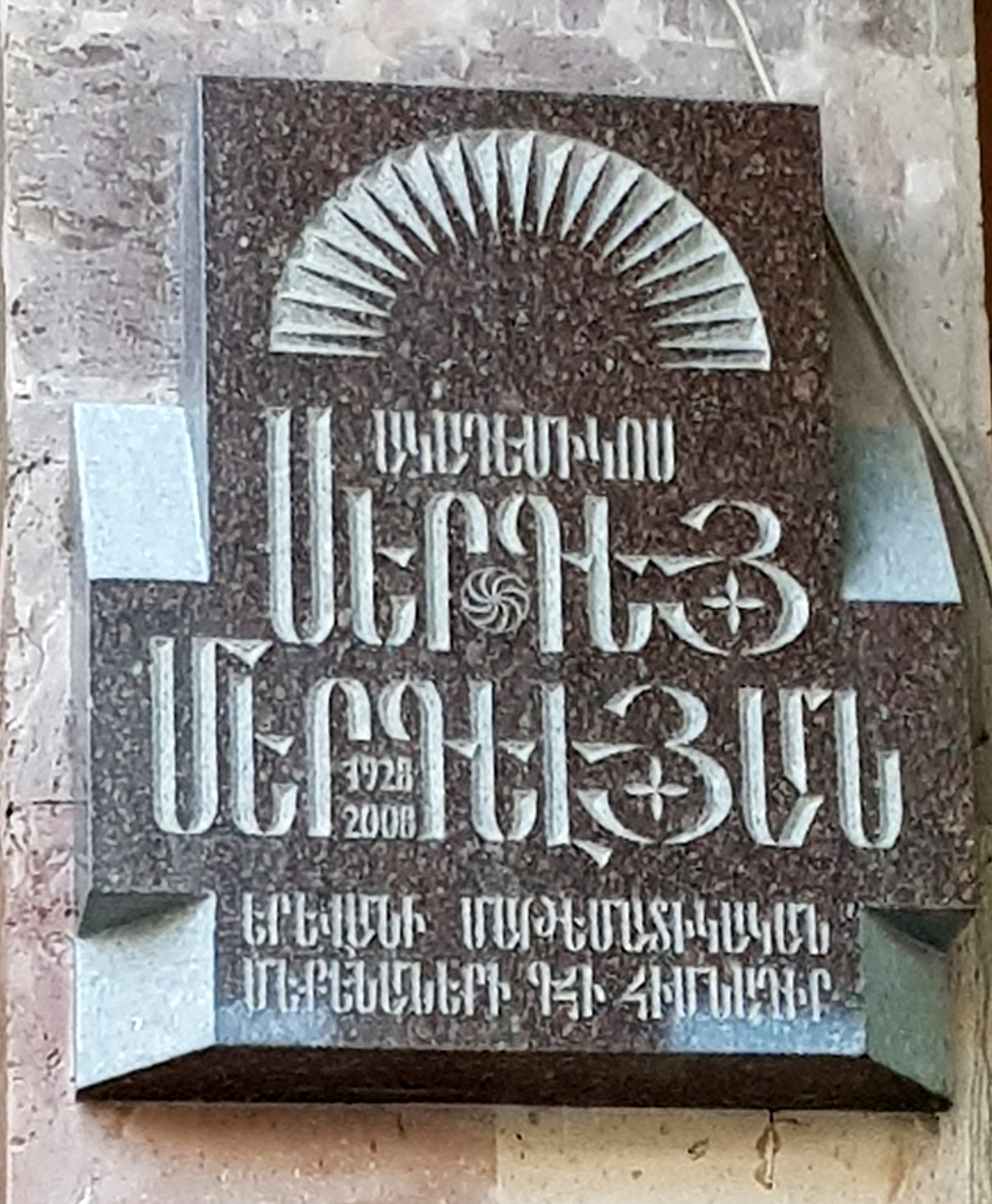
Plaque in Yerevan honoring Mergelyan

== Biography ==
=== Early years ===
Sergey Mergelyan was born on 19 May 1928 in Simferopol, the then capital of the Crimean Autonomous Soviet Socialist Republic to Armenian parents. His father was Nikita (Mkrtich) Ivanovich Mergelov, a former private entrepreneur, and his mother was Lyudmila Ivanovna Vyrodova, the daughter of a bank manager who had been murdered in 1918. In 1936, when Sergey was 7 or 8 years old, the family was deported from Simferopol to the Siberian settlement of Narym, Tomsk Oblast. The family lived in Siberia together for two years, until Sergey and Lyudmila were allowed by a court to relocate to Kerch in 1937. The following year, Lyudmila obtained clemency for her husband and the family was reunited in Kerch. As tensions in the region peaked during WWII, the Mergelove family left Crimea and settled in Yerevan, the capital of the Armenian Soviet Socialist Republic, where they would remain for the rest of Sergey's upbringing.

=== Education ===
Mergelyan was brought up in the Soviet education system and, after moving to Yerevan at the age of 13, quickly became recognized for his mathematical skills. By the age of 16, in 1944, he had passed the exams required for finishing primary school and was quickly enrolled in the Physics and Mathematics program at Yerevan State University.

Once enrolled in university, Margelyan was able to complete the typically five year undergraduate program in only three, and immediately commenced postgraduate study at the Steklov Institute of Mathematics, a faculty of the USSR Academy of Sciences. Achieving his doctorate in 1949 at the age of 20, Mergelyan is credited as the youngest person to be awarded a Doctorate of Physical and Mathematical Sciences.

=== Career ===
Mergelyan graduated from Yerevan University in 1947. From 1945 to 1957 he worked at the Yerevan University, and from 1954 to 1958 and from 1964 to 1968 at the Moscow State University named after MV Lomonosov.

When he was 24 he became a corresponding member of the Academy of Sciences of the Soviet Union, which, from the point of view of young age, is yet another absolute record among USSR scientists. He has been a symbol of a young scientist in former USSR. Indira Gandhi, among other famous people in USSR and abroad, has been a friend of Mergelyan from the early 1950s. In 1978, after her official visit to Moscow, Gandhi had also a private visit to Yerevan just as a guest of Mergelyan. In 1952 he was awarded the Stalin Prize.

Mergelyan was also a talented organizer of science. He played a leading role in establishing Yerevan Scientific Research Institute of Mathematical Machines (YerSRIMM). On 14 July 1956 the Yerevan Scientific Research Institute of Mathematical Machines (YerNIIMM) was founded․ He became the first director of the institute and headed it in 1956-1960. Soon the institute became popular as the "Mergelyan Institute". This unofficial name is preserved and still used nowadays․

In 1961 he returned to the field of pure mathematics. He resumed work at the Moscow Steklov Mathematical Institute of Academy of Sciences of the Soviet Union. In 1963 he was elected Deputy Academician of the Secretary of the Department of Mathematics of the Academy of Sciences of the Soviet Union (Nikolai Nikolaevich Bogolyubov). In 1964 he was appointed head of the department of complex analysis at the Mathematical Institute, the position he retained until 2002, the same year he was reinstated as a professor of the Mechanics and Mathematics Faculty of the Moscow State University.

In 1968, he again left the post of professor of the faculty and only engaged in scientific work. Mergelyan had "traveling permission", and often was on foreign business trips. In 1970 he gave a presentation as a guest speaker at the International Congress of Mathematicians in Nice.

== Scientific works ==
Mergelyan's main works include theory of functions of complex variables, theory of approximation, and theory of potential and harmonic functions. In 1951 he formulated and proved the famous result from complex analysis called Mergelyan's theorem. This solved an old classical problem. The theorem completed a long series of studies, begun in 1885, and composed of the classical results of Karl Weierstrass, Carl Runge, J. Walsh, Mikhail Lavrentyev, Mstislav Keldysh and others. The new terms "Mergelyan's theorem" and "Mergelyan's sets" found their place in textbooks and monographs on approximation theory.

Several years later he solved another famous problem, the Sergei Bernstein Approximation Problem. Mergelyan also has many important results in other areas of complex analysis including the theory of pointwise approximations by polynomials.

His research was the study of the approximation of continuous functions satisfying the smoothness properties for an arbitrary set (1962) and the solution of Bernstein's approximate problem (1963). Mergelyan conducted in-depth studies and obtained valuable results in such areas as best approximation by polynomials on an arbitrary continuum, weighted approximations by polynomials on the real axis, pointwise approximation by polynomials on closed sets of the complex plane, uniform approximation by harmonic functions on compact sets and entire functions on an unbounded continuum, uniqueness harmonic functions. In the theory of differential equations, his results related to the sphere of the Cauchy problem and some other questions. Mergelyan's scientific achievements significantly contributed to the formation, development and international recognition of the Armenian mathematical school, as evidenced by the one organized in Yerevan in 1965, at the initiative and with the active participation of Sergey Mergelyan a major international conference on the theory of functions. Many prominent mathematicians of the world took part in the conference, which promoted international cooperation and further promotion of the Armenian mathematical school.

== Death ==
Sergey Mergelyan died on 20 August 2008. The farewell ceremony took place on 23 August 2008 at the Glendale Cemetery in California. At the request of the deceased, his ashes were transported to Moscow and buried at Novodevichy Cemetery next to his mother and his wife.

== Awards and prizes ==
- Stalin Prize, 2nd class (1952) for works on the constructive theory of functions, completed by the article "Some Problems in the Constructive Theory of Functions", published in the Proceedings of the Steklov Mathematical Institute of the Academy of Sciences of the Soviet Union (1951)
- Order of St. Mesrop Mashtots (26.05.2008) – On the occasion of the 80th anniversary of mathematician, the Consul General of Armenia in the USA handed over the Order of St. Mesrop Mashtots to the scientist and read the message of the President of Armenia, Serzh Sargsyan.
- Order of the Red Banner of Labour (17.09.1975)

== Works ==
- «Некоторые вопросы конструктивной теории функций» (Труды Математического института АН СССР, т. 3, 1951)
- «Равномерные приближения функций комплексного переменного» (Успехи математических наук, т. 8, вып. 2, 1952),
- «О полноте систем аналитических функций» (Успехи математических наук, т. 7, вып. 4, 1953)
