= Rouben V. Ambartzumian =

Armenian mathematician (born 1941)

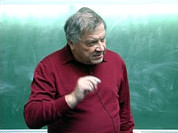
- Born: October 28, 1941 (age 85)
- Education: Mathematician, Academician NAS RA
- Father: Viktor Ambartsumian
- Scientific career
- Fields: Integral Geometry, Stochastic Geometry
- Doctoral advisor: Yuri Prokhorov

Rouben V. Ambartzumian (Armenian: Ռուբեն Վ․ Համբարձումյան;Russian: Рубен В. Амбарцумян; born 1941) is an Armenian mathematician and Academician of National Academy of Sciences of Armenia. He works in Stochastic Geometry and Integral Geometry where he created a new branch, combinatorial integral geometry. The subject of combinatorial integral geometry received support from mathematicians K. Krickeberg and D. G. Kendall at the 1976 Sevan Symposium (Armenia) which was sponsored by Royal Society of London and The London Mathematical Society. In the framework of the later theory he solved a number of classical problems in particular the solution to the Buffon Sylvester problem as well as Hilbert's fourth problem in 1976. He is a holder of the Rollo Davidson Prize of Cambridge University of 1982. Rouben's interest in Integral Geometry was inherited from his father. Nobel Prize winner Allan McLeod Cormack wrote: "Ambartsumian gave the first numerical inversion of the Radon transform and it gives the lie to the often made statement that computed tomography would have been impossible without computers". Victor Hambardzumyan, in his book "A Life in Astrophysics", wrote about the work of Rouben V. Ambartzumian, "More recently, it came to my knowledge that the invariance principle or invariant embedding was applied in a purely mathematical field of integral geometry where it gave birth to a novel, combinatorial branch." See R. V. Ambartzumian, «Combinatorial Integral Geometry», John Wiley, 1982.

== Experience ==
- 1968 – present, Head of department, Institute of Mathematics, National Academy of Sciences of Armenia
- 1990 – 2010 Chief Editor of the Izvestia NAN RA Matematika (in Russian)
- 1990 – 2010 Translation Editor of Journal of Contemporary Mathematical Analysis, Allerton Press, Inc. New York (the English Translation of Izvestia NAS RA Matematika)
- 2009 -2013 Director of the FREEZWATER project, Yerevan, Armenia

== Education, scientific degrees ==
- 1986 Academician of National Academy of Sciences of Armenia
- 1975 Soviet Doctor of Mathematics and Physics, from Steklov Mathematical Institute, Moscow
- 1968 Soviet Kandidat of Mathematics and Physics, from Steklov Mathematical Institute, Moscow
- 1959–1964 Moscow State University diploma, Mathematician.

== Books authored ==
- Ambartzumian, R.V. (1982). Combinatorial Integral Geometry with Applications to Mathematical Stereology. Somerset, New Jersey: Wiley. ISBN 978-0471279778. (Review)
- Ambartzumian, R.V.; Stoyan, D.; Mecke, J. (1989). Introduction to Stochastic Geometry (in Russian). Moscow: Nauka.
- Ambartzumian, R.V.; Stoyan, D.; Mecke, J. (1989). Geometrische Wahrscheinlichkeiten und Stochastische Geometrie. Berlin: Akademie Verlag. ISBN 978-3055014499.
- Ambartzumian, R.V. (1990). Factorization Calculus and Geometric Probability. Encyclopedia of Mathematics and Its Applications. Vol. 33. Cambridge University Press. ISBN 978-0521089784.
- Ambartzumian, R.V. (2015). Wilsonian Armenia: stories behind the failed project. Lambert Academic Publishing. ISBN 978-3659753008.

== Collections of papers, Editor ==
- “Combinatorial Principles in Stochastic Geometry” (in Russian) NASRA Publishing House, Yerevan 1980

The paper contains a review of the main results of Yerevan research group in planar stochastic geometry, in particular the second order random geometrical processes using the methods of integration of combinatorial decompositions and invariant imbedding.

- “Stochastic Geometry, Geometric Statistics, Stereology” (Proceedings of the Conference held at Oberwolfach, 1983). Teubner - Texte zur Mathematik, Band 65, Leipzig 1983
- “Stochastic and Integral Geometry”, (Proceedings of the Second Sevan Symposium on Integral and Stochastic Geometry), in Acta Applicandae Mathematicae, Vol 9, Nos 1-2 (1987)

== Organizer of International Conferences ==
- 1978 – I Sevan Symposium on Integral Geometry “200 anniversary of Buffon problem”, Sevan, Armenia. Sponsorship from the Royal Society of London
- 1983 – Conference on Stochastic Geometry, Geometric Statistics and Stereology, Oberwolfach (Germany)
- 1985 – II Sevan Symposium on Integral and Stochastic Geometry, Sevan, Armenia
- 1991- Conference on Stochastic Geometry, Oberwolfach (Germany)
- 2013- Swiss –Armenian Round Table
