= Armenians in Russia =

Ethnic minority in Russia

Հայերը Ռուսաստանում Армяне в России

Total population
- 2010 census: 1,182,388 estimates: 1,800,000 (2017)—2,000,000+ (Putin, 2020); 0.8%-1.7% of the Russian population

Regions with significant populations
- Moscow, Krasnodar Krai, Stavropol Krai, Rostov Oblast

Languages
- Russian, Armenian (Eastern)

Religion
- Christianity (predominantly Armenian Apostolic)

Armenians in Russia or Russian Armenians (Note: Note that this article is about the Armenians living within Russia's current borders. Through large parts of the 19th and almost the entire 20th century, part of the Armenian homeland (known as Russian Armenia or Eastern Armenia) was under Russian and later Soviet rule. For Armenians in countries that have been part of Russia in the past, see Armenians in Azerbaijan, Armenians in Georgia, Armenians in Ukraine, Armenians in Belarus, Armenians in Moldova, Armenians in the Baltic states, Armenians in Central Asia and Armenians in Poland.) (Armenian: Հայերը Ռուսաստանում, romanized: Hayery Rrusastanum; Russian: Армяне в России, romanized: Armyane v Rossii) are one of the country's largest ethnic minorities and the largest Armenian diaspora community outside Armenia. The 2010 Russian census recorded 1,182,388 Armenians in the country. Various figures estimate that the ethnic Armenian population in Russia is actually more than 2 million. Armenians populate various regions, including Moscow, Saint Petersburg, Krasnodar Krai in the North Caucasus and as far as Vladivostok in the East.

== History ==
=== Early period ===
There has been an Armenian presence in Russia since the Late Middle Ages, when various merchants and artisans ventured west to the Crimea and the northern Caucasus in order to set up trade ties and conduct commerce.

=== Russian Empire ===
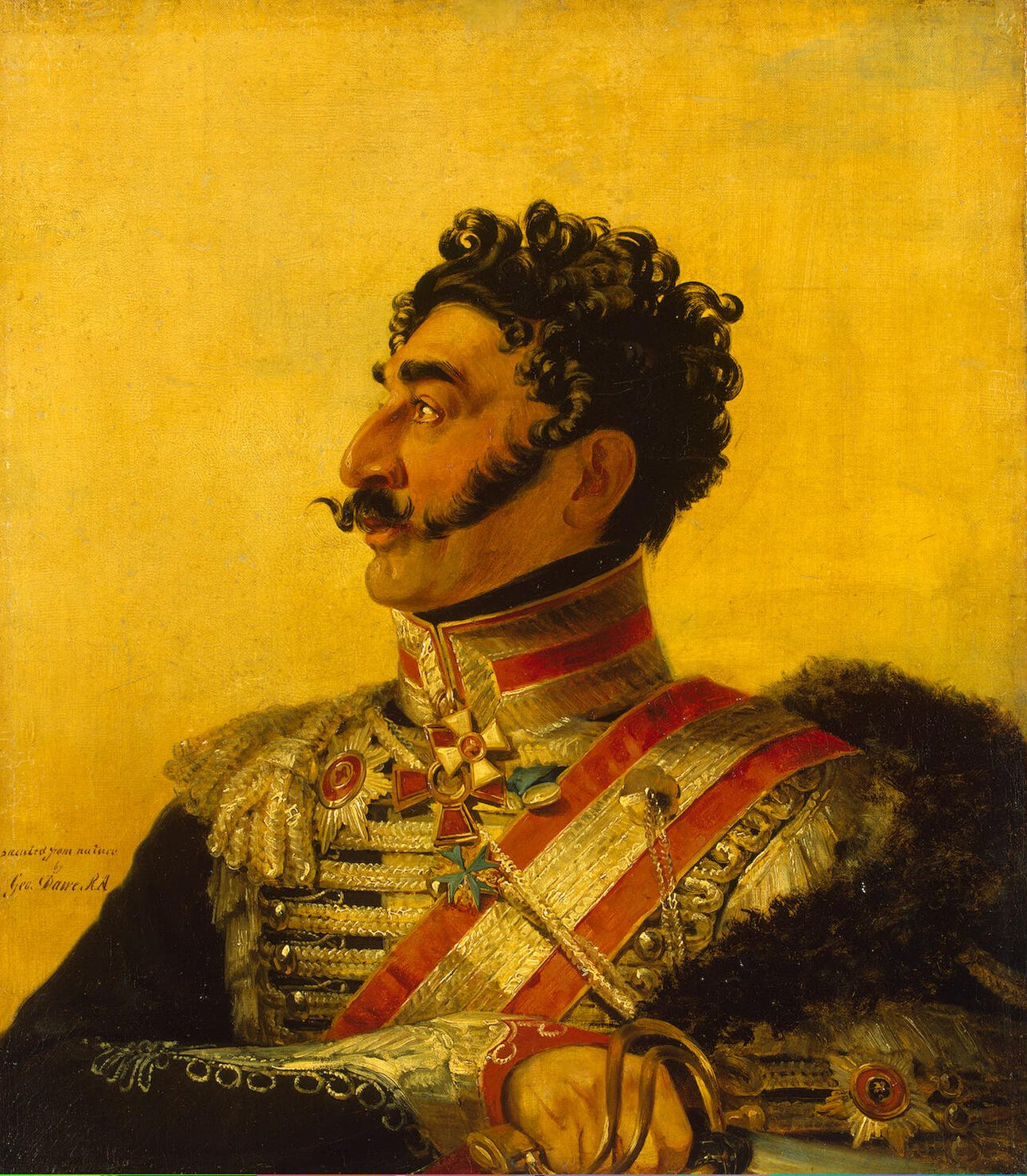
Portrait of Russian-Armenian General Valerian Madatov by George Dawe from the Military Gallery, 1820

The relationship between Armenians and Russian imperial authorities was complex, shaped as often by parallel interests as competing objectives. Large Armenian communities resided both in the Caucasus and in Russian cities well before the modern era. After the destruction of the last remaining independent Armenian states in the Middle Ages, the nobility disintegrated, leaving Armenian society composed of a mass of peasants plus a middle class who were either craftsmen or merchants. Such Armenians were to be found in most towns of Transcaucasia; indeed, at the beginning of the 19th century they formed the majority of the population in cities such as Tbilisi. Armenian merchants conducted their trade across the world and many had set up base within Russia. In 1778, Catherine the Great invited Armenian merchants from the Crimea to Russia and they established a settlement at Nakhichevan-on-Don, near Rostov-on-Don. The Russian ruling classes welcomed the Armenians' entrepreneurial skills as a boost to the economy, but they also regarded them with some suspicion. The image of the Armenian as a "wily merchant" was already widespread. Russian nobles derived their income from their estates worked by serfs and, with their aristocratic distaste for engaging in business, they had little understanding or sympathy for the way of life of mercantile Armenians. Due to the Armenian genocide, over 300 thousand Armenians migrated to the Russian Empire, specifically within Georgia and Armenia.

Nevertheless, middle-class Armenians prospered under Russian rule and they were the first to seize the new opportunities and transform themselves into a prosperous bourgeoisie when capitalism and industrialisation came to Transcaucasia in the later half of the 19th century. The Armenians more easily adapted to the new economic circumstances than their neighbours in Transcaucasia, the Georgians and the Azeris. They became the most powerful element in the municipal life of Tbilisi, the heart of the tsarist administration of the Caucasus as well as its economic center. Armenian entrepreneurs were quick to engage the oil boom which began in Transcaucasia in the 1870s, making investments in the oil fields in Baku in Azerbaijan and the refineries of Batumi on the Black Sea coast. All this meant that the tensions between Armenians, Georgians and Azeris in Russian Transcaucasia were not simply ethnic or religious in nature but also were shaped by social and economic considerations. Nevertheless, despite the stereotype of the typical Armenian as a successful businessman, at the end of the 19th century 80 percent of Russian Armenians were still peasants working the land.

=== Soviet Union ===
Many Armenians were deported around the Soviet Union states, Armenians were in many of the existing Soviet Republics, there still is a sizable population of Armenian's in post-Soviet countries, many whom still speak Russian.

A wave of Armenian's from Middle Eastern countries between 1946-1949 specifically from, Syria, Lebanon, and Iraq were called to migrate to the Soviet Union for a better life, due to many of these people were ancestors and victims of the Armenian genocide and displaced them from their homelands in the Ottoman Empire. Many whom immigrated faced discrimination, many of these people have assimilated into the modern day Eastern Armenian population, and do not speak the Western Armenian dialect or now speak have a diglossic situation between Western Armenian dialects in informal usage and an Eastern Armenian standard.

This includes Iranian Armenians, who left Iran to Soviet Armenia, many have again assimilated into the Armenian population.

=== Present day ===
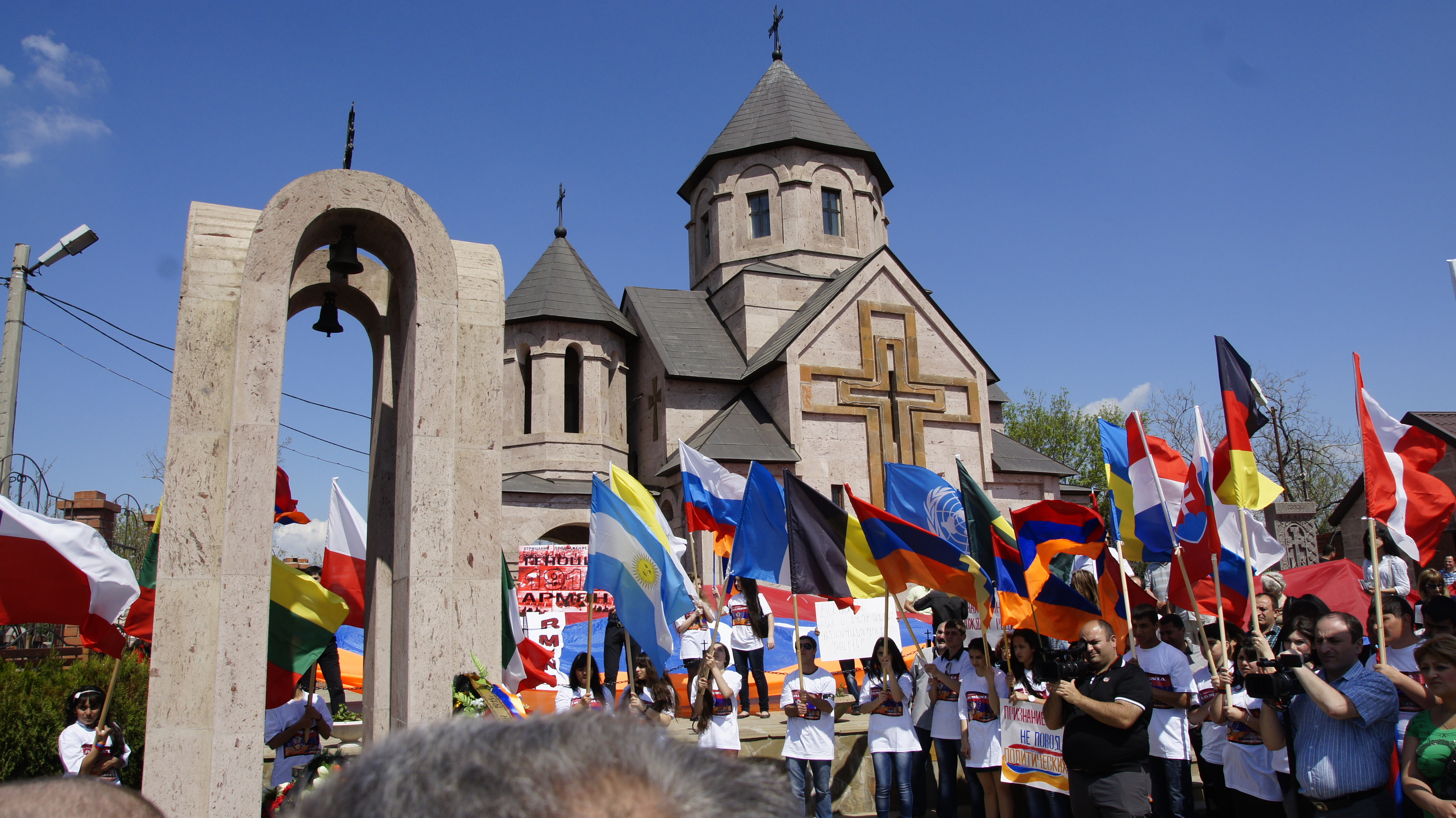
Commemoration of the Armenian genocide in Volgograd, 2012

According to the Union of Russian Armenians, there are 2.5 million Armenians living in Russia today. According to the same source, about 850,000 are immigrants from Armenia, 350,000 from Azerbaijan and 250,000 from Georgia, including 100,000 from Abkhazia and 180,000 from Central Asia, mostly Tajikistan and Turkmenistan.

The Russian government is encouraging Armenians to immigrate and settle in Russia and is providing financial and settlement incentives.

Armenians in Russia have one of the highest rates of educational attainment. According to the 2002 census 21.4% of Armenians have higher education, 31.8% have "middle special" education (i.e. vocational education), and 46.1% have secondary education.

== Distribution ==
Distribution of Armenians in Russia, 2010

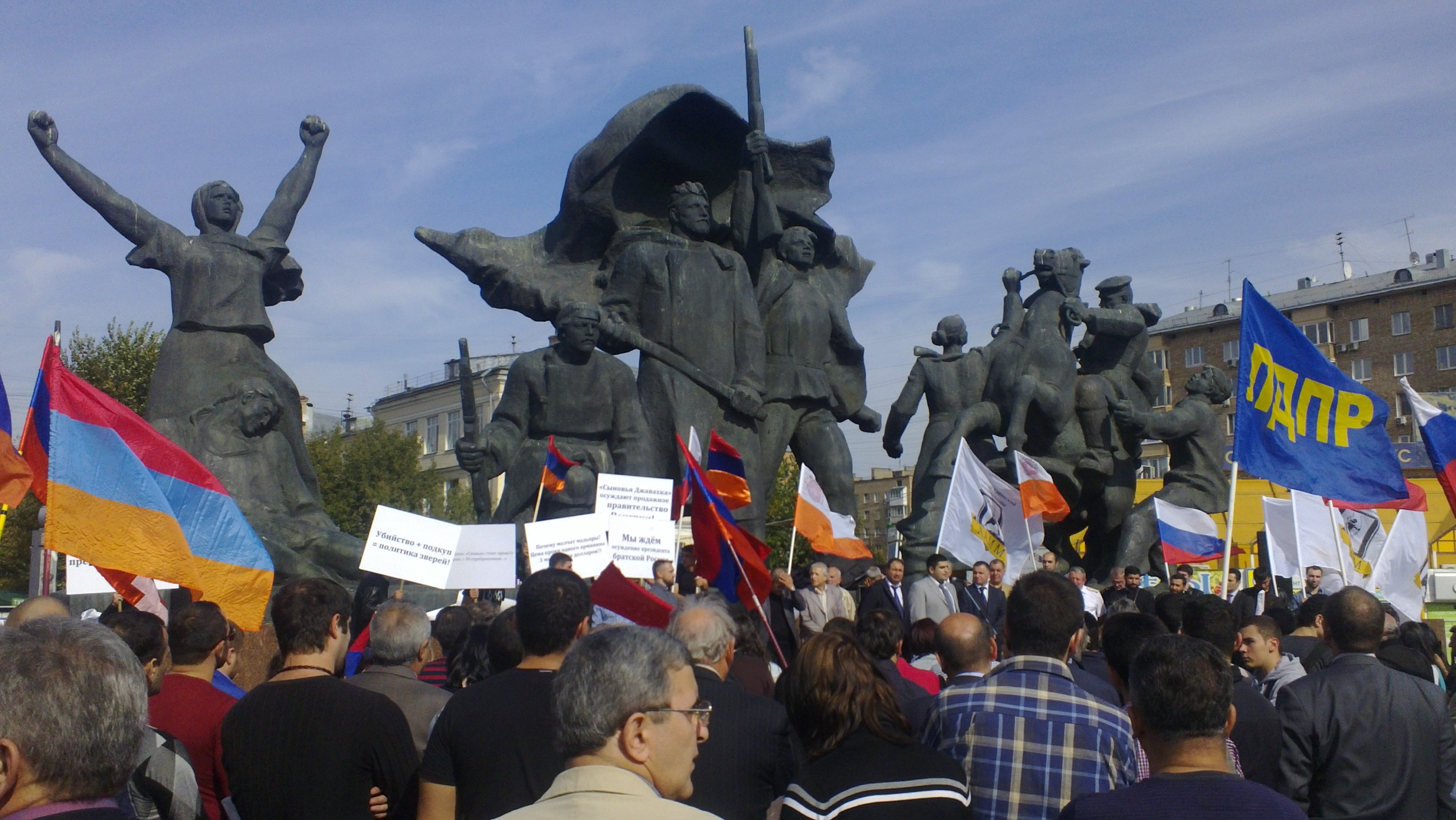
Protests in Moscow against the extradition and pardon of Ramil Safarov, 2012

Rank	Federal subject	1897	1959	1970	1979	1989	2002	2010
1	Krasnodar Krai	13,926	78,176	98,589	120,797	182,217	274,566	281,680
2	Stavropol Krai	5,385	25,618	31,096	40,504	72,530	149,249	161,324
3	Moscow	1,604	18,379	25,584	31,414	43,989	124,425	106,466
4	Rostov Oblast	27,234	49,305	53,620	56,902	62,603	109,994	110,727
5	Moscow Oblast	—N/a	5,353	5,683	7,549	9,245	39,660	63,306
6	Volgograd Oblast	—N/a	—N/a	2,898	4,229	6,784	26,974	27,846
7	Saratov Oblast	168	1,046	1,815	3,531	6,404	24,976	23,841
8	Samara Oblast	—N/a	1,027	1,629	2,216	4,162	21,566	22,981
9	Saint Petersburg	753	4,897	6,628	7,995	12,070	19,164	19,971
10	North Ossetia	2,093	12,012	13,355	12,912	13,619	17,147	16,235
11	Adygea	—N/a	3,013	5,217	6,359	10,460	15,268	15,561

=== Moscow ===
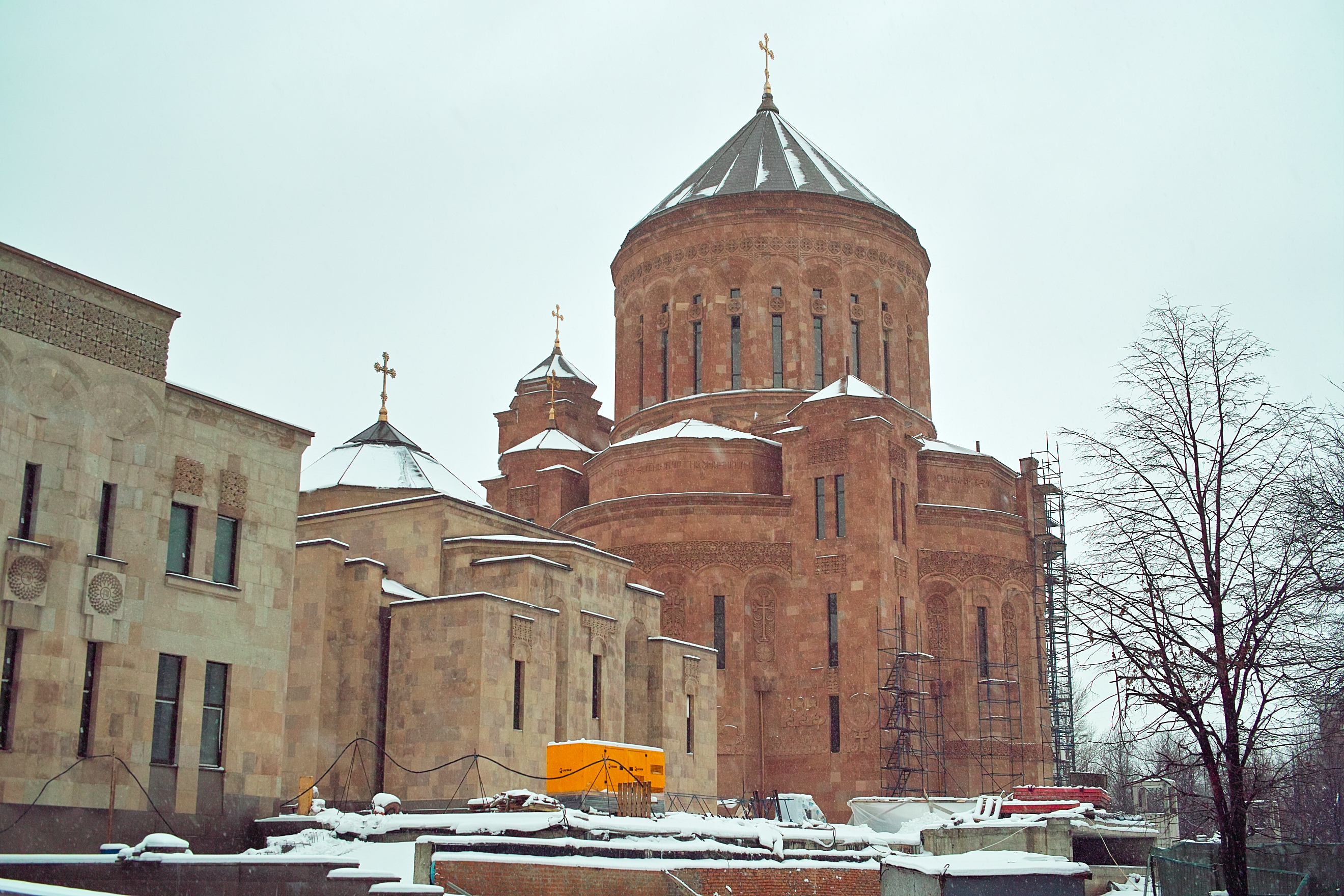
The Armenian Cathedral of Moscow, completed in 2011

The 2010 Russian census put the number of Moscow Armenians at 106,466. Another 63,306 Armenians lived in Moscow region at the time. There are various estimates on the number of Armenians in Moscow: 400,000, 600,000, 1,000,000. Moscow is often regarded as the largest Armenian community outside Armenia.

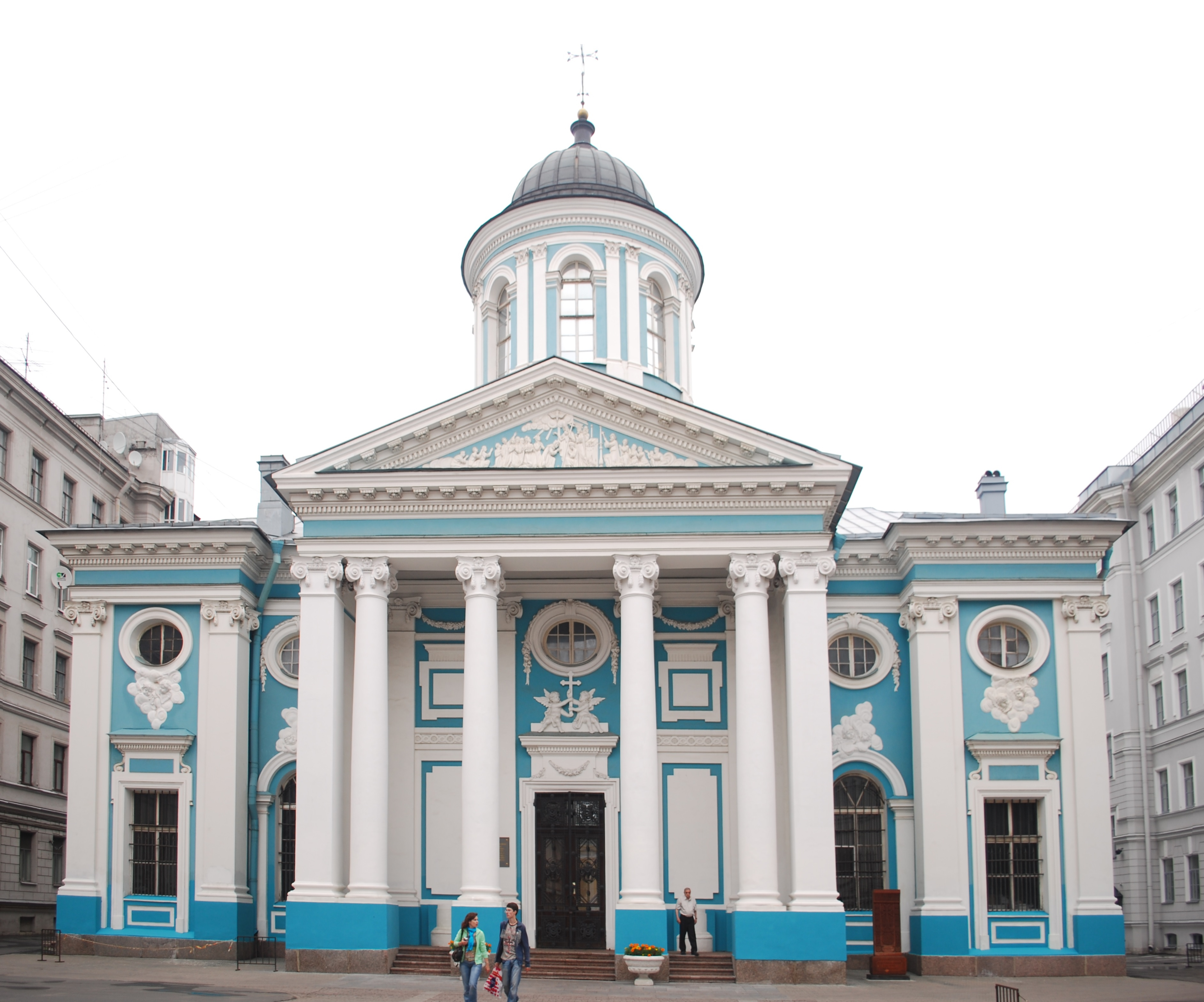
Saint Catherine's Armenian Church, Saint Petersburg

=== Saint Petersburg ===
In 1708 the first Armenians came to St. Petersburg, and in 1710 in the city already existed "Armenian offices". In 1730, under the leadership of the priest Ivan Sheristanova organized the first parish of the Armenian Apostolic Church. Throughout the 20th century Armenian population of St. Petersburg has been steadily increasing. The number of Armenians in St. Petersburg increased from 1,759 in 1926 to 19,164 in 2002.

According to Soviet 1989 census 47% Armenians speak Armenian as native language, 52% speak Russian as native language. At the same time almost all fluent in Russian language. About half of the Armenians have higher education and, consequently, higher social status.

According to the head of Saint Petersburg's Armenian community Karen Mkrtchyan, currently about 100,000 Armenians are living in the region of Saint Petersburg. There are 2 Armenian churches, a Sunday school, "Havatamk" Armenian monthly and a printing house.

=== Krasnodar ===
The Krasnodar Krai is one of the biggest communities of the Armenian diaspora. According to the Russian 2002 census, there were 274,566 Armenians. 211,397 of them spoke Armenian as their native language and 6,948 had Armenian citizenship.

According to estimates some 500,000, 700,000 or 1,000,000 Armenians resided in Krasnodar.

They are chiefly concentrated in Greater Sochi (80,045–125,000) the city of Krasnodar (28,022 (Note: 21,390 in the city itself and 6,632 in the municipality)–70,000), the city of Armavir (18,262–50,000) Tuapse (18,194) (Note: 5,335 in the city itself and 12,859 in the district), Novorossiysk (12,092–40,000) Apsheron (10,659), and Anapa (8,201).

=== Rostov-on-Don ===
Historically, the Don region was home to the largest Armenian community on the territory of the modern Russian Federation. Armenians were resettled from Crimean Khanate in 1779 by orders of Catherine the Great and founded several settlements around the territory of modern Rostov-on-Don. The largest of them, Nakhichevan-on-Don, was merged into the Rostov city in 1928. Armenians still constitute the majority (60%) of population in Myasnikovsky District. In 2010, Rostov-on-Don had the third largest Armenian population of all Russian cities (after Moscow and Sochi, Krasnodar Krai).

== Institutions ==
The Union of Armenians of Russia is a public organization founded in 2000 that unites Armenians in Russia and Russians of Armenian descent to strengthen the visibility of Armenians and Armenian culture in Russia. There are more than 700 regional and local branches of the union in Russia.

== Notable Russian Armenians ==
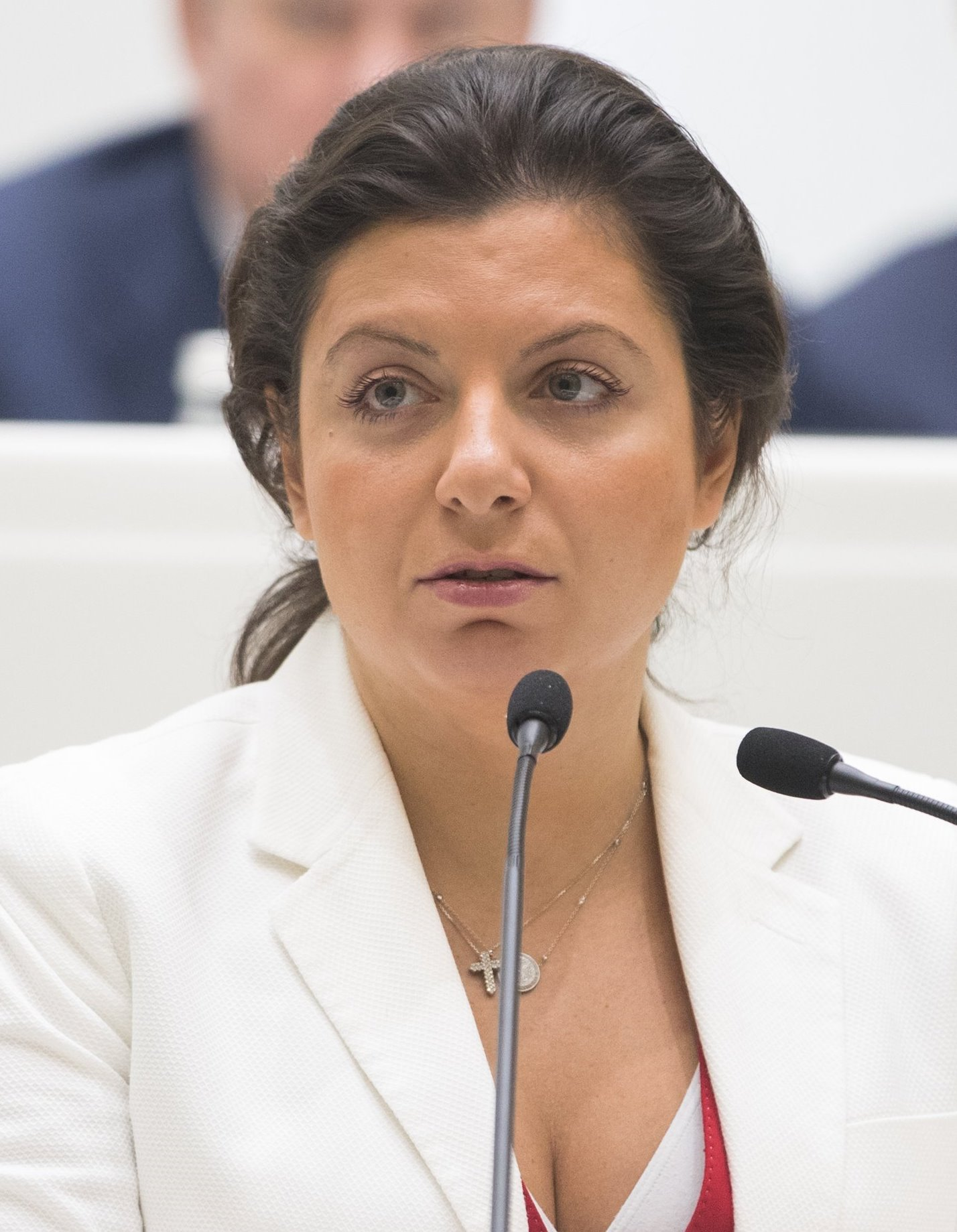
RT and Sputnik Editor-in-Chief Margarita Simonyan

=== Arts and entertainment ===
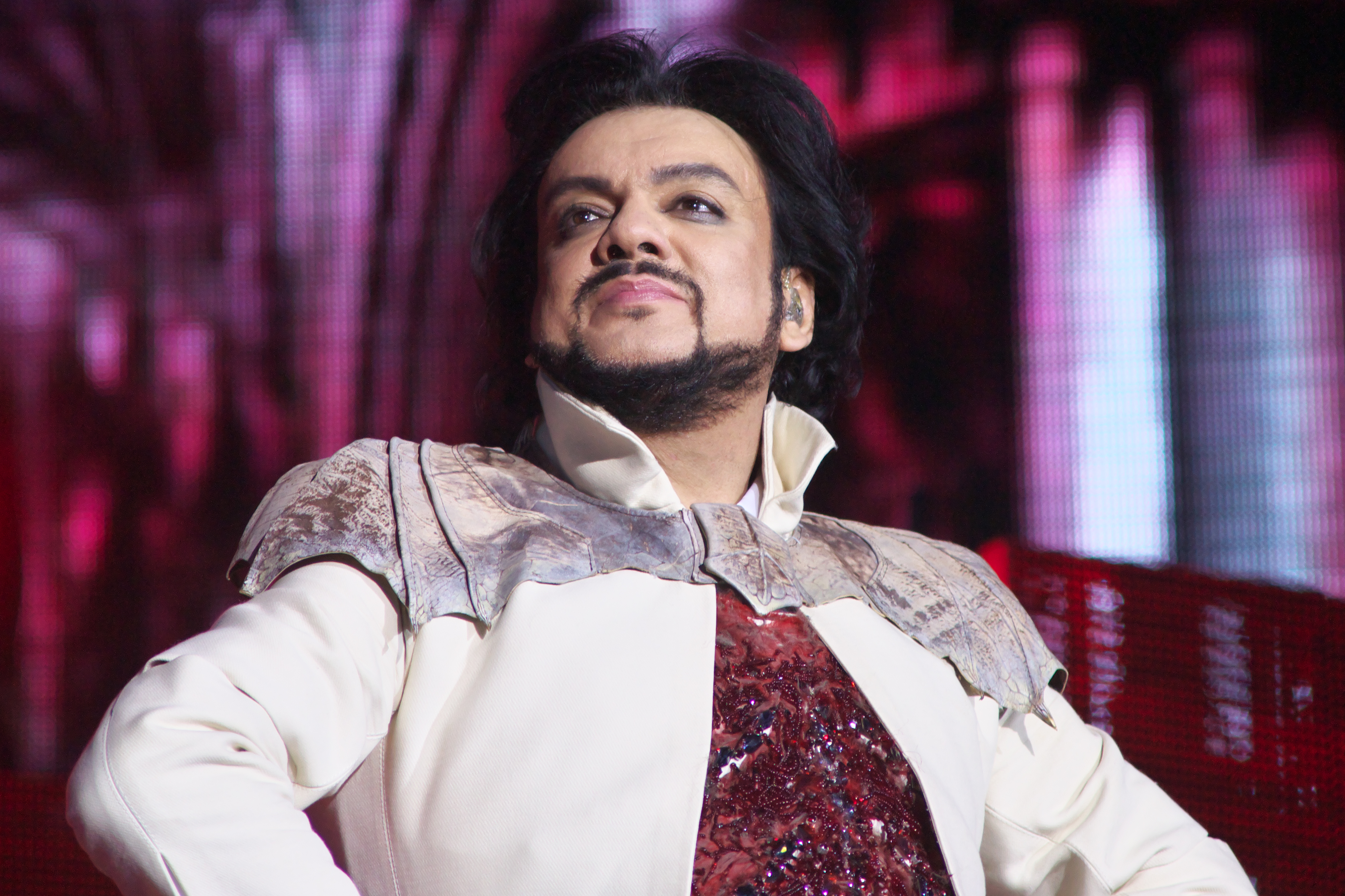
King of Russian pop Philipp Kirkorov

- Ivan Aivazovsky (1817–1900), painter, one of the greatest masters of marine art
- Yuri Kasparyan (b. 1963), former guitarist of Kino
- Irina Allegrova (b. 1952), pop singer
- Artsvik (b. 1984), pop singer
- Lev Atamanov (1905–1981), director of Soyuzmultfilm animation studio
- Arno Babajanian (1921–1983), composer and pianist
- Armen Dzhigarkhanyan (1935–2020), actor, appeared in more films than any other Russian actor
- Karina Evn (b. 1997), singer-songwriter
- Sergey Galoyan (b. 1981), music producer
- Mikhail Galustyan (b. 1979), comedian and showman
- Lousine Gevorkyan (b. 1982), rock singer
- Armen Grigoryan (b. 1960), singer-songwriter
- Luara Hayrapetyan (b. 1997), singer-songwriter
- Artur Janibekyan (b. 1976), co-producer of Comedy Club
- Karen Kavaleryan (b. 1961), lyricist of Eurovision songs
- Edmond Keosayan (1936–1994), film director
- Tigran Keosayan (1966-2025), film director, actor and writer
- Hamo Beknazarian - film director, actor, and screenwriter
- Aram Khachaturian (1903–1978), classical composer, one of the titans of Soviet classical music
- Dmitry Kharatyan (b. 1960), actor
- Philipp Kirkorov (b. 1967), singer, king of Russian pop
- Arshak Makichyan, violinist and activist who is called the Russian Greta Thunberg
- Garik Martirosyan (b. 1974), comedian, co-producer of Comedy Club
- Frunzik Mkrtchyan (1930–1993), actor
- Stas Namin (b. 1951), rock singer
- Levon Oganezov, pianist and conductor
- Sergei Parajanov (1924–1990), film director, significantly contributed to Soviet cinema
- Yevgeny Petrosyan (b. 1945), comedian
- Eva Rivas (b. 1987), pop singer, represented Armenia in Eurovision 2010
- Avraam Russo (b. 1969), pop singer
- Igor Sarukhanov (b. 1956), rock singer
- Martiros Saryan (1880–1972), painter
- Dmitry Nalbandyan (15 September 1906 – 2 July 1993), Soviet painter and animator
- Karen Shakhnazarov (b. 1952), filmmaker, producer, director of Mosfilm since 1998
- Mikael Tariverdiev (1931–1996), composer
- Akim Tamiroff (1899–1972), actor
- Agrippina Vaganova (1879–1951), ballet teacher
- Yevgeny Vakhtangov (1883–1922), actor and theatre director
- Eva Gevorgyan (b. 2004), Russian Armenian classical pianist
- Elena Grigoryants, (b. August 12, 1965, in Leningrad) culturologist, art critic, curator
- Koryun Nahapetyan - painter-nonconformist, sociologist, philosopher and public activist, a participant of the Bulldozer Exhibition
- Mariam Aslamazyan - Soviet painter
- Yeranuhi Aslamazyan - Soviet artist and graphic artist
- Artyom Kacher - rapper
- Roksana Babajan - Soviet and Russian pop singer and actress, People's Artist of the Russian Federation (1999)
- Karen Khachaturian - composer
- Vera Musaelyan - singer, musician, and songwriter
- ANIVAR - videoblogger and singer
- Mozee Montana - rapper
- Sergey Musaelyan - pianist
- Pavel Nersessian - pianist
- Kristina Si - singer
- Sevak Khanagyan - singer
- Svetlana Shmulyian - jazz vocalist, bandleader, producer, and educator
- Mikhail Simonyan - violinist
- Gayane Chebotaryan - composer
- Boris Abalyan - choir conductor
- Nina Ter-Osipyan - actress
- Yefim Kopelyan - actor
- Alexander Maysuryan - author and far-left political activist
- Ashot Sahratyan - poet
- Alexander Mirzayan - poet
- Karen Karagezyan - journalist, translator and writer

=== Medicine ===
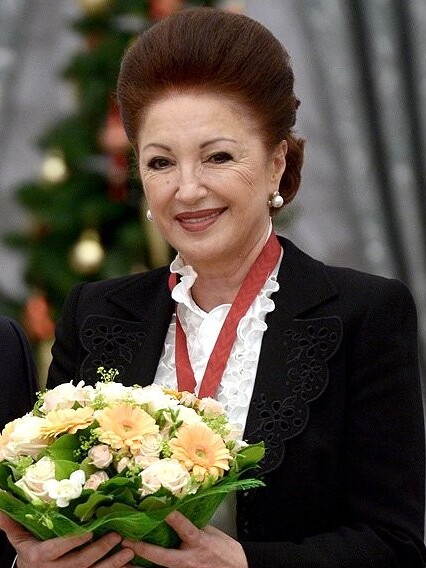
Chief obstetrician-gynecologist of the Russian Federation Leyla Adamyan

- Leyla Adamyan (b. 1949), Chief obstetrician-gynecologist of the Russian Federation

=== Politics and military ===
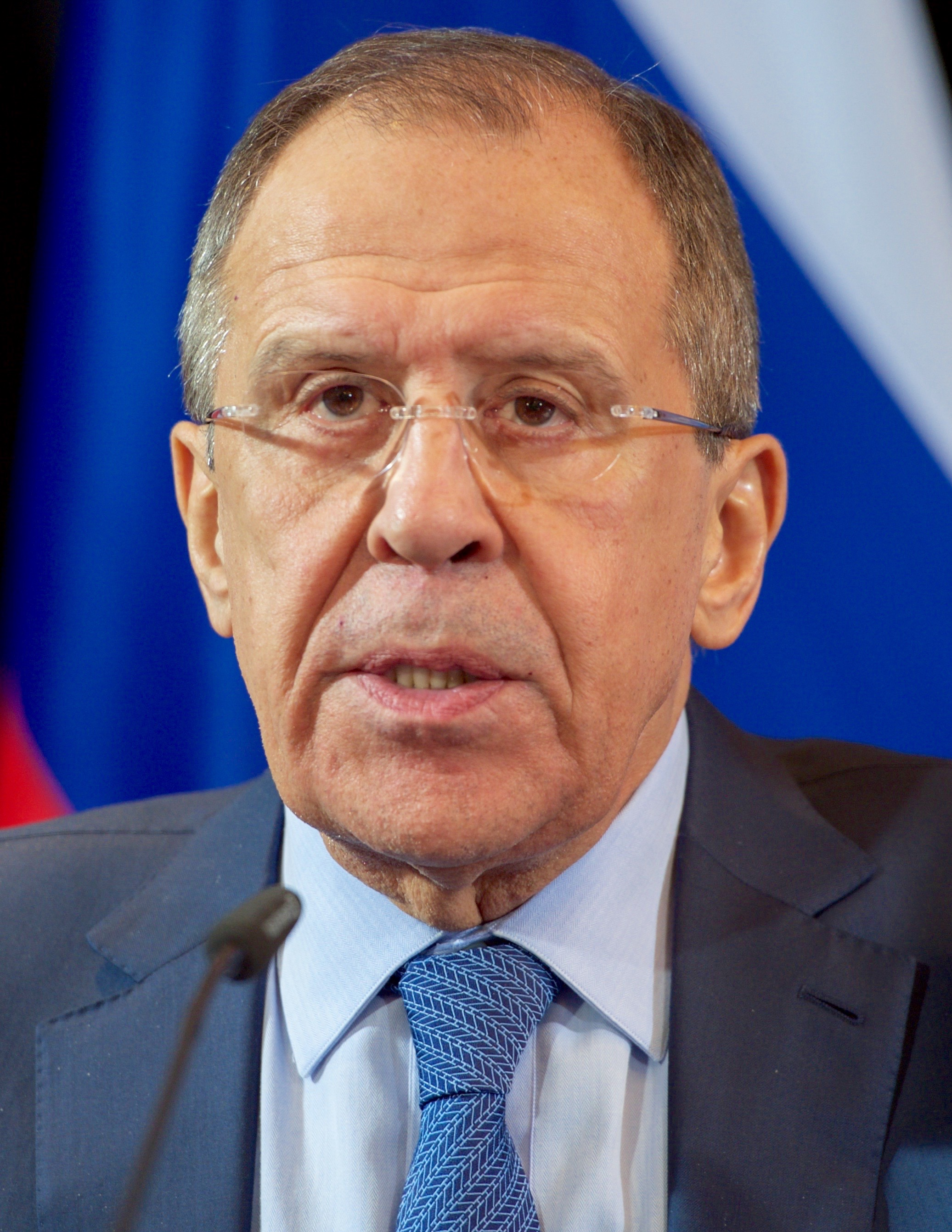
Russian Foreign Minister Sergey Lavrov

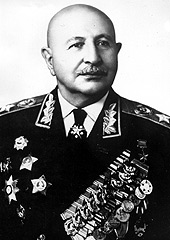
Marshal of the Soviet Union Ivan Bagramyan

- Sergey Aganov (1917–1996), Marshal of Engineer Troops
- Sergei Avakyants (b. 1957), Admiral, Commander of the Pacific Fleet
- Hamazasp Babadzhanian (1906–1977), Chief Marshal of the Armoured Forces, Soviet Tank Forces
- Roman Babayan (b. 1967), politician, journalist, TV presenter
- Ivan Bagramyan (1897–1982), Marshal of the Soviet Union
- Vasili Bebutov (1791–1858), Adjutant General of the H.I.M. Retinue, General of the Infantry
- Aleksandr Chupriyan (b. 1958), political military commander, interim Minister of Emergency Situations
- Ivan Isakov (1894–1967), Admiral of the Fleet of the Soviet Union, Soviet Navy
- Sergei Khudyakov (1902–1950), Marshal of Aviation, Soviet Air Force
- Sergey Kurginyan (b. 1949), political scientist
- Ivan Lazarev (1820–1879), Lieutenant General of the Imperial Russian Army
- Sergey Lavrov (b. 1950), Foreign Minister of Russia since 2004
- Mikhail Loris-Melikov (1825–1888), General of the Cavalry, Minister of Interior of Russia in 1880–1881
- Valerian Madatov (1782–1829), prince, a Lieutenant-General of the Russian Empire
- Karen Mikaelyan (b. 1932), diplomat and civic leader
- Anastas Mikoyan (1895–1978), Soviet statesman and diplomat, First Deputy Chairman of the Council of Ministers of the Soviet Union (second highest figure in the Soviet Union) from 1955 to 1964
- Gaik Ovakimian (1898–1967), leading Soviet NKVD spy in the United States
- Movses Silikyan (1862–1937), Major General in the Russian Imperial Army
- Nelson Stepanyan (1913–1944), dive bomber pilot during WWII, two times hero of USSR
- Gevork Vartanian (1924–2012), legendary Soviet spy
- Saak Karapetyan (1960–2018), Russian Deputy Attorney General
- Ruben Yesayan - test pilot
- Aramas Dallakyan - Senator from the Chukotka Autonomous Okrug on legislative authority from 2015 to 2021
- Mikayel Nalbandian - writer, poet, political theorist and activist
- Grigory Khakhanyan - Soviet komkor (corps commander)
- Gaspar Voskanyan - Soviet komkor (corps commander)
- Hmayak Babayan - Red Army major general and a Hero of the Soviet Union
- Hunan Avetisyan - Soviet senior sergeant from the 89th Rifle Division who sacrificed his life by covering the embrasure of a German machine gun pillbox with his body so that his fellow soldiers could keep moving against the enemy in the Novorossiysk-Taman Operation of the Battle of the Caucasus
- Tovmas Nazarbekian - general in the Russian Imperial Caucasus Army
- Avetis Nazarbekian - revolutionary
- Igor Kagramanyan - senator from Yaroslavl Oblast from 2017 to 2020

=== Scientists ===
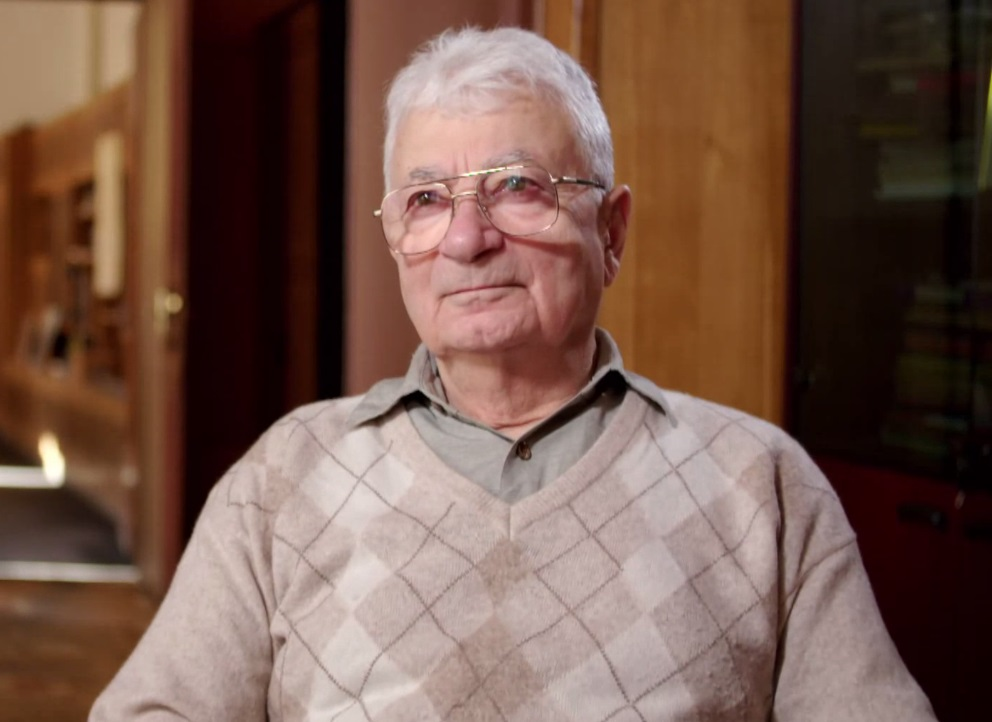
Nuclear physicist Yuri Oganessian

- Evgeny Abramyan (1930–2014), physicist, one of the founders of several research directions in the Soviet and Russian nuclear technology
- Hovannes Adamian (1879–1932), engineer, one of the founders of color television
- Sergei Adian (1931–2020), one of the most prominent Soviet mathematicians
- Tateos Agekian (1913–2006), astrophysicist, a pioneer of stellar dynamics
- Sos Alikhanian (1906–1985), geneticist, one of the founders of molecular genetics in the USSR, founder of the State Research Institute of Genetics (GosNIIgenetika)
- Abram Alikhanov (1904–1970), nuclear physicist, one of the founders of nuclear physics in USSR, founder of Institute for Theoretical and Experimental Physics (ITEP)
- Victor Ambartsumian (1908–1996), astrophysicist, one of the founders of theoretical astrophysics
- Gurgen Askaryan (1928–1997), physicist, inventor of light self focusing
- Boris Babayan (b. 1933), computer scientist, father of supercomputing in the former Soviet Union and Russia, founder of Moscow Center of SPARC Technologies (MCST)
- Mikhail Chailakhyan (1902–1991), founder of hormonal theory of plant development
- Artur Chilingarov (1939–2024), polar explorer, member of the State Duma from 1993 to 2011
- Amo Elyan (1903–1965), major general of engineering, head of the KB-1 which created the first anti-aircraft missile defense system S-25 Berkut
- Bagrat Ioannisiani (1911–1985), designer of the BTA-6, one of the largest telescopes in the world
- Andronik Iosifyan (1905–1993), aerospace engineer, chief electrician of Soviet missiles and spacecraft, including the R-7 Semyorka and the Soyuz spacecraft
- Alexander Kemurdzhian (1921–2003), aerospace engineer, designer of the first space exploration rovers for moon and mars
- Leonid Khachiyan (1952–2005), mathematician and computer scientist, known for ellipsoid algorithm
- Tigran Khudaverdyan (b. 1981), computer scientist, deputy CEO of Yandex
- Artem Mikoyan (1905–1970), aerospace engineer, designed many of the famous MiG jet aircraft, founder of Mikoyan Design Bureau
- Semyon Kirlian (1898–1978), founder of Kirlian photography; discovered that living matter is emitting energy fields
- Ivan Knunyants (1906–1990), chemist, a major developer of the Soviet chemical weapons program
- Samvel Kocharyants (1909–1993), nuclear scientist, developer of nuclear warheads for ballistic missiles
- Sergey Mergelyan (1928–2008), mathematician, made major contributions to the Approximation Theory
- Yuri Oganessian (b. 1933), nuclear physicist in the Joint Institute for Nuclear Research (JINR), the world's leading researcher in superheavy elements
- Artem Oganov (b. 1975), crystallographer, mineralogist, chemist, physicist, and materials scientist
- Leon Orbeli (1882–1958), founder of evolutionary physiology
- Yuri Osipyan (1931–2008), physicist who worked in the field of solid state physics
- Mikhail Pogosyan (b. 1956), aerospace engineer, general director of Sukhoi and the United Aircraft Corporation (UAC)
- Lev Shaumyan (1904–1971), academic, first deputy editor-in-chief of the Great Soviet Encyclopedia
- Tatyana Shaumyan (b. 1938), orientalist, head of the Center for Indian Studies at the Institute of Oriental Studies of the Russian Academy of Sciences
- Alexei Sisakian (1944–2010), theoretical physicist, director of JINR from 2006–2010
- Norair Sisakian (1907–1966), biochemist, a founder of space biology; pioneer in biochemistry of sub-cell structures and technical biochemistry
- Anahit Ananyan - Soviet agronomist who developed tomato cultivars
- Karen Ter-Martirosian (1922–2005), theoretical physicist, known for his contributions to quantum mechanics and quantum field theory, founder of the Elementary Particle Physics chair of the MIPT
- Armen Takhtajan (10 June 1910 – 13 November 2009), Soviet botanist, one of the most important figures in 20th century plant evolution and systematics and biogeography
- Anahit Perikhanian (24 April 1928 – 27 May 2012), Soviet academic,an Iranologist, Perikhanian specialized in Sasanian jurisprudence, history and society
- Ruben Aganbegyan (born 1972 in Novosibirsk), economist
- Abel Aganbegyan (born 8 October 1932), leading Soviet economist, a full member of the Russian Academy of Sciences
- Levon Chailakhyan - physiologist, biophysicist, and embryologist, also a member of the Russian Academy of Sciences
- Armen Sarvazyan - biophysicist and entrepreneur
- Sofya Georgiyevna Tamamshyan - Soviet botanist and plant taxonomist noted for describing 7 genera and more than 50 species, and for authoring over 120 works
- Leon Petrosyan - professor of Applied Mathematics and the Head of the Department of Mathematical Game theory and Statistical Decision Theory at the St. Petersburg University
- Nikolai Ardelyan - mathematician, Professor, Dr.Sc., Honored Scientist of the Moscow State University, Leading Researcher of the MSU Faculty of Computational Mathematics and Cybernetics
- Leon Takhtajan - Soviet mathematical physicist
- Artem Alikhanian - Soviet physicist
- Joseph Hakobyan - scientist, an expert on missiles development, was the Deputy General of the Moscow Research Institute
- Ashot Sarkisov - scientist who worked with nuclear submarine technology, nuclear safety and decommissioning of nuclear facilities
- Karapet Agadzhanian - psychiatrist, neurologist and neuroanatomist
- Andranik Migranyan - political scientist, who works as a professor at the Moscow State Institute of International Relations
- Georgi Derluguian - sociologist and historian
- Stepan Kechekjan - lawyer, historian and a specialist in the field of history and theory of state and law and history of political and legal doctrines
- Aksel Vartanyan - sports historian

=== Sports ===
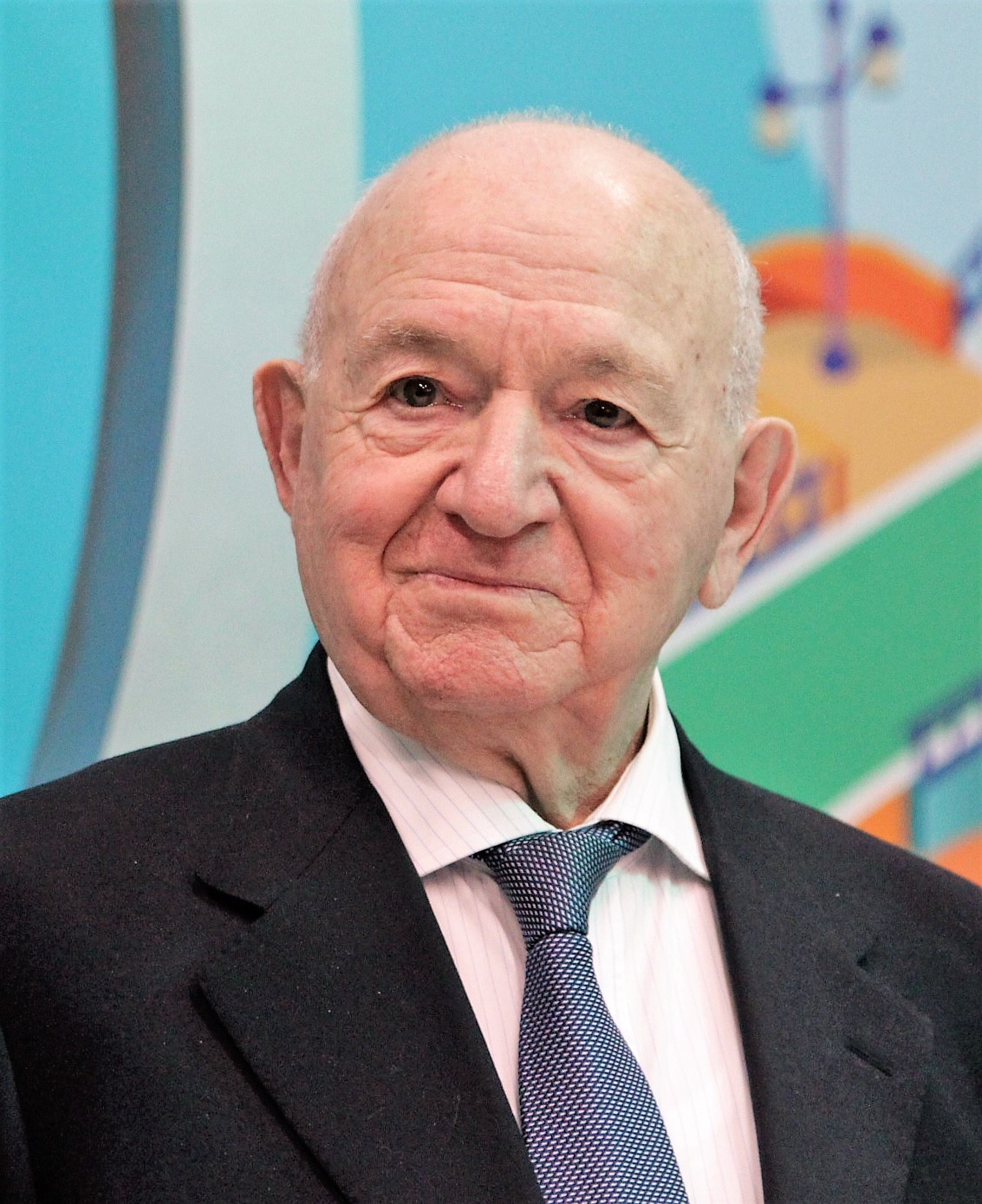
First vice-president of Russian Football Union Nikita Simonyan

- Artur Dalaloyan (b. 1996), artistic gymnast, 2018 World All-Around Champion
- Artur Danielian (b. 2003), 2018 World Junior silver medalist, men's singles figure skater
- Yana Egorian (b. 1993), 2016 Olympic Champion in women's individual sabre
- Robert Emmiyan (b. 1965), fourth best long jumper in history, holder of European record
- Arsen Galstyan (b. 1989), judoka, 2012 Olympic champion
- Margarita Gasparyan (b. 1994), singles tennis player
- Karen Khachanov, (b. 1996), singles tennis player
- Evgenia Medvedeva (b. 1999), 2018 Olympic silver medalist, 2 time World Champion, ladies' singles figure skater (father's side)
- Grigory Mkrtychan (1925–2003), ice hockey player and coach, 1956 Olympic champion
- Samvel Mnatsyan (5 March 1990 – 6 October 2019), professional ice hockey defenceman
- Erast Osipyan (born 1965), footballer
- Nikita Simonyan (1926–2025), football player and coach, first vice-president of the Russian Football Union (RFS)
- Seda Tutkhalyan (b. 1999), artistic gymnast, 2016 Olympic team silver medalist
- Hachatur Stepanyan (b.1985), volleyball player
- Yurik Vardanyan (1956–2018), weightlifter, set several world records
- Akop Stepanyan (b. 1986), mixed martial artist
- Arman Tsarukyan (b.1996), mixed martial artist, submission grappler, and freestyle wrestler
- Arsen Zakharyan (b. 2003), footballer
- Ruslan Koryan (b.1988), footballer
- Araik Ovsepyan (b.1995), footballer
- Albert Mnatsakanyan (b.1999), footballer
- Arthur Stepanyan (b.1987), footballer
- Armen Stepanyan (born 30 January 1974), football manager and a former player
- Kalin Stepanyan, professional football coach and a player
- Edgar Sevikyan (b.2001), footballer
- Pavel Dalaloyan - football player
- Arsen Balayan - football manager and a former player
- Karen Oganyan (born 25 June 1982), footballer
- Arsen Oganesyan (born 17 June 1990), football
- Stepan Oganesyan (born 28 September 2001), football player
- Pavel Sukosyan (born 14 January 1962), handball player
- Aleksandr Tumasyan (footballer)
- Denis Tumasyan (born 24 April 1985), football coach
- Sergei Tumasyan (born 31 January 1990),former professional footballer who played as a midfielder
- Sergey Petrosyan (1988-2017) weightlifter
- Narek Oganian (born 16 May 1997), Greco-Roman wrestler
- Vladimir Modosyan (born 16 June 1958), Soviet Freestyle wrestler
- David Oganisyan (born 12 May 1994), sambo and judo practitioner
- Aleksan Nalbandyan - amateur boxer
- Iurik Ogannisian (born 5 August 2002), karateka
- Armen Petrosyan (fighter)
- Georgy Nadzharyan - Paralympic footballer who won a silver medal at the 2008 Summer Paralympics in China
- Eduard Lusikyan - football player
- Yeghia Yavruyan - footballer
- Robert Zebelyan - footballer who played as a forward
- Mnatsakan Iskandaryan - Greco-Roman wrestler who competed for the Soviet Union and Russia
- Anzhela Gasparian - judoka
- Erdzhanik Avetisyan - sport shooter, specializing in the skeet shootings event
- Margarita Mkrtchyan - taekwondo practitioner, who competed in the women's featherweight category
- Ani Palian, paralimpic swimmer

=== Miscellaneous ===
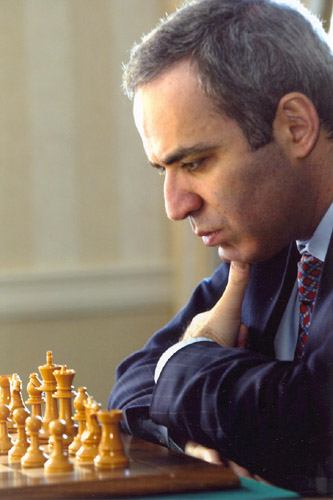
World chess champion Garry Kasparov

- Ara Abrahamyan (b. 1957), businessman
- Ruben Dishdishyan (b. 1959), entrepreneur
- Gabriel El-Registan (1899–1945), poet, co-author of the Anthem of the Soviet Union
- Pavel Florensky (1882–1937), orthodox theologian, philosopher, mathematician, electrical engineer, and inventor
- Sergey Galitsky (b. 1967), businessman, founder and co-owner of Magnit, Russia's largest retailer
- Sergo Grigorian (b. 1961), art collector, known for his collection of Soviet political posters
- Karo Halabyan (1897–1959), architect, executive secretary of Union of Soviet Architects
- Garry Kasparov (b. 1963), world chess champion, considered by many to be the greatest chess player of all time
- Stefan Pogosyan - chess International Master
- David Paravyan - chess player
- Rudik Makarian - chess grandmaster
- Sergey Grigoriants - chess player
- Yury Dokhoian - Grandmaster of chess
- Miron Merzhanov (1895–1975), personal architect of Joseph Stalin
- Tigran Petrosian (1929–1984), chess grandmaster, world chess champion from 1963 to 1969
- Photios I of Constantinople (810–893), orthodox patriarch, central figure in the Christianization of Kievan Rus', one of the founders of the Russian Orthodox Church
- Margarita Simonyan (b. 1980), journalist, editor-in-chief of the television news network RT (Russia Today)
- Artyom Tarasov (1950–2017), businessman, first millionaire in the USSR
- Garegin Tosunyan (b. 1955), banker, president of Association of Russian Banks
- Ruben Vardanyan (b. 1968), businessman, CEO of Troika Dialog
- Sergey Mikaelyan - Soviet film director and winner of the USSR State Prize (1976)
- Albert Avdolyan - investor, businessman and philanthropist
- Armen Sargsyan - gangster and businessman

== See also ==
- Armenia–Russia relations
- List of Armenian churches in Russia
- Russians in Armenia
- Armeno-Tats

== Bibliography ==
- Harutyunyan, Yuri (2010). "Об этносоциологических исследованиях армян России [On Ethnosociological Studies of Armenians in Russia]". Patma-Banasirakan Handes (in Russian) (1): 129–136.
