= Stepan Kechekjan =

Stepan Fyodorovich Kechekjan
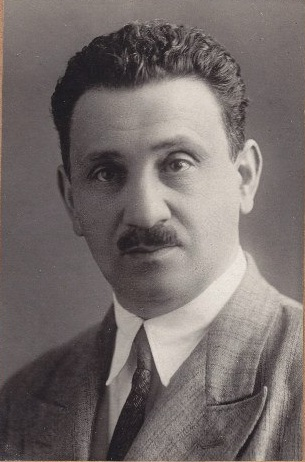
- Born: Stepan Fyodorovich Kechekjan; Степан Фёдорович Кечекьян; 25 March 1890; Nakhichevan-on-Don
- Died: 24 June 1967 (aged 77); Moscow
- Occupations: lawyer, historian

Stepan Fyodorovich Kechekjan (Russian: Степан Фёдорович Кечекьян; 25 March 1890, Nakhichevan-on-Don – 24 June 1967, Moscow) was a Russian-Armenian lawyer, historian and a specialist in the field of history and theory of state and law and history of political and legal doctrines. Professor, Doctor of Law Sciences. Honoured Scientist of the RSFSR.

== Biography ==
Stepan Fyodorovich Kechekjan was born in Nakhichevan-on-Don in the family of a doctor.

In 1912 he graduated from the Faculty of Law of Moscow University. His first work was the monograph "Ethical worldview of Spinoza" (1914). In 1915, after passing the Masters of Law exam, he became a Privat-docent in Moscow University; at the same time he taught at the People's University of Nizhny Novgorod.

In 1918–1919 he was Professor and Dean of the Faculty of Social Sciences of Saratov University. In 1920–1921, after moving to his native city, Rostov-on-Don, he became a professor at the Don University and the Don Institute of National Economy.

In 1922 he returned to Moscow and began teaching at Prechisten Practical Institute and at the State Institute of Word. In 1928 he left for Baku. He was one of the organizers of the Law Faculty of Baku State University, where he was elected Professor of the Department of International law; there he published a number of works on international law. In 1930–1931 he was a professor of the Institute of Soviet Construction and Law under the Party's Central Executive Committee of Azerbaijan SSR.

In 1931, Kechekjan finally returned to Moscow and from that time his work was connected with city's universities and scientific institutions; Only one academic year (1937–1938) he taught at Sverdlovsk Juridical Institute. In 1934–1947 he was a professor at Moscow Law Institute. In 1937–1944 he worked at the All-Union Correspondence Legal Academy, the All-Union Institute of Law Sciences, the Historical and Archival Institute, and also at the All-Union Legal Correspondence Institute, where he headed a department.

Professor of the Academy of Social Sciences under the CPSU Central Committee (1946–1954) and MGIMO (1948–1953, head of a department since 1949). In addition to his scientific activity, Stepan Kechekjan was engaged in practical activity: in the 1920s–1930s, he consulted the board of the Moscow-Kursk Railroad, the Department of International Settlements of the USSR People's Commissariat of Finance, and also headed the legal group of the All-Union Union of Artificial Fibers of the People's Commissariat of Industry of the USSR.

In 1939 he defended his doctoral dissertation "Socio-political views of Aristotle", which was subsequently revised and published in 1947 in the form of a monograph "Theory of Aristotle on the state and law".

In 1940–1959 he was a research fellow at the Institute of State and Law of the USSR Academy of Sciences, where he was in charge of the Department of history of state and law.

In 1942, after the re-creation of the Faculty of Law of Moscow State University, he became a Professor there. In 1954 he took up the post of the Head of the Department of History of State and Law, which he headed until his death.

He died on 24 June 1967 after a short illness. He was buried at Moscow Armenian Cemetery.

=== Scientific work ===
Kechekjan studied the history of political and legal doctrines, the history of the state and law of foreign countries, the theory of state and law, and international law. He was the author of more than 160 scientific works, including a number of monographs and textbooks for universities, many of which have been translated into German, French, English, Polish, Spanish, Japanese, Czech, Slovak, Hungarian, Bulgarian and other languages. He was one of the main editors of the fundamental textbook on the history of political doctrines, written by the joint author's collective of the Moscow State University and the Institute of State and Law of the USSR Academy of Sciences (1955, 2nd ed., 1960). He participated in the creation of curricula and textbooks on the general history of the state and law (1944, 1949, 1963), the theory of state and law (1949, 1962), administrative law (1940). He made a major contribution to the development of the theory of sources of law and the general doctrine of legal relations, proposed a new interpretation of a number of texts by Aristotle, Spinoza and other classics of political philosophy.
