= Popov Mansion =

- Особняк Попова
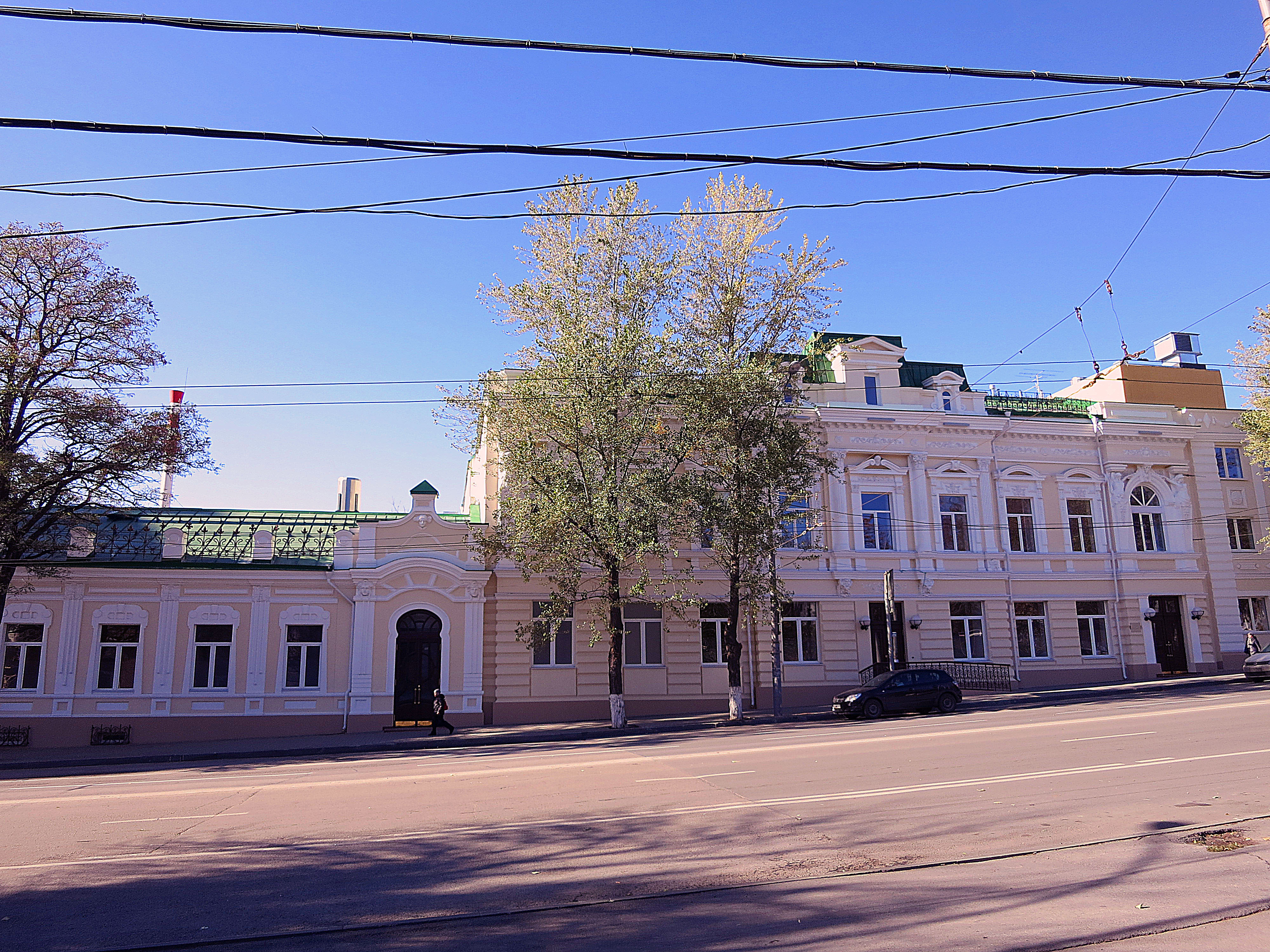
- 47°13′46″N 39°45′43″E
- Location: House 8, Karl Marx Square, Rostov-on-Don
- Beginning date: 1890
- Completion date: 1891

The Popov Mansion (Russian: Особняк Попова) is a building in Rostov-on-Don located on Karl Marx Square. The house was built in 1890 — 1891 and belonged to the landowner and cattle dealer Lusegen Popov. In 1928, a maternity hospital was housed in the mansion. It closed for reconstruction in 2012, and reopened in 2014. The Popov Mansion has the status of an object of cultural heritage of regional significance.

== History ==
The two-storey mansion was built in 1890 — 1891 on the central square of the city of Nakhichevan-on-Don (now part of Proletarsky District, Rostov-on-Don). The house belonged to the well-known landowner and cattle dealer Lusegen Popov. The architect Nikolai Durbakh is believed to have designed the mansion. The ground floor of the mansion was rented by various offices and shops, while the owner's apartments were on the upper floor.

According to data for 1907 and 1916, the building belonged to Manuk Mikhaylovich Popov, the heir of the first owner of the mansion. Manuk Mikhaylovich was actively involved in trade and commercial activities and was a well-known philanthropist in the city.

In 1920 the military revolutionary committee was housed in the mansion. In 1928 a maternity hospital was opened in the building. During the Great Patriotic War, during the occupation of Rostov, three female doctors remained in the maternity hospital. In the cellar, they equipped a delivery room in the cellar, where they attended to women in labour. After the war, the maternity hospital was renovated and reopened. In 2012 the maternity hospital was closed for reconstruction. It was re-opened after renovation in 2014 and is currently operating.

== Description ==
The Popov Mansion is built in the eclectic style, combining elements of baroque and classicism. The architectural and artistic composition of the facade is determined by the central and side braces, crowned with attics. The ground floor of the building is rusticated, the upper floor is finished with stucco and decorative plaster. The portals of the side windows have semicircular ends with capstones in the form of female heads. The archivolts of these windows are supported by figures of atlantes and caryatids. The walls of the central part of the facade are decorated with semi-columns and pilasters of the composite order. Above the main entrance there was originally a balcony with a canopy (dismantled in the 1930s). The frieze over the windows is decorated by cartouches and floral ornaments. The mezzanine rises above the central layer.

The building has a corridor planning system with two-sided rooms. The mansion was distinguished by its rich interior decoration, little of which has survived to the present. A two-flight marble staircase led from the central lobby to the upper floor. In the central part of the upper floor was a hall, adjoined by a drawing room, dining room, study and living rooms. The walls of the rooms were decorated with pilasters, the ceiling was decorated with stucco elements. On its west side, the Popov Mansion adjoins the former Armenian magistrate's building.

== Literature ==
- Yesaulov, G. V.; Chernitsyna, V. A. (2002). Архитектурная летопись Ростова-на-Дону (2 ed.). Rostov-on-Don. ISBN 5-8456-0489-3.
