= Moscow Armenian Cemetery =

Cemetery in Moscow

- Армянское Ваганьковское кладбище Մոսկվայի Հայկական Գերեզմանատուն
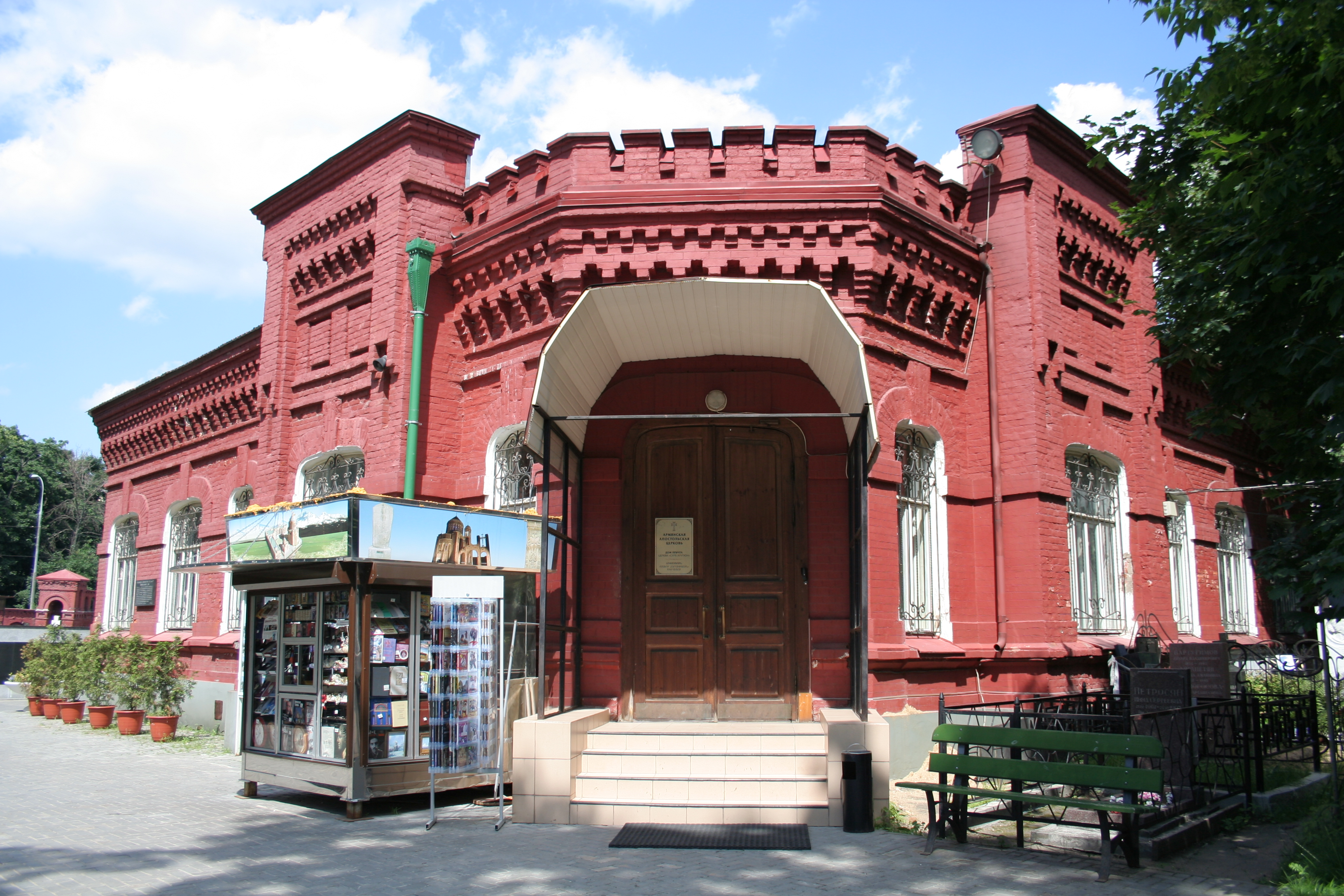
- Interactive map of Moscow Armenian Cemetery

Details
- Established: 1805
- Location: Moscow
- Country: Russia
- Coordinates: 55°45′59″N 37°33′13″E
- Size: 17 hectares (42 acres)
- No. of graves: 10,000 +

The Armenian Cemetery of Moscow (Armenian: Մոսկվայի Հայկական Գերեզմանատուն, Russian: Армя́нское Вага́ньковское кла́дбище, Armyanskoe Vagan'kovskoe kladbishche) is an Armenian historical cemetery in Moscow, Russia.

== History ==
The cemetery was established in 1804 by the initiative of Minas Lazarev, the leader of Moscow's Armenian community, who also initiated the construction of the Surb Harutyun Armenian church (1808–1815).

== Description ==
The cemetery is located in the Krasnaya Presnya (Красная Пресня) district, not far from Vagankovo Cemetery.

The Lazarev family crypt is located under the church.

The cemetery and the church are under state protection. Among the state-protected monuments are the obelisk on A.A. Loris-Melikov's tomb (1844), Ananov's tombs (constructed by medieval Armenian canons), khachkar on D.S. Melik-Beglyarov's tomb (1913), and the modernist gravestone for Nikolai Tarasov sculpted by Nikolai Andreev. The Armenian Cemetery is also the resting place for the remains of people who were not of Armenian descent.

== Burials at Armenian Cemetery of Moscow ==
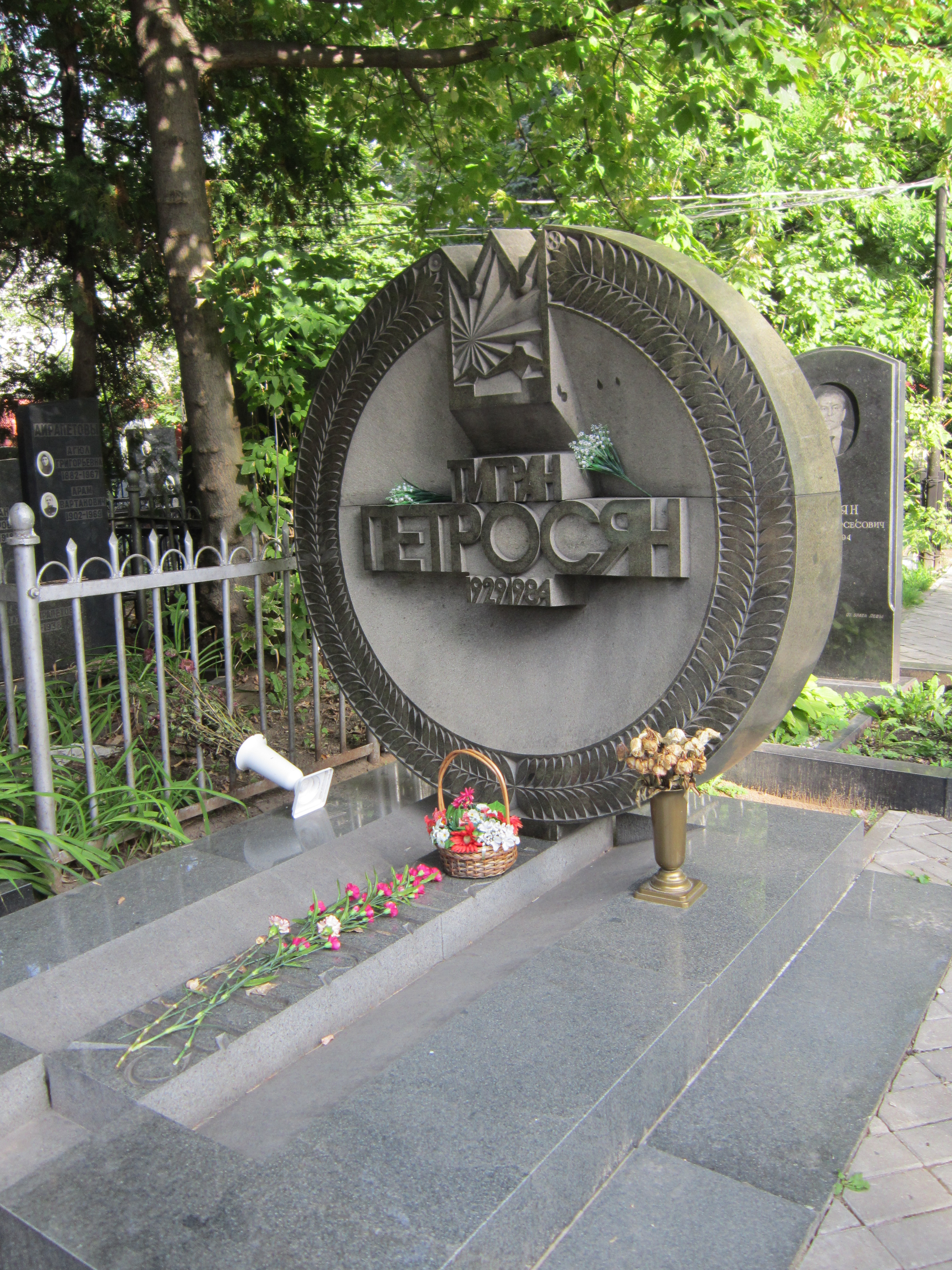
Tigran Petrosian's Grave

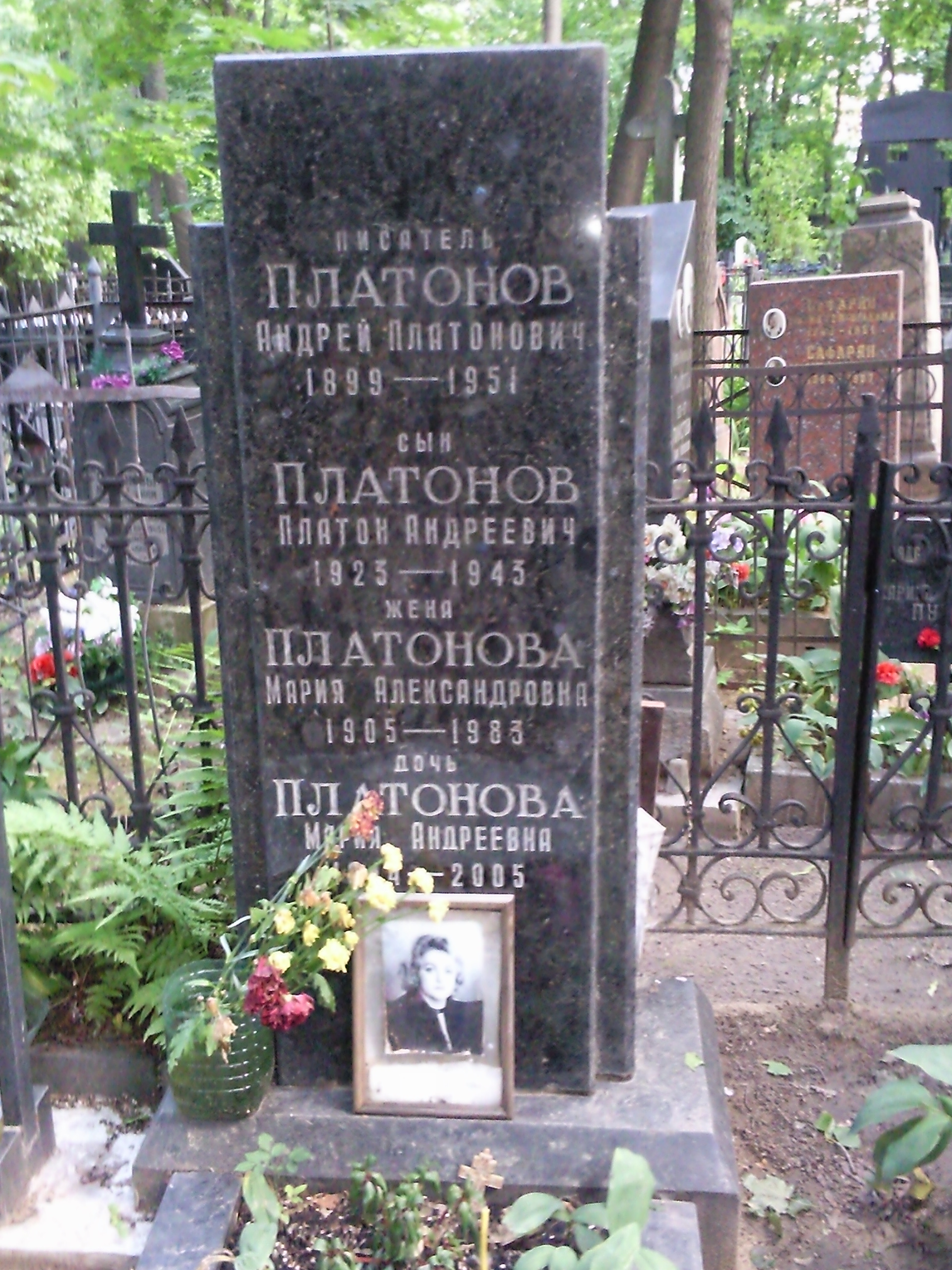
Andrei Platonov's grave at Armenian Cemetery

- Sergey Aslamazian (1897–1978), cellist, composer
- Hamo Beknazarian (1891–1965), film director
- Mikhail Chailakhyan (1901–1991), botanist
- Zara Dolukhanova (1918–2007), opera singer
- Alexey Dushkin (1904–1977), architect
- Ivan Lazarev (1820–1879), lieutenant general
- Pavel Lisitsian (1911–2004), opera singer
- Koryun Nahapetyan (1926–1999), painter-nonconformist and public activist
- Stepanos Nazarian (1812–1879), publisher, historian of literature and orientalist
- Kerope Patkanov (1833–1889), orientalist, researcher, professor
- Tigran Petrosian (1929–1984), World Chess Champion from 1963 to 1969
- Andrei Platonov (1899–1951), Russian writer
- Leonid Ramzin (1887–1948), Russian thermal engineer
- Nadezhda Rumyantseva (1930–2008), theatrical and cinema actress
- Marietta Shaginyan (1888–1982), Russian writer
- Smbat Shahaziz (1840–1908), Armenian poet, educator, writer
- Mikael Tariverdiev (1931–1996), composer
- Boris Tchaikovsky (1925–1996), composer
