= Karapet Agadzhanian =

Psychiatrist (1876–1955)

Karapet Sarkisovich Agadzhanian
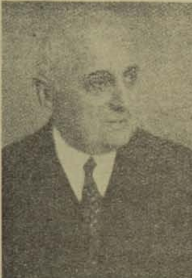
- Born: Կարապետ Սարգսի Աղաջանյան; Карапет Саркисович Агаджанянц; 1876; Tiflis
- Died: 15 December 1955 (aged 78–79); Paris
- Occupation: psychiatrist

Karapet Sarkisovich Agadzhanian (Armenian: Կարապետ Սարգսի Աղաջանյան; Russian: Карапет Саркисович Агаджанянц; 5 July 1876, Tiflis — 15 December 1955, Paris) was a Russian-Armenian psychiatrist, neurologist and neuroanatomist.

== Biography ==
Karapet Sarkisovich Agadzhanian was born in the family of an archpriest of the Armenian Gregorian Church. In 1896 he graduated from the 1st Tiflis Gymnasium. In 1901 he graduated with honors from the Medical Faculty of the Imperial Military Medical Academy in St. Petersburg. He was an apprentice, and later one of the associates of Vladimir Bekhterev.

In 1904 he defended his doctoral dissertation: "On the cortical center of view." In 1905, he became a laboratory assistant at the Clinic for the Mental and Nervous Diseases of the Academy; from 1906 — assistant, and since 1909 — privat-docent of the Clinic for the Mental and Nervous Diseases at St. Petersburg Women's Medical Institute.

In 1910 he trained in Berlin, where he studied neuroanatomy under the guidance of the German neurologist Luis Jacobson-Lask. After returning to Russia, he worked at Mikhailovsky Hospital in Tiflis. In 1911 he was appointed Director of the Physiotherapeutic polyclinic of the St. Petersburg Psychoneurological Institute. He was a member of the Committee of the St. Petersburg Psychoneurological Institute and read the course lectures about nervous diseases. From November 1913 to January 1915 he was a professor at the Department of Psychiatry of the University of Warsaw, and after the evacuation of the University to Rostov-on-Don, he continued his work at Rostov University. In 1915 he appointed a consultant on nerve diseases on the Southern Front.

In 1920 he emigrated to Turkey; from 1922 he taught at the University of Constantinople. In 1924 he moved to France. In 1924–1929 he was a member, then a member of the board, and from 1937–1948, chairman and honorary chairman of the Society of Russian Physicians named after Mechnikov in France. In 1928 he defended a thesis for a doctorate in medicine at the University of Paris. In 1931–1934 he worked at the Russian ambulance department of the Red Cross in Paris, from 1934 he worked at the Russian ambulance named after V. I. Temkin. Since 1933 he was a member of the Group of Russian Academicians (Groupe Académique Russe) in Paris. In 1950 he was elected chairman of the Union of Russian Armenians in France.

He was Secretary-General of the Committee for Assistance to the Union of Russian Military Disabled (1930s), and a founding member of the Parisian Masonic Lodge "Free Russia" (1931), member of the Lodge "North Star" (1926-1934) (Grand Orient de France).

He died in Paris in 1955.

== Works ==
- О корковом зрительном центре. — СПб.: Тип. Н. Н. Клобукова, 1904.
- Роль психотерапии в дерматологии: Сообщено на IX Пирог. съезде. — СПб.: тип. Я. Трей, 1904.
- Über das kortikale Sehzentrum. Neurologisches Centralblatt 25, s. 1017, 1904
- Ueber den Einfluss des Adrenalins auf das in Leber und Muskeln enthaltende Glykogen. Biochemische Zeitschrift 2, ss. 148—156, 1906
- Об остро-протекающем паранояльном синдроме. — Каз.: Типо-лит. Имп. ун-та, 1908.
- Über die Kerne des menschlichen Kleinhirns. Abhandlungen der Königlich Preussischen Akademie der Wissenschaft 5, ss. 1-15, 1911
- Основные проблемы при изучении душевных явлений. — Пятигорск: Г. Д. Сукиасянца, 1912.
- Über die Beziehung der Sprechfunktion zur Intonation, zum Ton und Rhytmus. Neurologisches Centralblatt 33, ss. 274—287, 1914.
- Внушение, как терапевтический метод в связи с уценем о психологической сущности неврозов и психозов. Варшавские университетские известия 2, s. 1-18, 1915-->
- Aphasie en rapport avec les phénomènes convulsifs et les troubles verbo-moteurs et verbosensoriels. Archives internationales de neurologie, des maladies héréditaires, de médecine mentale et psychosomatique 21, ss. 93-102, 1928.
- Analyse physiologique et clinique des processus d’inhibition. Encéphale 26: 689—700, 1931.
- Le But et la technique des recherches expérimentales des fauses (sic) images.
- Introduction à l’étude expérimentale du problème de l’hallucination. Archives internationales de neurologie, des maladies héréditaires, de médecine mentale et psychosomatique 58, ss. 176; 199; 223, 1940.
- Le rôle des troubles neuro-végétatifs dans la pathologie de la vie affective et dans l’origine des variations des fonctions perceptivo-associatives. Archives internationales de neurologie, des maladies héréditaires, de médecine mentale et psychosomatique 64/65, ss. 96-108, 1945/46
- Le mécanisme des troubles perceptivo-associatifs en rapport avec l’origine de l’hallucination et du délire (étude physiopathologique). — Peyronnet, 1946.
- Les hallucinations au cours des maladies mentales et les perceptions extremêment fines de la réalité. Archives internationales de neurologie, des maladies héréditaires, de médecine mentale et psychosomatique 67(5), ss. 107—109, 1948.
- Клинические и экспериментально-психологические исследования над больными, леченными препаратом E (в соавт. со Срезневским В. В.) и др.
