= Gregorio Sciltian =

Armenian painter (1900–1985)

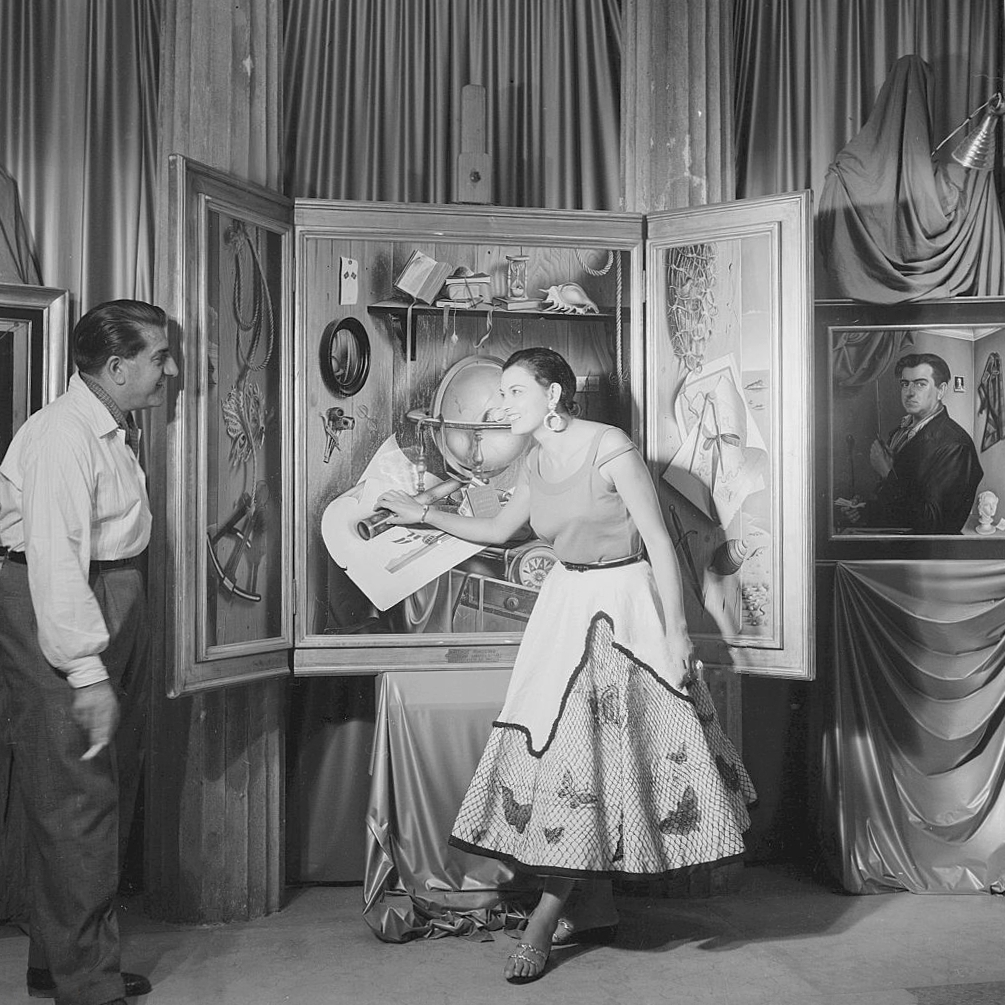
Gregorio Sciltian with his wife Elena Boberman in Venice in 1955

Gregorio Sciltian (Grigor Shildian; Armenian: Գրիգոր Շիլտյան; 20 August 1900 – 1 April 1985) was an Italian-Armenian painter, designer, and medallist. Sciltian is well known for his portraiture and trompe-l'œil compositions.

== Biography ==
He was born into an Armenian family on 20 August 1900 in Nakhichevan-on-Don (now part of Rostov-on-Don, Russia). After finishing the gymnasium in Moscow, he studied art at the Saint-Petersburg Academy of Fine Arts. After the October Revolution he temporarily settled in Tiflis. Then he studied at the academy and the Museum of Fine Arts of Vienna.

From 1923 to 1927 he lived in Rome. He participated in the Biennale of Rome in 1925 and the Biennale of Venice in 1926. Then lived in Paris and Milan. He died in 1985 in Rome.
