= Sergei Galadzhev =

Armenian-Soviet general

- Armenian: Սարգիս Գալաջյան; Russian: Сергей Федорович Галаджев
- Born: Sarkis Galajyan; 17 April 1902; Nor Nakhichevan, Russian Empire
- Died: 23 December 1954 (aged 52); Moscow, Soviet Union
- Burial place: Novodevichy Cemetery
- Military career
- Allegiance: Soviet Union
- Branch: Soviet Army
- Service years: 1919–1950
- Rank: Lieutenant General
- Commands: Red Army
- Conflicts: Russian Civil War; World War II
- Awards: Order of Lenin (3) see below

Sarkis Theodorosi Galajyan (Armenian: Սարգիս Թեոդորոսի Գալաջյան, Russian: Сергей Федорович Галаджев [Sergei Fedorovich Galadzhev], also Сергей Теодоросович Галаджев [Sergei Teodorosovich Galadzhev]; 17 April 1902 – 23 December 1954) was an Armenian-Soviet general and a political officer.

== Biography ==
=== Early life ===
Born to an impoverished Armenian family in the city of Nakhichevan-on-Don, Galadzhev started working in a bricks factory when he was fifteen. In 1919, after his father died of typhus, he joined the Red Army. He fought in the Civil War, participating in the battles against Wrangel and Makhno. He attended a commanders' course, but was transferred to non-combat duty when diagnosed with tuberculosis. After completing his mandatory military service he was dismissed. In 1924, he volunteered again to the Red Army, and was assigned to the 9th Don Division. A year later he became a Politruk, and in 1926 he joined the All-Union Communist Party(Bolsheviks). Galadzhev was transferred to the Political Directorate of the North Caucasus Military District in 1931. He graduated from the Leningrad Military-Political Academy during 1936. After several years as an instructor, he was appointed Military Commissar of the XXXII Corps in autumn 1940.

=== World War II ===
When Germany invaded the Soviet Union, he rose through the ranks, becoming the Southwestern Front's Chief of Political Directorate on 5 October 1941. As such, he participated in the Battle of Moscow. On 17 November, he was promoted to the rank of Divisional Commissar.

On 12 July 1942, the Front was disbanded and Galadzhev was transferred to the new Stalingrad Front, where he was assigned with the same duty. He remained Chief of Political Directorate when the Front was renamed as the Don Front on 30 September. On 8 December, after the separate ranks of the political officers were abolished, he became a major general.

The Don Front was restructured as the Central Front on 15 February 1943, with Galadzhev continuing to hold his position during the Battle of Kursk and with the formation of the 1st Belorussian Front on November that year from the Central's forces. In his memoirs, General Rokossovsky referred to him as 'highly qualified political officer and good comrade'. He served with the Front throughout the rest of the war, until it captured Berlin, attaining the rank of Lieutenant General on 28 July 1944.

=== Post-war career ===
Immediately after the Germans' surrender, Galadzhev was involved in organizing cultural life in the Soviet Occupation Zone. On his orders, the newspapers Tägliche Rundschau and Berliner Zeitung were established during May 1945. The general directly supervised the Ulbricht Group when it began forming the basis for a future communist rule.

Galadzhev accompanied the Soviet delegations in several meetings with American officers. He spoke with Frank A. Keating, Alvan Cullom Gillem Jr. and Alonzo Patrick Fox of the 102nd Division. Galadzhev headed the Political Directorate of the Group of Soviet Forces in Germany until 9 July 1945, when he was replaced by General Mikhail Pronin.

At August, he was put in charge of the Political Directorate of the Central Group of Forces, and in June 1946 he became the Political Directorate's Chief of the Soviet Army, retiring in April 1950. He died of a severe illness two years later on 23 December 1954 in Moscow.

== Awards ==
- Order of Lenin, three times
- Order of the Red Banner, four times
- Order of Suvorov, 2nd class
- Order of the Patriotic War, 1st class
- campaign and jubilee medals
