= Levon Chailakhyan =

- Born: June 21, 1928; Yerevan
- Died: February 23, 2009 (aged 80)
- Scientific career
- Fields: physiology, biophysics, embryology
- Institutions: Institute of Theoretical and Experimental Biophysics of Russian Academy of Sciences

Levon Mikhailovich Chailakhyan (Armenian: Լևոն Միքայելի Չայլախյան, Russian: Левон Михайлович Чайлахян; 21 June 1928 – 23 February 2009) was a Russian physiologist, biophysicist, and embryologist, also a member of the Russian Academy of Sciences. He was a director of the Institute of Theoretical and Experimental Biophysics of Russian Academy of Sciences, located in Pushchino, Moscow Oblast.

Chailakhyan published more than 450 works in Russian, and other countries around the world, he was also awarded the medal of the All-Russia Physiological Society. Chailakhyan along with B.N. Veprintsev, T.A. Sviridova, V.A. Nikitin had cloned the first mammal, known as Masha the mouse, which was ten years before Dolly the Sheep.

== Biography ==
Levon Chailakhyan was born in Yerevan to Mikhail Chailakhyan and Tamara Karlovna Amatuni-Chailakhyan. He was ethnic Armenian.

When he was 19, Levon began his education at the Biological Faculty of the Moscow State University, and graduated with specializing in Human and animal physiology.
