= Tateos Agekian =

Soviet astrophysicist

- Թադևոս Աղեկյան; Татеос Агекян
- Born: May 12, 1913; Batum, Russian Empire
- Died: 16 January 2006 (aged 92); Saint Petersburg, Russia
- Education: Saint Petersburg State University
- Scientific career
- Fields: theoretical astrophysics
- Workplaces: Saint Petersburg State University, Astronomical Institute of St. Petersburg University

Tateos Artemjevich Agekian (Armenian: Թադևոս Արտեմի Աղեկյան, Russian: Татеос Артемьевич Агекян; 12 May 1913 – 16 January 2006) was a Soviet astrophysicist of Armenian descent and one of the pioneers of Russian and world stellar dynamics. T. A. Agekian found two evolutionary sequences of stellar systems: nearly spherical and strongly flattened. He suggested essentially a new method to investigate the structure and kinematics of the Milky Way Galaxy. Found a new estimate for the dissipation rate in stellar clusters. Gave an exhaustive analysis of the photogravitational interaction between stars and gas clouds. An asteroid (3862, "Agekian") was named in his honor.

== Biography ==
T. A. Agekian was born to an Armenian family in Batum in 1913. After graduating from the Leningrad University, in 1938, he began to work as a school teacher. After some years he began his post-graduate studies, but was interrupted because of World War II. Agekian participated in the war as chief of staff of an artillery regiment. After the demobilization, he returned to Leningrad University and worked at the Department of Stellar Astronomy. He received the degree of Candidate of Physical and Mathematical Sciences in 1947. In 1960, he became a Doctor of Physical and Mathematical Sciences and later he received the title of Professor. He was the Head of Laboratory of Stellar Dynamics and Celestial Mechanics of the Astronomical Institute of St. Petersburg University. He died on January 16, 2006, in Saint Petersburg.

== Scientific activity ==
Most of his work is connected with applying the methods of mathematical statistics and theory of random processes to stellar astronomy. In particular, studying the results of star and galaxy counts, he was able to separate the effects of real clustering and the effects due to a clumpy structure of the absorbing layer and to estimate the cluster parameters.

Developing the theory of stellar encounters, T. A. Agekian found the probability of encounters with a given velocity change and studied the effect of the encounter multiplicity. These results gave him a possibility to find a new estimate for the dissipation rate in stellar clusters.

In the studies of the influence of the stellar evaporation on the evolution of rotating systems, T. A. Agekian has discovered the existence of two evolutionary subsystems: the spherical and the flattened ones.

Agekian gave an exhaustive analysis of the photogravitational interaction between stars and gas clouds. The results obtained provide a possible explanation for the phenomenon of the stellar velocity increase with age.

Agekian initiated a numerical study of triple systems and a statistical analysis of results. Among other results, Agekian and his collaborators found the probabilities of capture and exchange. They proposed a classification of the states of triple systems. Agekian also studied the problem of motion in the field of an axially symmetrical potential, and being author of new methods, achieved some new results in this difficult topic. He was one of the pioneers of Stellar Dynamics.

Since the 1970s, Agekian studied mainly the problem of motion in the field of an axially symmetrical potential. He proposed new methods and achieved some new results in the field.
