= Joseph Hakobyan =

Russian scientist

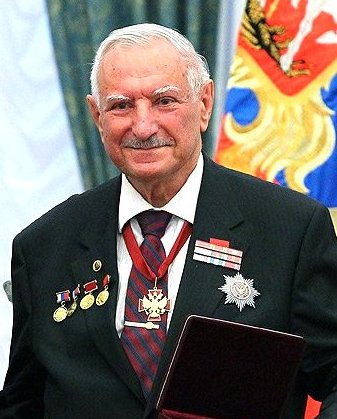
Hakobyan in August 2015

Joseph G. Hakobyan (born 28 August 1931) is a Russian scientist. He is an expert on missiles development. He was the Deputy General of the Moscow Research Institute.

Hakobyan was born in Saratov, Russia.
