= Erast Osipyan =

Russian footballer

Personal information
- Full name: Erast Ernestovich Osipyan
- Date of birth: 15 January 1965 (age 61)
- Place of birth: Kemerovo, Russia
- Height: 1.74 m (5 ft 9 in)
- Positions: Midfielder; forward

Senior career*
Years	Team	Apps	(Gls)
1982	FC Mashuk Pyatigorsk	0	(0)
1982–1984	FC Dynamo Stavropol	45	(3)
1985	FC Spartak Hoktemberyan	11	(1)
1986	FC Kotayk	40	(3)
1987–1990	FC Ararat Yerevan	78	(7)
1991–1993	FC Dynamo Stavropol	71	(4)
1993	FC Interros Moskovsky	2	(0)
1994–1995	FC Lada Togliatti	1	(0)
1995	→ FC Lada-d Togliatti	1	(0)
1996–1997	FC Spartak-Orekhovo Orekhovo-Zuyevo	20	(5)
1997	FC Motor Yessentuki		
- * Club domestic league appearances and goals

Erast Ernestovich Osipyan (Russian: Эраст Эрнестович Осипян; born 15 January 1965) is a Russian former professional footballer.

== Club career ==
He made his professional debut in the Soviet Second League in 1982 for FC Dynamo Stavropol.
