= ANIVAR =

Russian singer & video blogger (born 1997)

- Born: Ani Vardaryan; May 27, 1997 (age 29); Vladikavkaz, Russia

YouTube information
- Channel: ANIVAR

Ani Vardaryan (born 27 May 1997), known as ANIVAR, is a Russian videoblogger and singer.

== Biography ==
Anivar was born in North Ossetia to an Armenian family.

She started singing at an early age. Her grandmother was a music instructor, and noticing the musical abilities of Vardaryan, decided she should go to music school. Vardaryan wanted to be a vocalist, but her parents made her take up the violin. She then learned piano, as well as guitar on her own.

Her Instagram account Варданян became popular, and attracted advertisers. Her early earnings were around two thousand rubles.

Vardaryan adopted the name ANIVAR and moved to Moscow.

In 2019 Anivar released several songs, like «Ты мой рай», «Нечего скрывать», «Любимый человек» and «Без тебя». The song «Любимый человек» in December 2020 won her the «Golden Gramophone».

On 26 February 2020, Anivar announced her first album titled «Новый рассвет».

In the summer of 2020 Anivar announced the end to her music career.

On December 11, 2020, Anivar released an EP titled «Высоко».

== Personal life ==
Vardaryan has a husband named Karen. They were married on 7 October 2017. Her son, Ivan, was born on 1 November 2018. Her daughter, Daniela, was born on 2 July 2021.

== Discography ==
«Новый рассвет»
Review scores
Source	Rating
InterMedia	7.5/10 stars

«Высоко»
Review scores
Source	Rating
InterMedia	7.5/10 stars

=== Albums ===
Name	Details
«Новый рассвет»	Released: 26 February 2020; Label: Monolit

=== Mini albums (EP) ===
Name	Details
«Высоко»	Released: 11 December 2020; Label: Monolit

=== Singles ===
Year	Name	Charts			References
Year	Name	RU			References
Year	Name	TopHit Top Radio & YouTube Hits	TopHit Top Radio Hits	TopHit Top YouTube Hits	References
2017	«Твоя улыбка»				Music Download
2017	«Ты ещё вспомнишь»				Music Download
2017	«Держи меня крепче»				Music Download
2017	«Сердце пополам»				Music Download
2018	«Обещай»	323	—	—	Music Download
2018	«Лето»	399	369	—	Music Download
2018	«Всё Моё» (ANIVAR, Катя Адушкина и Никита Морозов)				Music Download
2018	«Украду»	175	—	87	Music Download
2018	«Пустота души»	408	—	48	Music Download
2019	«Падает звезда»	48	50	88	Music Download
2019	«Нечего скрывать»	140	—	27	Music Download
2019	«Падает звезда» (Dj Antonio Remix)	—	—	—	Music Download, 24 April 2019
2019	«Крыльями»	640	—	62	Music Download, 17 May 2019
2019	«Лето» (Remix)				Music Download, 14 June 2019
2019	«Любимый человек»	11	27	3	Music Download, 18 June 2019
2019	«Без тебя»	482	372	—	Music Download, 18 July 2019
2019	«Не молчи»				Music Download, 21 November 2019
2020	«Руку держи» (ANIVAR & ADAMYAN)				Music Download, 13 February 2020
2020	«Руку держи» (RJS Remix) (ANIVAR & ADAMYAN)				Music Download, 15 August 2020
2020	«Руку держи» (IOHANNES Remix) (ANIVAR & ADAMYAN)				Music Download, 20 August 2020
2020	«Молитва» (ANIVAR & ADAMYAN)				Music Download, 25 December 2020

==== With other singers ====
Year	Name	References
2019	«Ты мой рай» (Ragion remix) (NAYMADA feat. ANIVAR & Karen ТУЗ)	Music Download

== Awards and nominations ==
Year	Ceremony	Nominated work	Results	Refs.
2020	Golden Gramophone Award 2020	«Любимый человек»	Won	
