= Leyla Adamyan =

Russian gynecologist

Leyla Adamyan Лейла Адамян
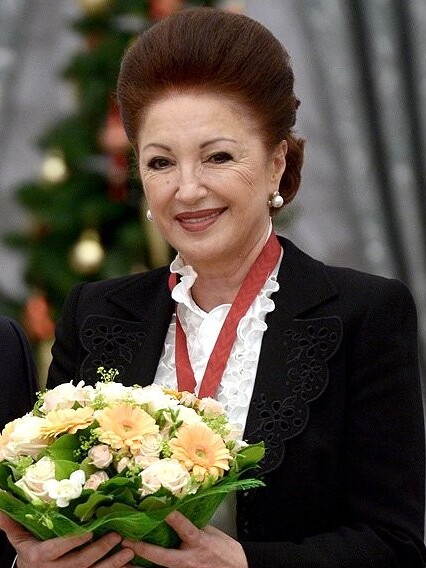
- Born: January 20, 1949 (age 77); Tbilisi, Georgian Soviet Socialist Republic
- Citizenship: Russia
- Education: First Moscow State Medical University
- Known for: Chief obstetrician-gynecologist of the Russian Federation
- Awards: Full cavalier of the Order "For Merit to the Fatherland"

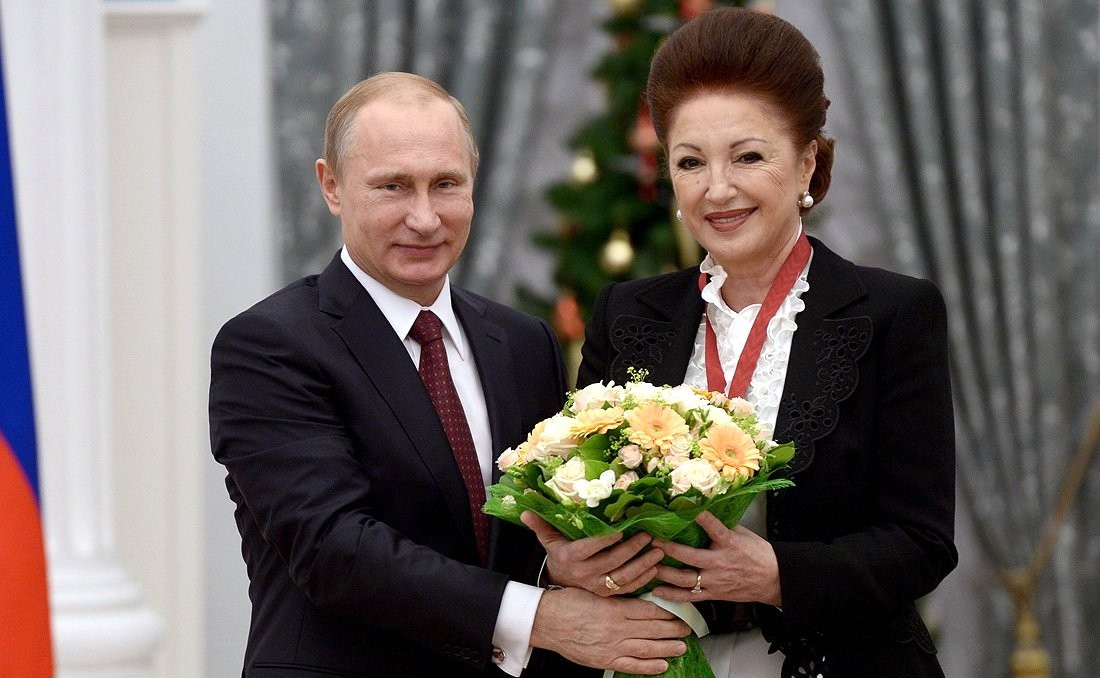

Leyla Vladimirovna Adamyan (Armenian: Լեյլա Վլադիմիրի Ադամյան, Russian: Ле́йла Влади́мировна Адамя́н: born January 20, 1949, Tbilisi) is a Soviet and Russian obstetrician-gynecologist, doctor of medical sciences, teacher, professor of Armenian descent.

== Biography ==
She was born in Tbilisi in 1949. Her father was a master engineer at a factory and her mother was a primary school teacher. Despite the fact that her family had nothing to do with medicine, both she and her sister Svetlana have been interested in it since childhood. Because their mother had to raise them on her own, Leyla did her best in her school and finished it with a medal, thanks to which she was able to enter medical school, having passed only one exam.

In 1972, she graduated with honours from the First Moscow State Medical University. In 1974, she completed her residency at the Department of Obstetrics and Gynaecology, Faculty of Medicine.

In 1977 she defended her Candidate's dissertation: "Reproductive function in patients with endometrioid ovarian cysts before and after treatment"; in 1985 she defended her Doctoral dissertation: "Reproductive function in patients with endometrioid ovarian cysts before and after treatment".

She continued her postgraduate studies at the All-Union Research Institute of Obstetrics and Gynecology of the USSR Ministry of Health (now the Scientific Centre of Obstetrics, Gynecology and Perinatology of the Russian Academy of Medical Sciences), where she subsequently worked as a junior researcher (1977-1980) and senior researcher (1980-1989).

Since 1989 she has been the head of the Department of Operative Gynecology at Kulakov Research Center of Obstetrics, Gynecology and Perinatology.

Chief obstetrician-gynecologist of the Russian Federation.

Academician of the Academy of Medical Sciences (2004; Corresponding Member of 1999). Academician of the Russian Academy of Sciences (2013).

== Awards and honors ==
- Honored Worker of Science (2002).
- Winner of Russian Government Prize (2001).
- Awarded Order "For Merit to the Fatherland" 2nd (2018), 3rd (2014) and 4th class (2009)
