= Ashot Sahratyan =

Armenian poet (1936–2015)

- Born: July 2, 1936; Moscow
- Died: November 20, 2015 (aged 79); Moscow
- Education: Yerevan State University Maxim Gorky Literature Institute
- Occupations: poet, translator and artist

Ashot Aristakesovich Sahratyan (Armenian: Աշոտ Արիստակեսի Սահրատյան; Russian: Ашот Аристакесович Сагратян, July 2, 1936 – November 20, 2015) was an Armenian-Russian poet, translator and artist. He was awarded the Golden Pushkin medal.

In 1958 Sahratyan graduated from Yerevan State University and later worked as a lecturer at the Maxim Gorky Literature Institute from 1969 to 1995. He was a member of the Board of the Translators' Union of Russia.
