= Mozee Montana =

Russian rapper (born 1997)

Mozee Montana Али́на Сарки́совна Мкртчян
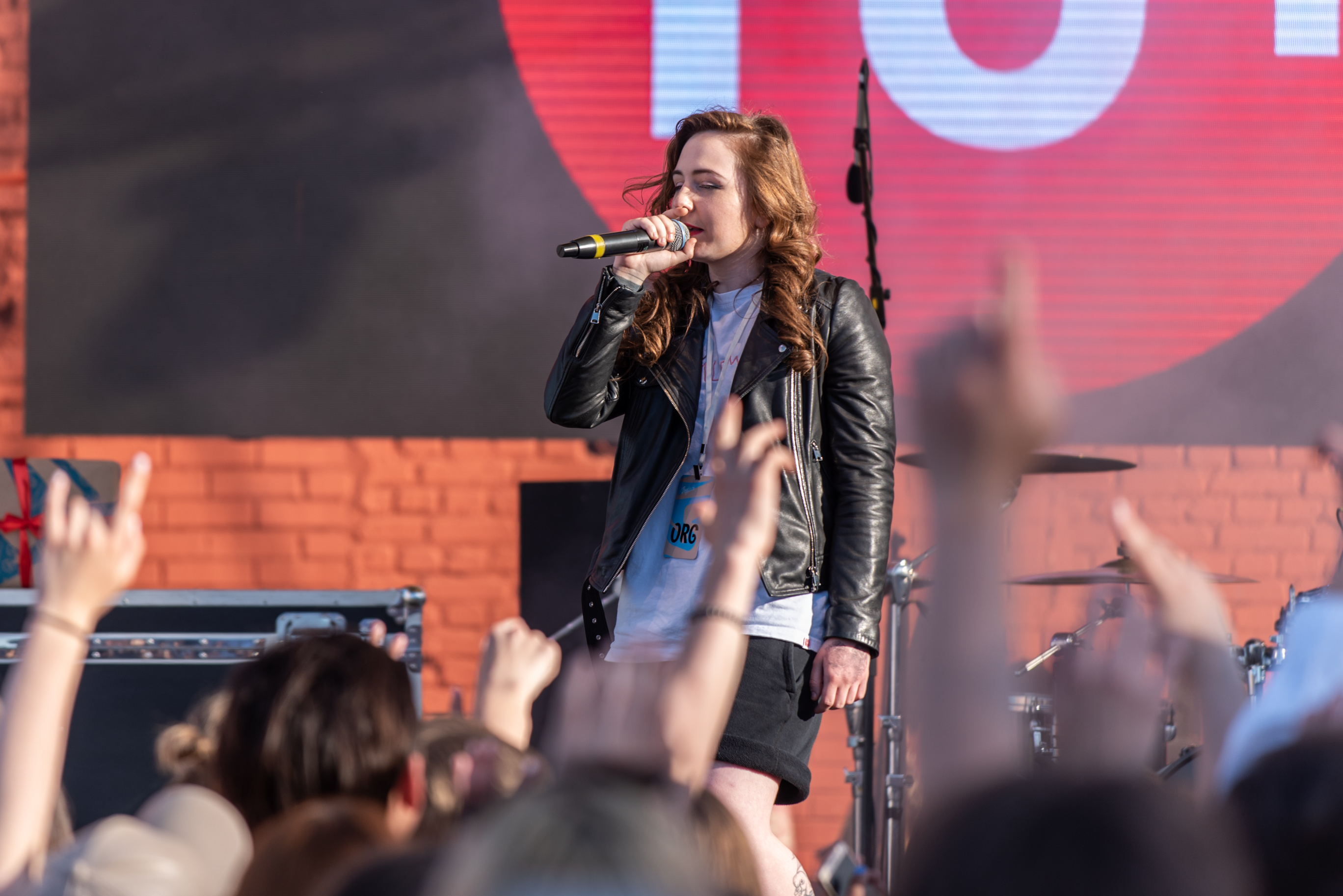

Background information
- Also known as: Mozee Montana and $low Mo
- Born: August 16, 1997 (age 28); Yerevan, Armenia
- Genres: Rap
- Occupation: Rapper
- Website: https://vk.com/montanamozee

Alina Sarkisovna Mkrtchyan ((Russian: Али́на Сарки́совна Мкртчян, tr. Alina Sarkisovna Mkrtchyan) born August 16, 1997, Yerevan), better known as Mozee Montana, is a Russian rapper currently active in Moscow, Russia.

== Biography ==
Alina Sarkisovna Mkrtchyan was born in Yerevan, the capital of Armenia. At an early age, she moved with her family to Vladivostok, the administrative center of Primorsky Krai region in Russia. Since her childhood, she was influenced by the listening habits of her father, who listened to 1990s American rappers such as Tupac and Big Pun. When Alina was 9 years old, her father died and shortly after, her mother began to use drugs, later stopping. However, Alina would also have trouble with drug addiction during this time, although recovering like her mother shortly after. Around this time, Alina began to write her first attempts at poetry, and by age 11 she began making her first rap tracks. The year after, she began participating in her region's rap battles, although the regular attendees didn't take her seriously at the time.

In 2014–2015, Alina released her first finished products: three mini-albums under the pseudonym $low Mo - Total Black, XXXVI and LTVM. After turning 17, despite being a good student she dropped out of the 10th grade and moved to Moscow with only 50,000 rubles to her name (equivalent to 684.11 dollars). According to Alina, when she arrived in the capital, it was hard for her to pay rent, as she also wanted to send money to her mother. She did not find another job and had to work as a pawnbroker. At 18, she was working as a ghostwriter and also opened a business with her friend, earning her first million rubles that way. One of the first collaborative projects Alina took part in was the international mixtape called "International Quality," put together by the label "Monopoly."

During this time, she began to gain popularity after she was invited to the far East branch of SLOVO[rus], a Russian battle rap organization with numerous branches across Russia. After that, she was noticed on Twitter by Russian rapper Oxxxymiron, Alina commenting about female rap in Russia. After sending the rapper her SoundCloud, the rapper paid attention to her and praised her, and as a result achieved a significant increase in Twitter followers. At this time, Alina decided to give herself the rap name Mozee Montana in order to cement her new career.

On July 28, 2017, the mini-album Hayastan Boomin was released, which contained a collaboration with Emelevskaya called "Belucci." The track was later filmed as a music video. During that same year, on September 29, the second part of the album called Hayastan Boomin 2 was released.

On April 6, 2018, the first full-length album "Young Legend" was released, and twelve days later on October 18, the next full-length album Flashback was also released. On November 29, 2019, another album "The Worst of All" was additionally released.

On January 20, 2023, Alina's mother died.

== Battle rap experience ==
Alina got her start in rap by participating in local battle raps in Vladivostok. However, starting in 2016 she would begin to grow her audience thanks to her participation in more formal battle rap scenes. In 2016, on an invitation she participated in the far Eastern section of the SLOVO rap battle organization against Andrey Ivanov (Mad Mind). She would then battle Yesenia Sergeevna Maiskaya (E404), winning despite critical feedback. The following year, after having sent in an application to the event 140 BPM Cup, Alina would battle seasoned rapper Ivan Vitalievich Petunin (Walkie) and gain the praise of the Russian rap community for her craft. Shortly after, on the invitation of Denis Evgenievich Chudinovsky (Den Shevy), she joined the group "Mom's GirlfriendGun" and competed in the event "Rip on Bits."

In 2018, Alina participated as a solo artist in the event "Versus BPM," competing against rapper Vladimir Aleksandrovich Galat (Galat)[rus], again impressing the crowd and judges. Later that year, in December she battled against Andrei Andreevich Zamai (Zamai)[rus] and Fallen MC during the event "Rapyou Battle."

== Citizenship ==
In August 2017, in an interview with The Flow, she shared that she has a negative attitude towards radical feminism and said that in general, she does not associate herself with feminism.

In 2019, an open letter was written in support of Samariddin Radjabov and other defendants in the "Moscow case"[rus], signed by Alina.

== Personal life ==
Alina has a tattoo of the date 1915, the beginning of the Armenian genocide.

== Discography ==
=== Albums ===
- 2018: Young Legend (Rhymes Music)
- 2018: flashback (Union Music)
- 2019: Worst of all (Independent)

=== Mini-albums ===
- 2017: Hayastan Boomin
- 2017: Hayastan Boomin 2

=== Single ===
Year	Name
2017	"Not bad for a woman"
2017	"No Pain"
2018	"Neon Dreams"
2018	"Every Day"
2018	"On the Hotel Floor"
2018	"Bazaar"
2018	"Better Than Now"
2018	"Thorn"
2019	"Flashforward"
2019	"Do like Peppa"
2019	"On a long journey"
2019	"Ocean is shaking"
2019	"Wind of change"
2021	"Ninini"
2021	"Wow"
2021	"Fatherlessness"
2021	"Argument"
2022	"777"
2022	"Red light"
2022	"Tonus"
2022	"Kra"
2022	"Not today"
