= Nakhichevan-on-Don =

1779–1928 Armenian-populated town in Russia

Coordinates: 47°13′53″N 39°45′25″E

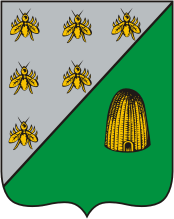
The coat of arms of Nakhichevan-on-Don, adopted in 1811, depicts bees and a beehive—symbolizing hardworking Armenians.

Nakhichevan-on-Don (Russian: Нахичевань-на-Дону, Naxičevan’-na-Donu), also known as New Nakhichevan (Armenian: Նոր Նախիջևան, Nor Naxiĵevan; as opposed to the "old" Nakhichevan), was an Armenian-populated town near Rostov-on-Don, in southern Russia founded in 1779 by Armenians from Crimea. It retained the status of a city until 1928 when it was merged with Rostov.

== History ==
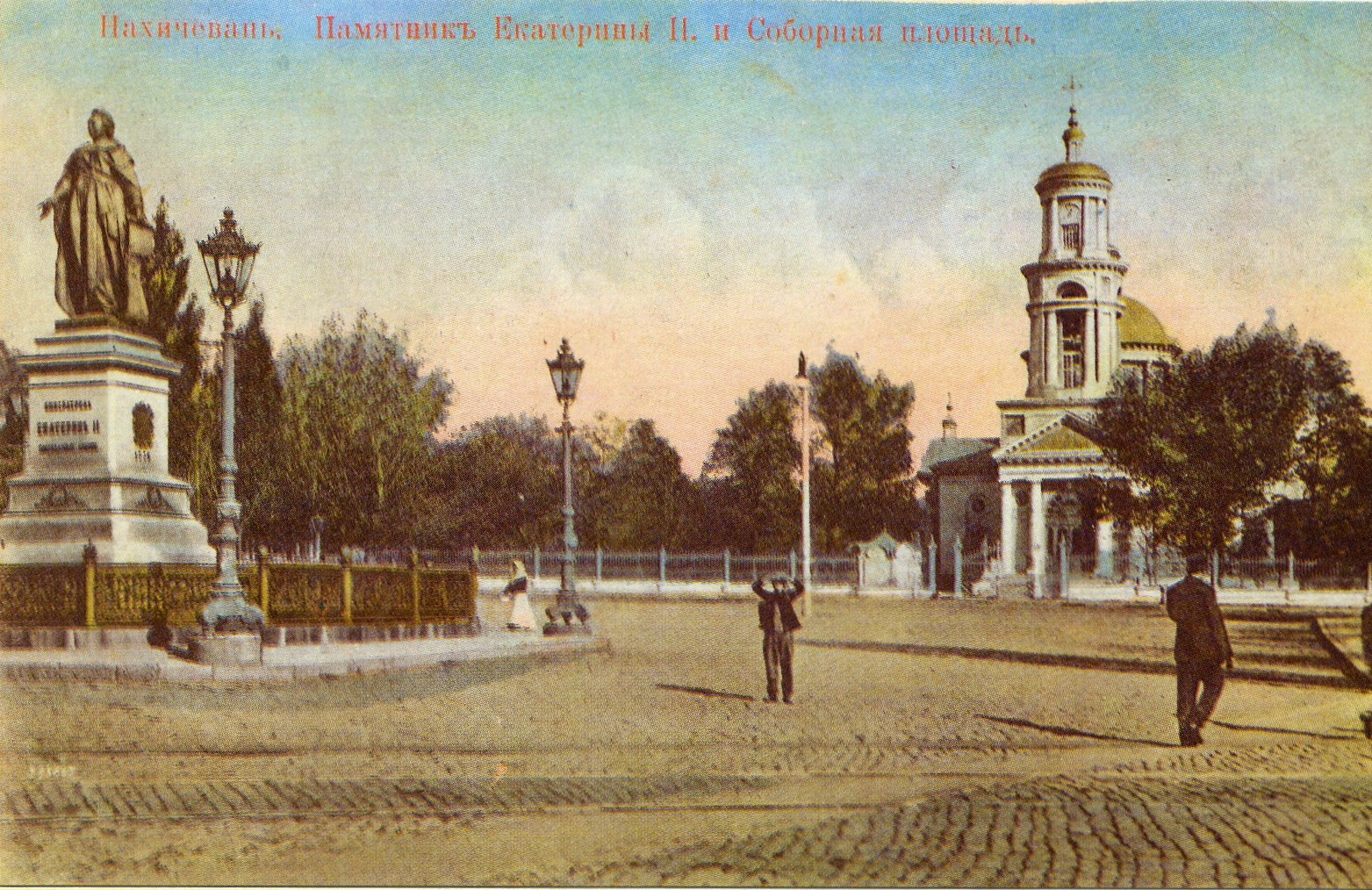
Monument to Catherine the Great and the Gregory the Illuminator cathedral on the city's main square

In the summer of 1778, after the Crimean Khanate was made a Russian vassal state, some 12,600 Armenians of the Crimean peninsula were resettled by General Alexander Suvorov in the Don region. The Russian Empire sought to strengthen Novorossiya, which was vital in completely absorbing the Crimea. Empress Catherine the Great granted some 86,000 ha of land to the Armenians by a November 14, 1779 decree. The project of resettlement was promoted and financed by Count Hovhannes Lazarian.

A third of the Armenians perished en route and during the first winter. The settlement of New Nakhichevan was founded by the survivors. It "rapidly grew into an important town with its own cathedral and seminary." In 1894 the Armenian community erected the Alexander Column in Nakhichevan-on-Don to celebrate the Emperor Alexander II of Russia.

Around the turn of the twentieth century it was part of the Don Host Oblast. In 1896 it had an estimated population of 32,174, of which 14,618 (45.4%) were native residents and 17,556 (54.6%) were nonresidents. The Armenian Apostolic population was estimated at 18,895 (58.7%), Orthodox at 10,965 (34.1%), others (Jews, Old Believers, Muslims, Catholics, Protestants) at 2,314 (7.1%). According to the 1897 Russian Imperial census the city had a population of 28,427. East Slavic-speakers (Russians, Ukrainians and Belarusians) made up around two-thirds of the population (19,224), while Armenians (8,277) comprised a significant minority (29.1%).

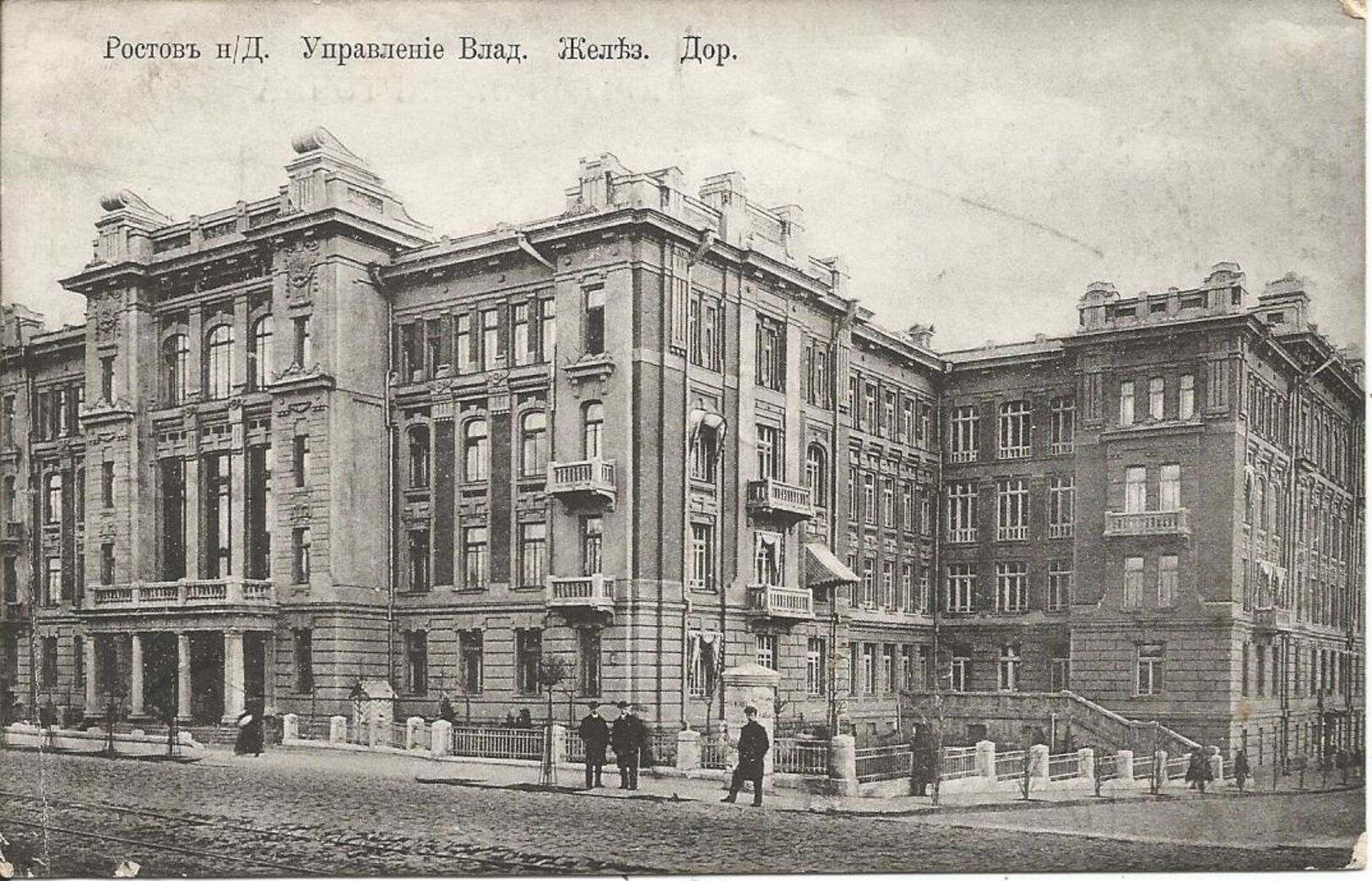
Nakhichevan-on-Don Vladikavkaz Railway Administration, between 1890 and 1917

== Merger with Rostov and later history ==
By the late 19th century it was "engulfed by the growth of Rostov." As early as 1897, the entry in the Brockhaus and Efron Encyclopedic Dictionary said about the city: "Currently, Nakhichevan-on-Don has merged with Rostov so that the boundaries of the two cities can only be determined by a plan approved 11 May 1811." On 28 December 1928, Nor Nakhichevan was officially made part of Rostov. In 1929, the area was redesignated as the Proletarsky raion (Пролетарский район), Rostov's largest district. As of 2001, it amounted to a "kind of Armenian quarter within the city." According to the 2010 Russian census, of the 41,553 Armenians in the city of Rostov-on-Don, 10,008 or almost 25% of all Armenians live in the Proletarsky district, where they make up more than 8% of the population, well above the city's total percentage of Armenians (at 3.8%).

== Notable people from Nakhichevan-on-Don ==
- Raphael Patkanian (1830–1892), Armenian writer
- Mikayel Nalbandian (1839–1866), Armenian writer
- George VI of Armenia (1868–1954), Catholicos of All Armenians
- Martiros Saryan (1880–1972), Armenian painter
- Simon Vratsian (1882–1969), Prime Minister of the First Republic of Armenia
- Sargis Lukashin (Srabionian) (1883–1937), chairman of the Council of People's Commissars (1922–1925)
- Sergei Galadzhev (1902–1954), Soviet general
- Gevork Vartanian (1924–2012), Soviet intelligence agent
- Alexander Miasnikian (1886–1925), chairman of the Council of People's Commissars (1921–1922) of the Armenian Soviet Socialist Republic
- Ervand Kogbetliantz (1888–1974), mathematician and first president of Yerevan State University
- Nina Garsoïan (1923–2022), historian
- Mikhail Chailakhyan (1902–1991), scientist
- Marietta Shaginyan (1888–1982), historian and writer
- Ashot Melkonian (1930–2009), artist
- Miron Merzhanov (1895–1975), personal architect to Stalin
- Constantin Alajalov (1900–1987), Armenian-American painter and illustrator; created more than 70 front covers for The New Yorker
- Stepan Kechekjan (1890–1967), lawyer and historian
- Avet Ter-Gabrielyan (1899–1983), violinist and founder of the Komitas Quartet
- Gayane Chebotaryan (1918–1998), composer and musicologist
- Ashot Melkonian (1930-2009), artist
- Alexander Kemurdzhian (1921–2003), mechanical engineer who designed Lunokhod 1, the first ever planetary rover for space exploration
- Gregorio Sciltian (1900–1985), painter

== See also ==
- Holy Cross Church, Nakhichevan on Don
- Armenians in Russia
- Myasnikovsky District, a nearby raion (district) with an Armenian majority. It includes several villages that date back to the same period.
- List of Armenian ethnic enclaves
