= Sergo Grigorian =

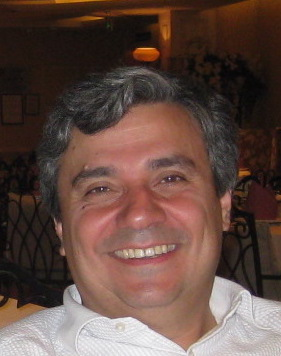
Sergo Grigorian

Sergo Grigorian, PhD (Armenian: Սերգո Գրիգորյան; Russian: Серго Григорян; born January 15, 1961, Moscow, Russian SFSR, Soviet Union) is a Russian art collector of Armenian descent, best known for his collection of Soviet political propaganda posters.

== Sergo Grigorian Collection ==
A devotee of Soviet history and culture, Grigorian constructed his collection over a period of 15 years. Known as the Sergo Grigorian Collection, it encompasses over 2,000 Soviet political posters, or "communist posters," as they are known in the West. The time frame of the collection spans the whole Soviet era, from February 1917 to December 1991, when the USSR ceased to exist. This historical period of Russia attracts a lot of interest as an experiment to build a fair and equitable society. The Soviet political poster has shown a successful past application of visual propaganda in political strife. The primary focus of Grigorian's collection is on political propaganda, hence such famous categories as cinema, theatre, circus, sports and advertisement have been deliberately excluded, unless they have a clear underlying political meaning. Apart from the vast collection of posters, Grigorian is also known for collecting the literature about Soviet graphics and poster art.

== Exhibitions ==
- 25.11-07.17.2002 – A major exhibitions and sale of Soviet Era posters, Red-Avant-Garde, Menier Gallery, London.
- 21.03-27.03.2004 – A major exhibitions and sale of Soviet Era posters, Red-Avant-Garde, The Air Gallery, London.
- 09.05-16.05.2007 – Exhibition of Soviet Posters, Russian Embassy, London.
- 20.04-03.05.2010 – "Peace. War. Victory", exhibition of posters from Sergo Grigorian collection, Photocenter, Moscow.
- 17.01-15.02.2013 – Death to World Capitalism, Petrovsky Passage (Petrovsky Arcade), Moscow.

== Publications ==
- 17.06.2007 Soviet Posters. The Sergo Grigorian Collection by Maria Lafont.
- 31.03.2011 Soviet Anti-American Posters. From the Sergo Grigorian collection.
- 02.01.2012 Soviet Anti-Alcohol Posters. From the Sergo Grigorian collection.
- 28.07.2012 Death to World Capitalism. From the Sergo Grigorian collection.
- 09.11.2012 Soviet Anti-American Posters. From the Sergo Grigorian collection, 2nd edition.
- 13.03.2013 Russian Revolutionary Posters. From the Sergo Grigorian collection.
- 28.04.2013 Soviet Political Poster. Bibliographical reference. AGIT-WINDOWS, TASS WINDOWS. 1941–1945.
- 23.07.2013 Lenin. Posters from the Sergo Grigorian Collection.
- 12.04.2014 Death to World Capitalism. Posters from the Sergo Grigorian collection. 2nd altered edition.
- 15.08.2014 "They taint out lives". Posters from the Sergo Grigorian collection.
- 06.09.2014 Soviet Anti-American Posters. From the Sergo Grigorian collection, 3rd edition.
- 29.01.2015 "Soviet Posters" from the Sergo Grigorian collection, Prestel Publishing House, text by Maria Lafont. 22 pull-out posters.
- 04.09.2015 "Strengthen our defences!" Posters from the Sergo Grigorian' collection.
