= Samvel Kocharyants =

Soviet nuclear scientist

- Սամվել Քոչարյանց
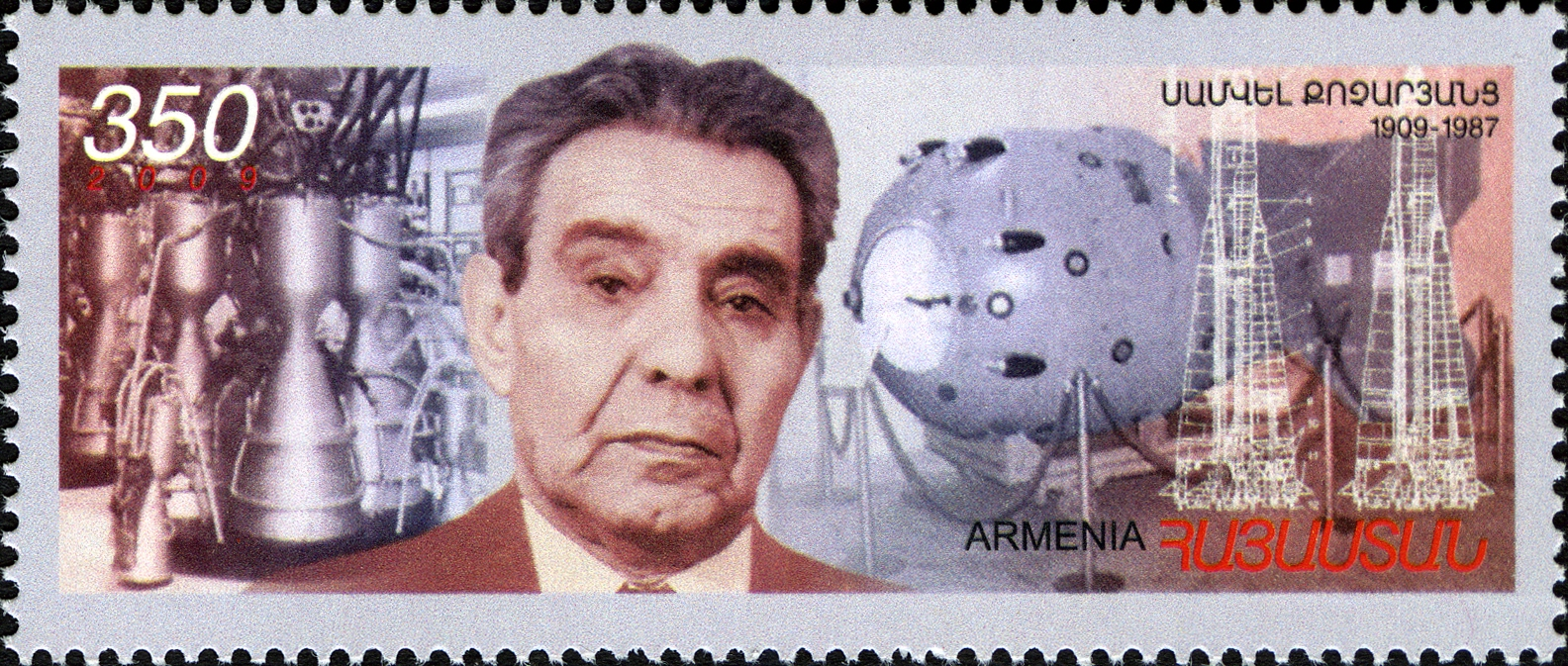
- Born: January 7, 1909; Gavar, Russian Empire
- Died: August 4, 1993 (aged 84); Sarov, Russia
- Known for: Chief developer of the first Soviet nuclear warheads for ballistic missiles
- Awards: Hero of Socialist Labor (1962, 1984)
- Scientific career
- Workplaces: All-Russian Scientific Research Institute of Experimental Physics (VNIIEF)

Samvel Grigorievich Kocharyants (Russian: Самвел Григорьевич Кочарянц; Armenian: Սամվել Գրիգորի Քոչարյանց; born 7 January 1909 in Gavar, Russian Empire, died 4 August 1993 in Sarov, Russia) was a Soviet Armenian designer and developer of the first Soviet nuclear warheads for ballistic missiles. He was awarded Hero of Socialist Labor twice.

== Awards ==
- Hero of Socialist Labor (2).
- Order of Lenin (6).
- Order of the October Revolution.
- Medal "For Labour Valour".
- Jubilee Medal "In Commemoration of the 100th Anniversary of the Birth of Vladimir Ilyich Lenin".
- Honored Worker of Science and Technology of the RSFSR.
- Lenin Prize.
- Stalin Prize (3).
- USSR State Prize.
