= Boris Abalyan =

Russian choir conductor (born 1947)

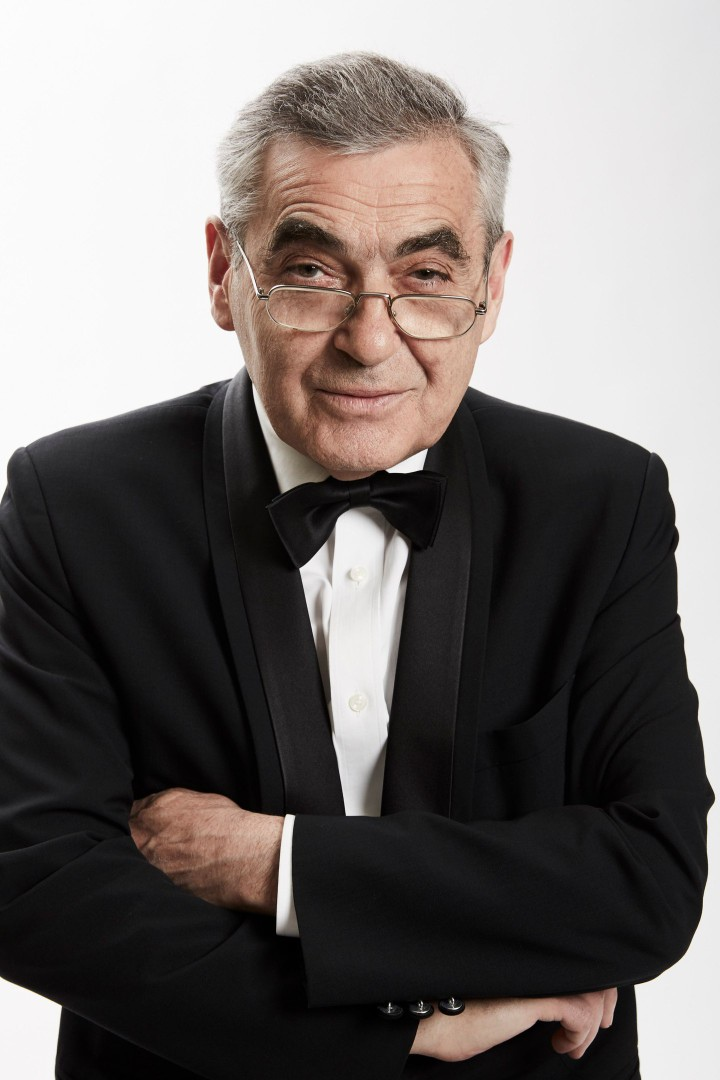
Image of Abalyan

Boris Georgievich Abalyan (Russian: Бори́с Георги́евич Абалья́н; born 28 October 1947) is a Russian choir conductor. He founded the Lege Artis Chamber Choir in 1987 and is its chief conductor.

He was born on October 28, 1947. He graduated from the Mikhail Glinka Choral College in Saint Petersburg, then the Saint Petersburg Conservatory and postgraduate studies.

Honored Artist of the Russian Federation (2005).
