= Koryun Nahapetyan =

Russian painter (1926–1999)

Koryun Nahapetyan (Armenian: Կորյուն Նահապետյան; Russian: Корюн Григорьевич Нагапетян; 1926 in Leninakan – 1999 in Moscow) was an Armenian-Russian painter-nonconformist, sociologist, philosopher and public activist, a participant of the Bulldozer Exhibition. He was a member of UNESCO International Federation of Painters.

== Biography ==
Nahapetyan was born in Hatsik village, near Leninakan, Soviet Armenia. In 1950 he moved to Moscow and worked there in the ZiL factory.

Nahapetyan finished the art school in Leninakan and Stroganov Moscow State University of Arts and Industry, entered the post-graduate courses at the VNIITE. In 1978 he founded the "20 Moscow painters" movement.

In 1988 he became one of the founders of Karabakh Committee of Moscow. In 1999 Nahapetyan was killed in his studio.
