= Mikhail Chailakhyan =

Armenian-Soviet scientist botanist (1902–1991)

Mikhail Kristapori Chailakhyan
- Born: 1902; Nakhichevan-on-Don, Don Host Oblast, Russian Empire
- Died: 1991 (aged 88–89); Moscow, Russian SFSR, Soviet Union
- Known for: contributions to plant physiology and flowering
- Scientific career
- Fields: plant growth and development

Mikhail Khristoforovich Chailakhyan (Armenian: Միքայել Քրիստափորի Չայլախյան, Russian: Михаи́л Христофо́рович Чайлахя́н; 1902–1991) was a Soviet Armenian scientist who is widely known for proposing the existence of a universal plant hormone that is involved in flowering. He named this hormone florigen in 1936. His studies included the mechanisms of flowering, tuberization and sex expression in plants. His pioneer work included the agricultural applications of phytohormones and synthetic analogs.
