= List of environmentalists =

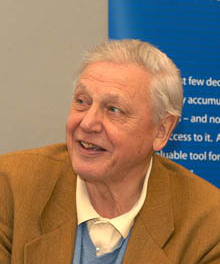
Sir David Attenborough in May 2003

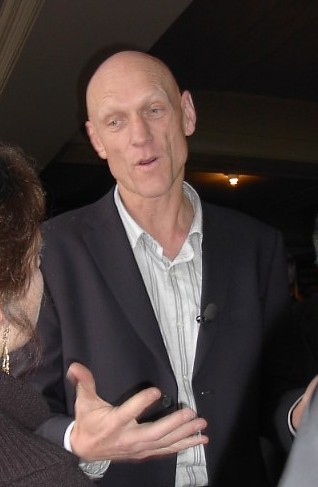
Peter Garrett campaigning for the 2004 Australian federal election

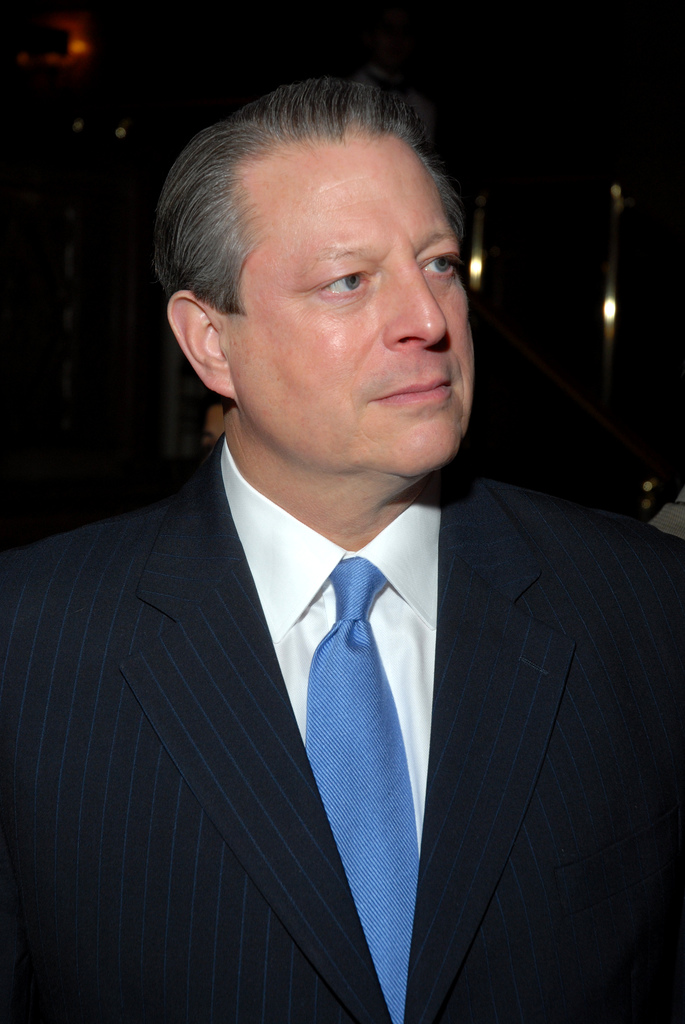
Al Gore, 2007

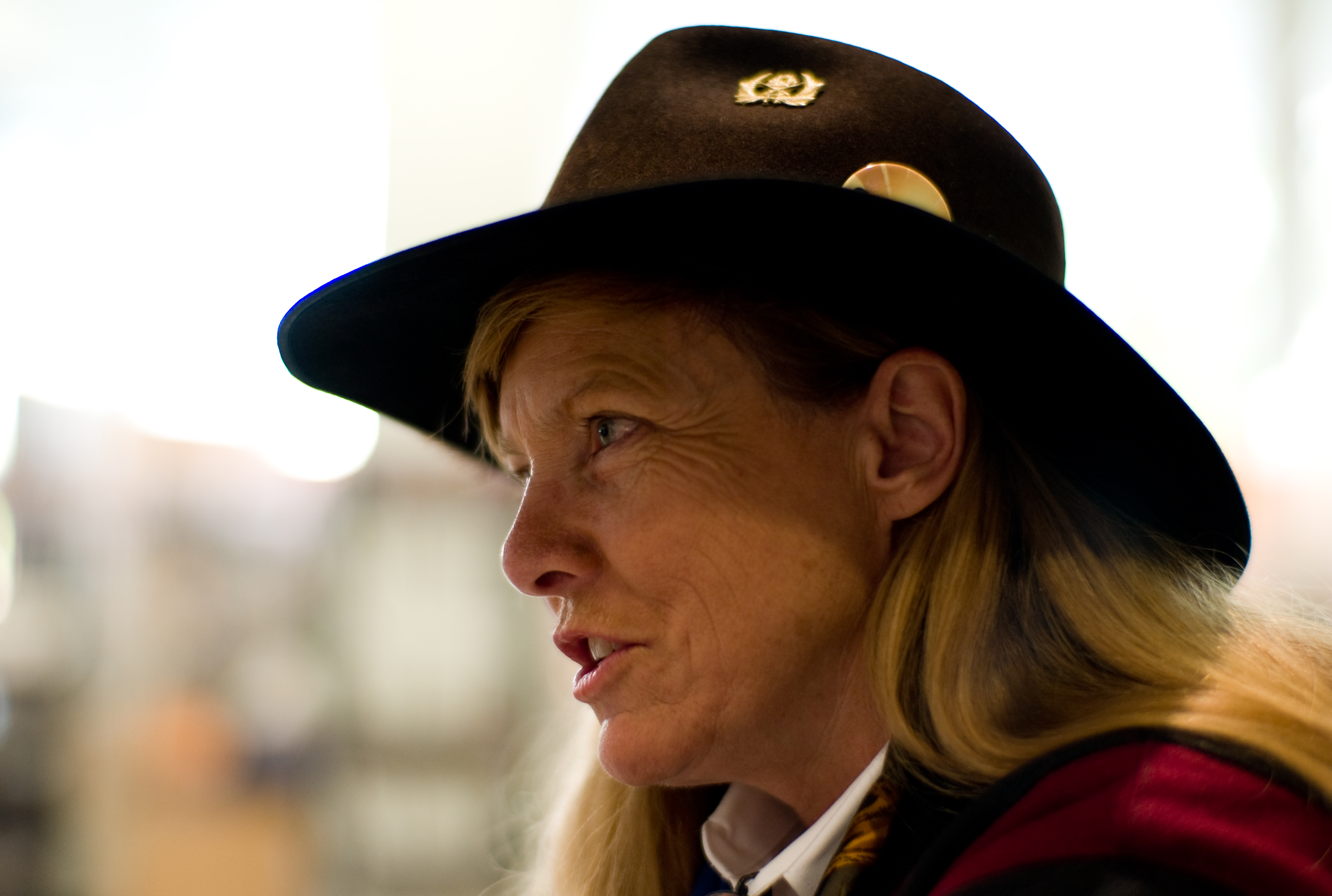
Hunter Lovins, 2007

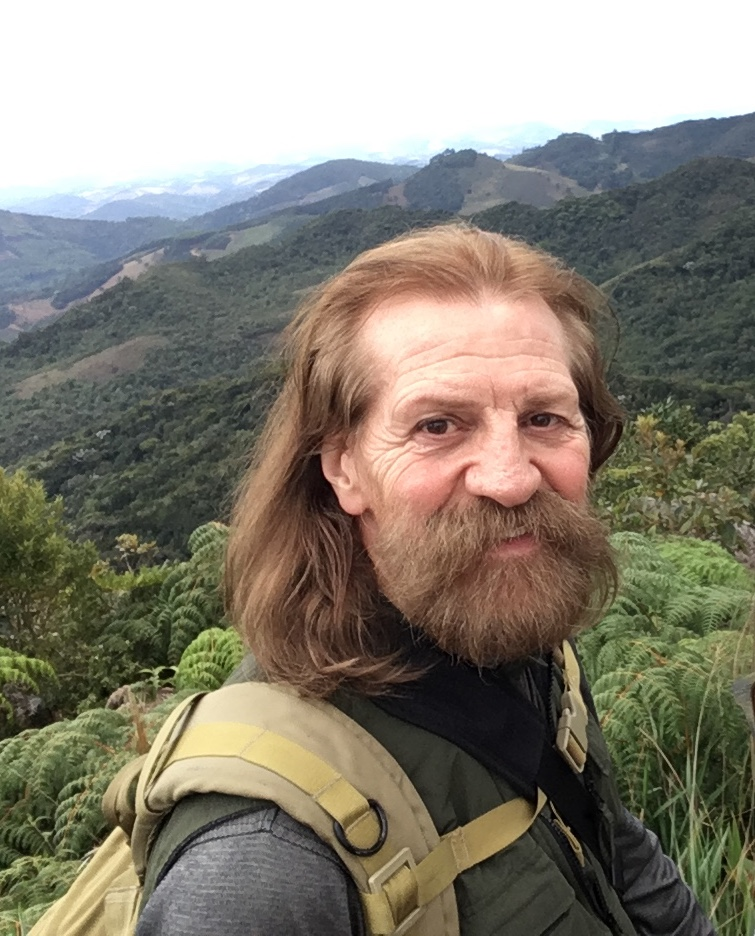
Sergio Rossetti Morosini, 2017

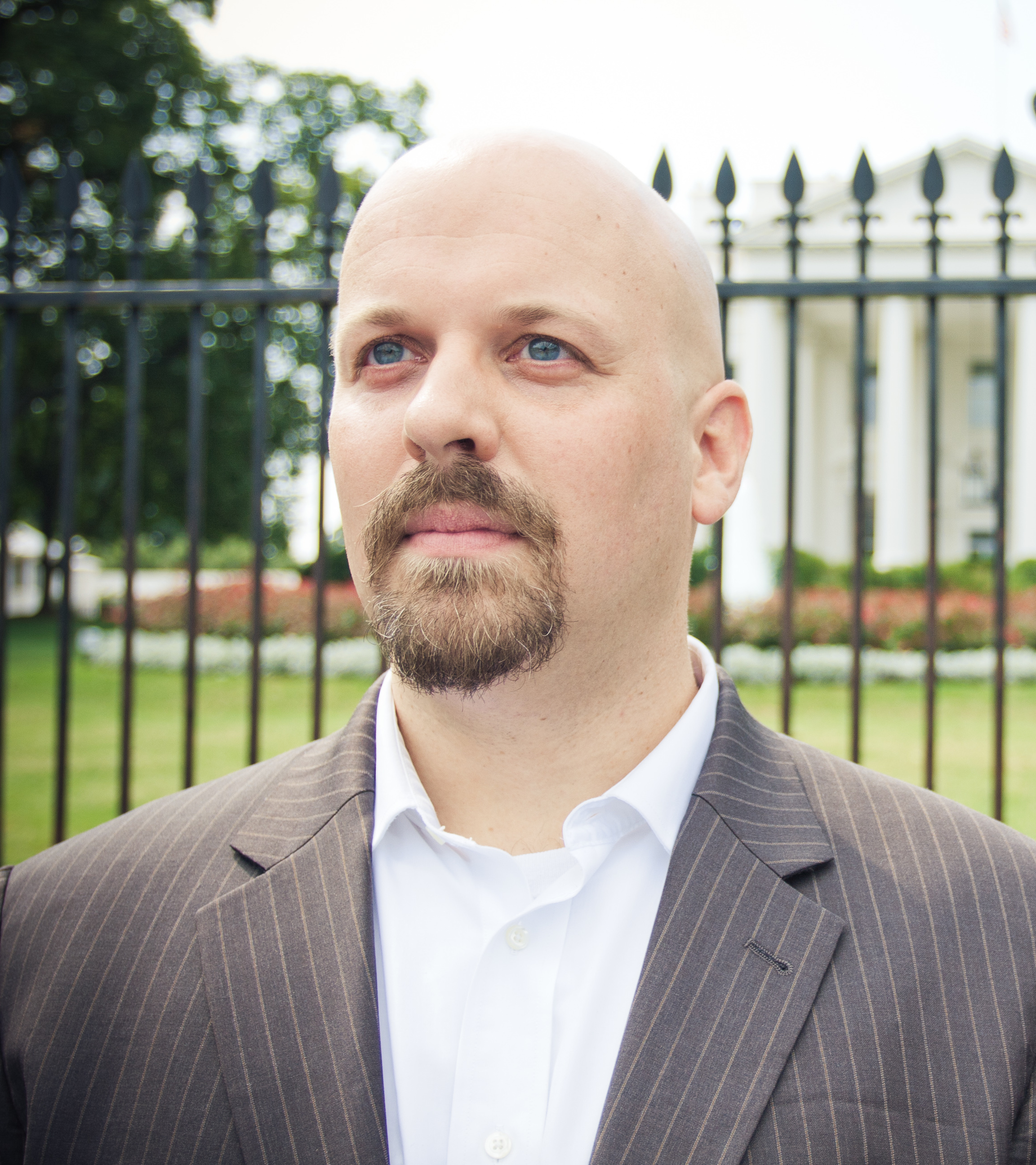
Phil Radford, 2011

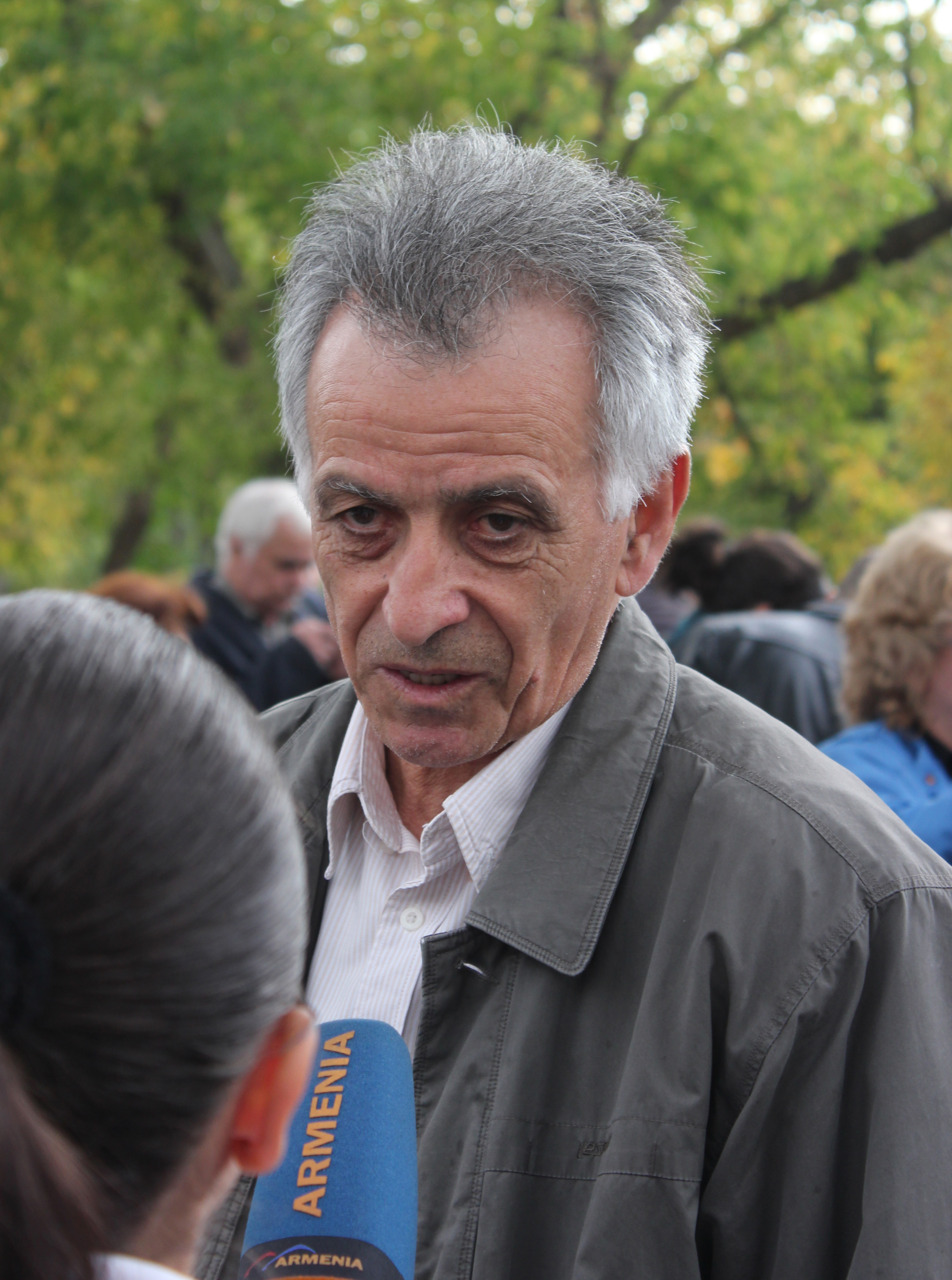
Hakob Sanasaryan campaignning against illegal construction of a new ore-processing facility in Sotk, 2011

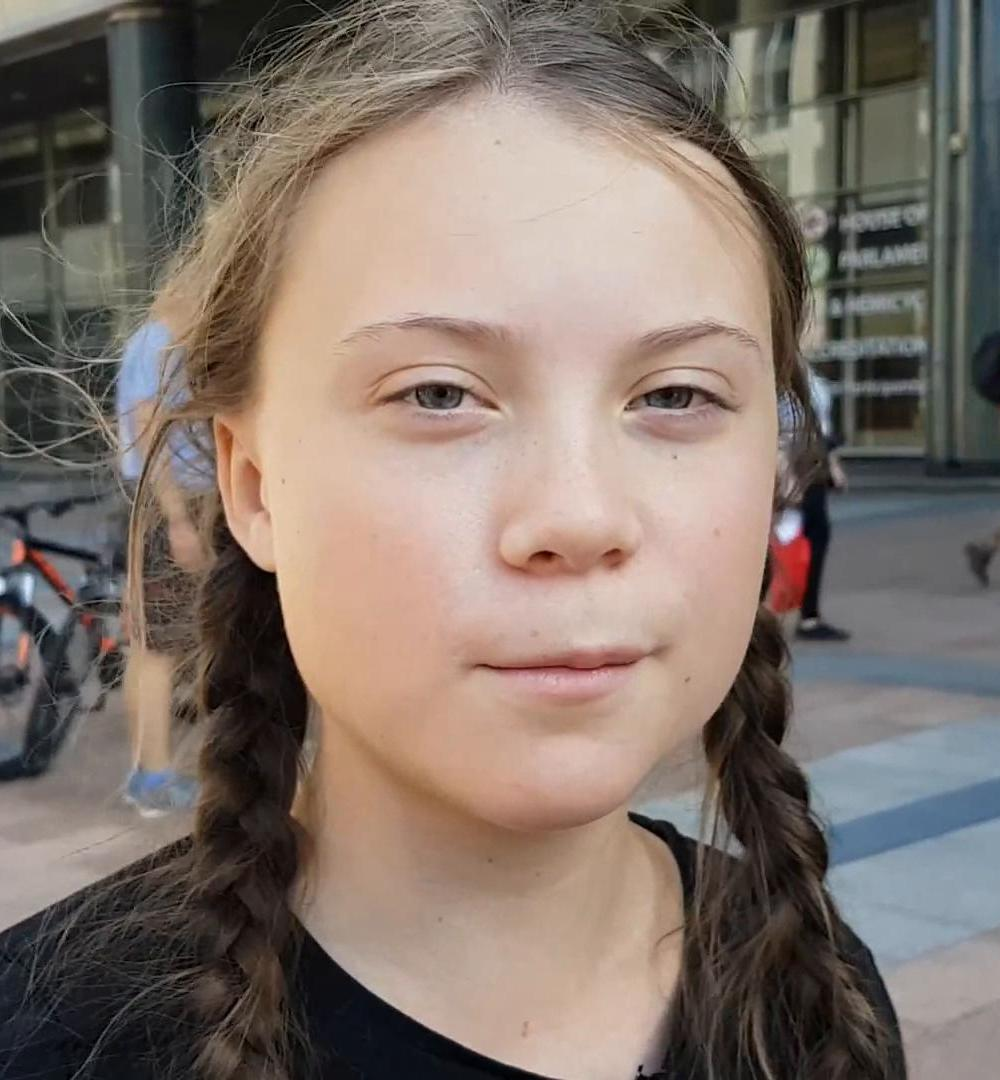
Greta Thunberg, 2018

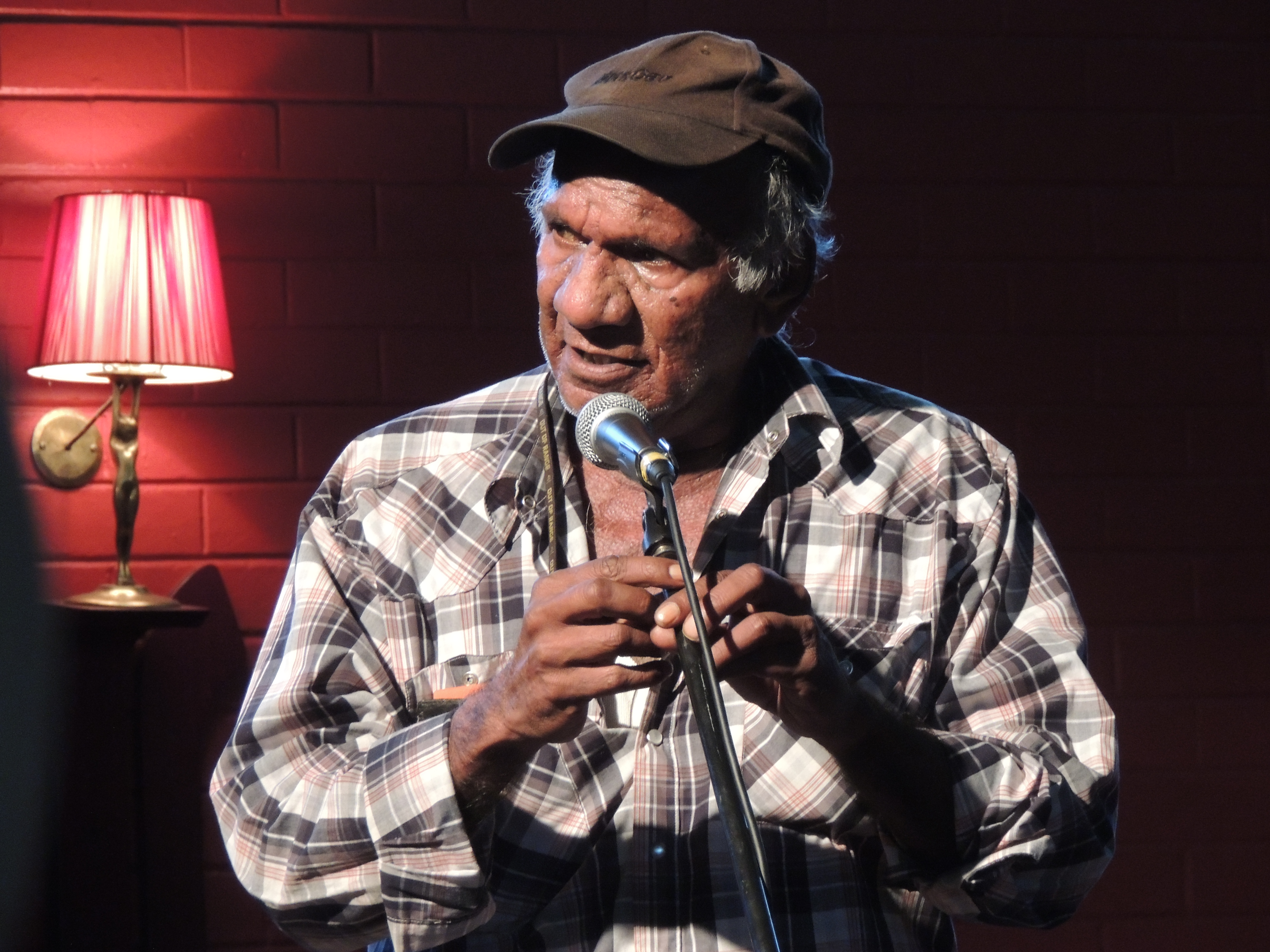
Kevin Buzzacott (Aboriginal activist) in Adelaide 2014

Some of the notable environmentalists who have been lobbying for environmental protection and conservation include:

== A ==
- Mariano Abarca (Mexican activist, assassinated in 2009)
- Edward Abbey (writer, activist, philosopher)
- Ansel Adams (photographer, writer, activist)
- Bayarjargal Agvaantseren (Mongolian conservationist)
- Qazi Kholiquzzaman Ahmad (environmental activist and economist of Bangladesh)
- David Attenborough (broadcaster, naturalist)
- John James Audubon (naturalist)

== B ==
- Sundarlal Bahuguna (environmentalist)
- Yusuf Baluch (Climate Justice Activist)
- Judi Bari (environmental activist)
- Vic Barrett (climate activist)
- Patriarch Bartholomew I (priest)
- Peter Michael Bauer (environmentalist, educator)
- Ed Begley, Jr. (Actor, environmentalist)
- David Bellamy (botanist)
- Thomas Berry (priest, historian, philosopher)
- Wendell Berry (farmer, philosopher)
- Chandi Prasad Bhatt (Gandhian environmentalist)
- Murray Bookchin (anarchist, philosopher, social ecologist)
- Wendy Bowman, Australian environmental activist
- Stewart Brand (writer, founder of Whole Earth Catalog)
- David Brower (writer, activist)
- Lester Brown (environmentalist)
- Jackson Browne (musician, environmentalist)
- Molly Burhans (cartographer, activist)
- Kevin Buzzacott (Aboriginal activist)

== C ==
- Helen Caldicott (medical doctor)
- Joan Carling (Filipino human rights defender)
- Rachel Carson (biologist, writer)
- Charles III (King of the Commonwealth Realms)
- Chevy Chase (comedian)
- Ng Cho-nam (Hong Kong environmentalist and associate professor of geography at University of Hong Kong))
- Bruce Cockburn (musician, activist)
- Barry Commoner (biologist, politician)
- Mike Cooley (engineer, trade unionist)
- Jacques-Yves Cousteau (explorer, ecologist)
- Jean-Michel Cousteau (French oceanographic explorer, environmentalist, educator, film producer)

== D ==
- Faiza Darkhani (c. 1992), Afghani environmentalist, women's rights activist, and educator
- John Denver (musician)
- Usha Desai (Indian physician and environmentalist)
- Leonardo DiCaprio (actor)
- Michelle Dilhara (actress)
- René Dubos (microbiologist)

== E ==
- Paul R. Ehrlich (population biologist)

== F ==
- Hans-Josef Fell (German Green Party member)
- Jane Fonda (actor)
- Morgan Freeman (actor, producer, and narrator)

== G ==
- Rolf Gardiner (rural revivalist)
- Peter Garrett (musician, politician)
- Al Gore (politician, former Vice President of the United States)

== H ==
- Tom Hanks (actor)
- James Hansen (scientist)
- Denis Hayes (environmentalist and solar power advocate)
- Nicolas Hulot (journalist and writer)
- Robert Hunter (journalist, co-founder and first president of Greenpeace)

== I ==
- Tetsunari Iida (sustainable energy advocate)

== J ==
- Lilia Isolina Java Tapayuri (Colombian indigenous leader)
- Jorian Jenks (English farmer)
- Kathy Jetn̄il-Kijiner (poet and climate activist)
- Huey D. Johnson (environmentalist)

== K ==
- Naomi Klein (writer, activist)

== L ==
- Winona LaDuke (environmentalist)
- Ursula LeGuin (writer, environmentalist)
- A. Carl Leopold (plant physiologist)
- Aldo Leopold (ecologist)
- Charles Lindbergh (aviator)
- James Lovelock (scientist)
- Amory Lovins (energy policy analyst)
- Hunter Lovins (environmentalist)
- Mark Lynas (journalist, activist)

== M ==
- Desmond Majekodunmi (environmentalist)
- Xiuhtezcatl Martinez (activist)
- Peter Max (graphic designer)
- Michael McCarthy (naturalist, newspaper journalist, newspaper columnist, and author)
- Bill McKibben (writer, activist)
- David McTaggart (activist)
- Mahesh Chandra Mehta (lawyer, environmentalist)
- Chico Mendes (activist)
- Nathan Méténier (French environmentalist)
- George Monbiot (journalist)
- Sergio Rossetti Morosini (naturalist, activist)
- Nyombi Morris (Ugandan youth environmental activist, CNN Environmentalist of tomorrow)
- John Muir (naturalist, activist)
- Luke Mullen (actor, filmmaker, environmentalist/activist)
- Hilda Murrell (botanist, activist)

== N ==
- Ralph Nader (activist)
- Vanessa Nakate (Ugandan youth climate justice activist, UN SDG 13 Young Leader)
- Seyyed Hossein Nasr (writer, philosopher)
- Gaylord Nelson (politician)
- Aniebiet Inyang Ntui (Nigerian professor and environmental advocate)

== O ==
- Okefenokee Joe (singer, songwriter, TV host, environmentalist)
- Yolanda Ortiz , Argentine environmentalist, chemist

== P ==
- Eugene Pandala (architect, environmentalist, natural and cultural heritage conservator)
- Medha Patkar (activist)
- Alan Pears (environmental consultant and energy efficiency pioneer)
- River Phoenix (actor, musician, activist)
- Jonathon Porritt (politician)

== Q ==
- Tahir Qureshi Mangrove Man or Mangroves Hero of Pakistan. Pakistani environmentalist.

== R ==
- Phil Radford (environmental, clean energy and democracy advocate, Greenpeace Executive Director)
- Bonnie Raitt (musician)
- Clovis Razafimalala (Malagasy environmentalist)
- Theodore Roosevelt (former President of the United States)

== S ==
- Hakob Sanasaryan (biochemist, activist)
- Ken Saro-Wiwa (writer, television producer, activist)
- Johanna Segovia (marine ecologist)
- Shimon Schwarzschild (writer, activist)
- Vandana Shiva (environmental activist)
- Wallace Stegner (writer, environmentalist)
- Swami Sundaranand (yogi, photographer, author and mountaineer)
- David Suzuki (scientist, broadcaster)
- Candice Swanepoel (model)

== T ==
- Shōzō Tanaka (politician and activist)
- Saalumarada Thimmakka
- Henry David Thoreau (writer, philosopher)
- Greta Thunberg (activist)
- Rebecca Harrell Tickell (filmmaker, actress, activist)

== V ==
- Jo Valentine (politician and activist)

== W ==
- Harvey Wasserman (journalist, activist)
- Paul Watson (activist and lecturer)
- Franz Weber (environmentalist and animal welfare activist)
- Henry Williamson (naturalist, writer)
- Wangari Maathai (Kenyan environmentalist, Nobel Laureate)
