= Environmentalism =

Philosophy about Earth protection

Environmentalism is a broad philosophy, ideology, and social movement about supporting life, habitats, and surroundings. While environmentalism focuses on the environmental and nature-related aspects of green ideology and politics, ecologism combines the ideology of social ecology and environmentalism. Ecologism is a term more commonly used in continental European languages, while environmentalism is more commonly used in English, but the words have slightly different connotations.

Environmentalism advocates the preservation, restoration and improvement of the natural environment and critical earth system elements or processes such as the climate, and may be referred to as a movement to control pollution or protect plant and animal diversity. For this reason, concepts such as a land ethics, environmental ethics, biodiversity, ecology, and the biophilia hypothesis figure predominantly. The environmentalist movement encompasses various approaches to addressing environmental issues, including free market environmentalism, evangelical environmentalism, and the environmental conservation movement.

At its crux, environmentalism is an attempt to balance relations between humans and the various natural systems on which they depend in such a way that all the components are accorded a proper degree of sustainability. The exact measures and outcomes of this balance is controversial and there are many different ways for environmental concerns to be expressed in practice. Environmentalism and environmental concerns are often represented by the colour green, but this association has been appropriated by the marketing industries for the tactic known as greenwashing.

Environmentalism is opposed by anti-environmentalism, which says that the Earth is less fragile than some environmentalists maintain, and portrays environmentalism as overreacting to the human contribution to climate change or opposing human advancement.

== Definitions ==
Environmentalism denotes a social movement that seeks to influence the political process by lobbying, activism, and education in order to protect natural resources and ecosystems. Environmentalism as a movement covers broad areas of institutional oppression, including for example: consumption of ecosystems and natural resources into waste, dumping waste into disadvantaged communities, air pollution, water pollution, weak infrastructure, exposure of organic life to toxins. Because of these divisions, the environmental movement can be categorized into these primary focuses: environmental science, environmental activism, environmental advocacy, and environmental justice.

An environmentalist is a someone who fights to protect the natural environment. This may include supporting practices such as informed consumption, conservation initiatives, investment in renewable resources, improved efficiencies in the materials economy, transitioning to new accounting paradigms such as ecological economics, renewing and revitalizing our connections with non-human life or even opting to have one less child to reduce consumption and pressure on resources.

In various ways (for example, grassroots activism and protests), environmentalists and environmental organizations seek to give the natural world a stronger voice in human affairs.

In general terms, environmentalists advocate the sustainable management of resources, and the protection (and restoration, when necessary) of the natural environment through changes in public policy and individual behaviour. In its recognition of humanity as a participant in ecosystems, the movement is centered around ecology, health, and human rights.

The environmental movement (a term that sometimes includes the conservation and green movements) is a diverse scientific, social, and political movement. Though the movement is represented by a range of organizations, because of the inclusion of environmentalism in the classroom curriculum, the environmental movement has a younger demographic than is common in other social movements (see green seniors).

== History ==
=== Ancient history and middle ages ===
A concern for environmental protection has recurred in diverse forms, in different parts of the world, throughout history. The earliest ideas of environmental protectionism can be found in Jainism, a religion from ancient India revived by Mahavira in the 6th century BC. Jainism offers a view that is in many ways compatible with core values associated with environmental activism, such as the protection of life by nonviolence, which could form a strong ecological ethos for global protection of the environment. Mahavira's teachings on the symbiosis between all living beings—as well as the five elements of earth, water, air, fire, and space—are core to environmental thought today.

In West Asia, the Caliph Abu Bakr in the 630s AD commanded his army to "Bring no harm to the trees, nor burn them with fire," and to "Slay not any of the enemy's flock, save for your food." Various Islamic medical treatises during the 9th to 13th centuries dealt with environmentalism and environmental science, including the issue of pollution. The authors of such treatises included Al-Kindi, Qusta ibn Luqa, Al-Razi, Ibn Al-Jazzar, al-Tamimi, al-Masihi, Avicenna, Ali ibn Ridwan, Ibn Jumay, Isaac Israeli ben Solomon, Abd-el-latif, Ibn al-Quff, and Ibn al-Nafis. Their works covered a number of subjects related to pollution, such as air pollution, water pollution, soil contamination, and the mishandling of municipal solid waste. They also included assessments of certain localities' environmental impact.

Within the religious tradition of the Catholic church, the friar Francis of Assisi gave expression to a profound mystical reverence for the natural environment as early as 1224. In his lyrical poem Canticle of the Sun Francis offered both an ethical and spiritual context for the practice of environmentalism. He extolled mankind to affirm a divine presence within the natural realm while calling into question mankind's dominance of the environment, personifying God's living presence in his creation and urging humanity to offer thanksgiving for that presence by extending praise through "...Sister Mother Earth, who sustains us and governs us and who produces varied fruits with coloured flowers and herbs.. Praised be You, my Lord, through Brother Wind, and through the air, cloudy and serene, and every kind of weather through which you give sustenance to Your creatures."

In Europe, King Edward I of England banned the burning and sale of "sea-coal" in 1272 by proclamation in London, after its smoke had become a prevalent annoyance throughout the city. This fuel, common in London due to the local scarcity of wood, was given this early name because it could be found washed up on some shores, from where it was carted away on a wheelbarrow. King Philip II of Spain was noted by his love of nature, which according to historian Henry Kamen, turned him into one of the first ecologist rulers in European history. He issued orders to conserve the Spanish forests, noting in 1582 the great disservice they would do to future generations by depleting them.

=== Industrial Revolution ===
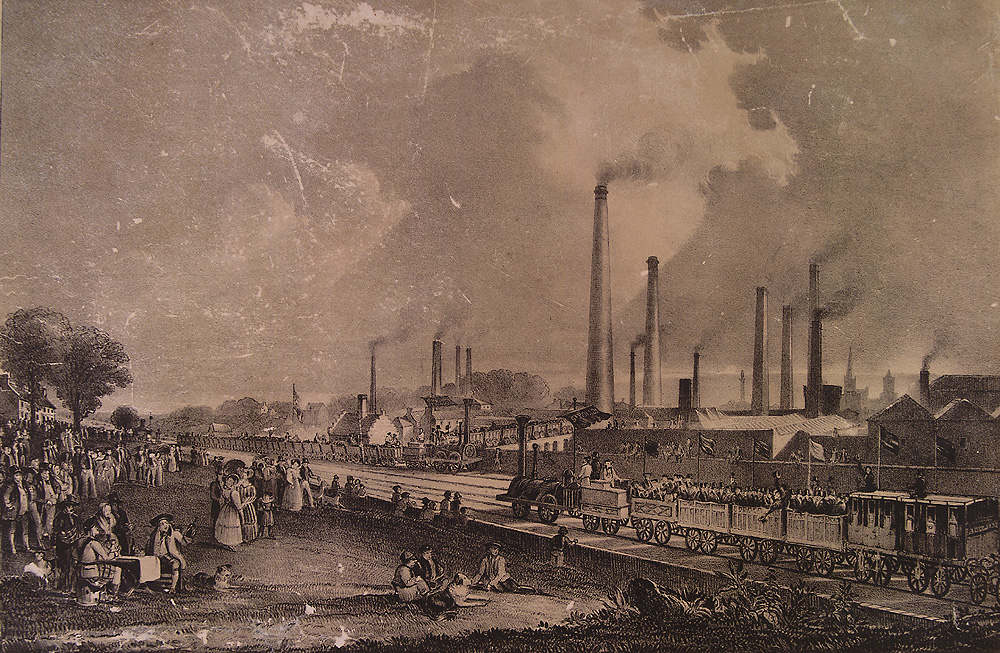
Levels of air pollution rose during the Industrial Revolution, sparking the first modern environmental laws to be passed in the mid-19th century.

At the advent of steam and electricity the muse of history holds her nose and shuts her eyes (H. G. Wells 1918).

The origins of the environmental movement lay in the response to increasing levels of smoke pollution in the atmosphere during the Industrial Revolution. The emergence of great factories and the concomitant immense growth in coal consumption gave rise to an unprecedented level of air pollution in industrial centers; after 1900 the large volume of industrial chemical discharges added to the growing load of untreated human waste. The first large-scale, modern environmental laws came in the form of Britain's Alkali Acts, passed in 1863, to regulate the deleterious air pollution (gaseous hydrochloric acid) given off by the Leblanc process, used to produce soda ash.

In industrial cities, local experts and reformers, especially after 1890, took the lead in identifying environmental degradation and pollution, and initiating grass-roots movements to demand and achieve reforms. Typically the highest priority went to water and air pollution.

=== 19th century ===
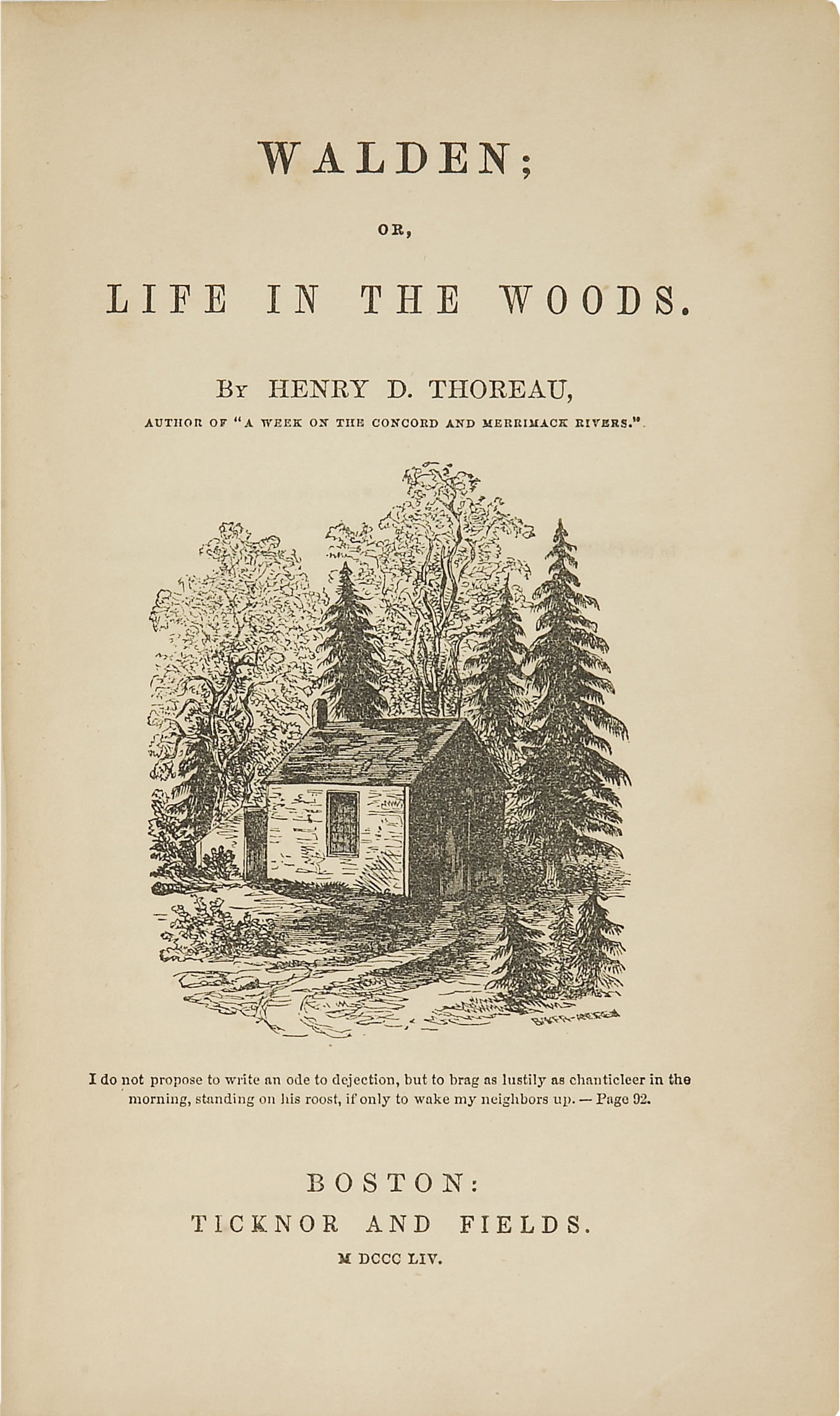
Original title page of Walden by Henry David Thoreau

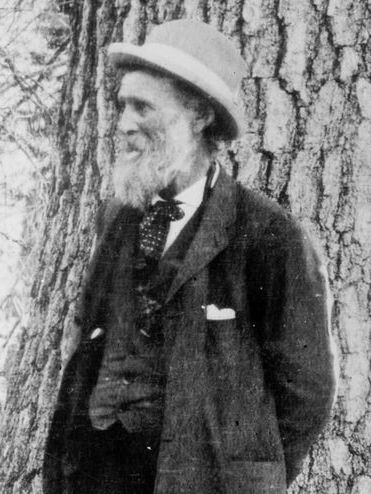
John Muir also known as "John of the Mountains" and "Father of the National Parks", was a Scottish-born American naturalist, author, environmental philosopher, botanist, zoologist, glaciologist, and early advocate for the preservation of wilderness in the United States.

The late 19th century saw the passage of the first wildlife conservation laws. The zoologist Alfred Newton published a series of investigations into the Desirability of establishing a 'Close-time' for the preservation of indigenous animals between 1872 and 1903. His advocacy for legislation to protect animals from hunting during the mating season led to the formation of the Royal Society for the Protection of Birds and influenced the passage of the Sea Birds Preservation Act in 1869 as the first nature protection law in the world.

The movement in the United States began in the late 19th century, out of concerns for protecting the natural resources of the West, with individuals such as John Muir and Henry David Thoreau making key philosophical contributions. Thoreau was interested in peoples' relationship with nature and studied this by living close to nature in a simple life. He published his experiences in the book Walden, which argues that people should become intimately close with nature. Muir came to believe in nature's inherent right, especially after spending time hiking in Yosemite Valley and studying both the ecology and geology. He successfully lobbied congress to form Yosemite National Park and went on to set up the Sierra Club in 1892. The conservationist principles as well as the belief in an inherent right of nature were to become the bedrock of modern environmentalism.

The prevailing belief regarding the origins of early environmentalism suggests that it emerged as a local response to the adverse impacts of industrialization in Western nations and communities. In terms of conservation efforts, there is a widespread view that the conservation movement began as a predominantly elite concern in North America, focusing on the preservation of local natural areas. A less prevailing view, however, attributes the roots of early environmentalism to a growing public concern about the influence of Western economic forces, particularly in connection with colonization, on tropical environments. Richard Grove, in a 1990 publication, points out that little attention has been given to the significance of the colonial experience, particularly the European colonial experience, in shaping early European environmentalism.

=== 20th century ===
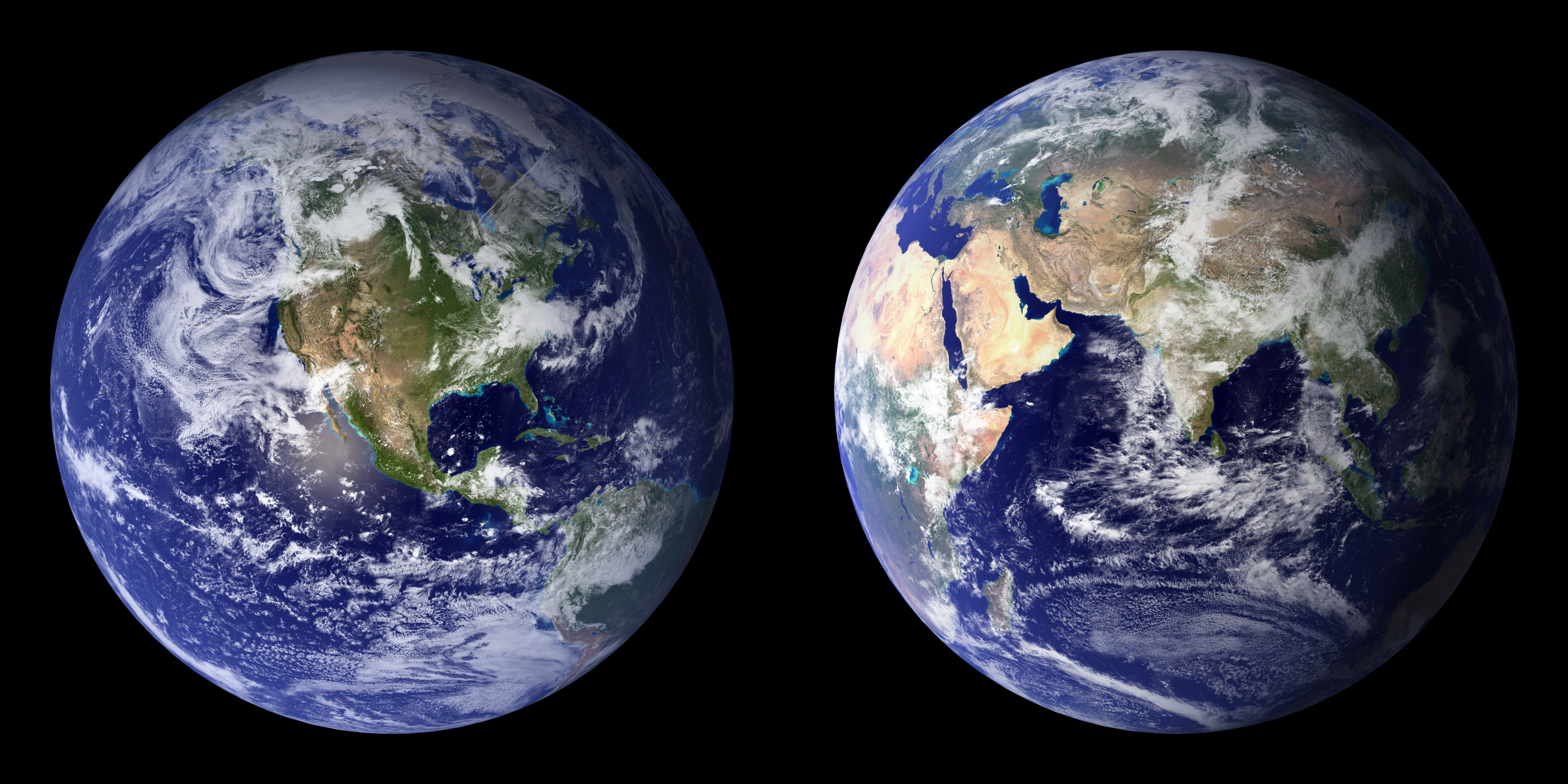
Photos of the Earth from outer space provided both new insights and new reasons for concern over Earth's seemingly small and unique place in the universe (composite images of Earth generated by NASA in 2001 (left) and 2002 (right)).

In 1916, the National Park Service was founded by U.S. President Woodrow Wilson. Pioneers of the movement called for more efficient and professional management of natural resources. They fought for reform because they believed the destruction of forests, fertile soil, minerals, wildlife, and water resources would lead to the downfall of society.

"The conservation of natural resources is the fundamental problem. Unless we solve that problem, it will avail us little to solve all others".

— Theodore Roosevelt (4 October 1907)

In the 1950s, 1960s, and 1970s, several events illustrated the magnitude of environmental damage caused by humans. In 1954, a hydrogen bomb test at Bikini Atoll exposed the 23-man crew of the Japanese fishing vessel Lucky Dragon 5 to radioactive fallout. The incident is known as Castle Bravo, the largest thermonuclear device ever detonated by the United States and the first in a series of high-yield thermonuclear weapon design tests. In 1967 the oil tanker Torrey Canyon ran aground off the coast of Cornwall, and in 1969 oil spilled from an offshore well in California's Santa Barbara Channel. In 1971, the conclusion of a lawsuit in Japan drew international attention to the effects of decades of mercury poisoning on the people of Minamata.

At the same time, emerging scientific research drew new attention to existing and hypothetical threats to the environment and humanity. Among them were Paul R. Ehrlich, whose book The Population Bomb (1968) revived Malthusian concerns about the impact of exponential population growth. Biologist Barry Commoner generated a debate about growth, affluence and "flawed technology." Additionally, an association of scientists and political leaders known as the Club of Rome published their report The Limits to Growth in 1972, and drew attention to the growing pressure on natural resources from human activities.

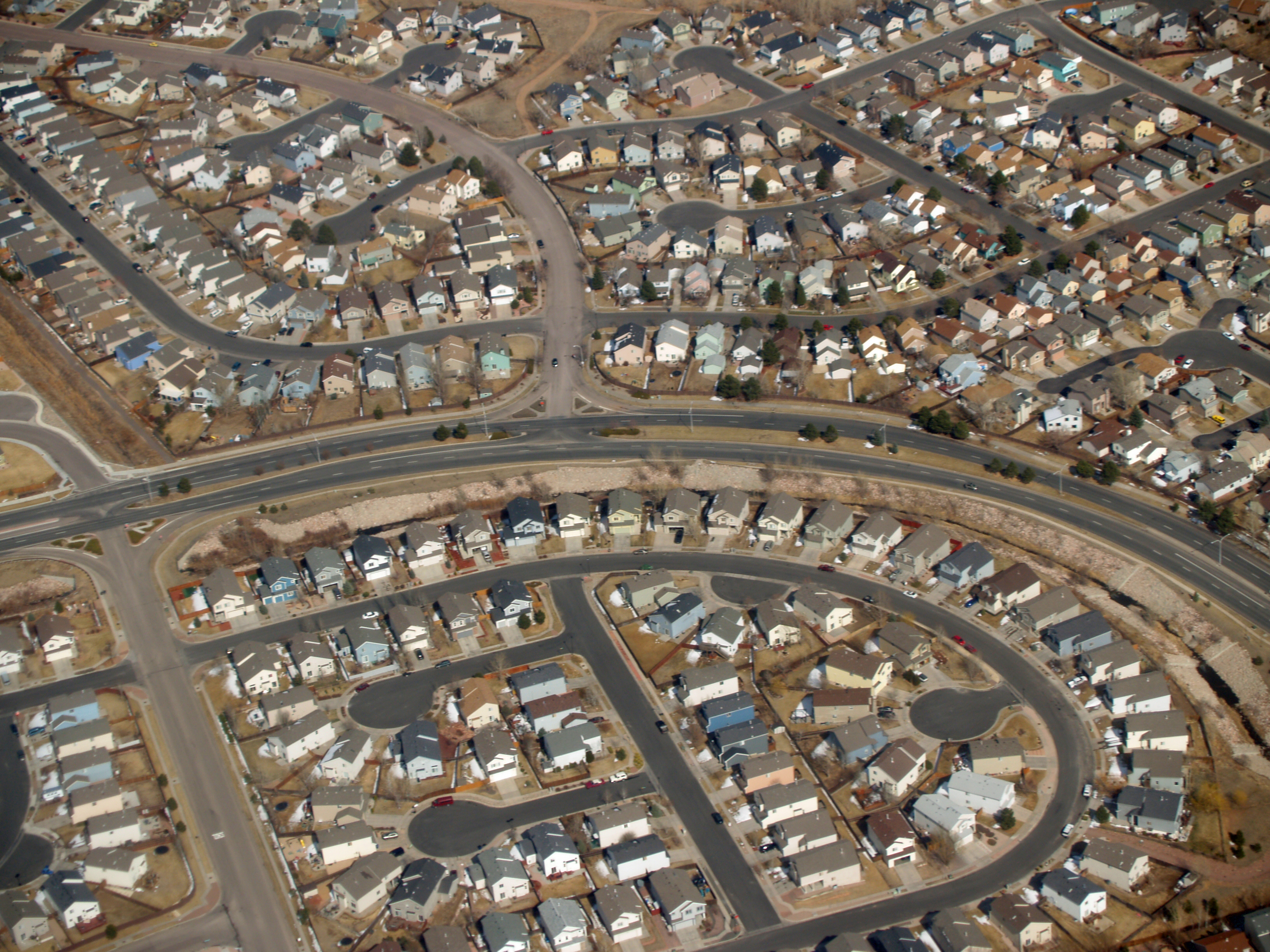
In the United States and several other countries, the boom was manifested in suburban development and urban sprawl, aided by automobile ownership.

Another major literary force in the promotion of the environmental movement was Rachel Carson's 1962 book Silent Spring about declining bird populations due to DDT, an insecticide, pollutant, and man's attempts to control nature through the use of synthetic substances. Her core message for her readers was to identify the complex and fragile ecosystem and the threats facing the population. Her book sold over two million copies.

The book cataloged the environmental impacts of the indiscriminate spraying of DDT in the US and questioned the logic of releasing large amounts of chemicals into the environment without fully understanding their effects on human health and ecology. The book suggested that DDT and other pesticides may cause cancer and that their agricultural use was a threat to wildlife, particularly birds.

The resulting public concern led to the creation of the United States Environmental Protection Agency in 1970 which subsequently banned the agricultural use of DDT in the US in 1972. The limited use of DDT in disease vector control continues to this day in certain parts of the world and remains controversial. The book's legacy was to produce a far greater awareness of environmental issues and interest into how people affect the environment. With this new interest in environment came interest in problems such as air pollution and petroleum spills, and environmental interest grew. New pressure groups formed, notably Greenpeace and Friends of the Earth (US), as well as notable local organizations such as the Wyoming Outdoor Council, which was founded in 1967. Greenpeace was created in 1971 as an organization that believed that political advocacy and legislation were ineffective or inefficient solutions and supported non-violent action. From 1962 to 1998, the environmental movement founded 772 national organizations in the United States.

In the 1970s, the environmental movement gained rapid speed around the world as a productive outgrowth of the counterculture movement.

The world's first political parties to campaign on a predominantly environmental platform were the United Tasmania Group of Tasmania, Australia, and the Values Party of New Zealand. The first green party in Europe was the Popular Movement for the Environment, founded in 1972 in the Swiss canton of Neuchâtel. The first national green party in Europe was PEOPLE, founded in Britain in February 1973, which eventually turned into the Ecology Party, and then the Green Party.

Protection of the environment also became important in the developing world; the Chipko movement was formed in India under the influence of Mahatma Gandhi and led by Chandi Prasad Bhatt, Sunderlal Bahuguna and some local leaders. They set up peaceful resistance to deforestation by literally hugging trees (leading to the term "tree huggers"). Chipko literally translates as an open call to hug, and has become a widely recognised and oft replicated action in public protests to save trees. Their peaceful methods of protest and slogan "ecology is permanent economy" were very influential.

Another milestone in the movement was the creation of Earth Day. The first Earth Day was celebrated on April 22, 1970. It was created to give awareness to environmental issues. On 21 March 1971, United Nations Secretary-General U Thant spoke of a spaceship Earth on Earth Day, hereby referring to the ecosystem services the earth supplies to us, and hence our obligation to protect it (and with it, ourselves). Earth Day is now coordinated globally by the Earth Day Network, and is celebrated in more than 192 countries every year. Its founder, former Wisconsin Senator Gaylord Nelson, was inspired to create this day of environmental education and awareness after seeing the oil spill off the coast of Santa Barbara in 1969.

In 1972, the United Nations Conference on the Human Environment was held in Stockholm, and for the first time united the representatives of multiple governments in discussion relating to the state of the global environment. It marked a turning point in the development of international environmental politics. This conference led directly to the creation of government environmental agencies and the UN Environment Program.

By the mid-1970s, many felt that people were on the edge of environmental catastrophe. The back-to-the-land movement started to form and ideas of environmental ethics joined with anti-Vietnam War sentiments and other political issues. These individuals lived outside normal society and started to take on some of the more radical environmental theories such as deep ecology. Around this time more mainstream environmentalism was starting to show force with the signing of the Endangered Species Act in 1973 and the formation of CITES in 1975. Significant amendments were also enacted to the United States Clean Air Act and Clean Water Act.

=== 21st century ===
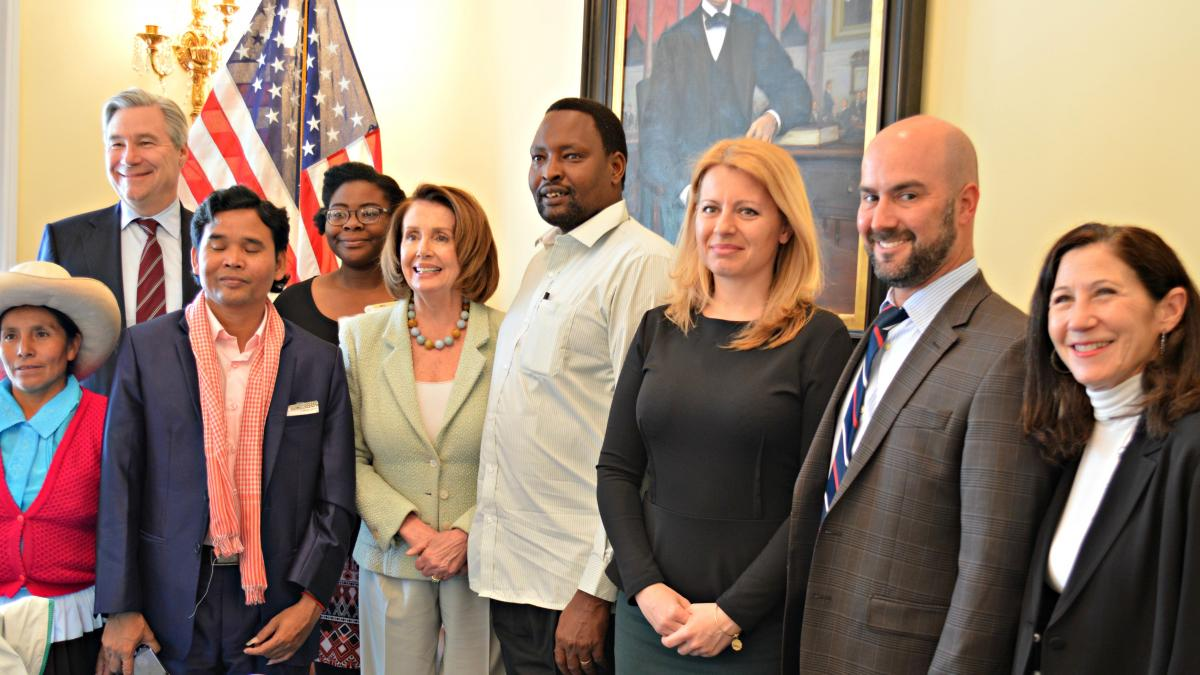
Nancy Pelosi meets with the 2016 Goldman Environmental Prize recipients – six individuals who have made a profound impact in their communities and throughout the world by fighting for environmental justice.

On an international level, concern for the environment was the subject of a United Nations Conference on the Human Environment in Stockholm in 1972, attended by 113 nations. Out of this meeting developed the United Nations Environment Programme (UNEP) and the follow-up United Nations Conference on Environment and Development in 1992. Other international organizations in support of environmental policies development include the Commission for Environmental Cooperation (as part of NAFTA), the European Environment Agency (EEA), and the Intergovernmental Panel on Climate Change (IPCC).

Environmentalism continues to evolve to face up to new issues such as global warming, overpopulation, genetic engineering, and plastic pollution. However, research in 2013 showed a precipitous decline in the United States' public's interest in 19 different areas of environmental concern.

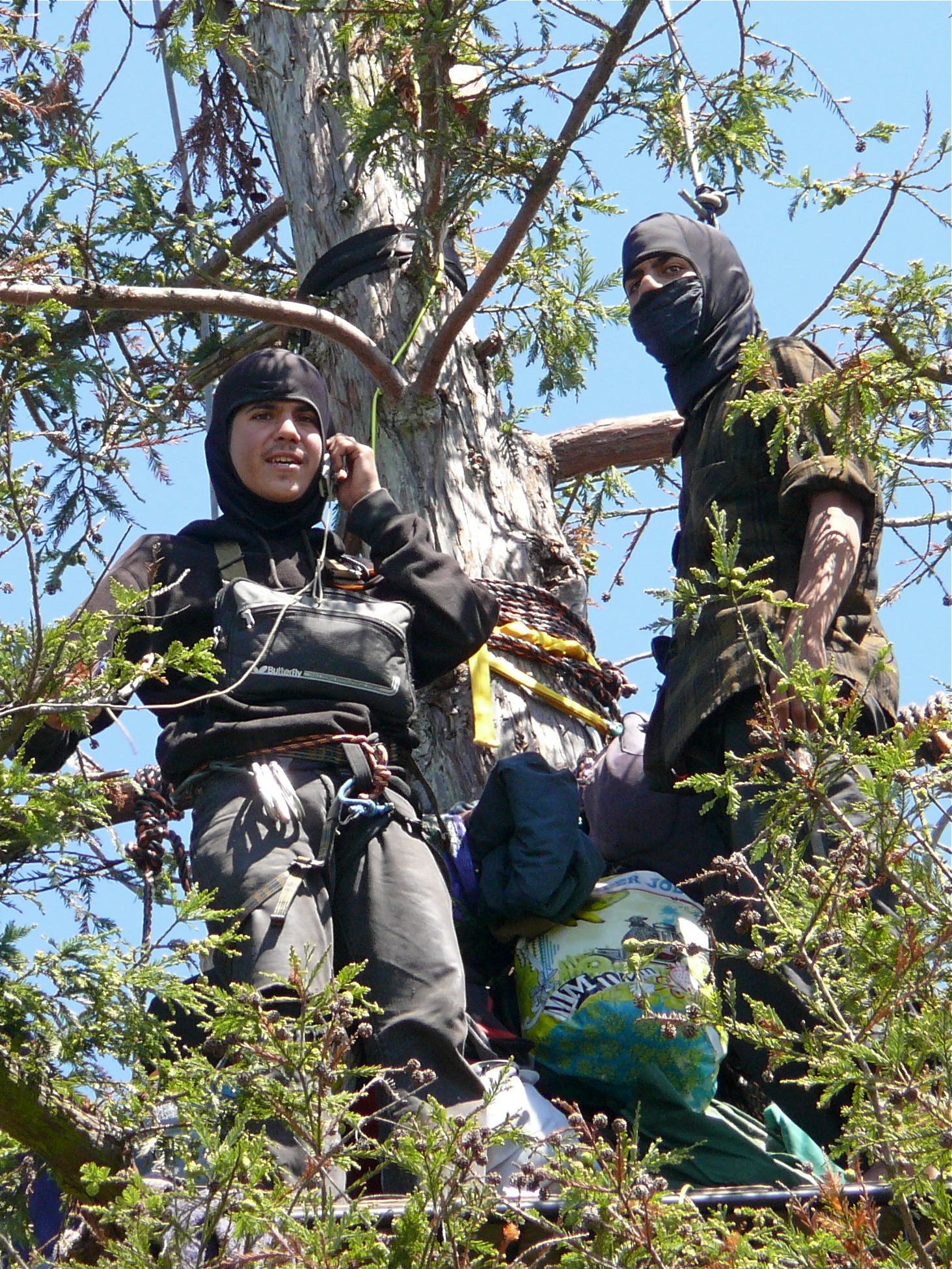
Demonstrators in a tree at the Berkeley oak grove protest in 2008

Since the 2000s, the environmental movement has increasingly focused on climate change as one of the top issues. As concerns about climate change moved more into the mainstream, from the connections drawn between global warming and Hurricane Katrina to Al Gore's 2006 documentary film An Inconvenient Truth, more and more environmental groups refocused their efforts. In the United States, 2007 witnessed the largest grassroots environmental demonstration in years, Step It Up 2007, with rallies in over 1,400 communities and all 50 states for real global warming solutions.

Publicity and widespread organizing of school strike for the climate began after Swedish schoolgirl Greta Thunberg staged a protest in August 2018 outside the Swedish Riksdag (parliament). The September 2019 climate strikes were likely the largest climate strikes in world history. In 2019, a survey found that climate breakdown is viewed as the most important issue facing the world in seven out of the eight countries surveyed.

Many religious organizations and individual churches now have programs and activities dedicated to environmental issues. The religious movement is often supported by interpretation of scriptures. In fact, some contemporary religious movements are directly inspired by environmental ideals, such as the Brazil-founded movement known as Harmoniismo.

== Themes ==
One notable strain of environmentalism comes from the philosophy of the conservation movement. Conservationists are concerned with leaving the environment in a better state than the condition they found it distinct from human interaction. The conservation movement is associated with the early parts of the environmental movement of the 19th and 20th century.

The adoption of environmentalism into a distinct political ideology led to the development of political parties called "green parties", typically with a leftist political approach to overlapping issues of environmental and social wellbeing (green politics).

=== Bright green environmentalism ===
Bright green environmentalism is an environmental philosophy and movement that emphasizes the use of advanced technology, social innovation, eco-innovation, and sustainable design to address environmental challenges. This approach contrasts with more traditional forms of environmentalism that may advocate for reduced consumption or a return to simpler lifestyles.

Light green, and dark green environmentalism are yet other sub-movements, respectively distinguished by seeing environmentalism as a lifestyle choice (light greens), and promoting reduction in human numbers and/or a relinquishment of technology (dark greens).

=== Evangelical environmentalism ===
Evangelical environmentalism is an environmental movement in the United States in which some Evangelicals have emphasized biblical mandates concerning humanity's role as steward and subsequent responsibility for the care taking of Creation. While the movement has focused on different environmental issues, it is best known for its focus of addressing climate action from a biblically grounded theological perspective. This movement is controversial among some non-Christian environmentalists due to its rooting in a specific religion.

=== Free market environmentalism ===
Free market environmentalism is a theory that argues that the free market, property rights, and tort law provide the best tools to preserve the health and sustainability of the environment. It considers environmental stewardship to be natural, as well as the expulsion of polluters and other aggressors through individual and class action.

=== Labor environmentalism ===
The concept of labor environmentalism refers to the efforts of trade unions to create environmental policies, advocate for environmental issues, and collaborate with environmental groups. Trade unions and international organizations such as the International Labour Organization face the dilemma of having to "navigate the structures of global capitalism and the economic growth paradigm, on the one hand, and the global ecological crisis on the other hand".

To promote green jobs, trade unions developed the concept of a just transition. This concept, for example in the context of climate change, focuses on the connection between energy transition and equitable approaches to decarbonization that support broader development goals.

=== Radical environmentalism ===
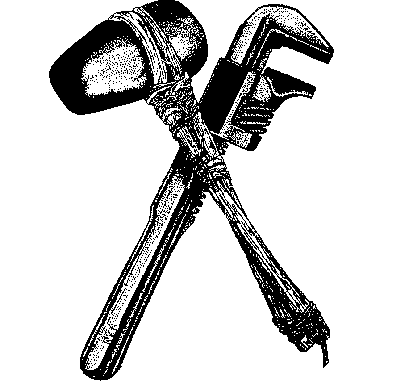
The symbol of Earth First! is a monkey wrench and stone hammer.

Radical environmentalism is a grass-roots branch of the larger environmental movement that emerged from an ecocentrism-based frustration with the co-option of mainstream environmentalism.

== Organizations ==
Environmental organizations can be global, regional, national or local; they can be government-run or private (NGO). Environmentalist activity exists in almost every country. Moreover, groups dedicated to community development and social justice also focus on environmental concerns.

Some US environmental organisations, among them the Natural Resources Defense Council and the Environmental Defense Fund, specialize in bringing lawsuits (a tactic seen as particularly useful in that country). Other groups, such as the US-based National Wildlife Federation, Earth Day, National Cleanup Day, the Nature Conservancy, and The Wilderness Society, and global groups like the World Wide Fund for Nature and Friends of the Earth, disseminate information, participate in public hearings, lobby, stage demonstrations, and may purchase land for preservation.

Community-led initiatives such as Buz Stop Boys have contributed to improving urban sanitation in Accra.

More radical organizations, such as Greenpeace, Earth First!, and the Earth Liberation Front, have more directly opposed actions they regard as environmentally harmful. The Federal Bureau of Investigation (FBI) has determined some of these groups as a terrorism threat.

== Criticism ==
When environmentalism first became popular during the early 20th century, the focus was wilderness protection and wildlife preservation. These goals reflected the interests of the movement's initial, primarily white middle and upper class supporters, including through viewing preservation and protection via a lens that failed to appreciate the centuries-long work of indigenous communities who had lived without ushering in the types of environmental devastation these settler colonial "environmentalists" now sought to mitigate. The actions of many mainstream environmental organizations still reflect these early principles. Numerous low-income minorities felt isolated or negatively impacted by the movement, exemplified by the Southwest Organizing Project's (SWOP) Letter to the Group of 10, a letter sent to major environmental organizations by several local environmental justice activists. The letter argued that the environmental movement was so concerned about cleaning up and preserving nature that it ignored the negative side-effects that doing so caused communities nearby, namely less job growth. In addition, the NIMBY movement has transferred locally unwanted land uses (LULUs) from middle-class neighborhoods to poor communities with large minority populations. Therefore, vulnerable communities with fewer political opportunities are more often exposed to hazardous waste and toxins. This has resulted in the PIBBY principle, or at least the PIMBY (Place-in-minorities'-backyard), as supported by the United Church of Christ's study in 1987.

As a result, some minorities have viewed the environmental movement as elitist. Environmental elitism manifested itself in three different forms:

1. Compositional – Environmentalists are from the middle and upper class.
2. Ideological – The reforms benefit the movement's supporters but impose costs on nonparticipants.
3. Impact – The reforms have "regressive social impacts". They disproportionately benefit environmentalists and harm underrepresented populations.

Many environmentalists believe that human interference with 'nature' should be restricted or minimised as a matter of urgency (for the sake of life, or the planet, or just for the benefit of the human species), whereas environmental skeptics and anti-environmentalists do not believe that there is such a need. One can also regard oneself as an environmentalist and believe that human 'interference' with 'nature' should be increased. Nevertheless, there is a risk that the shift from emotional environmentalism into the technical management of natural resources and hazards could decrease the touch of humans with nature, leading to less concern with environment preservation. Increasingly, typical conservation rhetoric is being replaced with restoration approaches and larger landscape initiatives that seek to create more holistic impacts.

Others seek a balance that involves both caring deeply for the environment while letting science guide human actions affecting it. Such an approach would avoid the emotionalism which, for example, anti-GMO activism has been criticized for, and protect the integrity of science. Planting trees, for another example, can be emotionally satisfying but should also involve being conscious of ecological concerns such as the effect on water cycles and the use of nonnative, potentially invasive species.

=== Anti-environmentalism ===
Anti-environmentalism is a set of ideas and actions that oppose environmentalism as a whole or specific environmental policies or environmental initiatives. Criticism of environmentalism originates from multiple ideologies, interest groups, and political objectives. Oppositions can take the form of an organized countermovement, aimed at scientific claims about climate change, environmental policies and regulations, in both national or international spheres. Anti-environmentalist actors may include workers in industries and companies that are threatened by environmental policies, and anti-environmentalist think tanks.

The reasons for opposition vary. They range from economic interests to ideological and political positions that are hostile towards environmental social and political change, including critical perspectives that encourage environmentalists to think about more inclusive approaches toward sustainability.

== Environmentalists ==
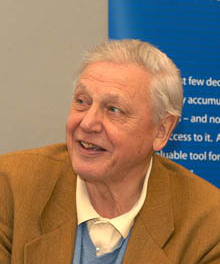
Sir David Attenborough in May 2003

An environmentalist is a person who protects the environment. An environmentalist can be considered a supporter of the goals of the environmental movement, "a political and ethical movement that seeks to improve and protect the quality of the natural environment through changes to environmentally harmful human activities". An environmentalist is engaged in or believes in the philosophy of environmentalism or one of the related philosophies.

The environmental movement has a number of subcommunities, with different approaches and focuses – each developing distinct movements and identities. Environmentalists are sometimes referred to by critics with informal or derogatory terms such as "greenie" and "tree-hugger", with some members of the public associating the most radical environmentalists with these derogatory terms. Some of the notable environmentalists who have been advocating for environmental protection and conservation include:

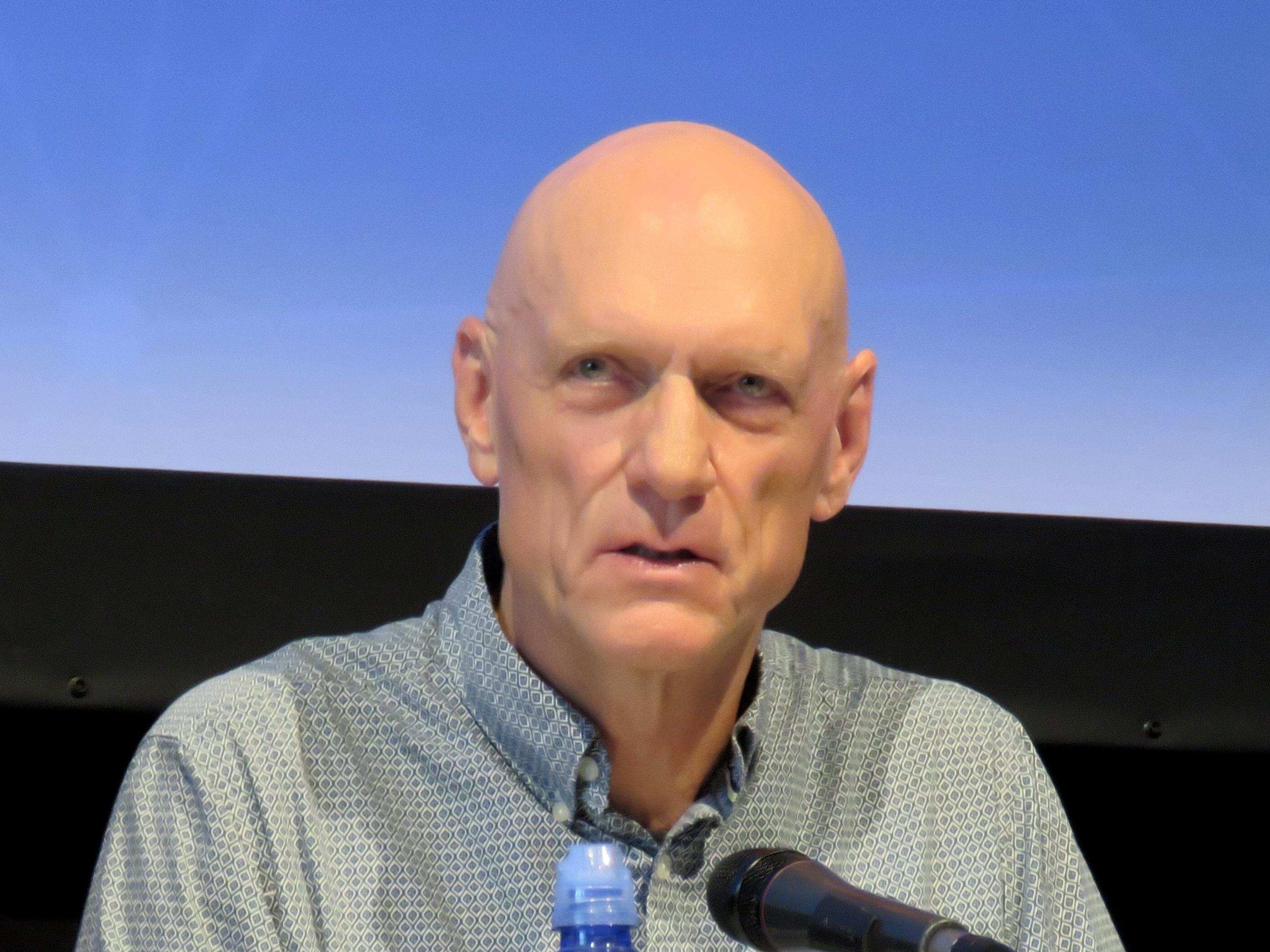
Peter Garrett campaigning for the 2004 Australian federal election

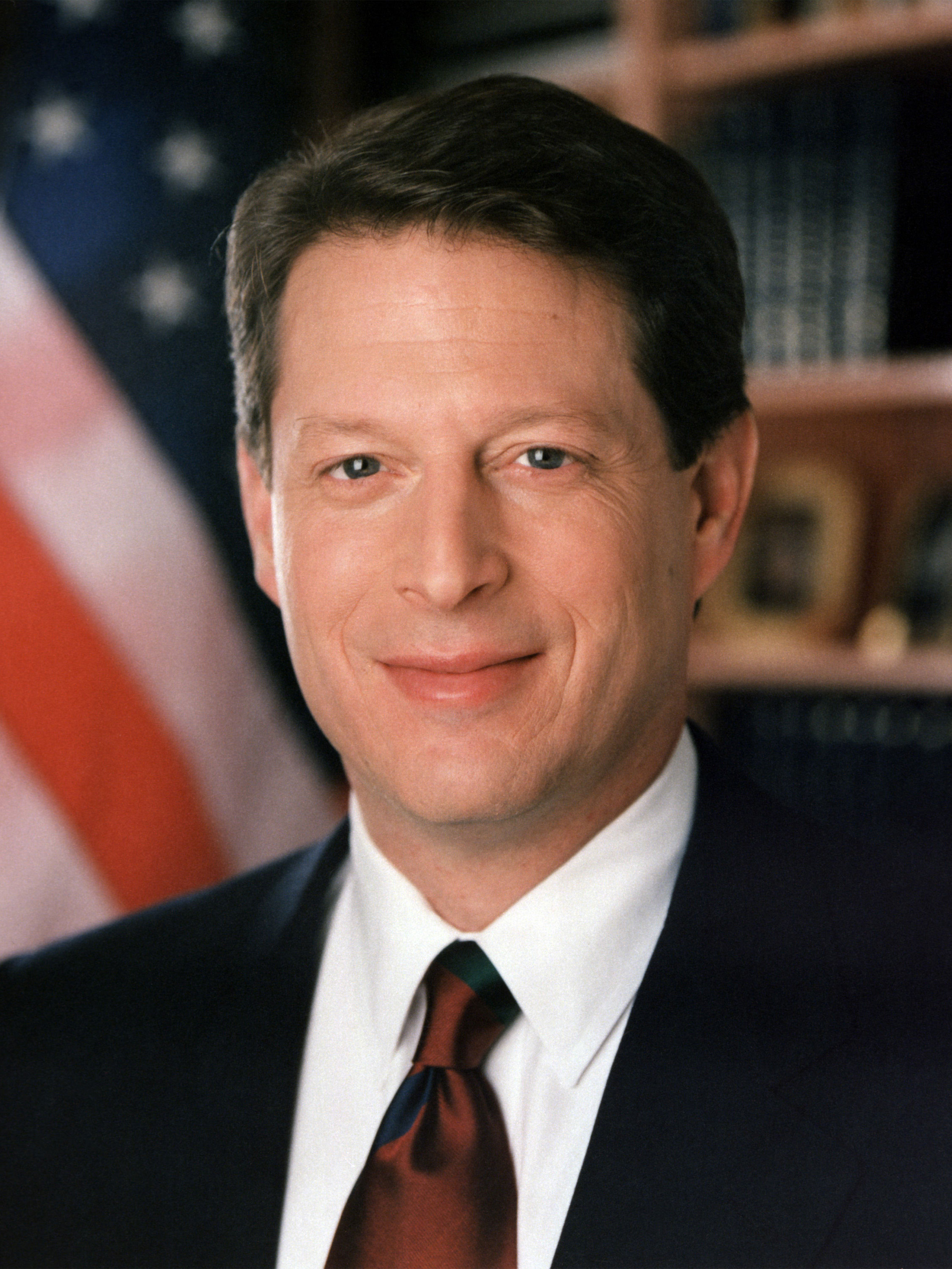
Al Gore, 2007 (former Vice President of the United States)

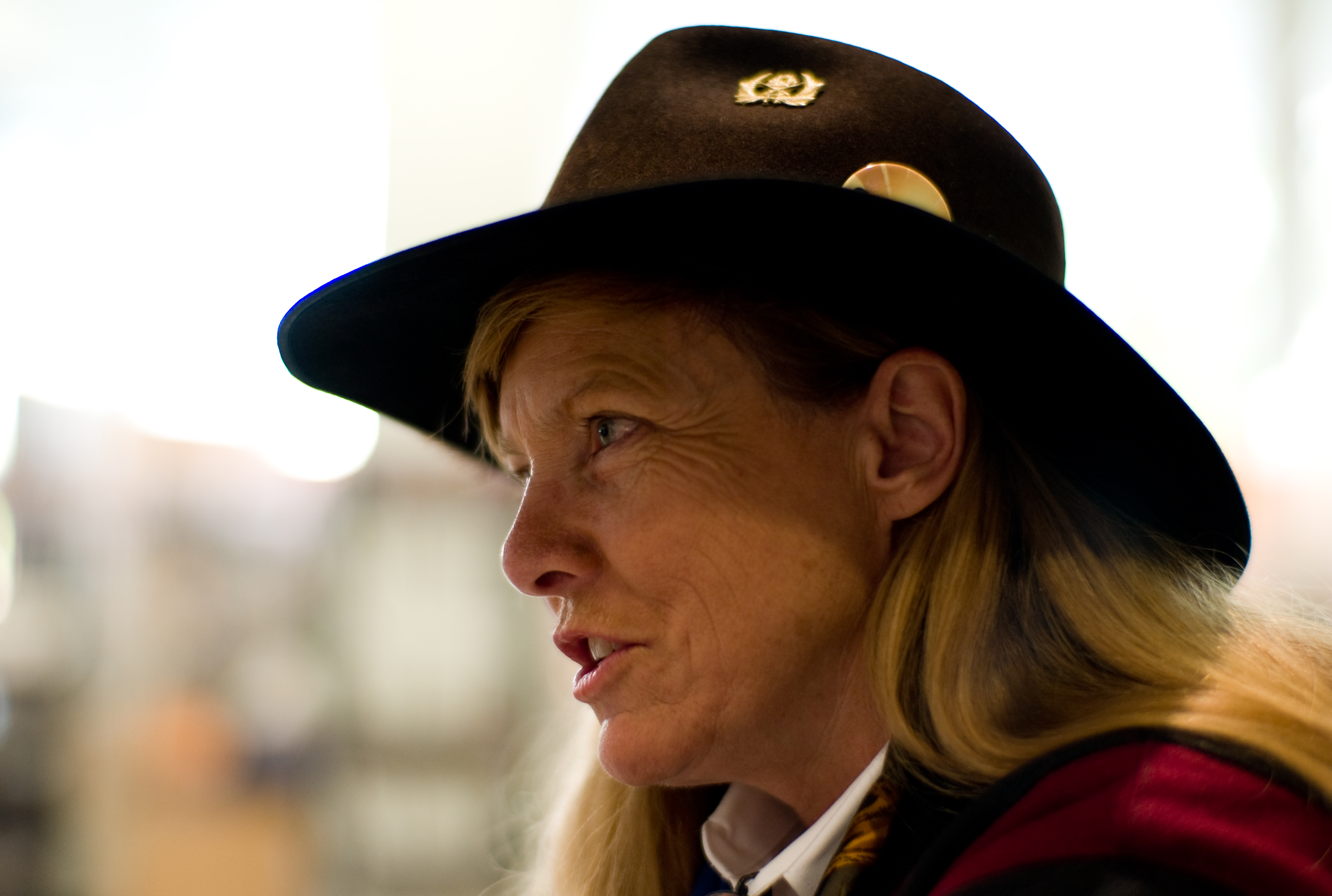
Hunter Lovins, 2007

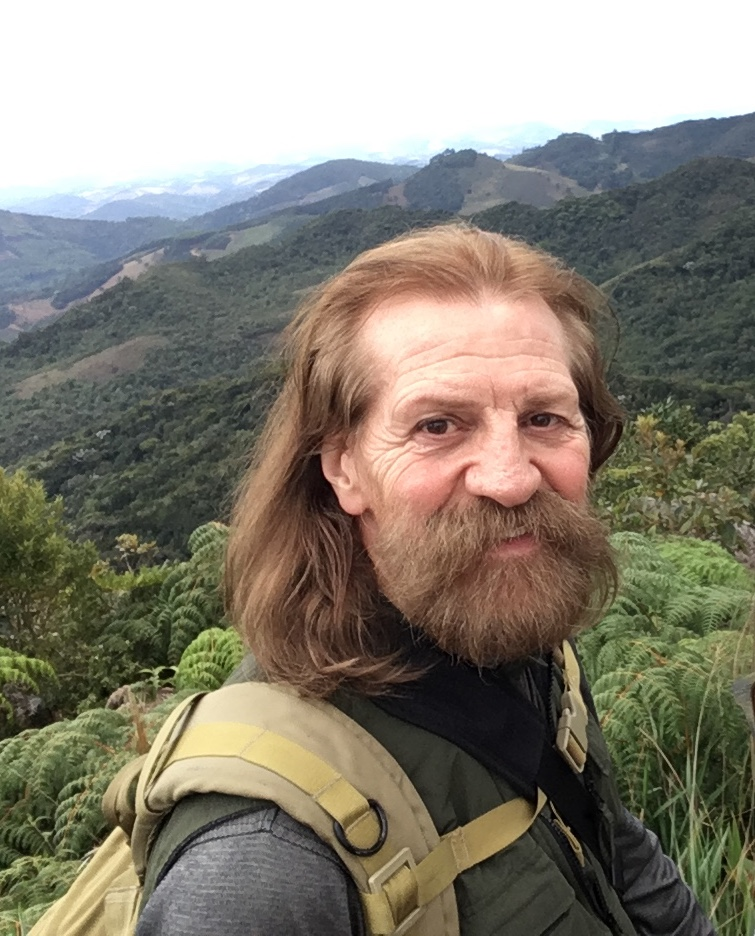
Sergio Rossetti Morosini, 2017

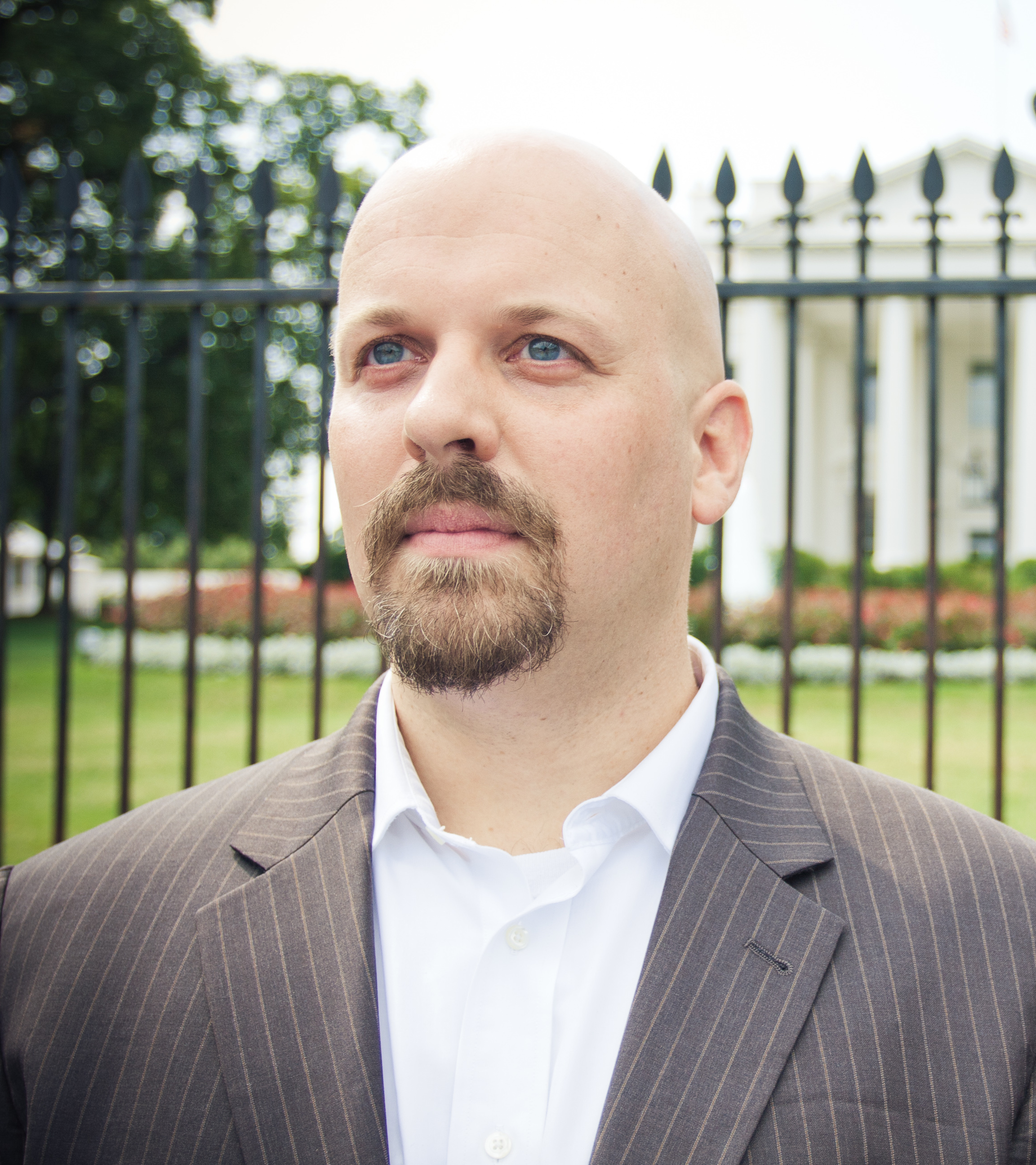
Phil Radford, 2011, (Greenpeace Executive Director)

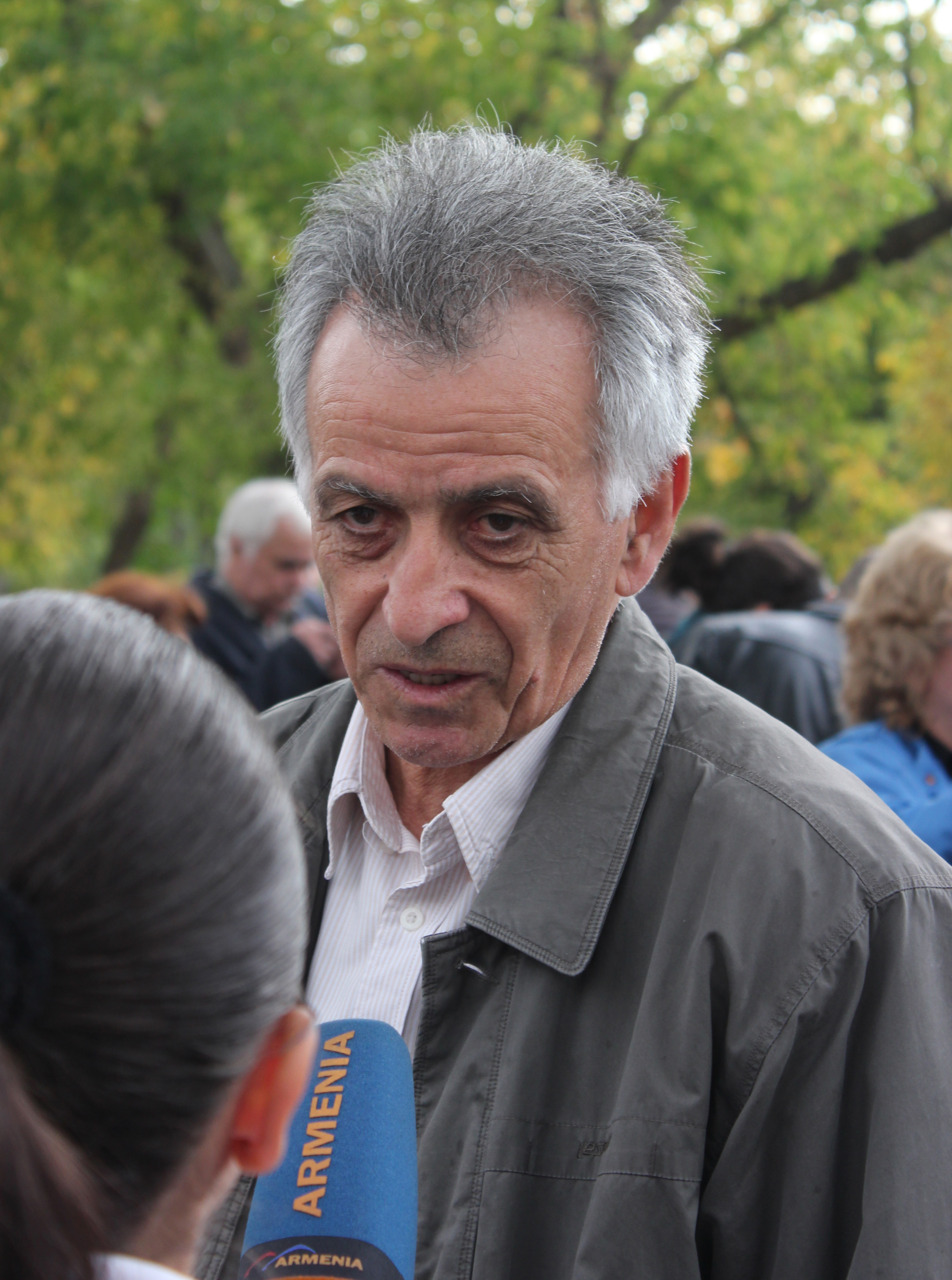
Hakob Sanasaryan campaignning against illegal construction of a new ore-processing facility in Sotk, 2011

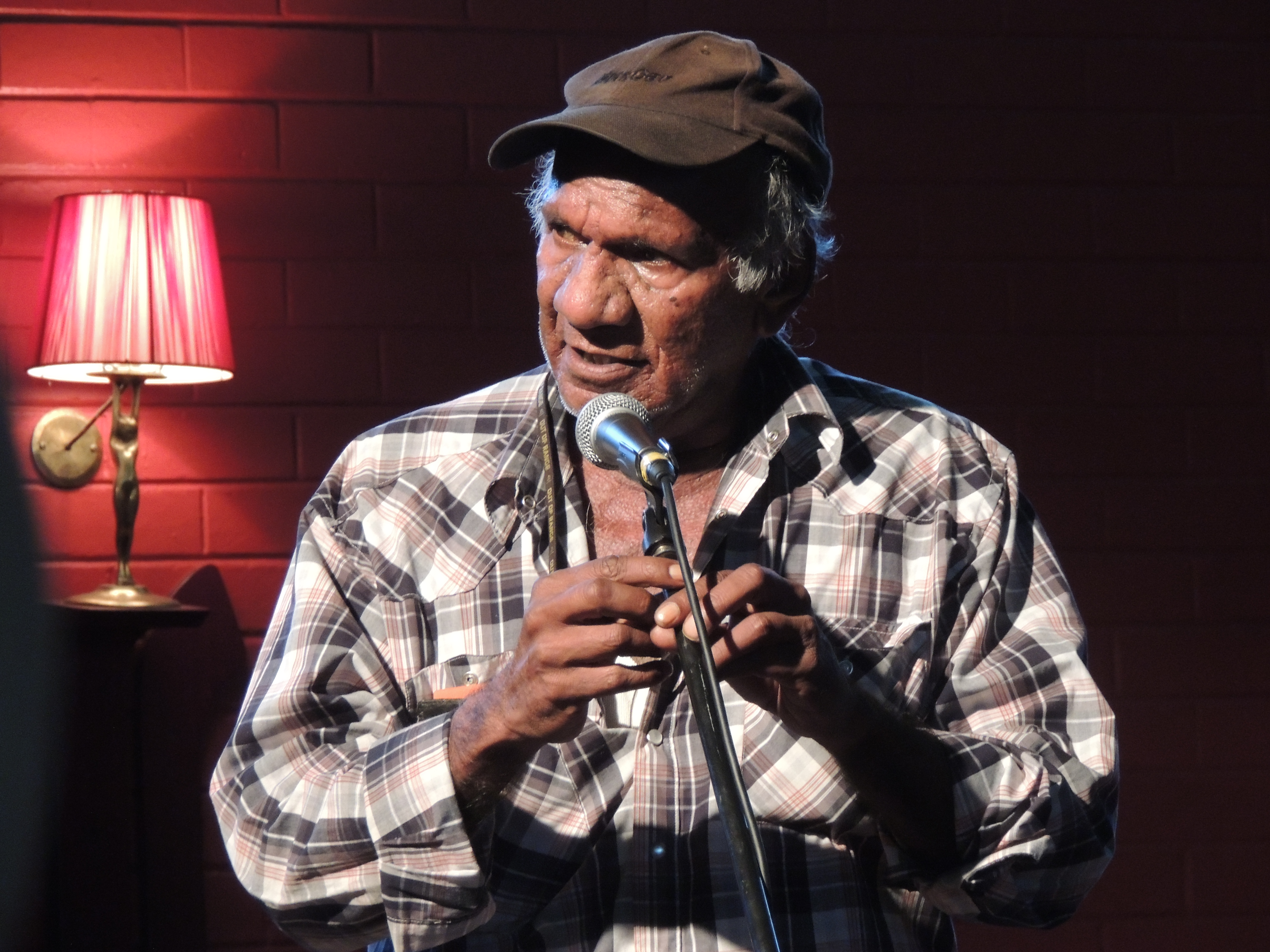
Kevin Buzzacott (Aboriginal activist) in Adelaide 2014

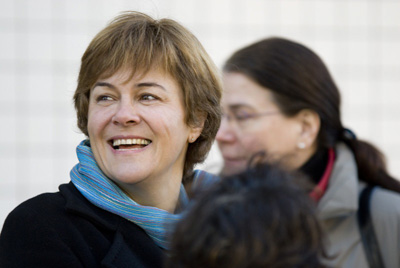
Dominique Voynet

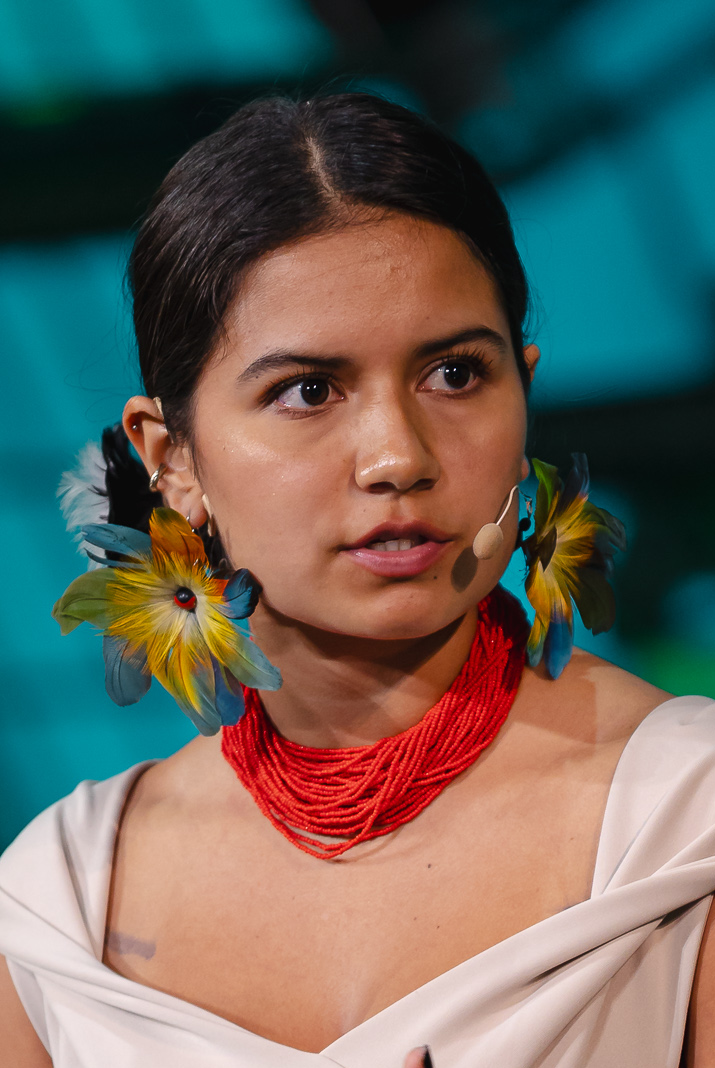
Helena Gualinga is a campaigner for the rights of Amazonian peoples and environmental protection.

- Mariano Abarca (activist, assassinated in 2009)
- Edward Abbey (author)
- Ansel Adams (photographer, writer, activist)
- Bayarjargal Agvaantseren (conservationist)
- Qazi Kholiquzzaman Ahmad (environmental activist and economist)
- David Attenborough (broadcaster, naturalist)
- John James Audubon (naturalist)
- Judi Bari (environmentalist)
- Sundarlal Bahuguna (environmentalist)
- Patriarch Bartholomew I (priest)
- Frances Beinecke (environmentalist and former president of the Natural Resources Defense Council)
- David Bellamy (botanist)
- Thomas Berry (priest, historian, philosopher)
- Wendell Berry (farmer, philosopher)
- Chandi Prasad Bhatt (environmentalist)
- Wendy Bowman (environmental activist)
- Stewart Brand (writer, founder of Whole Earth Catalog)
- David Brower (writer, activist)
- Molly Burhans (cartographer, activist)
- Murray Bookchin (anarchist, philosopher, social ecologist)
- Erin Brockovich (environmental lawyer and activist)
- David Brower (writer, activist)
- Bob Brown (activist and politician)
- Lester Brown (environmental analyst, author)
- Carol Browner (lawyer and activist)
- Molly Burhans (faith-based environmentalist)
- Kevin Buzzacott (Aboriginal activist)
- Berta Caceres (environmental and indigenous rights activist)
- Helen Caldicott (medical doctor)
- James Cameron (filmmaker and environmentalist)
- Joan Carling (human rights defender)
- Rachel Carson (biologist, writer)
- Chevy Chase (comedian)
- Majora Carter (urban revitalization strategist)
- Charles III (King of the United Kingdom)
- Ng Cho-nam (environmentalist)
- Barry Commoner (biologist, politician)
- Mike Cooley (engineer, trade unionist)
- Jacques-Yves Cousteau (explorer, ecologist)
- Herman Daly (ecological economist and steady-state theorist)
- Peter Dauvergne (political scientist)
- Faiza Darkhani (environmentalist, women's rights activist, and educator)
- Laurie David (activist and producer)
- Marina DeBris (environmental artist)
- John Denver (musician)
- Usha Desai (physician)
- Leonardo DiCaprio (actor)
- Michelle Dilhara (actress)
- René Dubos (microbiologist)
- Sylvia Earle (marine biologist)
- Paul R. Ehrlich (population biologist)
- Hans-Josef Fell (Green Party member in Germany)
- Jane Fonda (actor)
- Josh Fox (filmmaker)
- Mizuho Fukushima (politician, activist)
- Rolf Gardiner (rural revivalist)
- Peter Garrett (musician, politician)
- Jane Goodall (primatologist, anthropologist, and UN Messenger of Peace)
- Lois Gibbs (Founder of the Center for Health, Environment and Justice)
- Caroline Gleich (political and environmental activist)
- Al Gore (former Vice President of the United States)
- Helena Gualinga (campaigner for the rights of Amazonian peoples and environmental protection)
- Tom Hanks (actor)
- Daryl Hannah (activist)
- James Hansen (scientist)
- Garrett Hardin (ecologist, ecophilosopher)
- Denis Hayes (environmentalist and solar power advocate)
- Julia Butterfly Hill (activist)
- Nicolas Hulot (journalist and writer)
- Robert Hunter (journalist, co-founder and first president of Greenpeace)
- Huey D. Johnson (environmentalist)
- Lisa P. Jackson (former administrator of the United States Environmental Protection Agency)
- Jorian Jenks (English farmer)
- Kathy Jetn̄il-Kijiner (poet and climate activist)
- Okefenokee Joe (singer, songwriter, TV host, activist)
- Naomi Klein (writer, activist)
- Winona LaDuke
- Aldo Leopold (ecologist)
- A. Carl Leopold (plant physiologist)
- Charles Lindbergh (aviator)
- James Lovelock (scientist)
- Amory Lovins (energy policy analyst)
- Hunter Lovins
- Caroline Lucas (politician)
- Mark Lynas (journalist, activist)
- Wangari Maathai (activist, Nobel Laureate)
- Desmond Majekodunmi (environmentalist)
- Jarid Manos (CEO of the Great Plains Restoration Council)
- Peter Max (graphic designer)
- Michael McCarthy (naturalist, journalist, author)
- Xiuhtezcatl Martinez (activist)
- Bill McKibben (writer, activist)
- David McTaggart (activist)
- Chico Mendes (activist)
- Mahesh Chandra Mehta (lawyer)
- Nathan Méténier
- Joni Mitchell (musician)
- George Monbiot (journalist)
- Sergio Rossetti Morosini (naturalist, activist)
- Nyombi Morris (CNN Environmentalist of tomorrow)
- John Muir (naturalist)
- Luke Mullen (actor, filmmaker)
- Hilda Murrell (botanist)
- Ralph Nader (activist)
- Seyyed Hossein Nasr (writer, philosopher)
- Gaylord Nelson (politician)
- Aniebiet Inyang Ntui (environmental advocate)
- Yolanda Ortiz (chemist)
- Eugene Pandala (architect, natural and cultural heritage conservator)
- Alan Pears (environmental consultant and energy efficiency pioneer)
- Medha Patkar (activist)
- Gifford Pinchot (first chief of the USFS)
- River Phoenix (actor, musician, activist)
- Jonathon Porritt (politician)
- John Wesley Powell (second director of the USGS)
- Barbara Pyle (executive producer of Captain Planet and the Planeteers)
- Tahir Qureshi
- Phil Radford (Greenpeace Executive Director)
- Bonnie Raitt (musician)
- Clovis Razafimalala
- Theodore Roosevelt (former President of the United States)
- Hakob Sanasaryan (biochemist, activist)
- Habiba Sarobi (politician and activist)
- Ken Saro-Wiwa (writer, television producer, activist)
- E. F. Schumacher (author of Small Is Beautiful)
- Shimon Schwarzschild (writer, activist)
- Vandana Shiva (ecofeminist and activist)
- Marina Silva (politician and activist)
- Alicia Silverstone (author of The Kind Diet)
- Lauren Singer (activist and entrepreneur)
- Swami Sundaranand (photographer, mountaineer)
- Cass Sunstein (environmental lawyer)
- David Suzuki (scientist, broadcaster)
- Candice Swanepoel (model)
- Shōzō Tanaka (politician and activist)
- Rebecca Harrell Tickell (filmmaker, actress, activist)
- Tetsunari Iida (sustainable energy advocate)
- Saalumarada Thimmakka
- Henry David Thoreau (writer, philosopher)
- Greta Thunberg (environmental activist)
- Stewart Udall (former United States Secretary of the Interior)
- Jo Valentine (politician and activist)
- Dominique Voynet (politician)
- Franz Weber (animal welfare activist)
- Christopher O. Ward (water infrastructure expert)
- Harvey Wasserman (journalist, activist)
- Alice Waters (activist and restaurateur)
- Paul Watson (activist and lecturer)
- Henry Williamson (naturalist, writer)
- Gabriel Willow (environmental educator, naturalist)
- Howard Zahniser (author of the 1964 Wilderness Act)

=== Violence against activists ===
In the early 1990s, multiple environmental activists in the United States became targets of violent attacks. Every year, more than 100 environmental activists are murdered throughout the world. Most recent deaths are in Brazil, where activists combat logging in the Amazon rainforest.

116 environmental activists were assassinated in 2014, and 185 in 2015. This represents more than two environmentalists assassinated every week in 2014 and three every week in 2015. More than 200 environmental activists were assassinated worldwide between 2016 and early 2018. A 2020 incident saw several rangers murdered in the Congo Rainforest by poaching squads. Occurrences like this are relatively common, and account for a large number of deaths.

In 2022, Global Witness reported that, in the preceding decade, more than 1,700 land and environmental defenders were killed, about one every two days. Brazil, Colombia, Philippines, and Mexico were the deadliest countries. Violence and intimidation against environmental activists have also been reported in Central and Eastern Europe. In Romania, anti-logging activists have been killed, while in Belarus, the government arrested several environmental activists and dissolved their organizations. Belarus has also withdrawn from the Aarhus Convention.

== In popular culture ==
- Miss Earth is one of the Big Four international beauty pageants. (The other three are Miss Universe, Miss International, and Miss World.) Out of these four beauty pageants, Miss Earth is the only international beauty pageant that promotes environmental awareness. The Miss Earth winner is the spokesperson for the Miss Earth Foundation, the United Nations Environment Programme (UNEP) and other environmental organizations.
- Another area of environmentalism is to use art to raise awareness about misuse of the environment. One example is trashion, using trash to create clothes, jewelry, and other objects for the home. Marina DeBris is one trashion artist, who focuses on ocean and beach trash to design clothes and for fund raising, education.

== See also ==
- Climate movement
- Ecomodernism
- Environmental planning
- Environmental policy
- Environmental, social, and governance
- Greening
- Human impact on the environment
- List of climate scientists
- List of environmental organizations
- List of women climate scientists and activists
- Outline of environmentalism
- Political representation of nature
- Religion and environmentalism
