= Green seniors =

Elderly with active interest in environment

Green seniors refers to elderly or retired people who have an active interest in environmental issues.

The term is believed to have first been publicly used by the European Green Party in the 2005 Declaration of Brussels, and has been subsequently discussed by various Green Parties in Europe without wider uptake as a generic term.

A website called Green Seniors was launched in 2006 to attempt to give the term wider currency and provide a portal specifically for older people to access information and find environmental organisation and campaigns.
