= Jarid Manos =

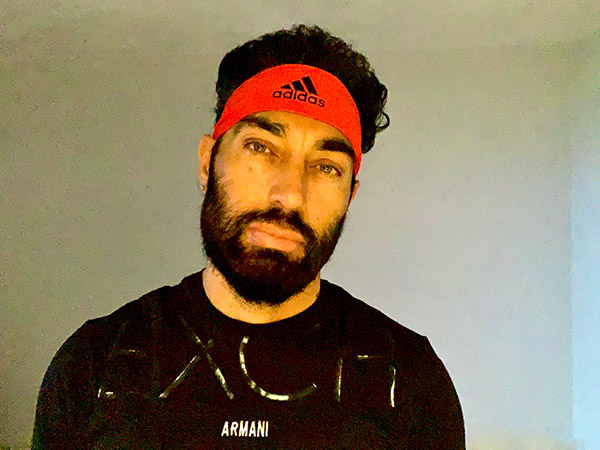
Jarid Nidal Manos

Jarid Manos is an author, speaker, environmental activist and founder and president of the Great Plains Restoration Council.

According to an article and interview with Manos in 2008, as a child in Ohio he "dreamed about buffalo, prairie dogs, and the Great Plains," (and then) "even while he dealt drugs on the New York City streets", and was eventually inspired by the idea of a Buffalo Commons.

In 1997, Manos, living in Pueblo, was convicted of hunter harassment while acquitted of criminal trespass, in a civil disobedience lawsuit. Manos and six other protestors had been arrested on July 5 "for disrupting a prairie dog shoot on private property".

in 1999, Manos founded the Great Plains Restoration Council and was a founding member of the Southern Plains Land Trust. The Southern Plains Land Trust, based in Boulder, Colorado, had paid $198,000 for a 1,280 acres (520 ha) property for receiving relocated prairie dogs. It was involved in controversy with Baca County, Colorado, landowners, which arose to consideration by the House Agriculture Committee of the U.S. House of Representatives.

His book Ghetto Plainsman was warmly endorsed by bestselling author E. Lynn Harris (1955-1999) before Harris died.

In his 2009 memoir Ghetto Plainsman, he describes himself as "an inner-city urban tattooed muscled ex-drug dealer homeboy thug hypersensitive vegetarian animist homosexual cyclist rural outback plainsman."

== Published works ==
- Ghetto Plainsman (2007, 2010)
