= Michael McCarthy (journalist) =

British environmentalist and writer

- Born: c. 1947; Birkenhead, Wirral, England
- Occupations: Journalist and author
- Known for: Writings relating to natural history
- Notable work: Say Goodbye to the Cuckoo

Michael McCarthy (born c. 1947 in Birkenhead, Wirral, England) is a British environmentalist, naturalist, newspaper journalist, newspaper columnist, and author.

He was born the son of John and Norah McCarthy. He studied Modern Languages at the University of Liverpool.

He worked as a journalist first on the Bolton Evening News and then on the Daily Mirror. After 17 years in local and tabloid journalism, he moved first to The Times, then to The Independent on Sunday, and then to The Independent; he worked 27 years for those broadsheet newspapers. He was Environment Editor of The Independent until 2013, and as of July 2015 is its Environment Columnist.

He was the driving force behind a campaign by The Independent to identify the reasons for the decline of the British urban House sparrow; but the £5,000 prize offered by that newspaper has as of July 2015 not been awarded.

== Awards ==
- 1991, 2003, 2006 – Environment Journalist of the Year, The British Environment and Media Awards
- 2001 – Specialist Writer of the Year, British Press Awards
- 2007 – Medal of the Royal Society for the Protection of Birds (RSPB), for outstanding services to conservation
- 2010 – Silver Medal of the Zoological Society of London
- 2011 – Dilys Breese Medal of the British Trust for Ornithology (BTO)

== Publications ==
- McCarthy, Michael (2 April 2009). Say Goodbye to the Cuckoo. London: John Murray. ISBN 978-1848540637.
- McCarthy, Michael (21 May 2015). The Moth Snowstorm: Nature and Joy. London: John Murray. ISBN 978-1444792775.
