= Usha Desai =

Indian environmentalist and medical doctor

- Education: M.R.C.P.
- Occupation: Doctor (retired)
- Known for: Environmental advocacy

Usha Desai is an Indian doctor of medicine and environmentalist.

== Early life and education ==
Desai holds a Membership of the Royal College of Physicians of the United Kingdom (M.R.C.P.). She worked as a doctor at the Mahatma Gandhi Memorial Hospital in Parel, Mumbai.

== Environmental advocacy ==
Desai raises awareness of the environment and particularly of trees by conducting immersive walks. She narrates stories related to the origin of trees as well as associated mythological tales in addition to scientific details. Each walk includes visiting and discussing dozens of preselected, carefully researched and often rare varieties of trees and plants. The walks also incorporate discussion of biodiversity.

Desai's mantra for saving trees is simple, as follows below.

"The tree walk will help you fall in love with trees. Thus, when you love a tree, you will not cut that tree, and that’s how we will be able to save our trees."

— Dr. Usha Desai

Desai is trained in botany, entomology and biodiversity from Bombay Natural History Society and Conservation Education Centre. She has conducted more than hundred tree walks in Maharashtra and Goa. Her work has influenced citizen movements for sustainable living.
