= Wendy Bowman (activist) =

Australian environmentalist (c. 1934–2023)

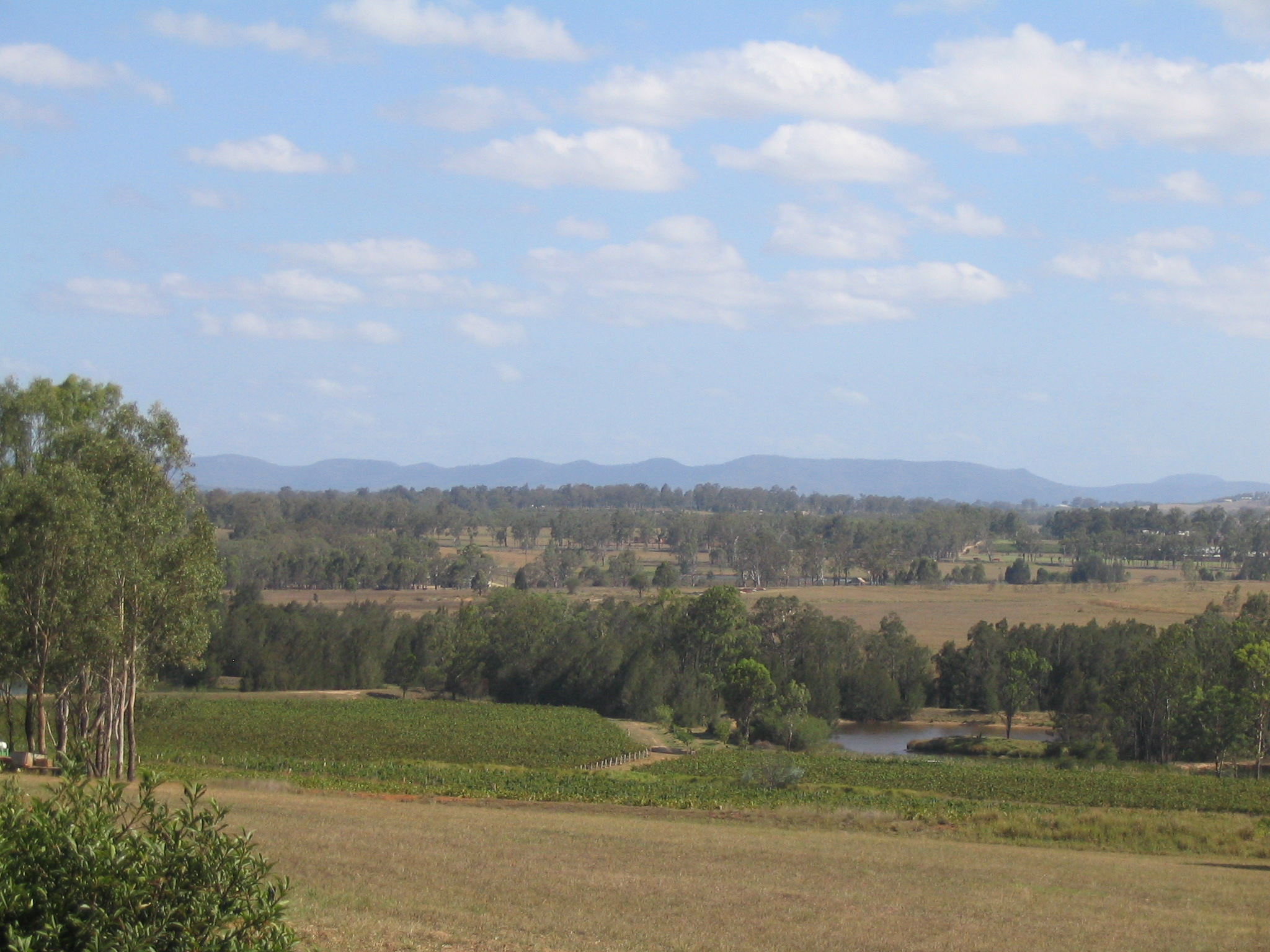
Hunter Valley landscape

Wendy Bowman (c. 1934 – 26 July 2023) was an Australian farmer and environmentalist in New South Wales who successfully campaigned to prevent Yancoal from developing coal mining in the Hunter Valley. In recognition of her efforts, she was awarded the Goldman Environmental Prize in 2017.

== Biography ==
Born in the 1930s in Sydney, Wendy Bowman belonged to a family which, on her father's side, arrived in Australia in 1798, and on her mother's side settled in the Hunter Valley in the 19th century. After graduating with a degree in art, she married Hunter Valley farmer Mick Bowman. When he died in 1984, she took over the farm. She had to relocate in 1988 as a result of open mining operations.

In 1988, her crops failed when mining caused heavy metals to pollute the water which irrigated her field. As a result of coal dust in the grass, her cattle refused to eat. From 1990, first through MineWatch and later through the Hunter Environment Lobby, she assisted local farmers to take political action in New South Wales. After moving her farm once, in 2005 she was given six weeks to relocate in order to make way for another mine. She settled in Rosedale in Camberwell.

Bowman's Rosedale farm was itself threatened in 2010 when Yancoal planned an extension of the Ashton South East Open Cut mine to one of the main tributaries to the Hunter River. The majority of farmers in the area had sold their property by early 2015. Bowman, whose land covered more than half the coal in the proposed mine, refused to sell as she sought to protect the area from devastation. In December 2014, the Land & Environment Court ruled that Yancoal could only proceed with the mine if Bowman agreed to sell. Despite offers of millions of dollars, she continued to refuse, bringing Yancoal's efforts to a close.

In recognition of her efforts, in April 2017 she was awarded the Goldman Environmental Prize. She died on 26 July 2023, at the age of 89.
