= Clovis Razafimalala =

Madagascar environmental activist

- Occupations: Environmental activist, human right activist
- Years active: 2009-present
- Organizations: Lampogno MaMaBaie; National Environmental Advocacy Coalition
- Awards: German Africa Prize (2018)

Clovis Razafimalala is a human rights defender and environmental activist from Madagascar. He is best known for his advocacy against the illegal logging in Madagascar.

Razafimalala, described by Mongabay as possibly Madagascar's best known activist. He won the German Africa Prize in 2018.

== Biography ==
Razafimalala has campaigned against the use of rosewood in Madagascar since 2009. In April, following the 2009 Malagasy political crisis, with five friends he started the Maroantsetra-based radio program Radio 2000, at which they discussed the illegal ebony and rosewood logging. Within one month, someone burned his house down. In the mid 2010's he founded the Lampogno MaMaBaie organisation, focussed on protecting the Masoala and Makira national parks from illegal resource extraction. Razafimalala also serves as the regional coordinator of the National Environmental Advocacy Coalition.

In 2016, Clovis was accused of orchestrating a riot after a fellow timber advocate was arrested. Despite not being present during the violent protest, he was imprisoned for these crimes. After a wave of support and a surprise trial, Clovis was eventually released. In 2017, he was charged with arson, fined and sentenced to five years of imprisonment, although immediately released on parole.

== See also ==
- Illegal logging in Madagascar
