= Swami Sundaranand =

Indian environmentalist (1926–2020)

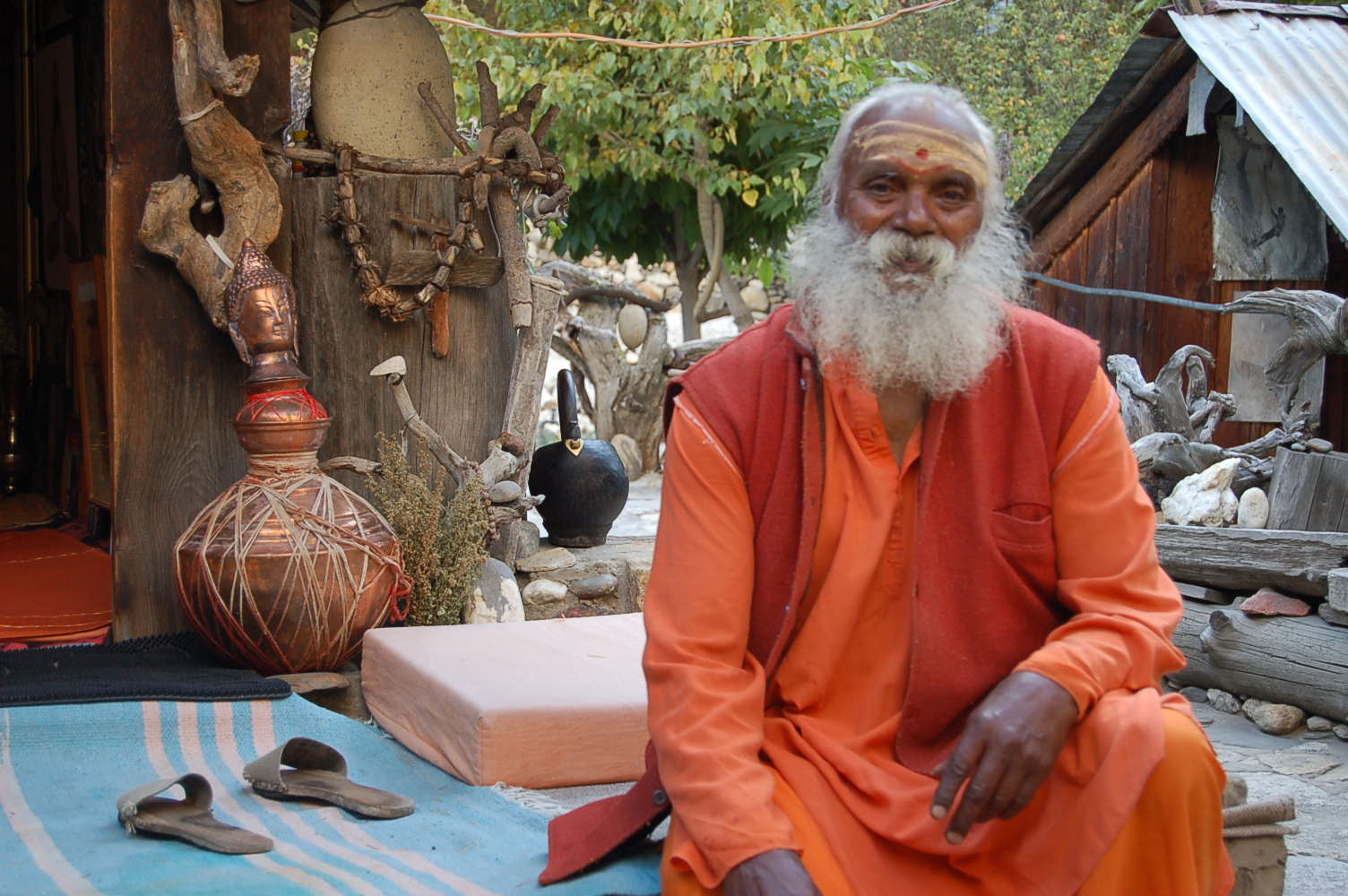
- Sundaranand at his Tapovan Kutir at Gangotri, 2005
- Born: April 1926; Nellore, India
- Died: 23 December 2020 (aged 94); Dehradun, India
- Occupations: Yogi, photographer, and mountaineer

Swami Sundaranand (April 1926 – 23 December 2020) was an Indian Yogi, photographer, author and mountaineer who lectured widely in India on threats to the Ganges River and the loss of Himalayan glaciers due to global warming.

== Biography ==
Swami Sundarananda was a student of the reclusive yoga master Swami Tapovan Maharaj (1889–1957), who wrote in the late 19th and early 20th centuries about yogic life in the Himalayas in the classic yoga book Wanderings in the Himalayas (Himagiri Vihar). Sundaranand lived with Swami Tapovan in the then inaccessible area of Gangotri, at the source of the Ganges, which is considered one of India's most sacred places.

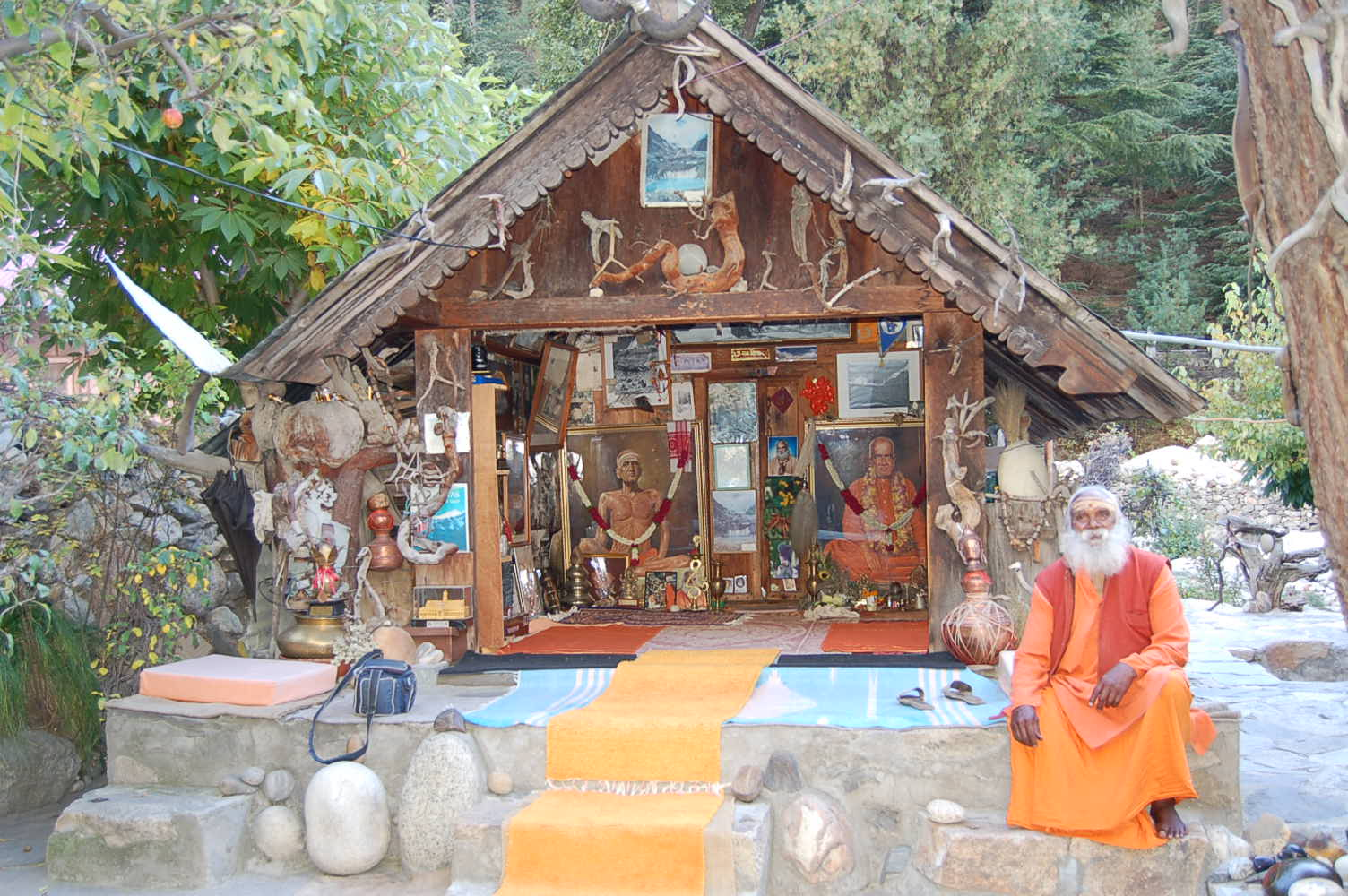
Swami Sundaranand at his hut at Gangotri

Since 1948, he has lived by the Ganges in Gangotri, at 10,400 feet, in a modest hut (kuti) which his master Swami Tapovan Maharaj later bequeathed to him on his death in 1957. There, Swami Sundaranand has lived in solitude and through the severest of winters without any comforts or conveniences. He has witnessed up close the gradual shrinking of the Gangotri Glacier from which the Ganges springs forth, and has chronicled his devotion to the natural beauty of the Indian Himalayas as an accomplished photographer. A museum devoted to environmental protection and spiritual guidance, containing Swami Sundaranand's Himalayan photography, is now in the planning stages. It will be located in Gangotri on the property of Sundaranand and his master.

As an ascetic, he took the brahmacharya sadhu vow in 1948 and daily devotes his life to rigorous meditation and other spiritual practices. He continues to be a principal advocate for the ecological preservation of the Himalayas, the Ganges and its source at Gangotri.

He has taken more than 100,000 photos, over a 50-year period, of the shrinking Gangotri glacier in the Indian Himalayas. He travelled through India raising awareness of the Gangotri's rapid decline.

Nicknamed "the Sadhu Who Clicks" because of his photography, he was also a noted mountain climber, having scaled over 25 Himalayan peaks, and climbing twice with Sir Edmund Hillary and Tenzing Norgay. Sir Edmund Hillary paid his respects to Swami Sundaranand in the 1980s at his Gangotri hut. Of the Gangotri glacier, Swami Sundaranand says:

In 1949, when I first saw the glacier, I felt as if all my sins were washed away and I had truly attained rebirth. But now, it is impossible to experience that Ganga of the past.

Swami Sundaranand is the author of the book Himalaya: Through the Lens of a Sadhu with over 425 photographs spanning 60 years of his work. The book also contains a letter of endorsement from the former Indian Prime Minister Atal Bihari Vajpayee. He sought to capture the Eternal in Nature and to document the region as it once was with a special emphasis on planting the seeds of hope and inspiration to solve the environmental concerns of the area. A lookout point and plaque have been built downriver from Gangotri and dedicated to the Swami's work and efforts.

Swami Sundaranand is the subject of a feature documentary shot at his home in Gangotri titled Personal Time with Swamiji. The film was produced by The Center for Healing Arts and directed by Victor Demko.

== Views on global warming ==
Over the past six decades, Swami Sundaranand has used his combined interests to raise awareness about the Ganga. "When I first came to this region, it was one of the most beautiful parts of the Himalayas," he says. "It is difficult to imagine the purity of the Ganga and the abundance of Himalayan vegetation and fauna that was prevalent then. We don't know what we have cruelly destroyed."

Swami Sundaranand has lived in Gangotri since 1948, when he became a renunciate, and arrived there from Andhra Pradesh. In his words: "A lot has changed since then. Although the air is cold here, the sun is harsh. It's becoming hotter every year. People say it is global warming. I say it is a global warning."

The pollution of Ganga in the plains has been an oft-repeated refrain, but, according to Sundaranand, a graver threat is its pollution at the source. He attributed this to the unchecked construction of hotels and ashrams in Gangotri and the dumping of waste from these locations, such as faecal matter and garbage, into the Ganga. According to him, "there are no environment lovers left here, only money lovers". Every year, while the temple town closes during the harsh winter months, unchecked construction and felling of trees is at its peak. According to the sadhu, "many bhoj trees in Bhojbasa, en route Gaumukh have been cut down. Earlier, on my treks to the Gaumukh glacier, I could spot rare animals like the snow leopard and musk deer. They are rarely visible now".

The sadhu was also an avid mountaineer — it was during his treks to the glacier over the last 10–15 years that he saw the glacier retreat more rapidly than ever before. According to him, Gaumukh was barely 1 km away from Bhojbasa, but today, it is 4 km away and that every year, the glacier was retreating by at least 10 metres. He has expressed the view that the pollution of Ganga at its source and melting Himalayan glaciers were the real issues that environmentalists needed to urgently take up, rather than opposing the construction of dams.

== Personal life ==
Swami Sundaranand had a strong connection with the Himalayas that few others have. He has climbed dozens of its peaks, several of them over 21,000 feet above sea level, and has lectured at Tensing's Himalayan Institute (a famous mountaineering school). He was also a skilled naturalist who was familiar with thousands of Himalayan plants and he knew the lore and medicinal uses of these species.

He engaged in 3 hours of meditation during the day, and sometimes meditated at night into the early hours of the morning. The most important parts of his life were meditation, japa and pranayama. As a younger man he was an accomplished hatha yogi, mastering 300 postures, and he continued to practice it daily. He was very devoted to the ecosystem in which he has lived for forty years and believed that "God does not reside in temples or mosques - he is scattered everywhere in the courtyard of nature."

Sundaranand died on 23 December 2020 at a private hospital in Dehradun. He was aged 96. He had been diagnosed with COVID-19 and had recovered earlier in October.

== Bibliography ==
- Himalaya: Through the Lens of a Sadhu. Tapovan Kuti Prakashan. August 2001. ISBN 978-81-901326-0-2.

== Filmography ==
- Personal Time with Swami-ji (157 mins, film, 2008, The Center for Healing Arts)
