= Molly Burhans =

American cartographer, data scientist, and environmental activist

- Burhans in Rome in 2026
- Born: September 5, 1989 (age 37); New York City, New York
- Occupations: environmentalist; cartographer; data scientist; professor
- Works: Catholic Geohub
- Website: mollyburhans.com

Molly Burhans (born 1989) is an American cartographer, data scientist, and environmental activist. She is the founder of GoodLands, an initiative focused on supporting the Catholic Church’s use of its global landholdings for stewardship, conservation planning, social justice and humanitarian purposes.

Burhans was the Chief Cartographer for the first unified digital global map of the Catholic Church in history, which was premiered in the Vatican in 2016. She has further led the development of global Catholic analyses, such as the Church's carbon footprint and conservation potential. Her work combines cartography, ecological design, data infrastructure and Catholic Social Teaching. It has gained her recognition from the United Nations, The National Geographic Society, the Ashoka Foundation, the Sierra Club, and more.

== Career ==
In 2015, Burhans founded GoodLands, a nonprofit and consulting initiative focused on applying geographic information systems and ecological planning to Catholic institutions and landholdings. In 2016, she led the creation of the first unified digital global map of the Catholic Church’s governing jurisdictions. Developed in collaboration with Esri and Catholic Hierarchy, and presented at the Vatican, the project compiled geographic boundary data for episcopal conferences, ecclesiastical provinces, and dioceses worldwide. The initiative sought to improve institutional planning, resource management, and environmental analysis within the Church.

Burhans later expanded this work through the development of the Catholic GeoHub, a digital platform integrating hundreds of Catholic datasets and interactive maps related to demographics, ecology, education, healthcare, and land use. digitizing decades of data from the Holy See Statistics Office for some Catholic data and collaborating with the Holy See's data curated and maintained by David Cheny of Catholic-Hierarchy.Org for other Catholic datasets.

Additional projects developed through GoodLands include mapping Catholic-affiliated properties across the United States, Catholic radio infrastructure in Africa, global Catholic healthcare and welfare institutions, and geospatial analyses related to Catholic education accessibility, conservation planning, and ecological restoration.

Burhans serves as an adjunct associate professor of Urban Design at Columbia University’s Graduate School of Architecture, Planning and Preservation. She has also held visiting scholar roles at Canisius University and delivered lectures at institutions including Yale University, Harvard University, University of Oxford, University of Notre Dame, and the Pontifical Academy of Sciences.

Her teaching and public lectures frequently address GIS, environmental stewardship, Catholic land governance, spatial ethics, and ecological systems thinking.

== Early life and education ==
Burhans was born in Manhattan, New York to Debra, a professor of computer science, and William, a researcher in molecular oncology, who died in 2019. Although she attended church as an adolescent, she became a practicing Catholic only while pursuing an undergraduate degree. While visiting a Benedictine monastery in Pennsylvania during a weeklong service trip, she observed that the monastery lacked comprehensive land management plans, and began researching the ways that improved land management of worldwide Catholic landholdings could aid environmentalism.

Burhans earned a Master of Science in Ecological Design from the Conway School of Landscape Design in Massachusetts, where she was a Sustainable Communities Initiative Fellow. Before that she studied philosophy at Canisius University in Buffalo, New York, where she also minored in dance. During her undergraduate years, she became involved in social justice initiatives, urban agriculture, and interdisciplinary approaches to sustainability. She attended high school at City Honors School in Buffalo, New York.

Before her work in cartography and environmental systems, Burhans worked as a laboratory technician at Roswell Park Comprehensive Cancer Center, contributing to research on DNA replication, oxidative stress, and genomic instability. She also developed a background in scientific illustration and media production through training in biological illustration at Cornell University’s Shoals Marine Laboratory.

Burhans is currently a student in Social Sciences at the Pontifical University of Saint Thomas Aquinas (Angelicum) in Rome, Italy. She also serves as the inaugural Ignazio Danti, O.P. Fellow in Geography through The Catholic University of America’s Leonum Institute for AI and Emerging Technologies.

== Honors and awards ==
- Doctor Honoris Causa, Saint Mary’s College, 2023
- St. Oscar Romero Award, Mercyhurst University, 2023
- Mary Magdalene Award, Church of St. Ignatius Loyola, New York City, 2022
- Encyclopædia Britannica, 20 Under 40 Young Shapers of the Future in category of academia and ideas, 2022
- Aleteia, 10 Catholics who Restored Our Faith in Humanity in 2021
- Sierra Club, EarthCare Award, 2021
- National Geographic Emerging Explorer, 2021
- National Geographic Explorer, 2021
- Henry Arnhold Conservation Fellow, Mulago Foundation, 2021
- United Nations Young Champion of the Earth (North America), 2019
- Grist Fixer, Grist Media, 2019
- Ashoka Fellowship, 2018
