= Nathan Méténier =

French climate activist

Nathan Méténier is a French climate and environmental activist. He was one of the youngest members of the United Nations' first Youth Advisory Group on Climate Change from 2020 to 2022, and is the founder of Generation Climate Europe, a coalition of youth-led networks at the European level that advocates for stronger action from the EU on climate and environmental issues.

== Early life and education ==
Nathan Méténier grew up in Grenoble in the French Alps, where he could observe the effects of climate change first hand.

He graduated from Grenoble Institute of Political Studies. As of 2020 he was studying at the London School of Economics.

== Career and activism ==
Méténier has worked for and has been involved in many organisations and movements, notably as regional director of Youth4Nature and spokesperson of Youth and Environment Europe. He has focused on strengthening the voice of youth movements in Brussels. He founded Generation Climate Europe in 2019, which created a coalition of the main European youth movements active on environmental issues. The organisation advocates for stronger action from the EU on climate and environmental issues.

From 2019 to 2021, Méténier was on the Board of Youth and Environment Europe. In 2021 he was ambassador for Youth4Nature.

In July 2020, Méténier was named by United Nations Secretary-General António Guterres to the first iteration of the Youth Advisory Group on Climate Change, a group of seven young climate leaders to advise him on action for the climate crisis for a period of two years. Méténier was one of the youngest in the group, which ranged from 18 to 28 years old. He was the only one representing France and western Europe.
