= Nyombi Morris =

Environmental activist (1998-)

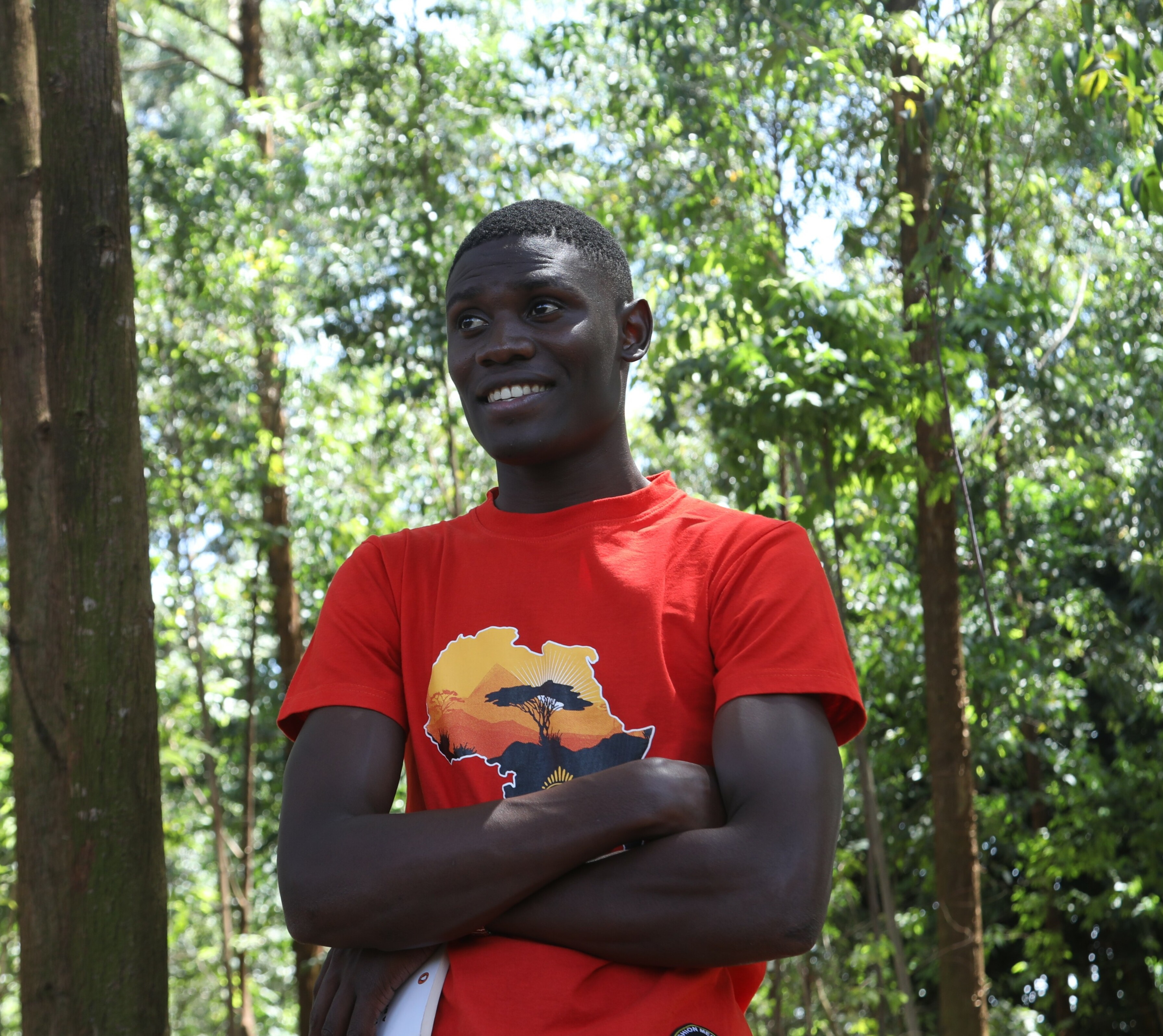
- Born: March 28, 1998 (age 28); Kampala, Uganda
- Education: Muteesa 1 Royal University
- Occupation: Environmental activist
- Years active: 2019–present
- Movement: School Strike for Climate
- Awards: Full list

Nyombi Morris (born March 28, 1998) is a Ugandan environmental activist who is known for promoting and advocating for climate justice and gender equality. Morris's activism began when he asked world leaders and polluters to adopt climate change based on the devastating rains and floods in Uganda. Morris is CEO of a non-profit organization he founded known as Earth Volunteers, an ambassador for the UNOCHA, and CNN's "Environmentalist of Tomorrow."

== Early life and education ==
Morris studied for a diploma in Information technology and computer science at Muteesa I Royal University in Masaka, Uganda.

== Activism ==
=== Beginnings ===
In November 2014, while living in Luzira, rain and floods caused by deforestation of the Bugoma Forest, destroyed Morris's family's farm and forced them to find a new home in Kampala. This experience began his activism that caused him to ask world leaders and polluters to take climate change more seriously. A few years later, he was inspired by Vanessa Nakate, a Ugandan climate justice activist and learned about climate activism. Since then, he has joined her on school strikes.

In 2019, he became a social media manager and climate justice advocate for a non-profit called Rise Up Movement, that provides support for youth around the world to join forces and slow climate change.

In September 2019, Morris's climate activism received international attention when he was featured striking for climate change in various news outlets, including BBC, CBC, CNN, The Verge, Global Citizens, Reuters, and Earth.org. After the protest, five Twitter accounts were suspended at the request of the Ugandan government, including his.

=== Strike for Climate ===
On March 25, 2021, Morris joined the School Strike for Climate global movement, started by Greta Thunberg, called "Fridays for Future". He and his brother were arrested on the streets of Kampala by the Uganda National Police when they were protesting for climate justice. When other people started gathering, they were released, but their placards and phones were taken. In June 2021, CNN voted Morris "Environmentalist of Tomorrow," for his environmental causes. On October 31, 2021, Morris spoke to CBC chief political correspondent, Rosemary Barton, about the impact of climate change on his country. His message for world leaders at United Nations Climate Change Conference (COP26) was "To put an end to fossil fuels and make polluters pay." The conference meets every year and is the global decision-making body set up to implement the United Nations Framework Convention on Climate Change. In November 2021, Morris organized tree planning events and began foresting Uganda with seeds and native plants from community gardens. In a project called "Taking Climate Change to Schools," he worked with thirty schools to teach children to speak out on climate change and to understand what they can do about helping the environment. The project included a climate syllabus in schools, planting over 47,500 trees, and recycling plastic waste.

Morris won the Population Matters Choice Ambassador Award in January 2022, for helping to raise awareness of population issues. In July of that year, he received the Earth Champion Award for inspiring the younger generation to take action on climate change. On the "Call to Earth Day" in February 2022, Morris and a group of 30 volunteers planted over 500 trees in Jinja, Uganda. That same year, Morris earned the honor of ambassador from media organization Doha Debates at the "SolvingIt26" project for making a positive difference for African nations. In February 2023, he was nominated as a Social Justice Hero by Global Citizens, because "he displays the bravery needed to fight for an end climate change."

On January 16, 2024, Morris became the ambassador for the upcoming Green Vision Summit & Expo (GVSE). He was to represent the GSE and GVSE brands in Uganda and neighboring African countries.

=== Exile ===
According to The Guardian, Morris was forced to flee Uganda in late 2024 following "fierce backlash" to the support he had begun to voice for LGBTQ rights in Uganda after his sister was outed as lesbian and expelled from her school in 2023.
