= Alan Pears =

Alan Pears, AM, is an environmental consultant.

Pears was a member of the Energy Information Centre as part of the Victoria State Government.

During 2009, he received the Order of Australia.

== See also ==
- Energy law
- Energy policy in Australia
- Solar power in Australia
- Renewable energy in Australia
- Wind power in Australia
