= Shimon Schwarzschild =

German-born American environmental activist (1925–2021)

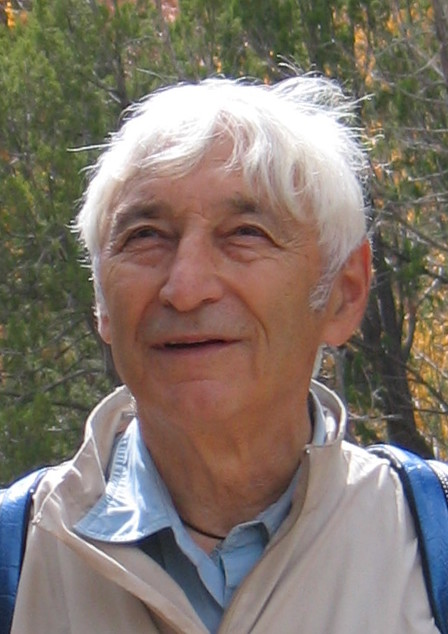
- Born: 19 December 1925; Wertheim, Germany
- Died: 10 November 2021 (aged 95); New York, U.S.
- Other name: Bert Schwarzschild
- Website: http://www.shimonschwarzschild.com

Shimon Schwarzschild (19 December 1925 – 10 November 2021) was a German-born American environmental activist. His work contributed to the establishment of a nature preserve in Assisi, Italy. Schwarzschild founded the Assisi Bird Campaign and helped organize the Assisi Nature Council. He was also active on many other environmental and neighborhood issues.

Schwarzschild's activism received news coverage regionally, nationally, and internationally. He was listed in the World Who's Who and Does What in Environment & Conservation.

== Publications and works ==
Schwarzschild's publications include a 1983 article in Audubon Magazine that first called international attention to the destruction of the birds of Assisi by hunting.

In 2020, Schwarzschild was finishing a film project called "Transcending Terror" about his relationship with the German town in which he grew up, Wertheim. He described the film as a documentary on "Loss, Opportunity and Redemption". The film is being made with the assistance of Schwarzschild's grand-nephew Benjamin Schwarzschild, who stated that the film will include many scenes of Laudenbach, where Shimon's mother was born. As of April 2020, the film was expected to be completed in May 2020, and to premier in the county museum in autumn 2020.

== Personal life ==
Schwarzschild was born on 19 December 1925, in Wertheim, Germany. Schwarzschild's mother, Rosalia Birk, daughter of Moses and Ida Birk, was born in Laudenbach, Germany. He obtained a bachelor's degree in Electrical Engineering at the New Jersey Institute of Technology (1950).

In 2004 in New York City, Schwarzschild married Naomi Schechter.

In 2010, and at several other times in later years, Schwarzschild visited his birthplace, Wertheim.

In 2019, at the age of 93, Schwarzschild and his wife visited his mother's birthplace Laudenbach, where he was hosted by Anja Baier, the third mayor of Karlstadt, a town that now encompasses Laudenbach, and two members of a synagogue that Schwarzschild attended as a child.

He died in New York on 10 November 2021, at the age of 95.
