= List of Armenian scientists =

This is a list of Armenian scientists.

== A ==
- Alexander Abian (1923–1999) — mathematician
- Armen Abaghian (1933–2005) — specialist on nuclear power, Doctor of Technical Sciences
- Manuk Abeghyan (1865–1944) — philologist, literary scholar, folklorist, lexicographer
- Haruthiun Abeljanz (1849–1921) — Swiss chemist
- Evgeny Abramyan (1930–2014) — founder of several research directions in the Soviet and Russian nuclear technology
- Daron Acemoglu (born 1967) — economist, he received the John Bates Clark Medal in 2005, and the Nobel Prize in Economics in 2024
- Hrachia Acharian (1876–1953) — linguist, lexicographer, etymologist, and philologist
- Sarkis Acopian (1926–2007) — inventor, designed and manufactured the first solar radio
- Hovannes Adamian (1879–1932) — engineer, inventor of color television
- Vadym Adamyan (born 1938) — theoretical physicist
- Leyla Adamyan (born 1949) — obstetrician-gynecologist, doctor of medical sciences
- Sergei Adian (1931–2020) — mathematician, head of the department of mathematical logic at the Steklov Institute of Mathematics
- George Adomian (1922–1996) — mathematician, developed the Adomian decomposition method (ADM) for solving nonlinear differential equations, both ordinary and partial, which was considered a mathematical revolution
- Nicholas Adontz (1871–1942) — historian, specialising in Byzantine and Armenian studies
- Noubar Afeyan (b. 1962) — biochemical engineer, co-founder of the biotechnology company Moderna
- Agathangelos (5th century) — pseudonym of the author of a life of the first apostle of Armenia, Gregory the Illuminator
- Tateos Agekian (1913–2006) — astrophysicist, one of the pioneers of stellar dynamics
- George Aghajanian (1932–2023) — medical researcher, pioneer in the area of neuropharmacology
- Suren Aghababyan (1922–1986) — Soviet Armenian literary critic
- Hagop S. Akiskal (1944–2021) — psychiatrist; pioneer in the study of outpatient mood disorders; today's leading conceptual thinker in the area of bipolar subtyping; rose to prominence with his integrative theory of depression
- Armen Alchian (1914-2013) —economist; pioneer of evolutionary theory of the firm, co-developer of property rights theory.
- Artem Alikhanian (1908–1978) — nuclear physicist, one of the founders and first director of the Yerevan Physics Institute (YerPhI)
- Sos Alikhanian (1906–1985) — geneticist, one of the founders of molecular genetics in the USSR, founder of the State Research Institute of Genetics (GosNIIgenetika)
- Abram Alikhanov (1904–1970) — nuclear physicist, one of the founders of nuclear physics in the USSR, founder of the Institute for Theoretical and Experimental Physics (ITEP)
- Roger Altounyan (1922–1987) — asthma researcher, pharmacologist who pioneered the use of cromolyn sodium inhalation therapy for asthma
- Amirdovlat of Amasia (1420–1496) — wrote several works on medicine and science, some aimed at professional audiences and some at ordinary people
- Sergey Ambartsumian (1922–2018) — mechanician and engineer, the author of refined theories of elastic and magnetoelectroelastic plates, shells
- Viktor Ambartsumian (1908–1996) — astrophysicist, one of the founders of theoretical astrophysics
- Włodzimierz Antoniewicz — rector of the University of Warsaw, and a member of the PAN
- Apkar Apkarian — pioneer in magnetic resonance spectroscopy research of the brain
- Suren Arakelov (born 1947) — mathematician
- Vardan Areveltsi (1198–1271) — medieval historian, geographer, philosopher and translator
- Tovma Artsruni (9th century) — historian who authored the History of the House of Artsrunik
- Emil Artin (1898–1962) — mathematician, one of the founders of modern algebra
- Yacoub Artin (1842–1919) — educator and scholar working in Egypt
- Michael Artin (born 1934) — mathematician, known for his contributions to algebraic geometry
- Andreas Artsruni (1847–1898) — pioneer in geochemistry
- Ana Aslan (1897–1988) — Romanian biologist and physician
- Gurgen Askaryan (1928–1997) — physicist, inventor of light self focusing
- Lev Atamanov (1905–1981) — animated films director, one of the founders of Soviet animation art
- Vandika Ervandovna Avetisyan (born 1928) — botanist and mycologist, graduate of Yerevan State University; fellow of the Armenian National Academy of Sciences. Major contributor to knowledge of the flora of her native Armenia.
- Suren Ayvazyan (1933–2009) — geologist

== B ==
- Boris Babayan (born 1933) — computer scientist, father of Soviet and Russian supercomputing, founder of Moscow Center of SPARC Technologies (MCST)
- Viken Babikian — cardiovascular researcher
- James P. Bagian (born 1952) — NASA astronaut
- Nicolae Bagdasar (1896–1971) — Romanian philosopher
- Oscar H. Banker (1895–1979) — inventor of automatic transmission for automobiles
- John Basmajian (1921–2008) — Canadian medical doctor and anatomist
- Arthur H. Bulbulian (1900–1996) — pioneer in the field of facial prosthetics

== C ==
- Levon Chailakhyan (1928–2009) — physiologist and cloning pioneer; produced world's first successfully cloned mammal, mouse "Masha", 10 years before the famous "Dolly"
- Mikhail Chailakhyan (1902–1991) — founder of hormonal theory of plant development
- Varoujan Chakarian (born 1962) - physicist, thin-film material scientist, semiconductor metrology and inspection expert, principal architect of numerous metrology, inspection and lithography equipment
- Mikayel Chamchian (1738–1823) — historian, grammarian and theologian
- Emmanuelle Charpentier (born 1968) — French professor and researcher, awarded the Nobel Prize in Chemistry
- Artur Chilingarov (1939–2024) — polar explorer, a corresponding member of the Russian Academy of Sciences
- Aram Chobanian (1929–2023) — served as president ad interim of Boston University
- Karapet Chobanyan (1927–1978) — mechanical engineer, discovered the phenomenon of Low-Stress in mechanics. Made the first discovery in Armenia and Transcaucasus which was registered in the Soviet Union's discovery registry under the number 102
- Giacomo Luigi Ciamician (1857–1922) — photochemist, "father of photochemistry and solar energy"
- Vasile Conta (1845–1882) — philosopher, poet, and politician

== D ==
- Harry Daghlian (1921–1945) – physicist who worked and died at the Manhattan Project Los Alamos laboratory
- Raymond Damadian (1936–2022) – physician, inventor of magnetic resonance imaging (MRI); produced the first MRI scan of the human body
- Ara Darzi, Baron Darzi of Denham (born 1960) – surgeon, academic, and politician
- Mkhitar Djrbashian (1918–1994) – mathematician, author of significant contributions to analysis
- Richard Donchian (1905–1993) – known as the father of trend following; a pioneer in the field of managed futures; considered to be the creator of the managed futures industry and is credited with developing a systematic approach to futures money management; developed the trend timing method of futures investing and introduced the mutual fund concept to the field of money management
- Vram Dovlatyan (1923–2005) – organic chemist, Academician of the Academy of Sciences of the Armenian SSR

== E ==
- Elishe (410 – 475) – historian from the time of late antiquity
- Hovhannes Erznkatsi – medieval scholar and philosopher
- Nikolay Enikolopov (1924–1993) – chemist, one of the founders of Russian polymer science

== G ==
- Gregory M. Garibian (1924–1991) – physicist, known for developing the Theory of Transition Radiation and showing the feasibility of functional transition radiation detectors (TRDs)
- Emil Gabrielian (1931–2010) – physician and academician
- Ivan Gevorkyan (1907–1989) – surgeon and scientist
- Grigor Gurzadyan (1922–2014) – outstanding astronomer; pioneer of space astronomy; pioneered the construction and use of small space telescopes, 20 years before the Hubble telescope
- Vahe Gurzadyan (born 1955) – mathematical physicist

== H ==
- Spiru Haret (1851–1912) — astronomer, mathematician and politician
- Joseph Hakobyan (born 1931) — expert on missiles development
- Ezras Harsatryan (1903–1981) — Soviet physiologist
- Alexander Harutyunov (1904–1975) — Soviet neurosurgeon
- Mkhitar Heratsi (12th century) — medieval priest and physician; wrote an encyclopedia on medicine; theorized that fever results from internal changes in the body, a revolutionary idea for medieval medicine; his work included psychotherapy, surgery, diet and herbs to cure diseases
- Paris Herouni (1933–2008) — radio physicist, astronomer; built world's most sophisticated radio telescope; has published over 340 scientific works

== I ==
- Bagrat Ioannisiani (1911–1985) – engineer, designer of the BTA-6, one of the largest telescopes in the world
- Andronik Iosifyan (1905–1993) – aerospace engineer, chief electrician of Soviet missiles and spacecraft, including the R-7 Semyorka and the Soyuz spacecraft
- Garik Israelian (born 1963) – astrophysicist; in 1999 provided the first evidence that stellar mass black holes are produced from supernova explosions; founder of Starmus Festivals; awarded gold medal by the Government of Canary Islands

== K ==
- Albert Kapikian (1930–2014) — virologist, developed the first licensed vaccine against rotavirus
- Mihran Kassabian (1870–1910) — physician, one of the early investigators into the medical uses of X-rays
- Zaruhi Kavaljian (1877–1969) — first female physician in Turkey
- Varaztad Kazanjian (1879–1974) — pioneer and one of the founders of modern plastic surgery
- Mishik Kazaryan (1948–2020) — physicist specialising in laser physics and optics
- Alexander Kemurdzhian (1921–2003) — aerospace engineer, designer of the first space exploration rovers for moon and mars
- Edward Keonjian (1909–1999) — engineer, an early leader in the field of low-power electronics, the father of microelectronics, designed the world's first solar-powered, pocket-sized radio transmitter
- Jack Kevorkian (1928–2011) — American pathologist and euthanasia proponent
- John W. Kebabian (1946–2012) — neuroscientist, discovered the existence of multiple dopamine receptor subtypes
- Leonid Khachiyan (1952–2005) — mathematician and computer scientist, best known for his ellipsoid algorithm for linear programming
- Zaven Khachaturian — neuroscientist and Alzheimer's disease researcher
- Edward Khantzian — early pioneer in the psychological understanding of addictions; co-originator of the self-medication hypothesis
- Movses Khorenatsi (410–490) — historian and author of book History of Armenia
- Tigran Khudaverdyan (born 1981) — computer scientist, deputy CEO of Yandex
- Semyon Kirlian (1898–1978) — pioneer of photography, discovered and developed Kirlian photography
- Ivan Knunyants (1906–1990) — chemist, significantly contributed to the advancement of Soviet chemistry, one of major developers of Soviet chemical weapons program
- Samvel Kocharyants (1909–1993) — nuclear scientist, developer of the first Soviet nuclear warheads for ballistic missiles
- Ervand Kogbetliantz (1888–1974) — French and American mathematician
- Khachatour Koshtoyants (1900–1961) — Soviet physiologist, Corresponding Member of the Academy of Sciences of the Soviet Union
- Leonid Kostandov (1915–1984) — engineer and politician
- Nerses Krikorian (1921–2019) — American chemist and intelligence officer at Los Alamos National Laboratory

== L ==
- Caro Lucas (1949–2010) – computer engineer, leader in computer science in Iran
- Ignacy Łukasiewicz (1822–1882) – pharmacist, one of the world's pioneers of the oil industry, built the world's first modern oil refinery

== M ==
- Mesrop Mashtots – invented the Armenian alphabet c. 405 AD, which was a fundamental step in strengthening Armenian national identity
- Soukias Manasserian – engineer and inventor
- Karen Manvelyan – biologist and environmentalist, director of the World Wildlife Fund in Armenia
- Hakob Meghapart (15th–16th century) – first Armenian printer, the originator of printing in Armenia
- Benjamin Markarian (1913–1985) – astrophysicist, known for Markarian's Chain
- Hal Markarian (1929–2012) – American aircraft designer; Northrop B-2 Spirit stealth bomber
- Natalya Melik Melikyan, (1906–1989) – doctor of Biological science
- Cyrus Melikian, (1920–2008) – coffee industry pioneer, inventor of coffee vending machines
- Sergey Mergelyan (1928–2008) – mathematician, author of major contributions in approximation theory, founder and head of the department of complex analysis at the Steklov Institute of Mathematics
- Ioan Mire Melik (1840–1889) – mathematician, educator and political figure
- Artem Mikoyan (1905–1970) – aerospace engineer, designer of MiG jet aircraft; his fighters established 55 world records
- Dmitry Mirimanoff (1861–1945) – mathematician, contributed to set theory
- Hayk Mirzayans (1920–1999) – entomologist; founder of the Hayk Mirzayans Insect Museum
- Rudolf Muradyan (born 1936) – theoretical physicist

== N ==
- John Najarian (1927–2020) – surgeon, pioneer in organ transplantation
- Aram Nalbandyan (1908–1987) – physicist, prominent in the field of physical chemistry, founder of the Institute of Chemical Physics in Yerevan, Armenia
- Robert Nalbandyan (1937–2002) – chemist; co-discoverer of photosynthetic protein plantacyanin; pioneer in the field of free radicals; leader in sickle cell research and testing methods

== O ==
- Yuri Oganessian (born 1933) – nuclear physicist in the Joint Institute for Nuclear Research (JINR), co-discoverer of the heaviest elements in the periodic table; element Oganesson
- Chubaryan Oganesovich (born 1931) – Soviet and Russian historian
- Yuri Osipyan (1931–2008) – physicist, known for his contributions to solid-state physics
- Abraham Constantin Mouradgea d'Ohsson (1779–1851) – Swedish historian and diplomat
- Joseph Orbeli (1887–1961) – orientalist, public figure and academician who specialized in medieval history of Transcaucasia and administered the Hermitage Museum in Leningrad
- Leon Orbeli (1882–1958) – physiologist active in the Russian SFSR

== P ==
- Hagop Panossian (born 1946) – aerospace engineer
- Charlie Papazian (born 1949) – nuclear engineer
- Ardem Patapoutian (born 1967) – molecular biologist and neuroscientist, won the Nobel Prize in Medicine in 2021
- Ashot Petrosian (1930–1998) – founding member of the Mergelyan Institute of Mathematical Machines
- Mikhail Pogosyan (born 1956) – aerospace engineer, general director of Sukhoi and United Aircraft Corporation (UAC)
- Astghik Pepoyan (born 1965) - molecular biologist and biotechnologist

== S ==
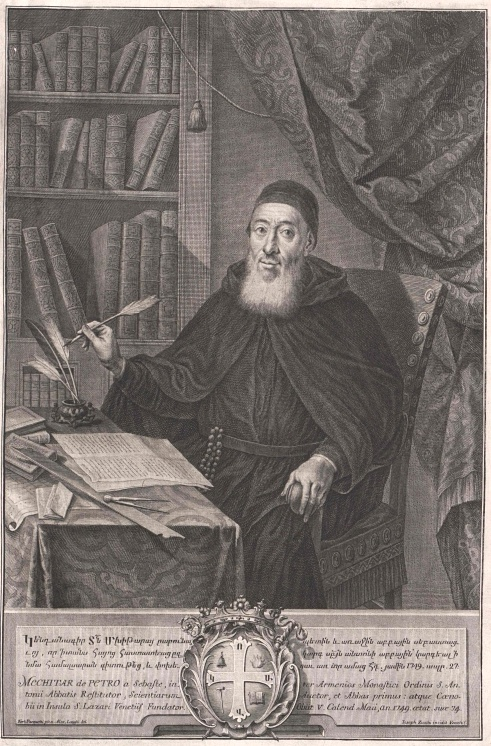
Mkhitar Sebastatsi

- Alex Sevanian — American pharmacologist
- Dork Sahagian — climate scientist, contributed to three of four assessment reports by the Intergovernmental Panel on Climate Change (IPCC) (the work of the IPCC, including the contributions of many scientists, was recognised by the joint award of the 2007 Nobel Peace Prize)
- Ashot Sarkisov (1924–2022) — Russian scientist who worked with nuclear submarine technology
- Artem Sarkisyan (1926–1916) — oceanographer, Doctor of Sciences, Academician of the Russian Academy of Sciences
- Vladimir Sargsyan (1935–2013) — mathematician, mechanician, founder of physical and geometrical small parameter method
- Shahamir Shahamirian (1723–1797) — writer, philosopher, and wealthy merchant, he published Vorogayt Parats
- Mkhitar Sebastatsi (1676–1749) — monk, scholar and theologian, founder of Mekhitarist Order
- Kirill Shchelkin (1911–1968) — physicist, in the former Soviet program of nuclear weapons who made theoretical and experimental contribution in combustion and gas dynamics
- Elizaveta Shahkhatuni (1911–2011) — aeronautical engineer and university teacher
- Gagik Shmavonyan (born 1963) — nanotechnology researcher and professor at the National Polytechnic University of Armenia
- Luther George Simjian (1905–1997) — inventor of 200 inventions, including the autofocus camera, ATMs, flight simulator, postage meter, teleprompter, medical ultrasound, golf simulator, meat tenderizer, and color X-ray machine
- Norair Sisakian (1907–1966) — biochemist, one of the founders of space biology
- Levon Khachikyan (1918–1982) — Soviet historian and philologist

== T ==
- Armen Takhtajian (1910–2009) — botanist, one of the most influential taxonomists of the latter twentieth century
- Guy Terjanian () — mathematician, has worked on algebraic number theory
- Alenush Terian (1921–2011) — first Iranian female astrophysicist
- Karen Ter-Martirosian (1922–2005) — theoretical physicist, known for his contributions to quantum mechanics and quantum field theory, founder and head of the department of Elementary Particle Physics of the MIPT
- Margarita Ervandovna Ter-Minassian — entomologist, mostly known for her work on the weevil subfamily Lixinae.
- Michel Ter-Pogossian (1925–1996) — medical physicist, father of positron emission tomography (PET)
- George Ter-Stepanian (1907–2006) — scientist in the field of soil mechanics and engineering geology
- Avie Tevanian (born 1961) — computer scientist and programmer, main developer of Apple Mac OS X
- Khachig Tölölyan (born 1944) — scholar of diaspora studies

== Z ==
- Vanik Zakaryan (1936–2023), mathematician
- Ruben Zaryan (1909–1994), Soviet academic
