= Hakob Sanasaryan =

Armenian environmentalist (1936–2024)

- Հակոբ Սանասարյան
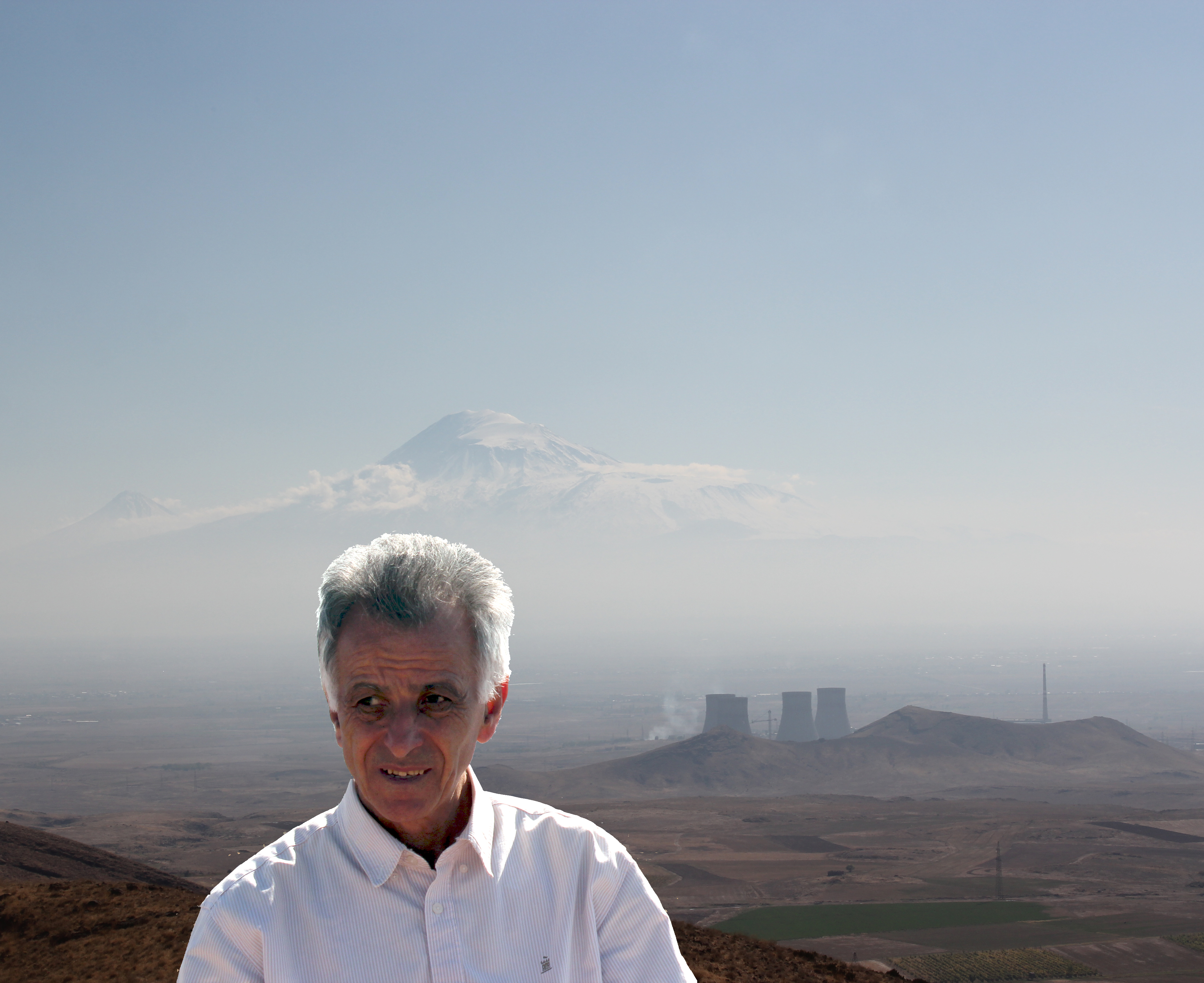
- Sanasaryan in 2011
- Born: 21 December 1936; Yeranos, Armenian SSR, USSR
- Died: 9 October 2024 (aged 87)
- Known for: Grassroots Environmentalism in Former Soviet Union; Founder of Environmental Movement in Armenia; President of the Greens Union of Armenia
- Office: Member of the Supreme Council (Armenia) (First Convocation, 1990-1995) and Deputy Chairman of the Parliamentarian Committee on Nature Protection and Natural Resources.
- Scientific career
- Education: Yerevan State University (M.Sc. 1964); Institute for Chemistry of Natural Compounds (Institute of Bioorganic Chemistry) of Academy of Sciences of the Soviet Union, Moscow (Ph.D. 1974)
- Fields: Biochemistry
- Workplaces: L. A. Mnjoyan Institute of Fine Organic Chemistry of the Armenian National Academy of Sciences, Yerevan (1964-1968); Institute for Chemistry of Natural Compounds (IBCh RAS) of Academy of Sciences of the Soviet Union, Moscow (1968-1974); Research Institute of Chemical Reagents and Highly Pure Chemical Substances, Yerevan (1974-1975); Armenian National Academy of Sciences, Yerevan (1975-1989)
- Thesis: Structure and Function of Vinomycin Analogs with Modified Lateral Chains and Altered Configuration of Asymmetric Centers (1974)
- Doctoral advisors: Academician Mikhail Mikhailovich Shemyakin and Academician Vadim Tikhonovich Ivanov

Hakob Sanasaryan (Armenian: Հակոբ Սանասարյան; 21 December 1936 – 9 October 2024) was an Armenian environmental activist, author and biochemist, the cofounder of one of the first environmentalist groups in the former Soviet Union: Goyapahpanutyun (Armenian: Գոյապահպանություն meaning survival) in 1985. This group was later in 1989 coined in the press as the Greens Union of Armenia (GUA). Hakob Sanasaryan was the president of the GUA.

== Biography ==
Having received his elementary and secondary education in the village Yeranos, he moved to Yerevan in 1954 for a one-year vocational education in building construction, after which he worked as a construction worker. His interest in natural sciences eventually led him to Yerevan State University, where he graduated in Chemistry in 1964. After graduation he worked about three years in the L. A. Mnjoyan Institute of Fine Organic Chemistry of the Academy of Sciences of Armenian SSR as a junior scientist. In 1968 he was admitted to the Institute of Organic Chemistry of the Academy of Sciences of the USSR in Moscow, where he finished his PhD in biochemistry in 1974. Returning to Armenia he worked for one year in the newly formed Research Institute of Chemical Reagents and Highly Pure Chemical Substances and then moved to the Academy of Sciences of Armenian SSR, where he remained to 1989. Sanasaryan has a lengthy resume as a biochemist, with numerous scientific publications.

Sanasaryan spent his childhood in a traditional village and in the natural environment of Yeranos, on the shore of Lake Sevan. As Sanasaryan recalls in his book: “Episodes of Armenian Ecologic Movement”, it was the thriving old tradition of nature worship in the village which shaped his love for nature: one had a deep respect for all living things. However, the situation was quite different for the Soviet State and in the big Soviet cities. For much of the history of the Soviet Union, the environment was an entity to conquer and exploit. One of the most cruel examples of this in Armenia, was the policy towards Lake Sevan, one of the largest, and highest alpine lakes in the world. Beginning in the 1930s, the government of the Soviet Union started diverting Lake Sevan's waters to the Hrazdan River for irrigation in the Ararat Valley and for hydroelectric power generation. This Soviet plan was based on the idea that by decreasing the water surface area of the lake, water loss from evaporation would be reduced and hence water could be used for agricultural and hydroelectric purposes. This catastrophic policy led, over a span of forty years, to a decrease of the volume of the lake by forty percent and lowering of its level by roughly nineteen meters. However, thanks to contributions from prominent Soviet scientists, there later came an end to this situation. George Ter-Stepanian, an internationally recognized scientist in the field of soil mechanics and engineering geology, Professor and Member of the National Academy of Sciences of Armenia and one of the pioneers of the environmental movement in the Soviet Union, showed in 1956 the technical and scientific erroneousness of the Lake Sevan project and urged for rising and the recovery of the original water level of the lake. The young Sanasaryan and the experienced Ter-Stepanian were bound to meet each other in the Academy of Sciences in the late 70s. This friendship led to a successful campaign in 1985-1987: they brought a halt to the construction of a highly secretive underground dumpsite for radioactive waste near the Armenian Nuclear Power Station in the Ararat Valley, 30 km away from Armenia's capital city of Yerevan. This was mainly also thanks to the cooperation of a number of scientists in the Academy of Sciences of USSR: Academicians Boris Sergeyevich Sokolov, Nikolay Enikolopov (Enikolopyan), Tigran Sergeevitsj Hatsjatoerov, Abel Aganbegyan, Samvel Samvelovich Grigoryan, Levon Chailakhyan, Alexander Yanshin, Nikita Moiseyev, Valery Legasov, Nikolai Pavlovich Lavyorov, Aleksey Vladimirovich Yablokov and Evgenii Mikhailovich Sergeev.

As head of the Green Union of Armenia, he was actively involved in nuclear policy in the country, claiming that the Metsamor Nuclear Power Plant did not meet internationally accepted nuclear safety standards, due to the lack of a containment vessel.

Sanasaryan was also actively involved in forestry within the country and in campaigning against the economic policy in Armenia that directly affected its natural landscape. The Armenian Copper Program (ACP) required that some 357.16 hectares of forest would be logged for the purpose of the exploitation of the copper and molybdenum mine in the village of Teghut in Lori Province, but Sanasaryan and the Green Union estimated that 170,833 trees would be logged, and objected on the grounds that many walnut, pine, apple and pear trees would be removed. He also expressed concern about the location of the site which he believed would affect the nature of soil composition in the area and makes it susceptible to dangerous landslides.

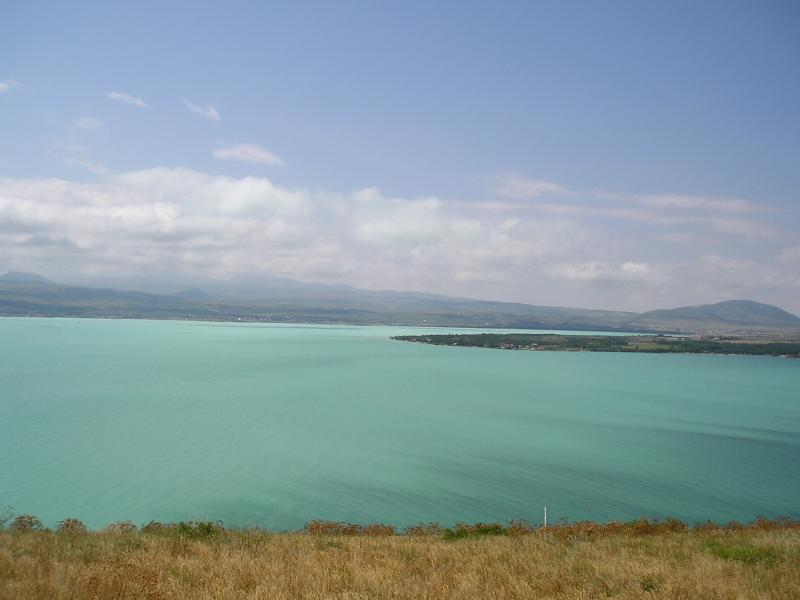
Lake Sevan

In 2005, Sanasaryan and the Green Union campaigned against the Ararat Gold Extraction Enterprise (AGEE), a branch of the Canadian Sterlite Gold Limited Companya who wanted to build a gold factory near its Gegharkunik mine in Sotk, posing a severe danger to the nearby Lake Sevan. The factory in processing gold from ore, would require the heavy usage of toxic chemicals, including cyanide. Hakob Sanasaryan declared that the factory would be a disaster on the regional environment, and due to the proposed factory's nearness to the lake, the discussion itself was anti-constitutional and therefore should not be held. With a discussion in which the Deputy Minister of Trade and Economic Development Gagik Vardanyan was involved it was indeed confirmed under Armenian legislation, that it was unlawful to build a mining factory even within a radius of 50 kilometers of Lake Sevan.

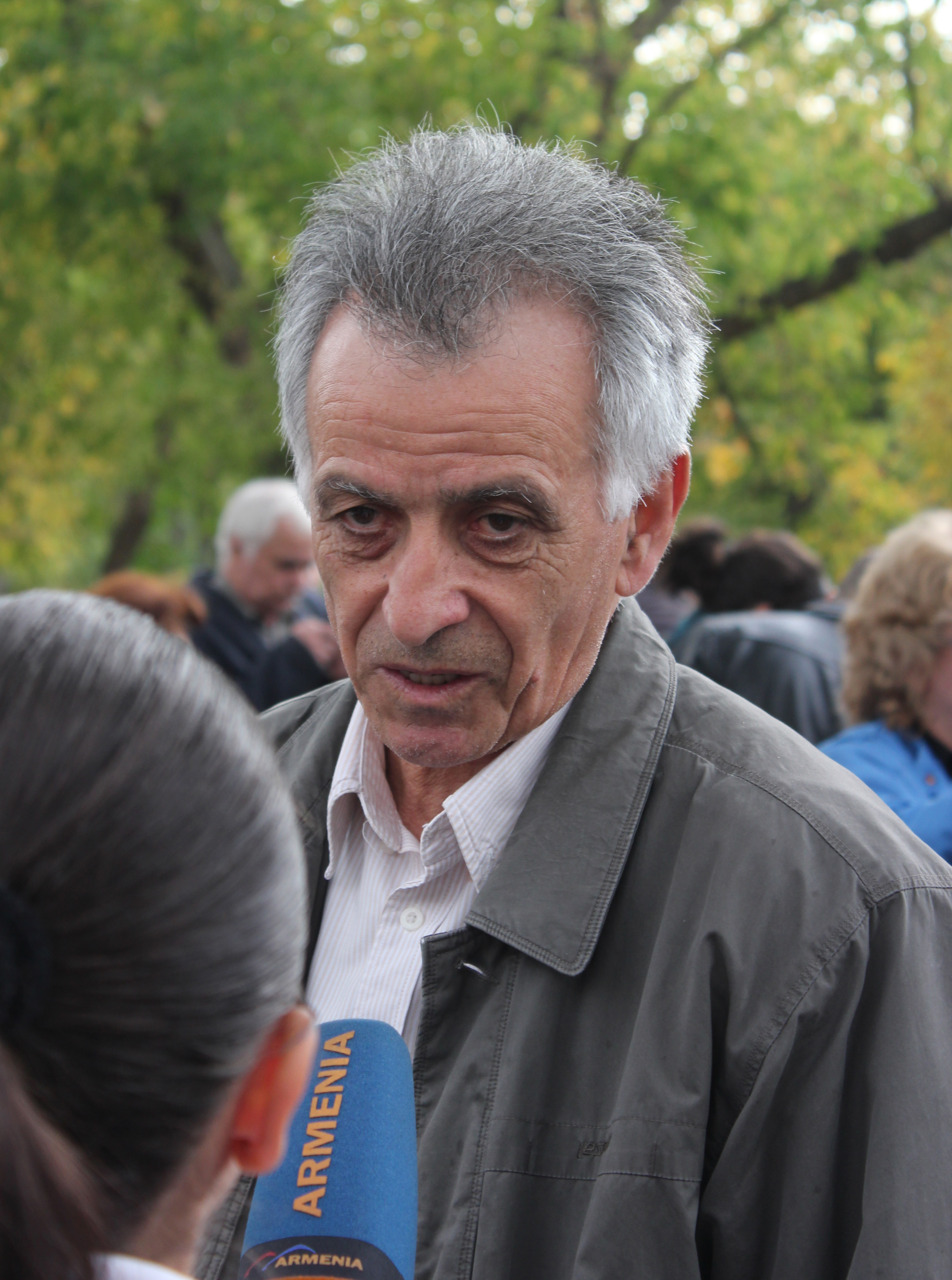
Sanasaryan campaigning against illegal construction of a new ore-processing facility in Sotk, 2011

Sanasaryan died on 9 October 2024, at the age of 87.
