= Gagik =

Gagik (in Western Armenian Kakig) is a common Armenian name. It may refer to:

Royalty / Nobility

- Gagik I of Armenia, Bagratid king of Armenia of the Bagratuni dynasty (989–1020)
- Gagik-Abas (died 1069), Bagratunid king of Kars (r. 1029–1064)
- Gagik Apumrvan Artsruni (died 898), Armenian prince of the Artsruni dynasty
- Gagik I of Vaspurakan (879/880 – 943), Artsruni ruler of Vaspurakan (908–943)
- Gagik II of Armenia (1025–1079), the last Armenian King of Armenia of the Bagratuni dynasty (1042–1045)
- Gagik of Kakheti (died 1058), King of Kakheti in eastern Georgia from 1039 to 1058

Contemporary

- Gagik Badalyan (born 1980), Armenian singer
- Gagik Beglaryan (born 1964), Armenian politician and economist
- Gagik Daghbashyan (born 1990), Armenian footballer
- Gagik Ghazanchyan (born 1960), Armenian artist
- Gagik Harutyunyan (born 1948), Armenian politician, Prime Minister of Armenia 1991–1992
- Gagik Hovunts (1930–2019), Armenian composer
- Gagik Khachatryan (born 1955), Armenian politician
- Gagik Khachatryan (born 1971), Armenian weightlifter
- Gagik Manukyan (1974–2002), Armenian footballer
- Gagik Petrosyan (born 1973), Armenian politician and statesman
- Gagik Sargsyan (1926–1998), Armenian historian and academic
- Gagik Shmavonyan (born 1963), Armenian professor and engineer
- Gagik Simonyan (born 1971), Armenian footballer and manager
- Gagik Siravyan (born 1970), Armenian artist
- Gagik Tadevosyan (1950–2024), Armenian politician and engineer
- Gagik Tsarukyan (born 1956), also known by his nickname Dodi Gago, Armenian politician and businessman, founder of Prosperous Armenia party
- Gagik Yeganyan (1956–2026), Armenian politician
- Gago Drago (born 1985), real name Gagik Harutyunyan, Armenian-Dutch welterweight kickboxer
