= Nikolay Semyonov =

Soviet physicist and chemist (1896–1986)

- Николай Семёнов
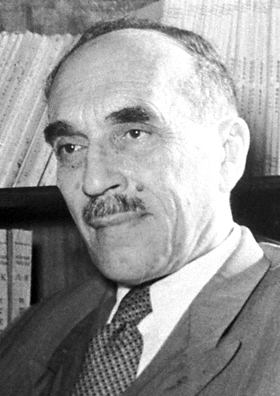
- Semyonov in 1956
- Born: Nikolay Nikolayevich Semyonov; 15 April [O.S. 3 April] 1896; Saratov, Saratov Governorate, Russian Empire
- Died: 25 September 1986 (aged 90); Moscow, Soviet Union
- Resting place: Novodevichy Cemetery
- Education: Saint Petersburg State University
- Known for: Chemical transformation
- Awards: Nobel Prize in Chemistry (1956); Lomonosov Gold Medal (1969)
- Scientific career
- Fields: Physics, chemistry
- Workplaces: Peter the Great St. Petersburg Polytechnic University, MSU, Ioffe Institute, Semenov Institute of Chemical Physics, MIPT
- Doctoral advisor: Abram Ioffe
- Doctoral students: David A. Frank-Kamenetskii, Yulii Khariton, Nikolay Emanuel, Aram Nalbandyan
- Other notable students: Yakov Zeldovich

Nikolay Nikolayevich Semyonov ForMemRS, sometimes Semenov, Semionov or Semenoff (Russian: Никола́й Никола́евич Семёнов; 15 April [O.S. 3 April] 1896 – 25 September 1986) was a Soviet physicist and chemist. Semyonov was awarded the 1956 Nobel Prize in Chemistry for his work on the mechanism of chemical transformation. He made a significant contribution to the development of chemical kinetics.

He was the first Soviet Nobel prize winner and the only Soviet Nobel laureate in Chemistry (1956). Semenov was an academician of the Academy of Sciences of the Soviet Union (1932, corresponding member since 1929). He had been awarded the title of Hero of Socialist Labour twice (1966 and 1976).

== Biography ==
Semenov was born in Saratov on April 3^{rd} (15^{th}) in 1896, the first child of Nikolay Aleksandrovich Semenov, a clerk in the Saratov Udel District, and Yelena Aleksandrovna Dmitrieva. Yelena Aleksandrovna obtained an education through completion of Bestuzhev Courses, and was a mathematics teacher. In 1897, the family relocated to a rural area of Saratov Oblast where his father took on a new position. Afterwards, Nikolay, his mother and his sister Ksenia (born in 1898) moved to Volsk, where he enrolled in a real school. It was at this time that his interest in chemistry began to take shape.

In 1910, his father was appointed as a government inspector in Samara Udel District and the family had moved to Samara, where Nikolay had graduated from Samara Real School in 1913. In 6^{th} grade he came across two books that left a profound impression on him: one by Svante Arrhenius and the other by Jacobus van’t Hoff. Later, the 38‑year‑old Semenov, in the preface to «Chain Reactions» — the main work of his life — would call the authors of these books “my great teachers in absentia, whose books prompted me to study physics with a special task to learn to apply it to chemical problems.”

In July of 1913, Nikolay Semenov enrolled in the mathematics department of the Faculty of Physics and Mathematics at Petrograd University. The admission to the university required basic knowledge of ancient languages, which had not been taught in the Samara Real School. Nevertheless, having prepared in a short time, Semenov had passed the exam in the 1^{st} Samara Men’s Gymnasium. Already from his second year in the university, he engaged in experimental research under the direction of Abram Fyodorovich Ioffe and carried out several studies on the ionization of atoms and molecules under the influence of electron impact in gas discharges. Nikolay Semenov graduated from the university in 1917 with a first‑class degree and was retained at the university as a professorial scholarship holder (analogous to a postgraduate student).

In the spring of 1918, Semenov went to visit his parents for the holidays, where he was caught up in the revolt of the Czechoslovak Legion. In June of 1918, power in Samara had passed to the Committee of Members of the Constituent Assembly and in July Nikolay volunteered to serve in their army as a horse-holder in an artillery battery. After serving for three weeks, he had received news of his father’s serious illness (who passed away shortly after) and managed to secure leave to go home. Then Semenov went to Tomsk, the nearest university city that was accessible under the wartime conditions.

From September 1918 to March 1920 (with a break), he worked at Tomsk University and Tomsk Institute of Technology — in the laboratory of the physics department, which was headed by professor Boris Weinberg. In September 1919 he was enlisted into Kolchak's White Army, but a month later, at Weinberg’s request, he was transferred to the radio battalion and seconded to the Technological Institute, where he was able to continue his scientific research. In December 1917, the Red Army occupied Tomsk and the radio battalion became a part of it. In late January 1920, at the request of the management of Tomsk University, he was dismissed from service in the Red Army and continued his academic and teaching work.

In May 1920, Nikolay Semenov returned to Petrograd at the invitation of Abram Ioffe, who was engaged in establishing the Physico‑Technical X‑ray Institute, and headed the laboratory of electronic phenomena. In 1922, he was appointed vicedirector of the Physico‑Technical Institute.

In 1921, he married philologist Maria Boreishe-Liverovsky (student of Zhirmunsky). She died two years later. On September 15, 1924, Nikolay married Maria's niece, Natalia Nikolayevna Burtseva. They had two children, son Yuri and daughter Lyudmila.

From 1928, Nikolay Semenov was also a part‑time professor at the Leningrad Polytechnic Institute, where he worked until he was transferred to Moscow. From 1928 to 1932, he was deputy dean of the Faculty of Physics and Mechanics and initiated the establishment of studies in chemical physics at the institute. From 1927, he headed the chemical and physical department of the Physico‑Technical Institute, on the basis of which he founded the Institute of Chemical Physics (IChPh) of the Academy of Sciences of the Soviet Union in 1931. He remained its director until his passing in 1986.

In 1929, he was elected a corresponding member of the Academy of Sciences of the Soviet Union, and in 1932, its academician.

In 1934, he published the monograph “Chemical Kinetics and Chain Reactions” in which he established the existence of a chain or branched chain reaction mechanism responsible for many chemical processes, including polymerization reactions.

With the outbreak of the Great Patriotic War in 1941, he was evacuated to Kazan, where he worked on problems related to combustion and explosion. In 1943, together with the Institute of Chemical Physics, he returned to Moscow.

From 1944, Semenov began teaching at Moscow State University. In the same year, he established the Department of Chemical Kinetics at the Faculty of Chemistry, which he headed for over 40 years.

Together with Pyotr Kapitsa, he was one of the founders of the Moscow Institute of Physics and Technology in 1946. Semenov was the creator and scientific director of the institute’s Faculty of Molecular and Chemical Physics.

In the 1940s and 1950s, he participated in the Soviet atomic bomb project.

In 1947, Semenov joined the CPSU; he was a candidate member of the CPSU Central Committee from 1961 to 1966 and was elected as a deputy to the Supreme Soviet of the USSR three times. On June 12, 1966, he was elected as a deputy from Ishimbay.

In 1958, Semenov was the 12th Mendeleev Reader. He held the positions of academician‑secretary of the Department of Chemical Sciences of the USSR Academy of Sciences (1957–1971) and Vice‑President of the USSR Academy of Sciences from 4 July 1963 to 28 May 1971. In 1960–1963, he was the chairman of the board of the All‑Union Society “Znanie”; he was succeeded in this post by Vladimir Kirillin. Since 1981, he has been the editor‑in‑chief of the journal “Chemical Physics”. He was an active participant in the scientists’ movement against the threat of nuclear war.

A number of prominent chemists and physicists grew up under Semenov’s tutelage: Yakov Zeldovich, Viktor Kondratyev, Yulii Khariton, Kirill Shchelkin, Nikolay Emanuel, David Frank-Kamenetskii and many more.

Nikolay Semenov passed away on September 25, 1986. He is buried at the Novodevichy Cemetery in Moscow. The author of the tombstone is soviet sculptor Vladimir Fedorov.

== Scientific contributions ==
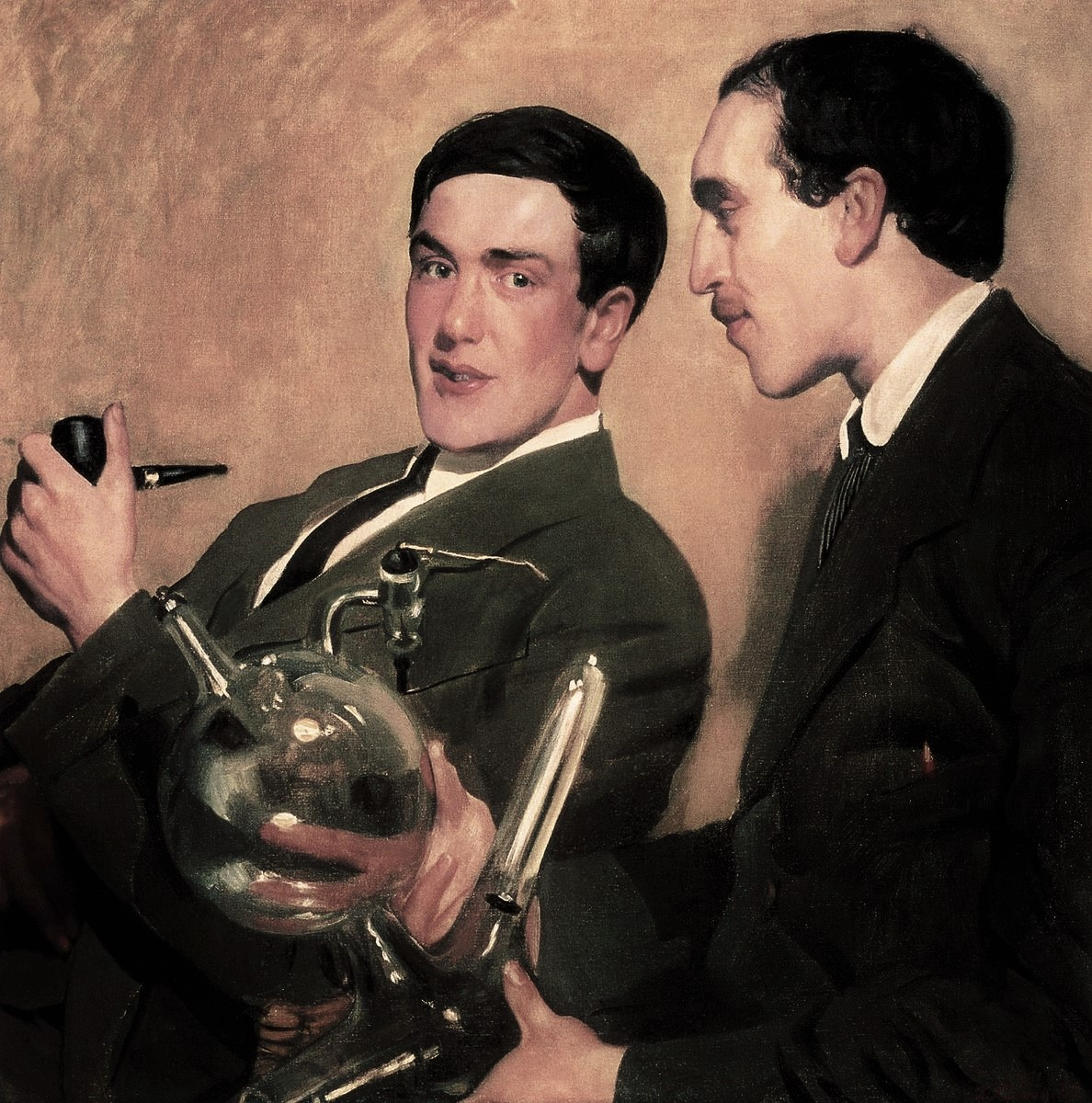
Semenov (right) and Kapitsa, portrait by Boris Kustodiev, 1921.

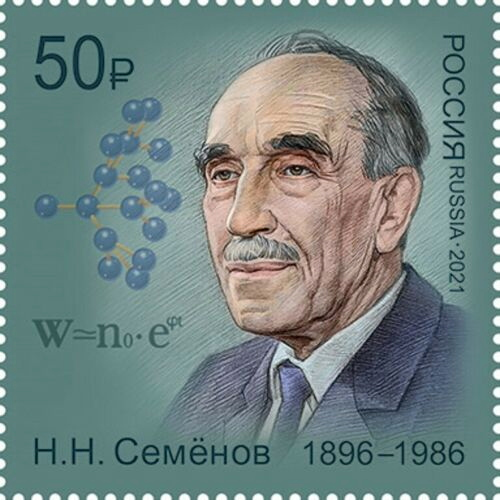
Semenov on a 2021 stamp of Russia

Semenov’s main scientific achievements include the quantitative theory of chemical chain reactions, the theory of thermal explosion, and the combustion of gas mixtures.

The first issue that Semenov began to address as early as 1916 was the problem of gas ionization. By the early 1920s, he had begun working on the mechanisms of dielectric breakdown, which resulted in the development of the thermal theory of breakdown. This theory formed the basis of the thermal theory of ignition (1928), which was further developed in works on the theory of combustion and thermal explosion (late 1930s – early 1940s). This enabled the consideration of processes such as flame propagation, detonation, and the combustion of explosives.

In 1920, Semenov together with Kapitsa calculated the deflection of a beam of paramagnetic atoms in an inhomogeneous magnetic field. Similar experiments with improved setup were conducted in 1921 by O. Stern and W. Gerlach which led to the concept of spatial quantization. In 1924, together with Khariton, he discovered the critical density and condensation temperature. Later, they discovered critical phenomena which set the limit of chemical reactions in the oxidation processes of a number of substances (1926–1928).

The most well-known work of Nikolay Semenov is his discovery in 1928 of branched chain reactions, characterized by exponential growth and subsequent ignition. At the same time period (late 1920s — early 1930s), he also demonstrated the radical mechanism of the chain process and substantiated all its main features — the low activation energy, the preservation and increase in the number of free valencies, the role of the vessel walls and impurities in chain termination, etc. This opened up broad prospects for controlling chemical processes. In 1963, together with A. E. Shilov, he established the role of energetic processes (through the transfer of energy from high‑energy products to the initial molecules) in the development of chain reactions at high temperatures. For developing the theory of chain reactions, Semenov was awarded the Nobel Prize in Chemistry in 1956 (together with Cyril Hinshelwood).

N. N. Semenov is the author of the scientific discovery “The Phenomenon of Energy Branching in Chemical Reactions,” which is registered in the State Register of Discoveries of the USSR under No. 172, with priority dating back to 1962.

Semenov improved Bodenstein’s method of quasi-steady state approximation, which for a long time was virtually the only basis for carrying out practical kinetic calculations. In Bodenstein’s method the rates of change of the quantities of all intermediate species were equated to zero, however, Semenov pointed out that this rule is applicable only to species with high reactivity (radicals, ions). The Bodenstein–Semenov method is the first attempt to separate time scales in mathematical models of chemical kinetics.

A number of Semenov’s works are devoted to the study of catalytic processes. He discovered the ion‑heterogeneous type of catalysis and developed the theory of heterogeneous catalysis (1955, jointly with V. V. Voevodsky and F. F. Volkenstein). The results of Semenov’s research, achieved in a variety of fields, have found widespread practical application.

== Honours and awards ==
- Mendeleev Prize (1936) – for the monograph “Chemical Kinetics and Chain Reactions”
- Stalin Prize (1941, 1949)
- Orders of Lenin, nine times (incl. 1945, 1953, 1956, 1966, 1971, 1976, 1981)
- Honorary Member of the British Chemical Society (1943)
- Order of the Red Banner of Labour (1946)
- Honorary member of the Indian Academy of Sciences (1954)
- Nobel Prize in Chemistry (1956)
- Foreign Member of the Royal Society of London (1958)
- Member of the German Academy of Sciences Leopoldina (1959)
- Honorary member of the Hungarian Academy of Sciences (1961)
- Honorary member of the New York Academy of Sciences (1962)
- Foreign member of the United States National Academy of Sciences (1963)
- Honorary Member of the Romanian Academy (1965)
- Hero of Socialist Labour, twice (1966, 1976)
- Lomonosov Gold Medal (1969)
- Lenin Prize (1976)
- Order of the October Revolution (1986)
- Jubilee Medal "In Commemoration of the 100th Anniversary of the Birth of Vladimir Ilyich Lenin"
- Honorary Member of The Soviet Academy of Sciences (1932)

Semenov was also an Honorary Doctor of several universities: Oxford (1960), Brussels (1962), London (1965), Budapest Technical University (1965), Polytechnic Institute of Milan (1964) and others.

== Legacy ==
- In 1990, the IChPh RAS was named after N. N. Semyonov;
- In 1994, a memorial plaque was unveiled in honor of Nikolay Nikolayevich Semyonov on the main building of the St. Petersburg State Polytechnic University (29 Politechnicheskaya Street);
- The memorial plaque is installed on the facade of the Main building of the A.F. Ioffe Institute of Physics and Technology in St. Petersburg (26 Politechnicheskaya str.).
- On July 27, 1996, and one of the streets in the South-Western Administrative District of the city of Moscow on the territory of the Yuzhnoye Butovo District was given the name Academician Semyonov Street;
- In Saratov, one of the streets is named after Semyonov;
- In Tyumen, one of the streets is named after Semyonov;
- A memorial plaque is installed on the house in Moscow at 24 Frunzenskaya Embankment, where Semyonov spent his last years of life;
- The Presidium of the Russian Academy of Sciences has a Commission for the development of the scientific heritage of Academician N. N. Semyonov;
- Airliner Airbus A321 (VQ-BOI) of the airline "Aeroflot" "N. Semyonov";
- On April 5, 2019, in Moscow on the territory of National Research Nuclear University "MEPhI" a monument was erected by the sculptor Alexandra Mironova
- At the beginning of April 2022, a monument to Academician Nikolai Semyonov was unveiled in Moscow on Kosygin Street, house 4, near IChPh.

== See also ==
- Chain reaction
- Chemical kinetics
- Chemical reaction network theory
- Semenov theory
- Evans–Polanyi–Semenov principle
