= Vandika Ervandovna Avetisyan =

Armenian botanist

Vandika Ervandovna Avetisyan (born October 5, 1928) is a Doctor of Biology and a noted Armenian botanist and mycologist. She has worked and explored extensively in her native Armenia under the auspices of the Institute of Botany of the Armenian National Academy of Sciences. Her alma mater is Yerevan State University, the oldest and most prestigious of Yerevan's universities. The standard author abbreviation V.E.Avet. is used to indicate this person as the author when citing a botanical name..

== Alternative Names ==
Avetissjan, Vanda E.; Avetisian, Vanda E.; Avetissian, Vanda E.

== See also ==
- List of women botanists
- List of Armenian scientists and philosophers
- Lists of Armenians
- List of female scientists in the 20th century
- List of female scientists in the 21st century
