= Aram Nalbandyan =

Soviet-Armenian physicist (1908–1987)

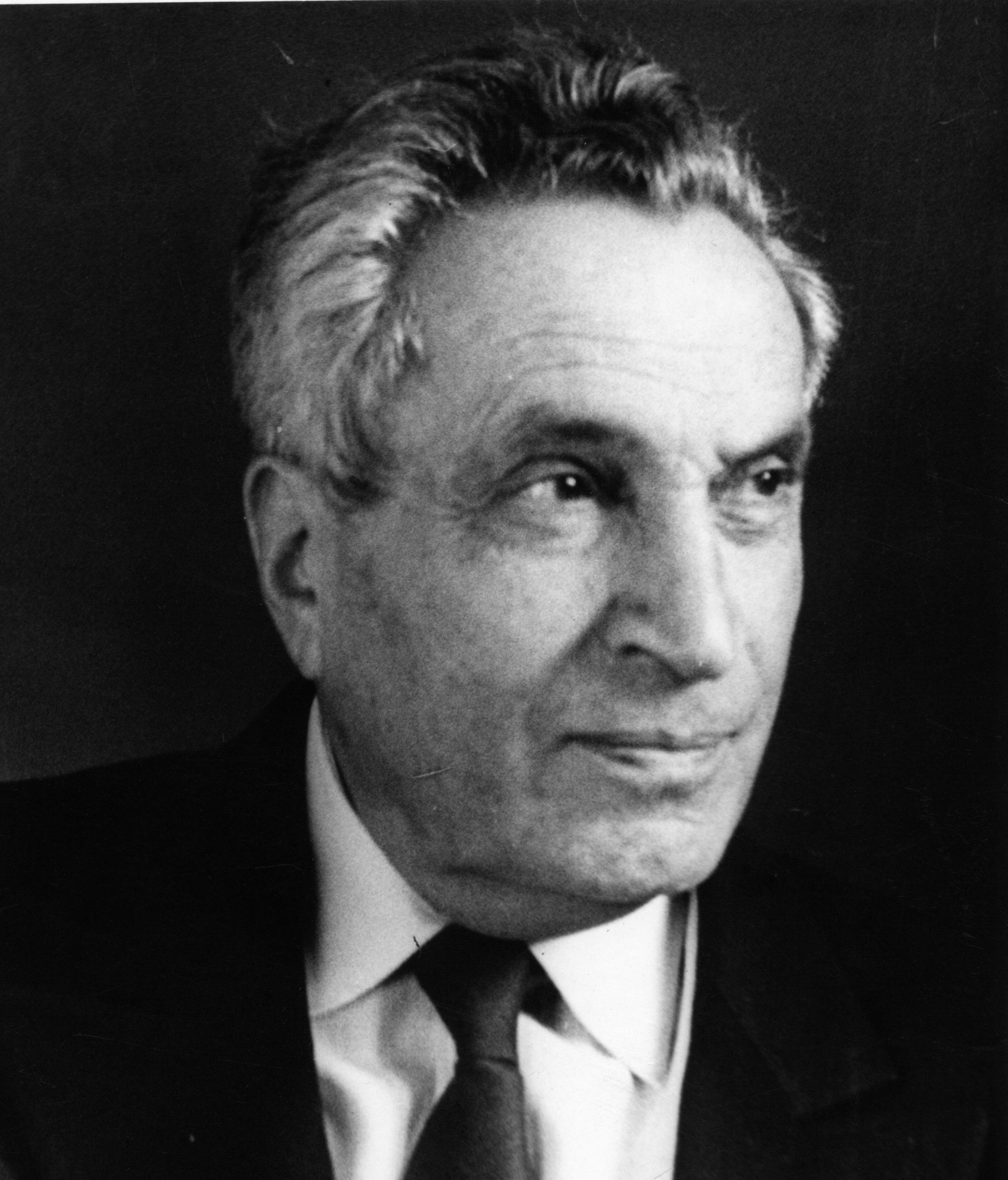
- Born: 1 January 1908; Karakilisa, Russian Empire
- Died: 24 January 1987 (aged 79); Yerevan, Armenian SSR, Soviet Union
- Citizenship: Soviet
- Education: Yerevan State University
- Known for: Investigation of branched chain reactions
- Awards: Order of Red Banner of Labour (2); Order of Lenin
- Scientific career
- Fields: Physicist and chemist
- Workplaces: Institute of Chemical Physics, Academy of Sciences of USSR, Yerevan Institute of Physical Chemistry, Armenian Academy of Sciences
- Doctoral advisor: Nikolay Semyonov

Aram Bagrati "Bagratovich" Nalbandyan (Armenian: Արամ Բագրատի Նալբանդյան, 1 January 1908 – 24 January 1987) was a Soviet and Armenian physicist, prominent in the field of physical chemistry, founder of the Institute of Chemical Physics in Yerevan, Armenia, and academician-secretary of the Chemical Department of the Armenian Academy of Sciences (AS). He is the author of more than 400 scientific articles and five monographs.

== Biography ==
Aram Nalbandyan was born in Karakilisa (now Vanadzor). He lost his father at an early age. His grandfather, a farrier, raised him, implanting a love for work and appreciation for nature. Nalbandyan received his general education at the local school.

After school in Karaklise, Nalbandyan started his education in the Department of Physics and Mathematics of Pedagogical Faculty of the Yerevan State University. Many highly educated Armenians, including graduates from the universities of Moscow, Petersburg and Europe, were teaching there at that time. Among them were professors of physics H. Navakatikyan and H. Anjour, professor of mathematics B. Bagaturyan, professor of physical chemistry L. Rotinyan, and academician A. Hakopyan. They all contributed greatly to the development of young Aram Nalbandyan. As a student, Nalbandyan worked at the laboratory and participated in the scientific club led by H. Navakatikyan. After graduating from the university in 1930, he worked at the department as an assistant and also delivered lectures on molecular physics.

In 1931 a new Institute of Chemical Physics (ICP) was created in Leningrad (Saint Petersburg). The position of the chief of Institute was assigned to Nikolay Semyonov, the disciple of the academician A. F. Ioffe. Semyonov, the future Nobel prize winner, had big plans for developing science at his institute. To carry out these plans he decided to involve young talented graduates from other cities of the USSR. From the Yerevan State University, Aram Nalbandyan was chosen to go to Leningrad where he joined the group of highly motivated young scientists.

Nalbandyan's research was dedicated to the studies of the kinetics and mechanism of branched chain reactions. Between 1931 and 1950 he investigated in detail the mechanism of oxidation of hydrogen as an example of a branched chain reaction. The collected experimental data and its careful theoretical processing became a brilliant proof of the main principles of the theory of the branched chain reactions that were formulated by N.N. Semyonov.

On the basis of his experimental and theoretical research, Nalbandyan obtained his Candidate (1935) and Doctoral (1943) degrees.

During World War II, the Institute of Chemical Physics was relocated from Leningrad to the city of Kazan. There, while his wife Bella L. Nalbandyan (Sinaeva) worked as a Medical Chief of the Army Hospital, Nalbandyan studied methods of production of explosives and their characteristics. For his achievements he was awarded with the medal for Heroic Labor During the Great Patriotic War (1946).

In 1949 jointly with V.V. Voyevodsky he published the monograph "Mechanism of Hydrogen Oxidation and Combustion". This monograph was honored with D.I. Mendeleev's Prize in 1952.

From 1957 to 1966 Nalbandyan headed the Laboratory of Hydrocarbon Oxidation at Institute of Chemical Physics AS USSR (Moscow). From 1951 to 1959 was the Chair of the Department of Physics at the Moscow Electrotechnical Institute of Communications.

Research on degenerated branching in oxidation of organic compounds done by Nalbandyan and his colleagues was an important contribution to the theory of chain reactions.

A series of researches on the mechanism of methane oxidation resulted in a proposal for the industrial production of formaldehyde by direct methane oxidation. In 1962 the authors of this work, headed by Nalbandyan, were awarded a Big Gold Medal of the Exhibition of Economic Achievements of the USSR.

In 1959 Nalbandyan published a popular scientific book entitled Formaldehyde - a Material for Plastics, written jointly with Nikolay Enikolopov.

While living in Moscow, Nalbandyan was in close contact with the Armenian scientific community. He always headed the researches of the post-graduate students, trainees and graduates of Yerevan higher schools.

In 1959, at the suggestion of the Presidium of the Armenian AS, Nalbandyan founded the Laboratory of Chemical Physics, a new scientific center in Yerevan. In 1960 he was elected a Corresponding member, and in 1963 a full member of the Armenian AS.

In 1967 Nalbandyan and his wife moved from Moscow to Yerevan, where he was appointed Director of the Laboratory of Chemical Physics. He was also elected academician-secretary of the Department of Chemistry of the Armenian AS. In 1975 the laboratory was reorganized as the Yerevan Institute of Chemical Physics. Until the very end of his life, Nalbandyan was the Director and scientific leader of the institute which now bears his name.

Scientists of the institute used the kinetic method, developed by Nalbandyan and his colleagues, of radical freezing in combination with ESR-spectrometer for detecting polyatomic radicals in gas phase reactions. They were the first to obtain direct experimental data about free radicals in complex, degenerated branched chain reactions which allowed to investigate chemical reactions at a new, higher level and to approach the ways of controlling them for practical purposes.

In his last years Nalbandyan paid enormous attention to the processes taking place on the surface of the chemical reactor. Based on the results of studies in this field he concluded that depending on the process conditions, the chain branching could occur on the walls of the reactor as a result of decomposition of unstable intermediate compounds, such as peroxides, with the ejection of radicals into the reactor volume where they will continue the chain propagation in the gas phase.

The results of investigations on the kinetics and mechanism of complex reactions were summarized in Nalbandyan's three monographs written jointly with his disciples: A.A. Mantashyan, I.A. Vardanyan, and Y.M. Gershenson.

Contributions were made to the development of new scientific areas, including the reactions of free radicals in liquid phase, chemical catalysis, and solid phase combustion. In the early seventies Nalbandyan took the initiative to start research on self-propagating high temperature synthesis of valuable inorganic materials at the institute. These studies were headed by A.G. Merzhanov, the founder of this scientific direction at the ICP of AS USSR. They are successfully continuing these days.

Nalbandyan was actively involved in scientific and social activities; he was Chief Editor of the Armenian Chemical Journal, a member of the editorial board of the journal Khimicheskaya Fizika, a member of the editorial committee of the Armenian Encyclopedia, and a member of the Terminology Committee under the Council of Ministers of Armenian SSR. He also paid attention to establishing and developing international relationships, participated in many international conferences and symposiums, and often gave lectures outside of the USSR. These included a course of lectures in Canada, lectures in the Goettingen University (1973) as a Gauss-Professor, and lectures in the Catholic University of Leuven, Belgium. In 1979 he joined the New York Academy of Sciences.

Nalbandyan died in Yerevan at the age of 79.

=== Degrees and nominations ===
- Candidate of Physical and Mathematical Sciences, 1935
- Doctor of Physical and Mathematical Sciences, 1943
- Professor, 1947
- Corresponding Member of the AS, Armenian SSR, 1960
- Academician of the AS, Armenian SSR, 1963
- Academician-Secretary of Department of Chemical Sciences of AS, Armenian SSR, 1967-1987

== Awards ==
- Order of the Badge of Honour (1945)
- Medal for Heroic Labor During Patriotic War (1946)
- D.I. Mendeleev's Prize (1952)
- Two Orders of the Red Banner of Labour (1954, 1977)
- Big Gold Medal of the Exhibition of Economic Achievements of the USSR (1962)
- Jubilee Medal "In Commemoration of the 100th Anniversary of the Birth of Vladimir Ilyich Lenin" (1970)
- Order of Lenin (1986)

== Publications ==
- V.V. Voyevodski, A. B. Nalbandyan "Mechanism of Hydrogen Oxidation and Combustion", Moscow, 1949
- A. B. Nalbandyan, N.S. Enikolopov "Formaldehyde- a material for plastics", Moscow, 1959
- A. B. Nalbandyan, A.A. Mantashyan "Elementary Processes in Slow Gas Phase Reactions", Yerevan, 1975
- A. B. Nalbandyan, I.A. Vardanyan "Modern State of the Problem of Gas Phase Oxidation of Organic Compounds", Yerevan, 1986
- A. B. Nalbandyan, Y.M. Gershenson "Magnetic Resonance in Gases", Yerevan, 1987
