= Semenov Institute of Chemical Physics =

Russian research institute

The Semenov Institute of Chemical Physics of Russian Academy of Sciences (RAS) (now known as the Semenov ICP in Moscow; Russian: Институт химической физики им. Н. Н. Семёнова, Москва, учреждение Российской академии наук), was established in 1931 under the direction of Professor Nikolay Semyonov, Nobel Laureate in Chemistry (1956) on the basis of the Physico-Chemical Sector of the Leningrad Physical Technical Institute (Ioffe Institute). The staff of the Institute includes about 450 researchers. The Institute has been situated in Moscow since 1943. It is affiliated with the Moscow State University and has chairs at the Moscow Institute of Physics and Technology.

The Institute's aim has been defined as "the implementation of physical theories and methods into chemistry, chemical industry and some other branches of national economy". Its main areas of scientific inquiry are the kinetics and mechanism of chemical reactions, catalysis of chemical reactions, theory and dynamics of elementary processes, physics and chemistry of solids, structure and properties of polymers and composites, fundamentals of polymerization processes, physics and chemistry of combustion, shock waves and detonation.

In 1956, a branch of the Institute of Chemical Physics was established in Chernogolovka; this was reorganized in 1997 as the independent Institute of Problems of Chemical Physics (IPCP RAS). Another department of the Semenov Institute was reorganized in 1994 as the N. M. Emanuel Institute of Biochemical Physics in Moscow of the Russian Academy of Sciences.
