= Hal Markarian =

Armenian American aircraft designer

Hal Markarian (1929–2012) was an Armenian American aircraft designer who is known for implementing the initial designs of the B-2 Spirit stealth bomber. He, along with Wesley Kirk, produced a sketch that was the inspiration for the modern B-2 Spirit. Today's B-2 Spirit incorporates much of Markarian's design.

== Design for the B-2 Spirit ==
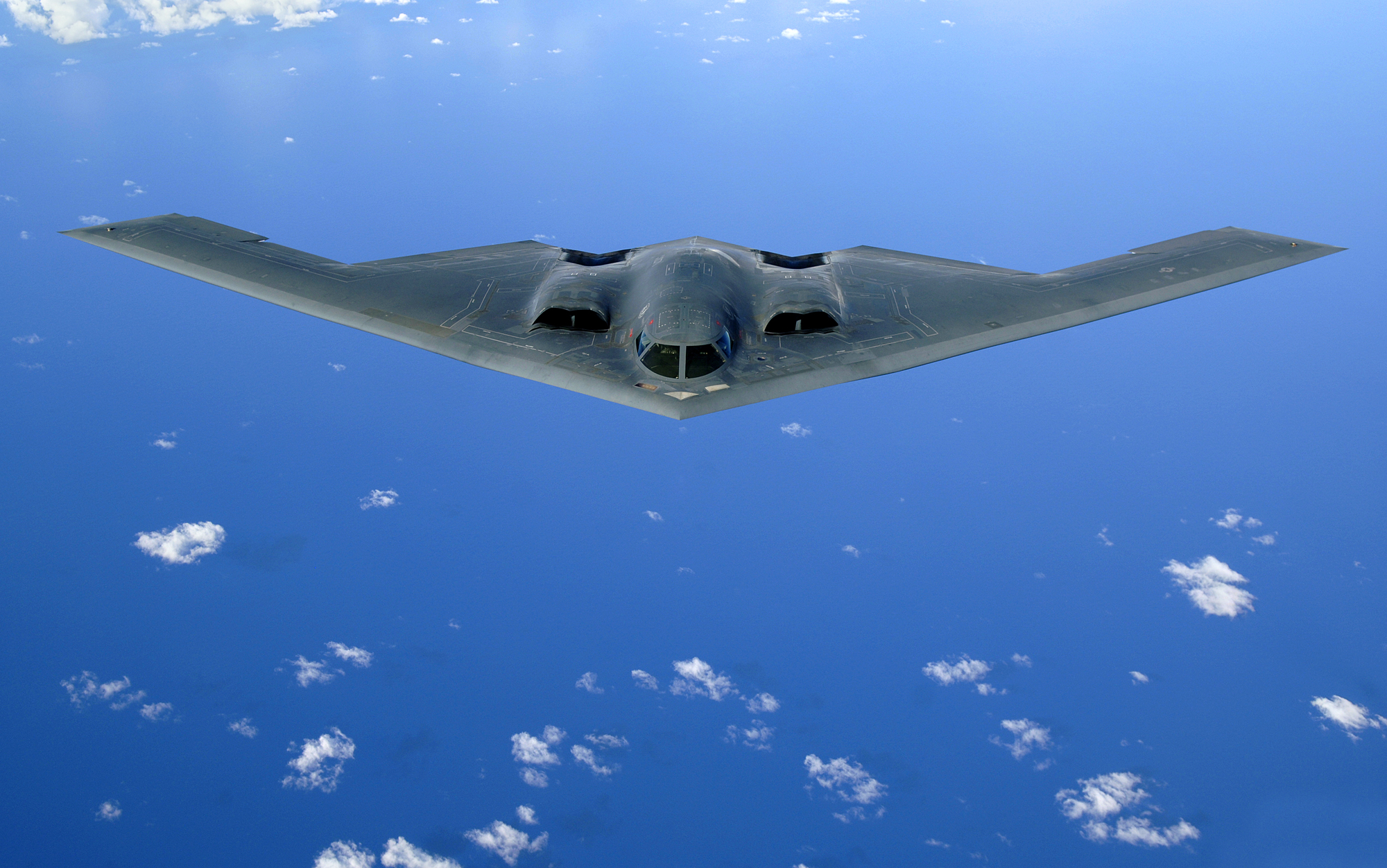
The B-2 Spirit took up its design from Hal Markarian

During the initial project of the stealth bomber, Hal Markarian was appointed as project manager.

The first sketches of the aircraft were done by Markarian in June 1979. Markarian's proposal was one of the two designs that were considered in the making of the stealth bomber. Markarian's proposal was very similar to the YB-49, an aircraft designed by Northrop three decades earlier in 1947.

The final design was influenced by Irv Waaland and John Cashen, who were experts in stealth technology. The team also included aerodynamicist Hans Grellman, as well as Dick Scherrer, a designer who had arrived from Lockheed. The design was much lighter and thinner than the modern B-2 stealth bomber, and had six engines equipped, most likely GE F404. The aircraft had a diamond shaped center body which served to accommodate a crew, fuselage and weapons.

The aircraft design that Northrop Grumman would later adopt was similar, though it had a deeper center-section of the aircraft than Markarian's design. Due to demands from the Strategic Air Command, the aircraft was also made much heavier and had larger weapon carriers.
