= Nikolay Emanuel =

Soviet chemist

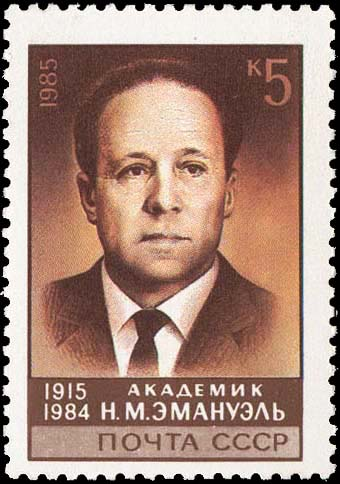
Nikolay Emanuel on a 1985 Soviet stamp

Nikolay Markovich Emanuel (Russian: Никола́й Ма́ркович Эмануэ́ль; October 1, 1915 – December 7, 1984) was a Soviet chemist. He was a key specialist in chemical kinetics and mechanics of chemical reactions. He lectured at Moscow State University since 1944 (and was appointed full Professor in 1950). In 1958 he became a corresponding member and in 1966 he became a full member of the Soviet Academy of Sciences. In 1974, he was elected as a foreign member of the Royal Swedish Academy of Sciences. Buried in Moscow.
