= J. W. Kebabian =

Dr. John W. Kebabian was a neuropharmacologist and neuroscientist who was the first to discover that there were multiple subtypes of dopamine receptors. His pioneering work which was published in 1979 revolutionized the understanding of the role of dopamine receptors in cognition, movement and mental disorders. He died on May 1, 2012.
