= Yeranos =

Village in Gegharkunik, Armenia

Yeranos Երանոս
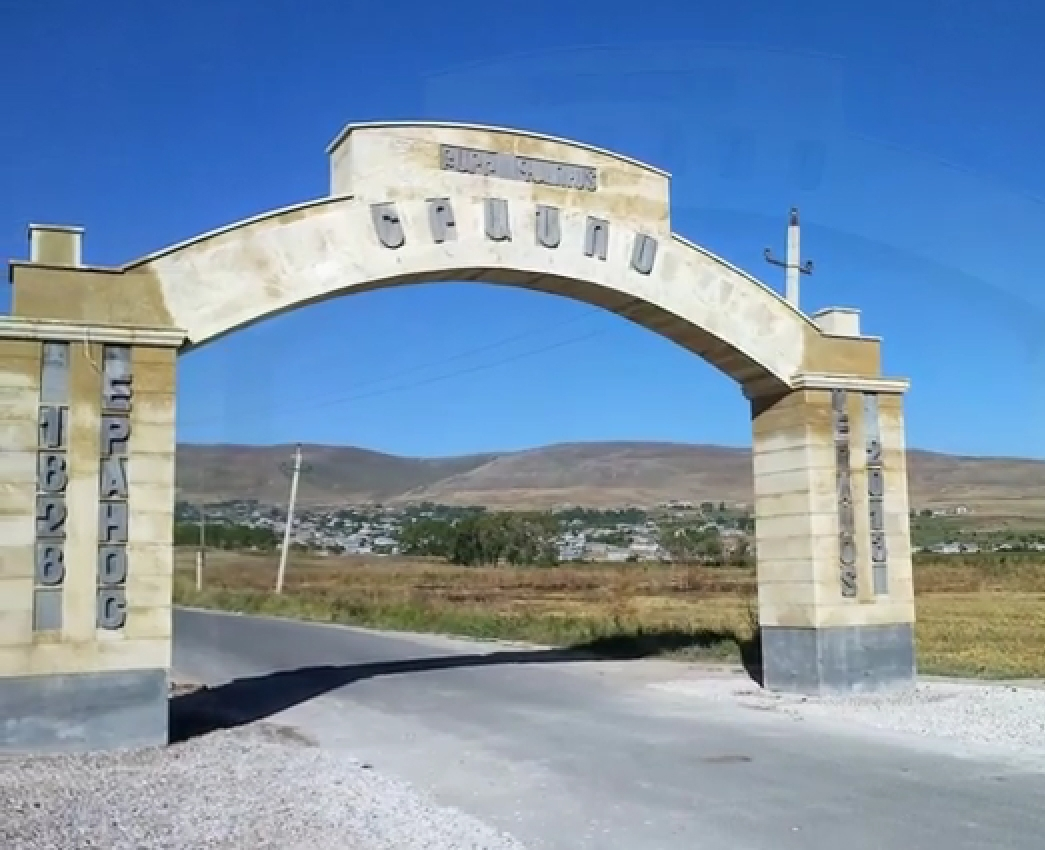
- Village entrance

- Location within Armenia Location within Gegharkunik
- Coordinates: 40°12′15″N 45°11′18″E
- Country: Armenia
- Province: Gegharkunik
- Municipality: Martuni
- Elevation: 2,007 m (6,585 ft)

Population (2011)
  - Total: 5,479
- Time zone: UTC+4 (AMT)
- Postal code: 1406

Yeranos (Armenian: Երանոս) is a village in the Martuni Municipality of the Gegharkunik Province of Armenia.

== History ==
The church of St. Astvatsatsin in the village dates back to 1215, and the village also contains Tukh Manuk and St. Sofia shrines. Following the Gavar-Martuni road, near the chicken farm, are the remains of a cyclopean fort.

== Gallery ==
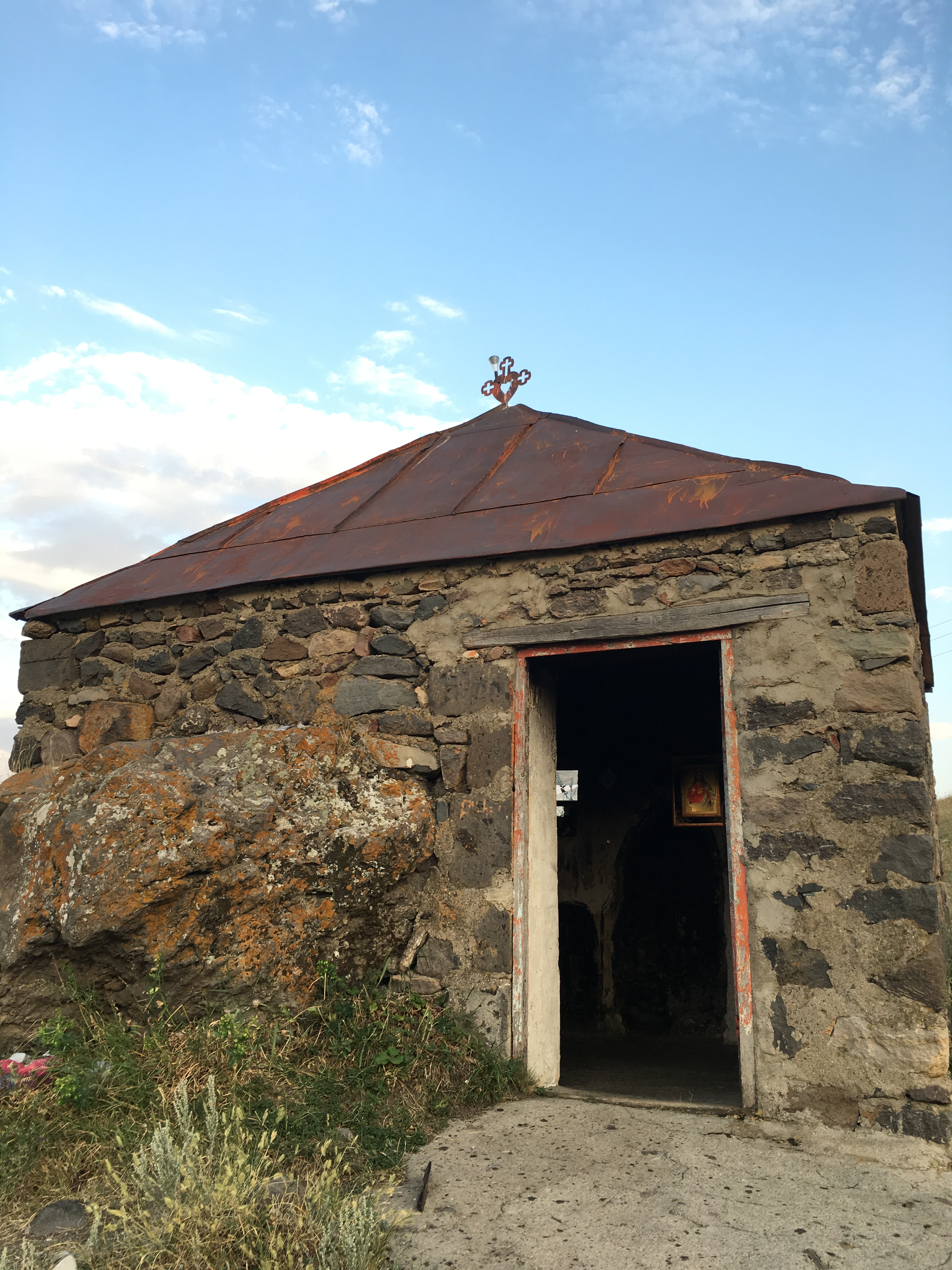
Chapel in Yeranos

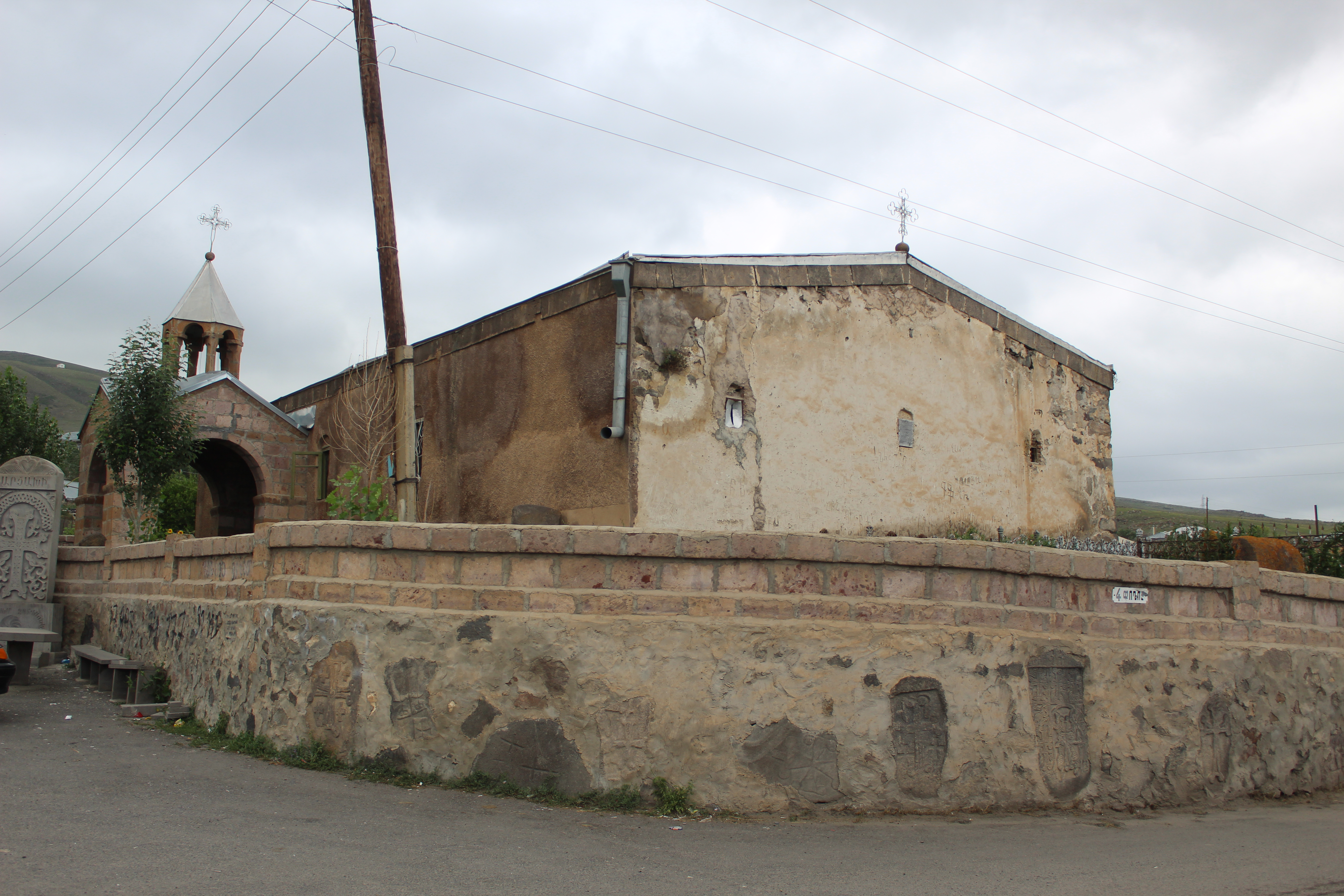
St. Astvatsatsin Church in Yeranos

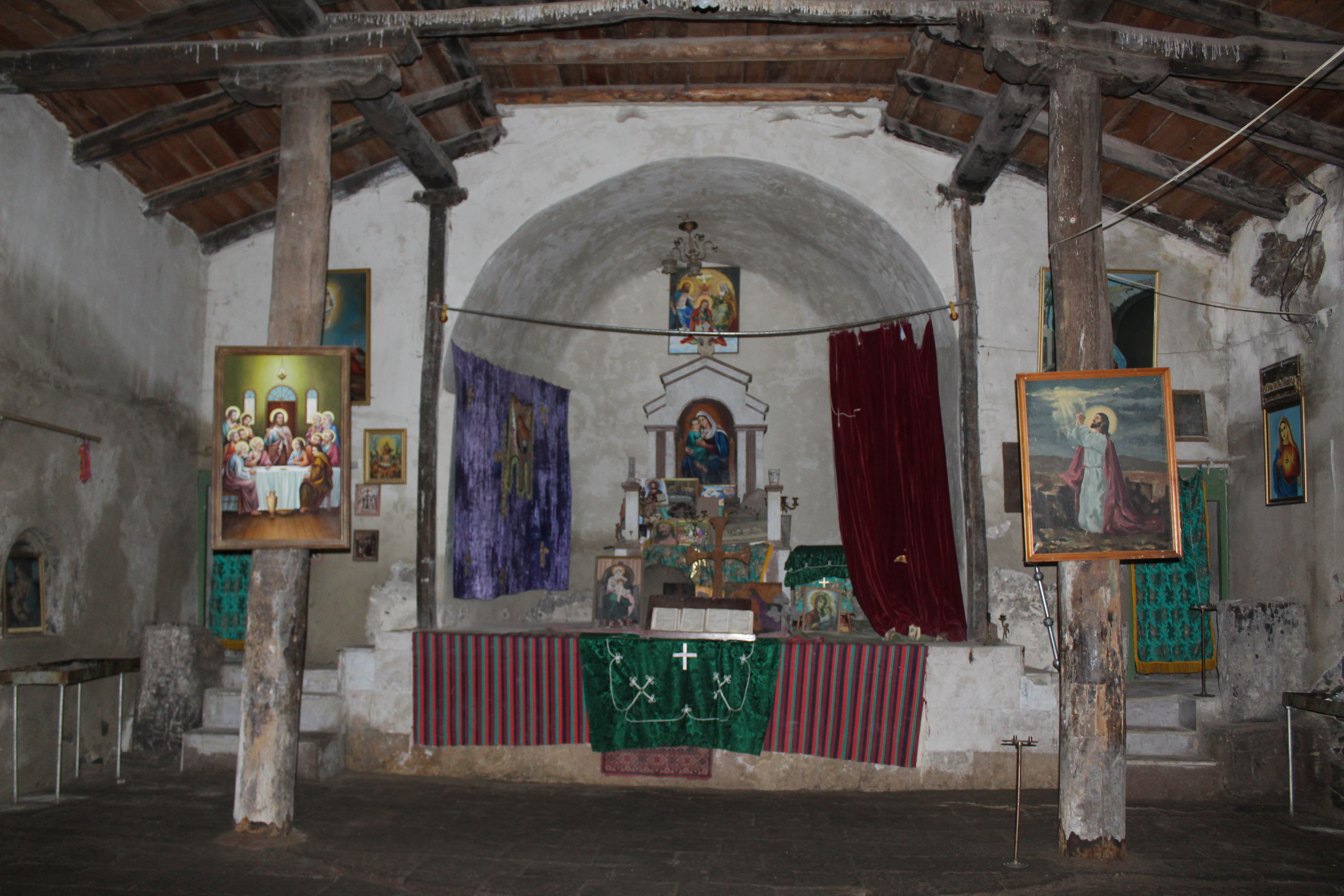
St. Astvatsatsin Church interior
