= Natalya Melik Melikyan =

Armenian scientist

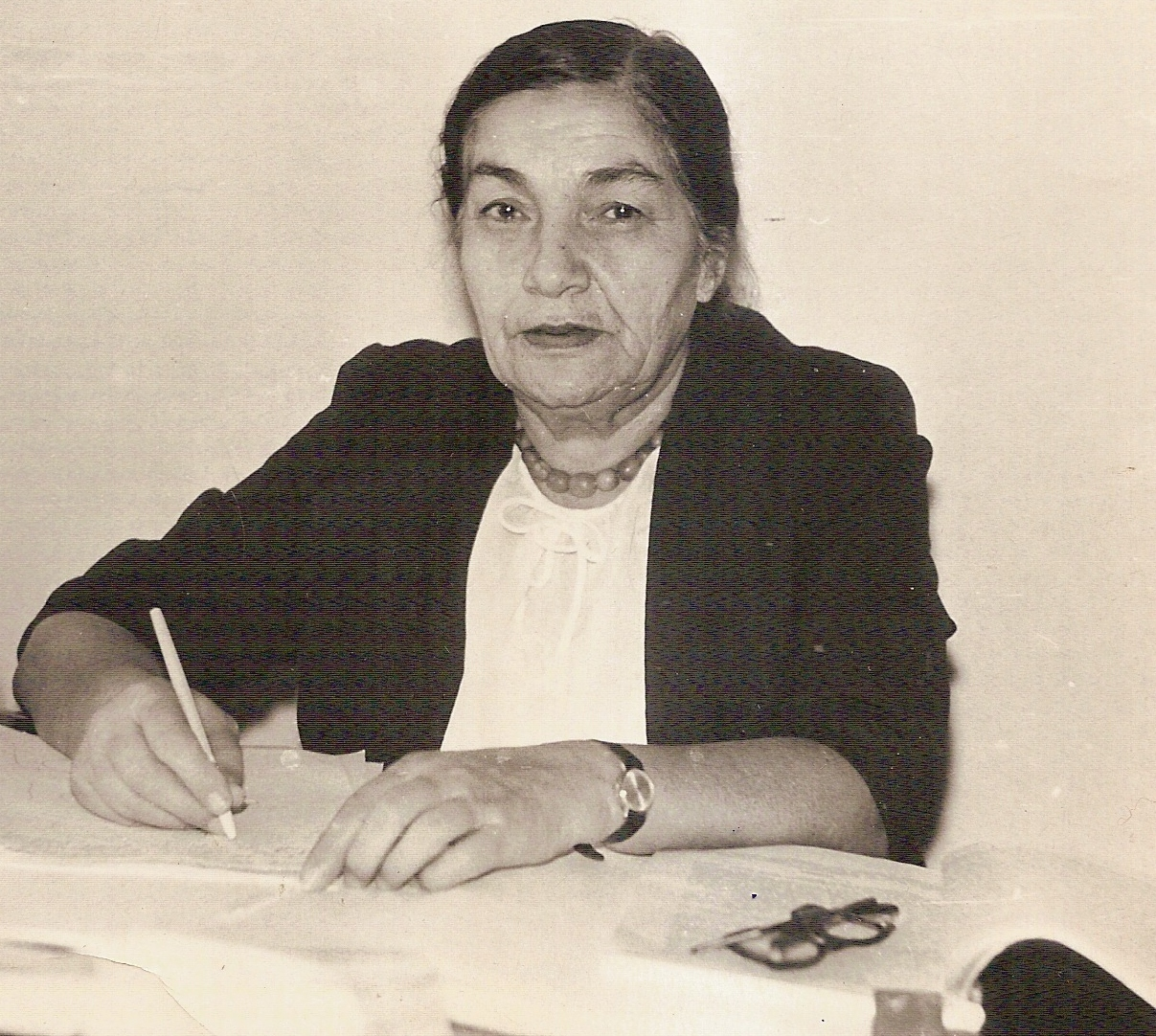
- Born: May 20, 1906; Murshudali Village, Russian Empire
- Died: July 25, 1989 (aged 83); Yerevan, Armenian SSR, USSR

Natalya Melik Melikyan (Armenian: Նատալյա Մելիքի Մելիքյան) (May 20, 1906 – July 25, 1989) was an Armenian scientist, Doctor of Biological Sciences, Professor, Honored Scientist of the Armenian SSR (7.03.1967).

== Biography ==
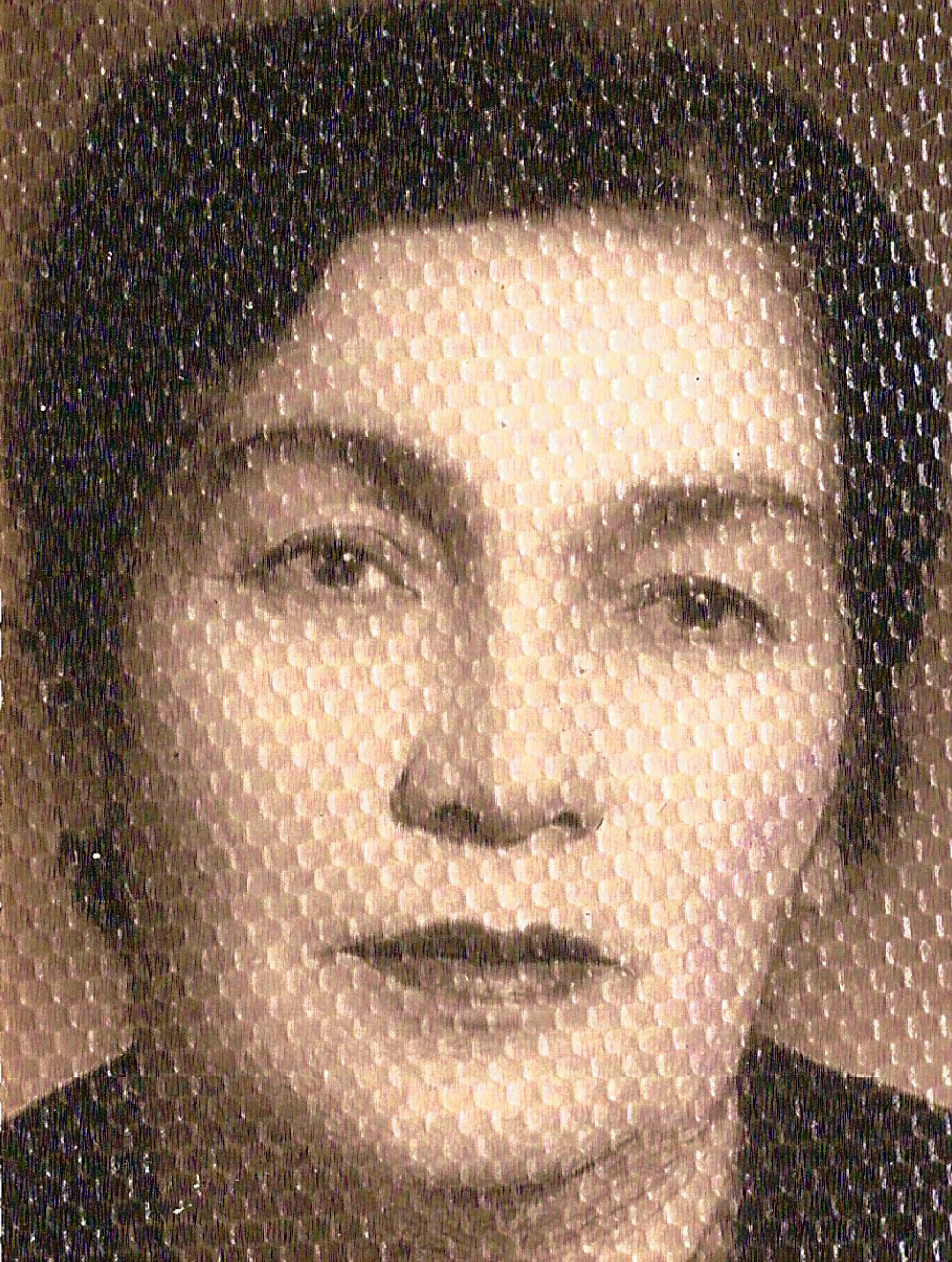

Natalya Melikyan (Ter-Meliksetyan) was born on May 20, 1906, in the Murshudali Armenian-populated village of the Surmalinsky Uyezd, Erivan Governorate of the Russian Empire. Her father was Melik Ter-Meliksetyan and her mother was Mariam Mkrtchian. Melikyan studied at Iğdır primary school for two years. In 1918, surviving the Armenian genocide, the Melikyan family found a refuge in Yerevan.

In 1926, Melikyan graduated from the Yerevan Secondary School N2 after Al. Myasnikyan, Yerevan and for two years worked as a teacher in the Hrazdan region. In 1928–1931, she studied in the Department of Biology of Yerevan State University. After graduation, she was admitted to the PhD program of the Plant Anatomy and Physiology Department of Moscow State University, where she conducted her research under the supervision of Dmitriy Sabinin in 1933.In 1931, Melikyan had married Barsegh Muradian, and they had two children.

She returned to Yerevan in 1934 and started working in the newly established Plant Anatomy and Physiology Department of Yerevan State University as teaching assistant, and afterwards as head of laboratory. In 1939, under the supervision of Professor S.D. Lvov, chair of the Plant Physiology department at Leningrad University, she defended her dissertation with the title "Survey on linseed oil in Armenia," and in 1940 she received the title of associate professor. During those years, in collaboration with biologist Alexander Araratyan, she studied oil-producing wild plants, aiming to put them in mass production. However, the Second World War interrupted the implementation of all of the projects. Her husband went to the war and died in May 1942.

Collaborating with Mikhail Chailakhyan, who arrived from Moscow, Melikyan studied the accumulation of lignin in plant stalks and its anatomical features. The results were summed up in her monograph "Structural changes in plants and lignin accumulation dynamics, depending on environmental conditions," published in 1959. In 1964, Melikyan defended her doctoral dissertation and in 1966 was awarded the academic title of professor.

In 1962–1977, Melikyan headed the Department of Plant Anatomy and Physiology of Yerevan State University, and, in 1977–1985, she was professor and counselor at the same department. In 1962–1982, she was the head of the "anatomical, physiological and biochemical characteristics of tuber-forming plants" scientific program conducted by the department.

Melikyan was awarded the Order of the Badge of Honour (1953) and received a number of medals and diplomas from the government. She also was awarded the title of Honored Scientist of the Armenian Soviet Socialist Republic (1967).

In 1989, Melikyan died at the age of 83 in Yerevan.

== Awards ==
- Order of the Badge of Honour
- Jubilee Medal "Thirty Years of Victory in the Great Patriotic War 1941–1945"
- Medal "Veteran of Labour"
- Jubilee Medal "In Commemoration of the 100th Anniversary of the Birth of Vladimir Ilyich Lenin"
