= Karen Manvelyan =

Armenian biologist and environmentalist

Karen Manvelyan (Armenian: Կարեն Մանվելյան) is an Armenian biologist and environmentalist who has worked in San Francisco as a scientist for much of his life. He is the current director of the World Wildlife Fund in Armenia.
