= Suren Ayvazyan =

Armenian geologist (1933–2009)

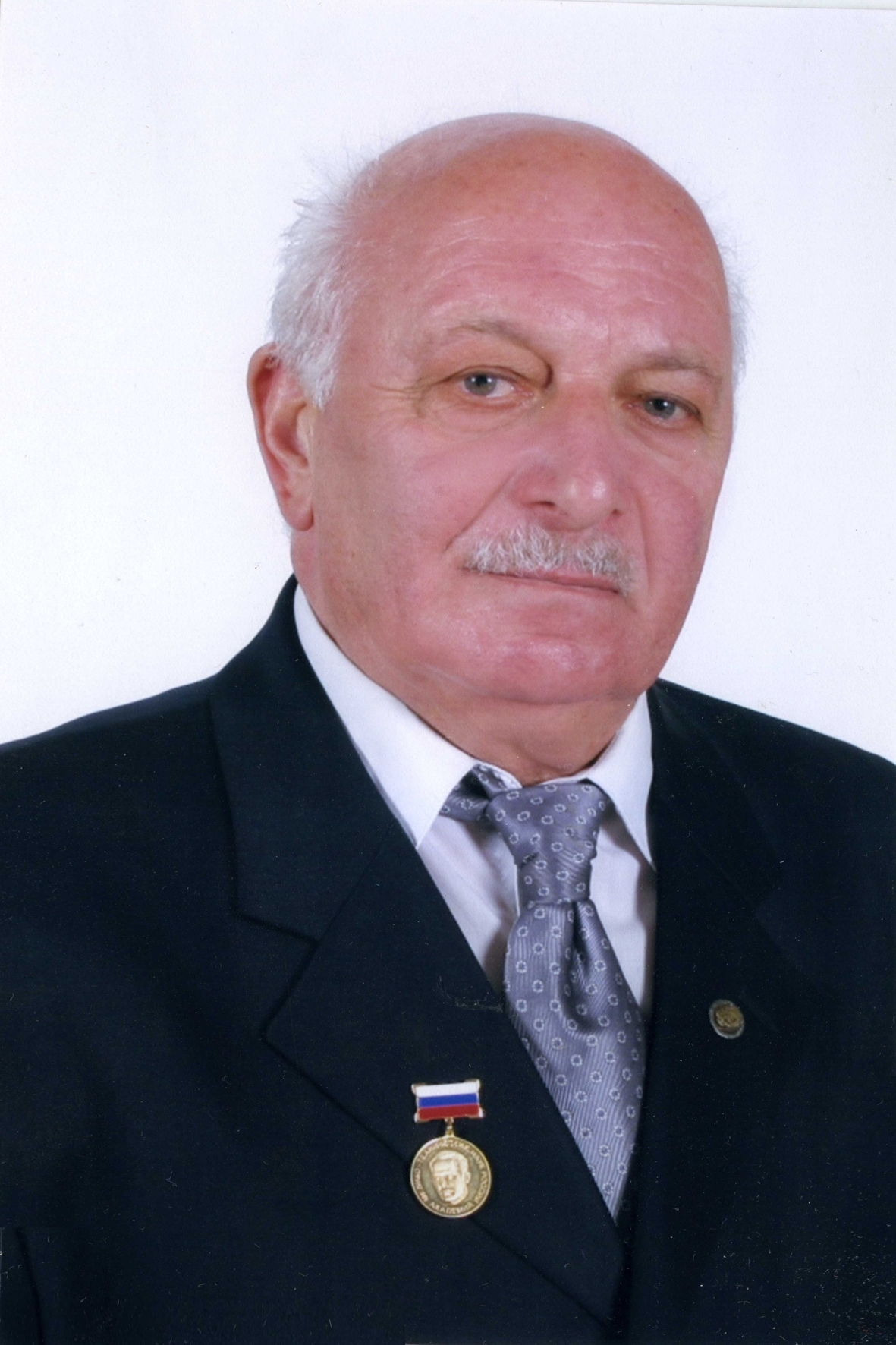
Suren M. Ayvazyan

Suren M. Ayvazyan (4 August 1933 – 11 September 2009) was an Armenian geologist and public figure. He is the author of several works on linguistics and the history of Armenia.

== Works on the history of Armenia ==
In 1960 Ayvazyan met Russian archaeologist Boris Piotrovsky, who participated in the excavations of the ancient Urartian city of Teishebaini. Ayvazyan discussed with Piotrovsky whether the mythological ancient Armenia described by Movses Khorenatsi was real. Boris Piotrovsky said to him, "As a geologist, you know that no natural process leaves no evidence. If, as you argue, Movses Khorenatsi's oldest Armenia is there, please show me an archaeological site in Armenia that confirms it."

Ayvazyan chose as example an ancient monument of the Bronze Age, Metsamor, and published a work to demonstrate its relationship with Armenia, where he made a false description of coins with alleged Hayasan characters. He ascribed them to the 19th century BC and provided his own 'translation'. After checking in the Department of Numismatics of the Historical Museum of Armenia in 1968, he found that these coins were issued by the Atabeg dynasty of Azerbaijan in the period 1133–1225).

In the same article, Ayvazyan described the Hayasian inscription found on the rocks of Metsamor, which, after inspection conducted in 1968 by Professor V. Krachkovsky, was thought to be symbols of the Thuluth Arabic alphabet of the 19th century. This falsification, however, found its way into some renowned scientific journals, including the Czechoslovak New Orient (B. Mkrtchian, "The Mystery of Metsamor," No. 3, VI, 1967) and Anatolian Studies(Volume XVIII, 1968), as well as into popular publications of Armenia: the newspaper Komsomolets (15 November 1968) and the magazine Garun (No. 1, 1969). In these publications Ayvazyan argues:

Finally, we found, together with a group of geologists Hayasian archaeological site Metsamor with its development Mining Metallurgy production and hieroglyphic writing system did not leave any doubt about the localization Hayasa within Ararat region of Armenia. Evidence of that is the Metsamor Hayasian (ie ancient), rather than any other monument of culture, are found here in the first Armenian hieroglyphic writing. Their decoding of the authors on the basis of correlation with the Armenian hieroglyphic marks, preserved in several medieval manuscripts of Matenadaran. It ceased to exist centenary misunderstanding – the concept of the state of Urartu.

Thus, Ayvazyan created a theory of the Armenian origins of Urartu, with the support of the abovementioned "evidence" of material culture and the discredited attempt at translating the Urartian cuneiform inscriptions into Armenian. As a matter of fact, Boris Piotrovsky noted that, by carrying out this work, Ayvazyan was unaware that he was replicating work done by A. Mordtmann in the 19th century, who tried to read the Urartian cuneiform inscriptions in Armenian. "a work that has been rejected by science long time ago."

Despite the disclosure of the falsification, Suren Ayvazyan continued publishing the results of his 'studies' in the popular press, and in books, both in Armenian and in Russian, from the 1980s to the late 2000s.

== Works on the history of Russia ==
Ayvazyan published a series of surprising assertions regarding the history of Russia. In particular, he argued that the birthplace of the Proto-Russian was the Armenian Highlands in the 11th millennium BC. He also argued that Armenian Smbat Bargatuni founded Kyiv, that the Christian churches of Kyiv and Novgorod were built by Armenian architects in the 10th to the 11th centuries, that the Armenians introduced Christianity to Russia, and that the real name of Yuri Dolgoruki was Gevorg Bagratuni.

These opinions, according to Ayvazyan, are related to the fact that Mount Small Ararat is formed like a female breast. The other name for this mountain Sys, in Russian, is short for the female breast. It is also related to the alleged (but not documented in the scientific literature) detection in the Armenian highlands of 'Slavic skulls', dated by Ayvazyan as the second millennium BC. However, a large part of his claims are based only on many linguistic parallels and archaeological research.

== Socio-political activities ==
In the years of the Soviet perestroika, Ayvazian was active in the Popular Front for Armenia, and signed a number of letters to Mikhail Gorbachev, then the head of the Soviet state, about the transfer of the Nagorno-Karabakh region to Armenia. In 2001 he wrote a letter to British Queen Elizabeth II to demand the return of Armenian treasures, consisting of the treasures of Cilicia, which according to some information Levon VI left in the possession of the English King Edward III (1327–1377).
