= Gagik Petrosyan =

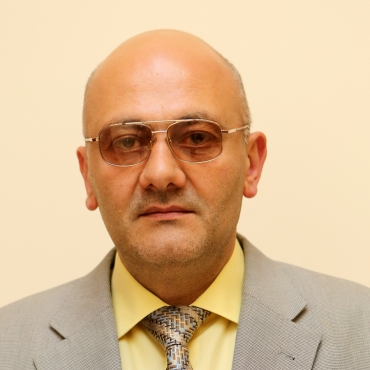
Petrosyan (2019)

Gagik R. Petrosyan (born 10 March 1973) is a state, public and political figure who previously worked in the Republic of Artsakh as deputy of the National Assembly.

== Biography ==
1. Born March 10, 1973 in Stepanakert
2. In 1989 he graduated from Russian school number 8 in Stepanakert.
3. In 1994, the Department of History and Philology of ASU.

Married, has two sons.

== Career ==
1. Since 1991, in the ranks of the NKR self-defense forces. He was a member of the <<Tseghakron>> group.
2. Since October 1992, Assistant to the Chief of Staff of the Central Defensive Region of the NKR Defense Army.
3. Since 1994, head of physical training of a training motorized rifle regiment
4. Since 1995, Head of the sports team of NKR JSC.
5. Since 1997, Head of the Sports Club of NKR JSC.
6. In 2000 elected deputy of the NKR National Assembly of the 3rd convocation in the 10 majoritarian district of Stepanakert
7. From 2000 to 2006 Deputy Chairman of the Standing Committee on Foreign Relations of the National Assembly of the NKR
8. In 2005, Member of the initiative group of the newly created party "Free Motherland".
9. In 2005, re-elected as a deputy of the NKR National Assembly of the 4th convocation in the same majority district of Stepanakert.
10. From October 2006 to 2010, Chairman of the NKR NA Standing Committee on Production and Production Infrastructures.
11. In 2007, he was a member of the initiative group for the nomination, and then the plenipotentiary representative of the NKR Presidential candidate Bako Sahakyan. Member of the Presidium of the political party "Free Motherland".
12. In 2010, re-elected as a deputy of the NKR National Assembly of the 5th convocation according to the proportional list of the Azat Ayrenik "Free Motherland" party.
13. Since 2010, Chairman of the <<Hayreniq>> faction of the NKR National Assembly, comprising 14 deputies.
14. In 2015, he was re-elected as a deputy of the NKR National Assembly of the 6th convocation according to the proportional list of the Azat Ayrenik "Free Motherland" party.
15. Participant in many international seminars, conferences, symposia on a wide range of political issues.
16. Author of many articles and publications on international security issues.

== Awards ==
Awarded the "Service in Battle" Medal (01.09.2006) and “Mkhitar Gosh“ medal (16.02.2018).
