= Gagik Shmavonyan =

Armenian professor of Microelectronics and Biomedical Devices (born 1963)

- Գագիկ Շմավոնյան
- Born: May 12, 1963 (age 63); Yerevan, Armenia
- Scientific career
- Fields: Nanotechnology, microelectronics
- Institutions: National Polytechnic University of Armenia
- Website: gagikshmavonyan.am

Gagik Shmavonyan (Armenian: Գագիկ Շմավոնյան; born May 12, 1963) is an Armenian physicist and engineer known for his work in nanotechnology, two-dimensional materials, and semiconductor devices. He is a professor at the National Polytechnic University of Armenia.

== Education and career ==
Shmavonyan received a PhD in physics in 1996 and a Doctor of Science (D.Sc.) degree in engineering in 2009 from the National Polytechnic University of Armenia. He has been a faculty member at the same institution, contributing to research and teaching in microelectronics and nanotechnology.

He has participated in international scientific conferences and professional organizations, including activities associated with the international society for optics and photonics (SPIE).

== Research ==
Shmavonyan's research focuses on nanostructured materials and semiconductor technologies, particularly two-dimensional materials such as graphene and related nanostructures. His work includes studies on nanostripes, hybrid nanostructures, and quantum-scale electronic devices.

He has also contributed to the development of methods for producing graphene-based materials and nanostructures.

== Publications and patents ==
Shmavonyan is an author and co-author of scientific publications in nanotechnology and materials science, including contributions to books and peer-reviewed journals. His work includes research on two-dimensional materials and devices.

He is also a co-inventor on patents related to graphene production methods.

== See also ==
- Nanotechnology
- Graphene
