= George Ter-Stepanian =

Armenian Soviet geologist, engineer-builder

- Armenian: Գեորգ Եսայու Տեր-Ստեփանյան
- Born: April 16 [O.S. April 3] 1907; Tiflis, Russian Empire (present-day Tbilisi, Georgia)
- Died: 4 December 2006 (aged 99); Montreal, Canada
- Citizenship: Russian Empire, Soviet Union, Armenia
- Education: Georgian Polytechnical Institute
- Known for: one of the founders of the landslide studies, and the originator of the theories of the depth creep of slopes, the structural composition of post-ice-age clay and suspension pressure acting against filtration
- Scientific career
- Fields: Geology, Engineering Geology, Geodesy, Geomechanics, Applied mathematics
- Workplaces: Armenian Academy of Sciences, Yerevan State University, Yerevan Polytechnical Institute

George Ter-Stepanian (Armenian: Գեորգ Եսայու Տեր-Ստեփանյան, Russian: Георгий Исаевич Тер-Степанян; April 16 [O.S. April 3] 1907 – December 4, 2006) was a Soviet Armenian scientist in the field of soil mechanics and engineering geology, one of the founders of the landslide studies, and the originator of the theories of the depth creep of slopes, the structural composition of post-ice-age clay and suspension pressure acting against filtration. Ter-Stepanian was a member of the National Academy of Sciences of Armenia.

== Life, education and career ==
Ter-Stepanian was born on April 16, 1907, in Tiflis (Tbilisi), Georgia. His father, Isaiah Zakharievich Ter-Stepanian, was a veterinary physician, whose ancestors moved from Ani, a city in Western Armenia (presently in Turkey), to Georgia in the 14th century. His mother, Lucy Harutyunovna Ter-Stepanian (née Harutyunian) was a teacher of Russian and Armenian languages.

Ter-Stepanian embarked on his scientific work in 1930 at the Transcaucasian Institute of Structures while still a student at the Georgian Polytechnical Institute. From 1932 to 1941 he worked at various research institutes in Leningrad (Saint-Petersburg) and held a teaching position at the Leningrad Civil Engineering Institute (1931–1937 and 1939–1941). His research activities focused on landslides and pile foundations of bridges, as well as on investigation of internal soil friction.

Even early in his career Ter-Stepanian's expertise and knowledge was highly sought after and he was asked to join Soviet teams abroad. From 1937 to 1939 he worked in Tehran, Tabriz and Isfahan (Iran) as a geotechnical engineer in charge of the construction of elevators and other major facilities. From 1946 to 1949 Ter-Stepanian worked in Germany representing Armenian Academy of Sciences.

Ter-Stepanian was known for his innovative and daring approach to solving problems. As a result, during WWII, Ter-Stepanian was appointed a Chief of the Transcaucasian Research Party, a group entrusted with making projections about the landslide activation in strategically important military zones between the Caspian and the Black Seas. He was responsible for implementing landslide prevention measures that would allow the uninterrupted passage of military trains along the Trans-Caucasian railroad.

After WWII, Ter-Stepanian decided to devote his expertise to the development of his homeland Armenia, and moved to Yerevan, the capital of the Republic. He was invited to work at the newly organized Armenian Academy of Sciences, where he founded and headed up the Department of the Engineering Geology and Hydrogeology. Later on, he reorganized the Department to form the Laboratory of Geomechanics, which he directed until 1994. Along with his scientific work, Ter-Stpeanian significantly contributed to Armenia's environmental protection.

In 1994, Ter-Stepanian moved to the United States, where he was granted permanent residency as a distinguished scientist. Ter-Stepanian continued his scientific work in the United States. He discovered an unknown force of nature, the Suspension Force, as well as the Method for the settling of suspensions with the use of seepage force and vibrations. This was an important finding for environmental protection.

Ter-Stepanian spoke several languages. Besides Armenian and Russian, he was fluent in English, French, German; he was also proficient in Persian and Georgian.

Ter-Stepanian spent his final years in the United States and in Canada. He died at age 99 on December 4, 2006, in Montreal, Canada.

=== Academic achievements ===
George Ter-Stepanian earned a diploma in civil engineering from the Georgian Polytechnical Institute, in 1931. At the same time, he studied in the English Department of the Institute of Foreign Languages. He defended his PhD dissertation in 1939 and his post-doctoral dissertation in 1956, both at the Leningrad Civil Engineering Institute, presently the Saint Petersburg State University of Architecture and Civil Engineering. In 1960, he earned the scientific rank of a professor. In 1977, Ter-Stepanian was elected a Corresponding Member of the National Academy of Sciences of Armenia, and in 1996 he became a Full Member of the same academy.

=== Outstanding scientific contributions ===
Ter-Stepanian's contributions to science are outstanding. He is the author of ten monographs and more than 300 scientific articles, 80 of which were published outside of the former USSR.

Ter-Stepanian was a holder of several patents valid in the USSR, including those for the creation of instruments and devices to study the physico-mechanical attributes of soils. He also held patents in Canada (1999) and USA (2001) for the above-mentioned method.

Ter-Stepanian was the founder and chief editor of the trilingual (Armenian, Russian, English) scientific journal «Problems of Geomechanics», which was published between 1967 and 1988 and received wide international recognition. Articles by major Soviet and international scientists appeared the journal, many translated by Ter-Stepanian himself.

In 1975 Ter-Stepanian founded and acted as a chief editor of another scientific journal – «Reports of the Geomechanics Laboratory», published in Russian.

Ter-Stepanian served as a member of the editorial board of the scientific journals «Géotechnique» (London), «Engineering Geology» (Moscow), «Studia geotechnica et mechanica» (Wrocław) and «Bulletin of the Academy of Sciences of the Armenian SSR, Earth Sciences» (Yerevan). He published in English and German more than 600 short essays of the selected works by Soviet scientists. For 20 years these essays appeared in the Cologne-based journal «Geotechnical Abstracts» of the German National Committee on Soil Mechanics and Foundation Engineering.

Several of Ter-Stepanian's works are fundamental and seminal in the field of soil mechanics and engineering geology, and they continue to be recognized globally. His expertise was internationally recognized and highly sought after, as evidenced by the frequent invitations both as a plenary and as a keynote speaker at international scientific forums, congresses, and universities across the world.

The most noteworthy was the invitation by Prof. Karl von Terzaghi, the father of Soil Mechanics, to present a paper to the First International Conference on Soil Mechanics and Foundation Engineering, as early as in 1936 at Cambridge, Massachusetts, which was followed by his subsequent participation in the London, Paris, Montreal, Mexico City, Moscow, Gdańsk, Tokyo, Stockholm, San Francisco congresses. He also contributed to early international and regional conferences on Rock mechanics in Lisbon and Belgrade, on Engineering Geology in New Delhi, Paris, San Paulo, Madrid, Lisbon, Athens, Vancouver and Landslides in Tokyo, Prague, New Delhi, Toronto, Lausanne, Kyoto, Trondheim. As a prominent specialist in the field of Soil Mechanics and Engineering Geology, he was invited frequently to give lectures in Belgium, Bulgaria, Czechoslovakia, France, Hungary, Japan, Norway, Poland, Sweden, and other countries.

=== Membership in scientific organizations ===
Ter-Stepanian was actively involved in various Soviet and international scientific organizations.

For several years, he was the president of the Commission on Landslides and a Member of the Seismic and Mud Flow Commission of the Scientific Committee on Engineering Geology and Hydrogeology of the Academy of Sciences of the USSR.

He was also a member of:

- The Scientific Council on Engineering Geology and Soil Science at the Department of Geosciences of the Academy of Sciences of the USSR.
- The International Society for Soil Mechanics and Foundation Engineering (ISSMFE) and its Terminological Commission.
- The International Association for Engineering Geology and the Environment (IAEG) and its Commission on Landslide and Mass Movements.
- The International Society for Rock Mechanics (ISRM) and its Terminological Commission on Terminology, Symbols, and Graphic Representation.
- The Joint bureau of the afore-mentioned three related international societies to compose the International Geotechnical Societies’ UNESCO Working Party on the World Landslide Inventory.

== Environmental protection ==
Ter-Stepanian's greatest contribution was to the preservation of nature and the environment in Armenia. In 1956 he voiced his opposition to the government's decision to make an extensive use of the water from Lake Sevan, a distinctive and unique high-mountain water source, for energy purposes. Using technical and economic projections, he demonstrated the error and the inexpediency of the project, warning that it would lead to the irreparable ruin of the lake. As a result of his intervention and, especially, his constant and decisive battles against the realisation of this venture, the project was reviewed and the Lake Sevan was saved.

In the late 1960s, Ter-Stepanian put up his opposition to the use of the Ararat Valley, a seismically active zone containing the only artesian water source in the region and located only 26 kilometers from Yerevan, the Republic's capital, as a building site for a new Nuclear power plant. He pointed out the hazardous and irreversible consequences of such a decision and proposed a safer, more appropriate site. Nevertheless, the project went ahead. However, when in the 1980s the construction of a radioactive dumpsite near the existing Armenian Nuclear Station located in the middle of the Ararat Valley was proposed, Ter-Stepanian launched a strong opposition, involving the voice and the expertise of world-renowned scientists and global organizations, and succeeded in averting the construction of the radioactive dumpsite.

His passion for the environmental protection inspired him to write a science-fiction novel with an intent to reach out to the general public to raise awareness of the vital importance and urgency of protecting the environment. Ter-Stepanian authored a science-fiction novel dedicated to the environmental protection titled Разумнее людей, published in Armenia in 1989 in Russian, and translated into English and published posthumously in Canada in 2008 under the title Wiser than Humans.

Ter-Stepanian's Memoirs that cover his century-long life are presently ready for publication (in Russian).

== Research ==
=== Suspension pressure acting against filtration ===
Ter-Stepanian is one of the founders of the study of landslides, and the originator of the theories of the depth creep of slopes, the structural composition of the post-ice-age clay and the Suspension Pressure Acting Against Filtration. He made major contributions to the fields of the engineering geology, soil mechanics and geomechanics, as well as to the introduction standardization and translation, of the scientific terminology. He also made a number of important discoveries in the fields of geology, rheology, geodesy, molecular physics and applied mathematics. Despite his substantial contributions to various geotechnical topics, he is best known in the West for his works on the creep and rheology of slopes and on the gravitational deformation of mountain slopes.

=== Soil mechanics ===
In the field of soil mechanics, Ter-Stepanian observed, as early as the 1930s, the phenomenon of the jump-like reorganization in the soil structure along faults. He was the first to establish the metastability of the structure of high-sensitivity late-glacial marine clays and to develop methods of studying them, which proved to be of a great economic importance.

=== Geomechanics ===
Ter-Stepanian was among the founders of the emerging science of Geomechanics, defining the key concepts and most importantly the objectives of this new field during its formative stage. He studied the geological and rheological preconditions that cause landslides and proposed the theory of the depth creep of slopes. The latter not only accounts for a number of slope phenomena, but facilitates the analysis of the landslide mechanism itself, allowing for prognoses to be made about the slope rupture and making the landslide prevention work possible.

=== Landslide prevention ===
Ter-Stepanian developed an economically expedient observational method for Landslide Prevention, which consists of regular implementation of anti-landslide measures while simultaneously conducting observations of slope dynamics. He also developed a detailed morphogenetic classification of landslide fissures and a classification of landslide deformations of buildings and other structures.

=== Geology ===
In the field of geology, as early as in 1958, Ter-Stepanian was the first to suggest that salt tectonics were present in Armenia. Discovered first in Yerevan, this was subsequently confirmed in his studies of the mechanism of landslide burial in the High Pliocene Epoch in the ravine of the Hrazdan River and in the Ararat Valley.

=== Geomorphology ===
In the field of Geomorphology, Ter-Stepanian isolated a new type of micro-relief in the form of accumulative ridges that are located along the entire length of slopes and related to the build-up of material along roads, balks and other obstacles.

=== Hydrogeology ===
In the field of Hydrogeology, he identified and described, types of hydrogeological cross-sections in canyons which cut through basalts and clays lying beneath them. He developed a piezometric method to carry out a field identification of the vertical total filtration pressure necessary to analyze the effective tension in the body of the landslide.

=== Engineering geology ===
In engineering geology, Ter-Stepanian studied the properties of soil foundations of the industrial, hydrotechnical and residential building sites on the territories of the former Soviet Union (Leningrad, Murmansk, Chita, Sochi, Yegorlyk, Armenia, Georgia, Volga River), and in Iran (Tabriz, Tehran, Isfahan, Mashhad). He developed an engineering geological map of the Soviet Republic of Armenia (M1:1 000 000). He also made a landmark discovery for the foundation engineering: a type of a deposit accumulation formed in silty loams of foothill zones, which is characterized by lack of subsidence, the degradation of which occurs as a result of moistening by precipitation or temporary water flows during the accumulation process.

=== Engineering geodesy ===
In the field of engineering geodesy, Ter-Stepanian developed a graphical differential method for measuring landslide displacements based on the use of the nomogram. The results are summarized in his monograph Geodetic Methods for Investigating the Dynamics of Landslides, which was published in two editions in Russian (Moscow, 1972 and 1979) and in German (Leipzig, 1976).

=== Molecular physics ===
In the field of molecular physics, Ter-Stepanian researched the conditions of the equilibrium of capillary systems, isolating the mechanisms of capillary-balanced fluids that are similar in external appearance, but behave differently. He has also discovered a unique landslide mechanism caused by capillary siphoning, by which water partly moves upward (to the surface) in the form of steam.

=== Applied mathematics ===
In the field of applied mathematics, he proposed a theory of chain nomograms with rectilinear scales, based on the application of new concepts — namely, the coefficient of scale and the dimensionless parameter of transformation. These allow to calculate algorithms and to compose rational nomograms for the functions of many variables. He then included the results in the monograph Engineering Chain Nomograms with Rectilinear Scales, published in Yerevan in 1965. On the basis of the theory of nomograms, he developed a method of projecting the anamorphosis of experimental curves to generate empirical formulas, which allows the parameters of equations of rational-linear functions to be determined by grapho-analytical methods.

=== Soil rheology ===
In the field of soil rheology, Ter-Stepanian proposed a structural theory of the depth creep of slopes that was confirmed by nearly six years of extensive experimental research. He described a field method, by which the rheological attributes of soils based on the observation of the depth creep of slopes, could be defined.

=== Filtration pressure ===
Ter-Stepanian provided explanations for many natural phenomena previously undetected or misunderstood. These include establishing an avalanche mechanism for the hydrodynamic mud flow, according to which the enigmatic behavior of mud flow (for instance, their ability to carry large boulders afloat, elevated clearly above the surface) can be explained by the impact of Filtration Pressure. He studied the particularities of the mechanisms of earthen streams and developed a method for drawing hodographs of the depth creep of slopes. He identified the causes for, and proposed a way to prevent the destruction of inselbergs, explaining that this phenomenon was due to changes in temperature.

=== Technogene ===
In 1984, Ter-Stepanian formulated the notion of the Technogene – a new geological epoch that has resulted from the influence of human activity. This idea was developed in his monograph entitled Beginning of the Quinary, or the Technogene: Engineering-geological Analysis (Yerevan, 1985), and was also presented at several congresses and in scientific papers.

=== Technical terms, symbols and definitions ===
Ter-Stepanian compiled the Russian section of the eight-language Dictionary of Soil Mechanics and Foundation Engineering – Technical Terms, Symbols and Definitions (Zürich, 1967; Toronto, 1981), published a dictionary of international symbols for soil mechanics and engineering geology in Russian and Armenian, and collaborated in the specification of the international terminology for rock mechanics in English, French and German. In 1978 he completed a trilingual (English, Russian, Armenian) dictionary of geological and geotechnical terms and definitions, unique in its kind, which regrettably was not published.

In the early 1990s, he also authored a manuscript Early Diagnostics and Treatment of Landslides, which was commissioned by A.A. Balkema Rotterdam Brookfield but sadly for the scientific community, it was not published. An online publication is presently under way.

== List of works ==
=== Selected scientific books ===
- Тер-Степанян Г.И. Начало пятеричного периода или техногена. Инженерно-геологический анализ. [Beginning of the Quinary or the Technogene. Engineering-Geological Analysis]. Yerevan: Armenian Academy of Sciences Press, 1985, 100 p.
- Тер-Степанян Г.И. Современные методы прогноза оползневого процесса. Москва: Наука. [Contemporary Methods of Prognosis of the Landslide Process]. Moscow: Hauka Press, 1981, 120 p.
- Тер-Степанян Г.И. Геодезические методы изучения динамики оползней. [Geodetic Methods for Investigation of the Dynamic of Landslides]. Moscow: Nedra Press, 1979, 157 p. 2nd Edition.
- Тер-Степанян Г.И. Новые методы изучения оползней. [New Methods of Landslide Study].Yerevan: Armenian Academy of Sciences Press, 1978, 152 p.
- Ter-Stepanian, George. Geodätische Methoden zur Unteruchung der Dynamik von Rutschungen. [Geodetic Methods for Investigation of the Dynamic of Landslides]. Leipzig: VEB Deutscher Verlag für Grundstoffindustrie, 1976, 202 p.
- Тер-Степанян Г.И. Геодезические методы изучения динамики оползней. [Geodetic Methods for Investigation of the Dynamic of Landslides]. Moscow: Nedra Press, 1972, 135 p. 1st Edition.
- Тер-Степанян Г.И. Инженерные цепные номограммы с прямолинейными шкалами (теория, расчет, построение). [Engineering Chain Nomograms with Straight Scales (theory, computation, construction)]. Yerevan: Armenian Academy of Sciences Press, 1965, 272 p.
- Тер-Степанян Г.И. О длительной устойчивости склонов. [On Long-Term Stability of Slopes]. Yerevan: Armenian Academy of Sciences Press, 1961, 42 p.

=== Science-fiction work ===
- Ter-Stepanian, George. Wiser than Humans. Translation from Russian. Montreal: Editions Antaeus, 2008, 325 p.
- Тер-Степанян, Георгий. Разумнее людей. [Wiser than Humans]. Ереван: Hayastan Press, 1989, 222 p.

=== Linguistic contributions to multilingual dictionaries ===
- Lexicon in 8 Languages: English, French, German, Italian, Portuguese, Russian, Spanish, and Swedish. Russian section. International Society for Soil Mechanics and Foundation Engineering (ISSMFE). Toronto: Byant Press Ltd., 5th Edition, 1981, 245 p.
- Terminology (English, French, German). Commission on Terminology, Symbols and Graphic Representation. International Society for Rock Mechanics (ISRM), Lisbon, 1975, 83 p.
- Technical Terms, Symbols and Definitions in English, French, German, Swedish, Portuguese, Spanish, Italian, and Russian used in Soil Mechanics and Foundation Engineering. Russian section. International Society for Soil Mechanics and Foundation Engineering. Zürich, 1967, 3rd Edition, 183 p.

=== Patents ===
- Ter-Stepanian G. Method for Settling of Suspensions with Use of Seepage Force and Vibrations, US Patent US RE37,733 E, reissued June 11, 2002.
- Ter-Stepanian G. Méthode de décantation des suspensions utilisant la force d’écoulement et les vibrations. [Method for Settling of Suspensions with Use of Seepage Force and Vibrations]. Brevet Canadien 2,228,072 émis le 7 décembre 1999.

=== Publishing and editorial work ===
- Problems of Geomechanics (1966–1988): Ter-Stepanian George, a founder and editor-in-chief with participation of the international advisory board of the trilingual (Armenian, Russian, English) scientific journal.
  - Five volumes have been published annually (1967 – No. 1), (1968 – No. 2), (1969 – No. 3), (1970 – No. 4), (1971 – No. 5).
  - Five volumes have been published periodically (1973 – No. 6), (1976 – No.7), (1982 – No. 8), (1984 – No. 9), (1988 – No. 10).
- Reports of the Geomechanics Laboratory (1975–1985): Ter-Stepanian George, a founder and editor-in-chief of the scientific journal in Russian. Five volumes had been issued between 1975 and 1985.

=== Selected translations ===
- Pierre Habib. Production of gaseous pore pressure during rock slides. [Абиб П., Образование газового порового давления во время скальных оползней]. Translation from English by George Ter-Stepanian. Problems of Geomechanics, Yerevan: Armenian Academy of Sciences Press, 1982, No. 8, pp. 23–29.
- Jan Rybar, Otakar Vrba. Examples of loosening of rock slopes in the Bohemian Massive. [Рыбарж Я., Вржба О., Примеры ослабления скальных склонов в Богемском массиве]. Translation from English by George Ter-Stepanian. Problems of Geomechanics, Yerevan: Armenian Academy of Sciences Press, 1982, No. 8, pp. 104–106
- Quido Zaruba. Slope deformations on the margin of the cretaceous plateau in Prague. [Заруба К., Деформации склонов на краю мелового плато в Праге]. Abbreviated translation from English by George Ter-Stepanian. Problems of Geomechanics, Yerevan: Armenian Academy of Sciences Press, 1976, No. 7, pp. 15–17.
- Laurints Bjerrum. Progressive failure of slopes in over-consolidated plastic clays and clay shales. [Бьеррум Л., Прогрессирующее разрушение склонов в переконсолидированных пластичных глинах и глинистых сланцах]. Translation from English by George Ter-Stepanian. Problems of Geomechanics, Yerevan: Armenian Academy of Sciences Press, 1976, No. 7, pp. 50–98.
- Waïk Ter-Minassian., Reinforced earth as material for a new type of composite dames. [Тер-Минасян В., Армированная земля как материал для нового типа составных плотин]. Translation from English by George Ter-Stepanian. Problems of Geomechanics, Yerevan: Armenian Academy of Sciences Press, 1976, No. 7, pp. 119–123.
- Karl Terzaghi., Past and future of applied soil mechanics. [Терцаги К., Прошлое и будущее прикладной механики грунтов]. Translation from English by George Ter-Stepanian. Problems of Geomechanics. Yerevan: Armenian Academy of Sciences Press, 1973, No. 6, pp. 1–25.
- Russian translations of Prof. Karl Terzaghi's works. [Русские переводы работ проф. Карла Терцаги]. Translation from English by George Ter-Stepanian. Problems of Geomechanics, Yerevan: Armenian Academy of Sciences Press, 1973, No. 6, pp. 26–28.
- Ralph B. Peck. Advantages and Limitations of the Observational Method in Applied Soil Mechanics. [Пек Р.B., Преимущества и ограничения обсервационного метода в прикладной механике грунтов]. Translation from English by George Ter-Stepanian. Problems of Geomechanics. Yerevan: Armenian Academy of Sciences Press, 1971, No. 5, pp. 30–57.
- Alec W. Skempton. Long-term stability of clay slopes. [Скемптон А.В., Длительная устойчивость глинистых склонов]. Translation from English by George Ter-Stepanian. Problems of Geomechanics. Yerevan: Armenian Academy of Sciences Press, 1967, No. 1, pp. 91–146.
- Alain W. Bishop, David J. Henkel. Тhe measurement of soil properties in triaxial test. [Бишоп A.У, Хенкель Д.Дж., Определение свойств грунтов в трехосных испытаниях]. Translation from English by George Ter-Stepanian. M.: Stroyizdat, 1961, 231 p.
