= Nikolay Enikolopov =

Armenian-Russian scientist

Nikolay Sergeyevich Enikolopov (Enikolopyan) (Russian: Николай Сергеевич Ениколопов (Ениколопян); March 13, 1924, Stepanakert – January 22, 1993, Berlin) was an Armenian-Russian scientist, Doctor of Chemistry, professor, academic of Russian Academy of Sciences, director of the Institute of Synthetic polymers (Currently Nikolay Enikolopov Institute of Synthetic Polymers) of the Russian Academy of Sciences. In 1980 he was awarded by the Lenin Prize.

In 1945 Enikolopov graduated from the Yerevan Polytechnic Institute. Since 1946 he worked at the Moscow Institute of Chemical Physics of the Russian Academy of Sciences, headed the laboratory of polymers. In 1982-1993 he headed also a department at the Moscow Institute of Physics and Technology.

On January 22, 1993, he died in Heidelberg, Germany. He was buried at Novodevichy Cemetery in Moscow. In 1998, by Resolution No. 235 of the Presidium of the Russian Academy of Sciences dated June 16, 1998, the Institute was named after Academician Enikolopov.
