= List of Armenian inventors and discoverers =

The following list contains notable inventions and discoveries made by ethnic Armenians, including those not born or living in modern-day Armenia and those of partial Armenian ancestry.

== List ==
Default sorted chronologically

Name	Country/citizenship	Field	Invention/discovery (date)
Mesrop Mashtots	Kingdom of Armenia	Linguistics	Armenian alphabet (c. 405); Georgian alphabet (c. 408; disputed); Caucasian Albanian alphabet (c. 422)
Cyrill Demian	Austrian Empire	Music	Accordion (1829)
Ignacy Łukasiewicz	Austrian Poland	Engineering, chemical	the first kerosene lamp (1853) the first oil refinery (1856)
Hovannes Adamian	Russian Empire, Soviet Union	Engineering	a pioneer of color television, patenting and demonstrating early electromechanical color TV systems (1907—1925)
Gabriel Kazanjian	United States	Engineering, electrical	Hand-held hair dryer (1911)
Stephen Stepanian	United States	Engineering, industrial	Concrete mixer truck (1916)
Emil Artin	Austria-Hungary, Austria, Germany, United States	Mathematics	Artin L-function (1923)
Semyon Kirlian	Soviet Union	Photography	Kirlian photography (1939)
Artem Mikoyan	Soviet Union	Engineering, aerospace	Mikoyan-Gurevich MiG-9, the first Soviet turbo jet fighter (1946)
Victor Ambartsumian	Soviet Union, Armenia	Astronomy	Stellar association (1947)
Cyrus Melikian	United States	Engineering, electrical	Coffee vending machine (1947; with Lloyd Rudd)
Sergey Mergelyan	Soviet Union	Mathematics	Mergelyan's theorem (1951)
Edward Keonjian	United States	Engineering, electrical	First solar-powered, pocket-sized radio transmitter (1954)
Sarkis Acopian	United States	Engineering, electrical	Solar-powered radio (1957)
Luther Simjian	United States	Engineering, electrical	Prototype of automated teller machine (ATM) (1960)
Benjamin Markarian	Soviet Union	Astronomy	Markarian's Chain (1961); Markarian galaxies (1965–80)
Gurgen Askaryan	Soviet Union	Physics, particle	Askaryan effect (1962)
Michael Artin	United States	Mathematics	Artin approximation theorem (1969)
Alexander Kemurdzhian	Soviet Union	Engineering, aerospace	First planetary rover, Lunokhod 1 (1970)
Michel Ter-Pogossian	United States	Medicine	Positron emission tomography (PET) (1974)
Suren Arakelov	Soviet Union	Mathematics	Arakelov theory (1974)
Raymond Damadian	United States	Medicine	Magnetic resonance imaging (MRI) (1977) (disputed with Paul Lauterbur)
Leonid Khachiyan	Soviet Union, United States	Mathematics	Ellipsoid method (1979)
George Adomian	United States	Mathematics	Adomian decomposition method (1980s)
Levon Chailakhyan	Soviet Union	Biophysics	the first cloned mammal from an early embryonic cell (1987)
Albert Kapikian	United States	Medicine	Rotavirus vaccine (1997)
Yuri Oganessian	Soviet Union, Russia	Physics, nuclear	Discovery of superheavy elements: Flerovium (1999), Livermorium (2000), Oganesson (2002), Moscovium (2003), Nihonium (2004), Tennessine (2009)

== See also ==
- List of Armenians
- List of Armenian scientists
- List of Armenian Nobel laureates
