= Alexander Kemurdzhian =

Soviet aerospace engineer

- Александр Кемурджиан; Ալեքսանդր Քեմուրջյան
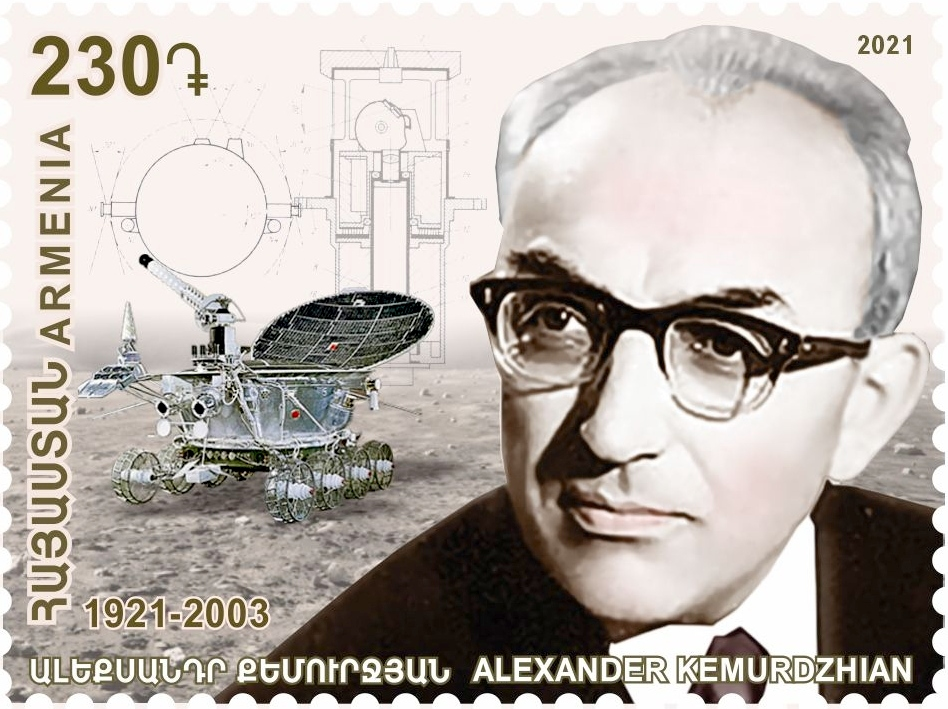
- Kemurdzhian on a 2021 post stamp of Armenia
- Born: October 4, 1921; Vladikavkaz, Mountain ASSR, Soviet Russia
- Died: February 25, 2003 (aged 81); Saint Petersburg, Russia
- Citizenship: Soviet Union; Russia
- Education: Moscow Bauman Higher Technical College
- Known for: Chief designer of Lunokhod 1, the first space exploration rover
- Scientific career
- Fields: Engineering (automotive)
- Workplaces: VNII-100 (VNIITransmash)

Aleksandr Leonovich Kemurdzhian (Note: Also spelled Kemurdjian, Kemurjyan.) (Russian: Александр Леонович Кемурджиан; 4 October 1921 – 25 February 2003) was a Soviet mechanical engineer who worked at the VNIITransmash institute for most of the second half of the 20th century. He is best known for designing the metal chassis for Lunokhod 1—the first ever planetary rover for space exploration in the Soviet space program.

== Early life ==
Kemurdzhian was born to Armenian parents on 4 October 1921 in Vladikavkaz, today the capital of North Ossetia. His father (b. 1898) and mother (b. 1901) were volunteers in the Russian Civil War with the 11th Red Army who happened to be in Vladikavkaz at the time of his birth. His paternal grandparents were from Trebizond who settled in Batumi in the late 19th century, while his mother was from Rostov-on-Don. He was raised in Baku, which he considered his hometown.

In 1940 he enrolled at the Bauman Higher Technical College in Moscow. With the start of the Eastern Front of World War II in 1941, he and other students of the tank department were assigned to repair damaged tanks until the institute was evacuated to Izhevsk. In early 1942 he volunteered to join the Soviet Army. Served in the 162nd Infantry Division of the NKVD, he participated in the battles of Kursk, the Dnieper, and the Vistula–Oder Offensive. He rose to the rank of senior lieutenant by the time he was demobilized in 1946. For his services, he was awarded the Order of Courage, Order of the Red Star (1944), Order of the Patriotic War (1945, 1995), Order of the Badge of Honour, and the Medal "For Battle Merit".

Due to the disruption caused by the war, Kemurdzhian graduated from the department of tracked vehicles of the Bauman Higher Technical College in 1951, some 11 years after enrolling.

== Career ==
In 1951, Kemurdzhian began working at the Leningrad-based All-Union Scientific-Research Institute No. 100 (VNII-100, now known as VNIITransmash), whose "primary expertise was building tanks for the Soviet Army." Kemurdzhian's research focused on continuously variable transmission in tracked vehicles. In 1953, he published his first scientific paper, on developing high-temperature cooling systems for engines. In total, Kemurdzhian authored 200 scientific publications (mostly papers, some six monographs) and patented 50 inventions.

He defended his Candidate of Sciences thesis, on the continuously variable transmissions for artillery tractors, in 1957. From 1959, he led research on air-cushion vehicles (hovercraft).

=== Work on lunar rovers ===
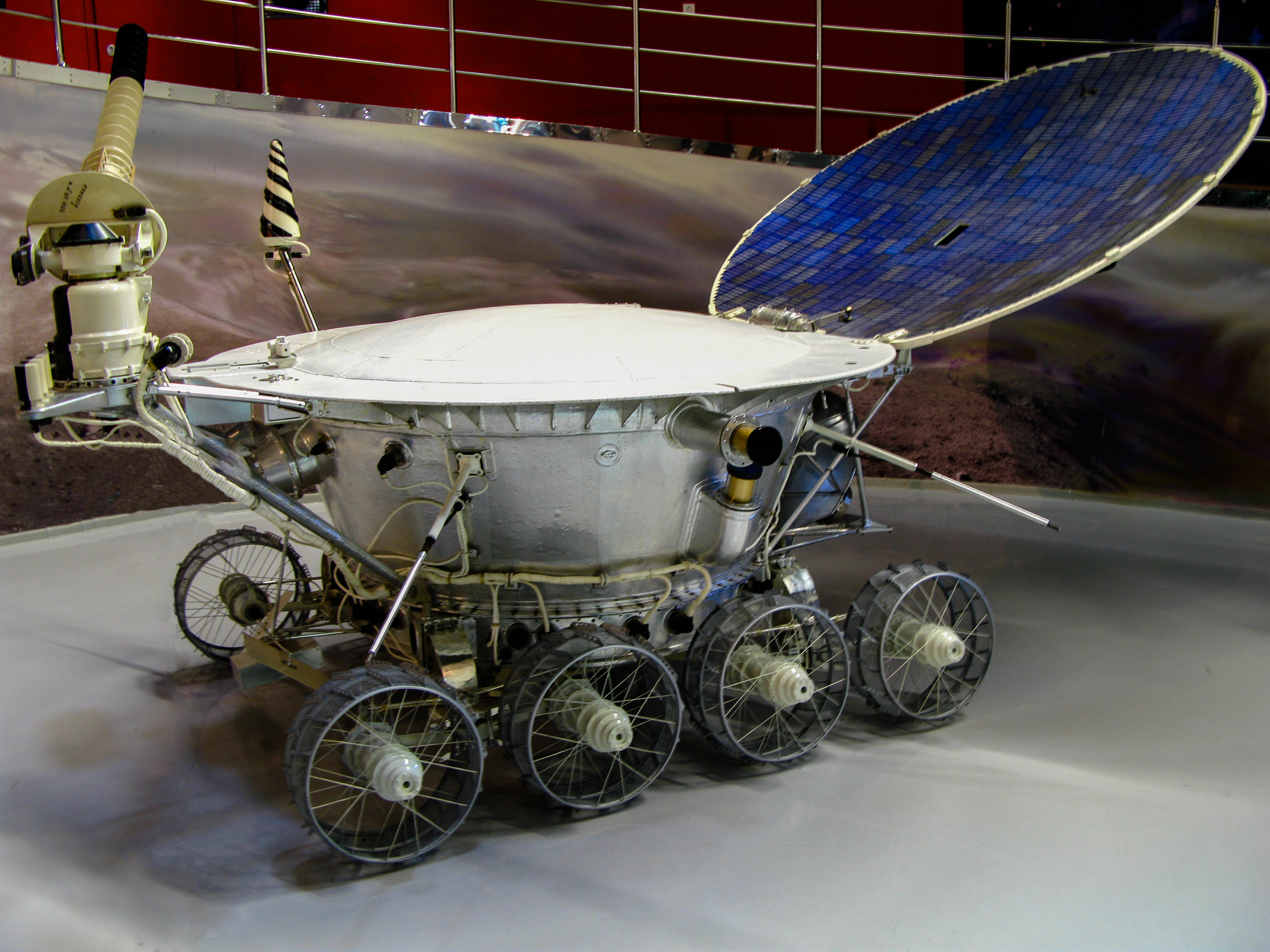
Model of a Lunokhod rover

Between 1963 and 1973, Kemurdzhian headed the team assigned to develop the self-propelled chassis for the Lunokhod programme. His team designed both Lunokhod 1 (1970) and Lunokhod 2 (1973). In 1969 he was named deputy director and chief designer at VNIITransmash. Under his leadership, the institute became a leader of space transport engineering. In 1971 he became Doctor of Technical Sciences after defending his dissertation at the Institute of Mechanical Engineering of the Soviet Academy of Sciences, based on his work on Lunokhod 1 and 2. He was named professor in 1977.

Kemurdzhian was personally interested in spaceflight and "remote-controlled space probes," which was known to Sergei Korolev. In September 1963 Korolev met with VNIITransmash engineers to discuss the possibilities of developing lunar rovers. The design sketches for the first lunar rover were completed by September 1965. Kemurdzhian provided the main report on the possibility of creating the lunar rover. Georgy Babakin, director of OKB Lavochkin, and Kemurdzhian worked closely to design the Ye-8 in 1966. In 1967 a final lunar rover design was reached and a prototype was constructed. Early models were sent to the moon on Luna 11, Luna 12 (1966) and Luna 14 (1968). Lunokhod 1, the finalized version, was designed by Kemurdzhian and Babakin. Kemurdzhian is credited with being the chief designer of the self-propelled chassis of Lunokhod-1.

Lunokhod 1 was carried to the moon by Luna 17, which was launched on 10 November and landed on the moon on 17 November 1970. It was the "first successful rover to operate beyond Earth" and the "first self-propelled, crewless vehicle to operate on the moon." It weighed 756 kg (1,667 lb) and was 4.42 m (14.5 ft) long and 1.92 m (6 ft 4 in) high. It carried cameras, transmitters and scientific instruments. The remote-controlled robot traveled some 10.54 km (6.55 mi) in 10 months and sent back some 20,000 photos and 200 panoramas. It also completed over 500 lunar soil tests.

=== Work on Mars lander vehicle ===
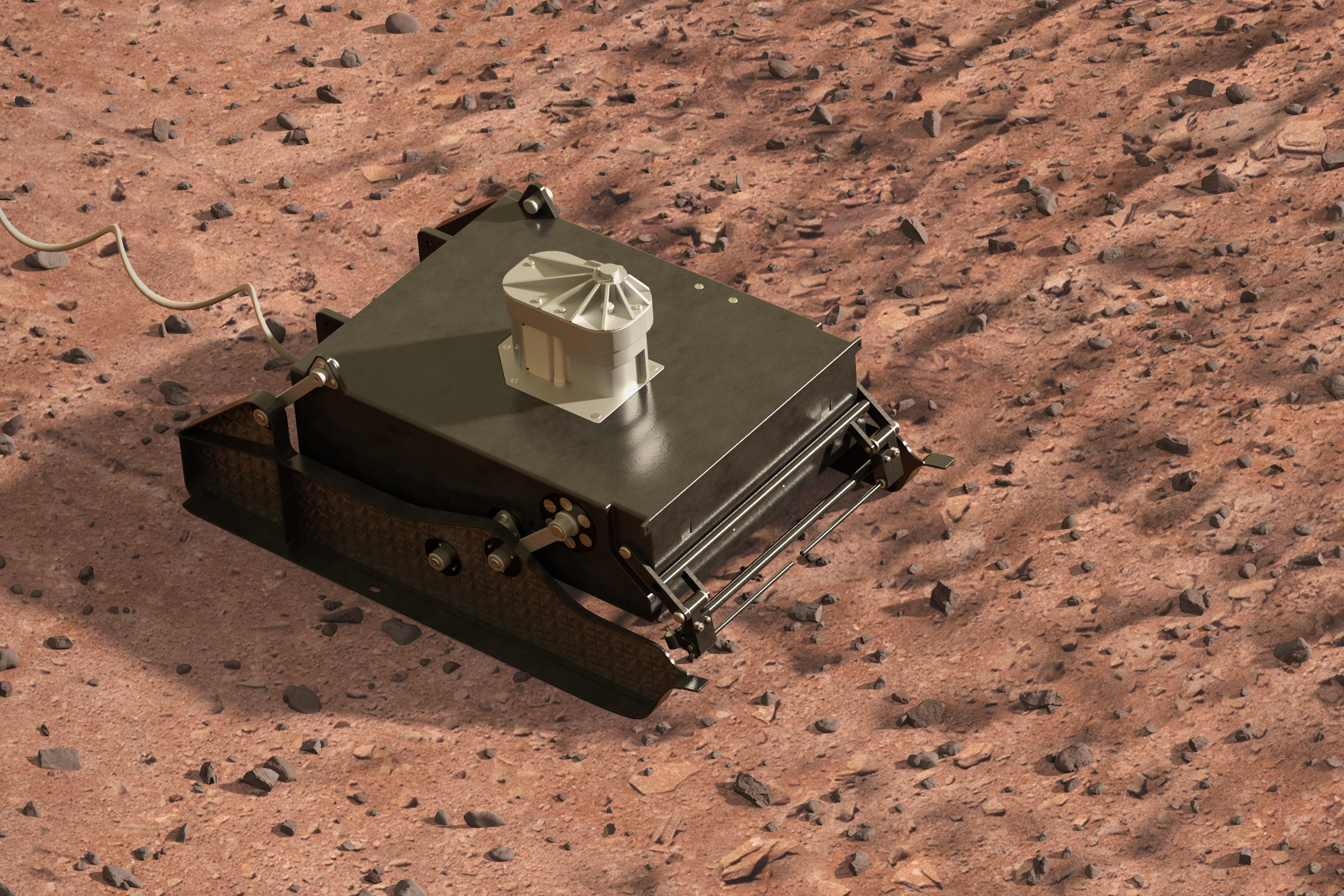
Rendering of the PrOP-M

The M71 landers—Mars 2 and Mars 3—which were launched in 1971, both carried a small walking robot called PrOP-M (ПрОП-М, Pribor otsenki prokhodimosti – Mars, "Passability Estimating Vehicle for Mars") developed by Kemurdzian at VNIITransmash.

== Later years and death ==
In May 1986 Kemurdzhian led a team of researchers to develop the robot STR-1 (СТР-1) in response to the Chernobyl disaster. Goal was to support the Chernobyl liquidators to investigate and clean up the area. In Chernobyl he was exposed to excessive radiation and was treated in a Moscow hospital for radiation burns.

Kemurdzhian transitioned from institute's deputy director to chief scientific officer in 1991, and retired in 1998. In 2000 he became a founding member of the St. Petersburg Branch of the Russian Academy of Cosmonautics (StPB RAC). In November 2000 he was the chief speaker at the 30th anniversary of the Lunokhod meeting held at the Tovstonogov Bolshoi Drama Theater. His last public appearance took place in mid-January 2003. A few days later he suffered a hip fracture and was hospitalized. He died in Saint Peteresburg on 24 or 25 February, 2003. He was buried at the Smolensky Armenian cemetery in St. Petersburg.

He was married to a Latvian architect and had a son, Vladimir, who headed a lab at VNIITransmash as of the late 1990s.

== Recognition ==
Kemurdzhian is recognized as the "founder of the Russian school of design of planetary rovers." For his work on lunar rovers, Kemurdzhian received the Lenin Prize in 1973. A minor planet discovered on 26 August 1976 by Nikolai Chernykh at the Crimean Astrophysical Observatory was named 5933 Kemurdzhian. He was a member of The Planetary Society, a corresponding member of the Committee on Space Research, the European Geosciences Union, and other learned societies. Documents, photos, and other archival materials on Kemurdzhian are kept at the Russian State Archive of Scientific-Technical Documentation.

Malenkov described him as follows: "A sharp mind, quick wit, and immediate response in all, including unexpected, situations; professionalism, encyclopedic erudition, commitment and hard work, multiplied by boundless energy; natural qualities of a leader of any assembly of people or experts, gathered by chance or by virtue of production relations; a charming conversationalist, a poet, and a great storyteller..."

In October 2021 the 100th anniversary of Kemurdzhian's birth was commemorated in Armenia with a conference and a postage stamp.

== See also ==
- List of Russian inventors
- List of Armenian inventors and discoverers

== Bibliography ==
- Siddiqi, Asif A. (2000). Challenge to Apollo: The Soviet Union and the Space Race, 1945–1974 (PDF). Washington, DC: NASA History Division.
- Harvey, Brian (2007). Soviet and Russian Lunar Exploration. Springer Science & Business Media. ISBN 9780387739762.
