= Adomian =

Adomian is a surname. Notable people with the surname include:

- George Adomian (1922–1996), American mathematician
  - Adomian decomposition method for solving differential equations
- James Adomian (born 1980), American actor and comedian
