= PrOP-M =

Soviet Mars rover launched in 1971

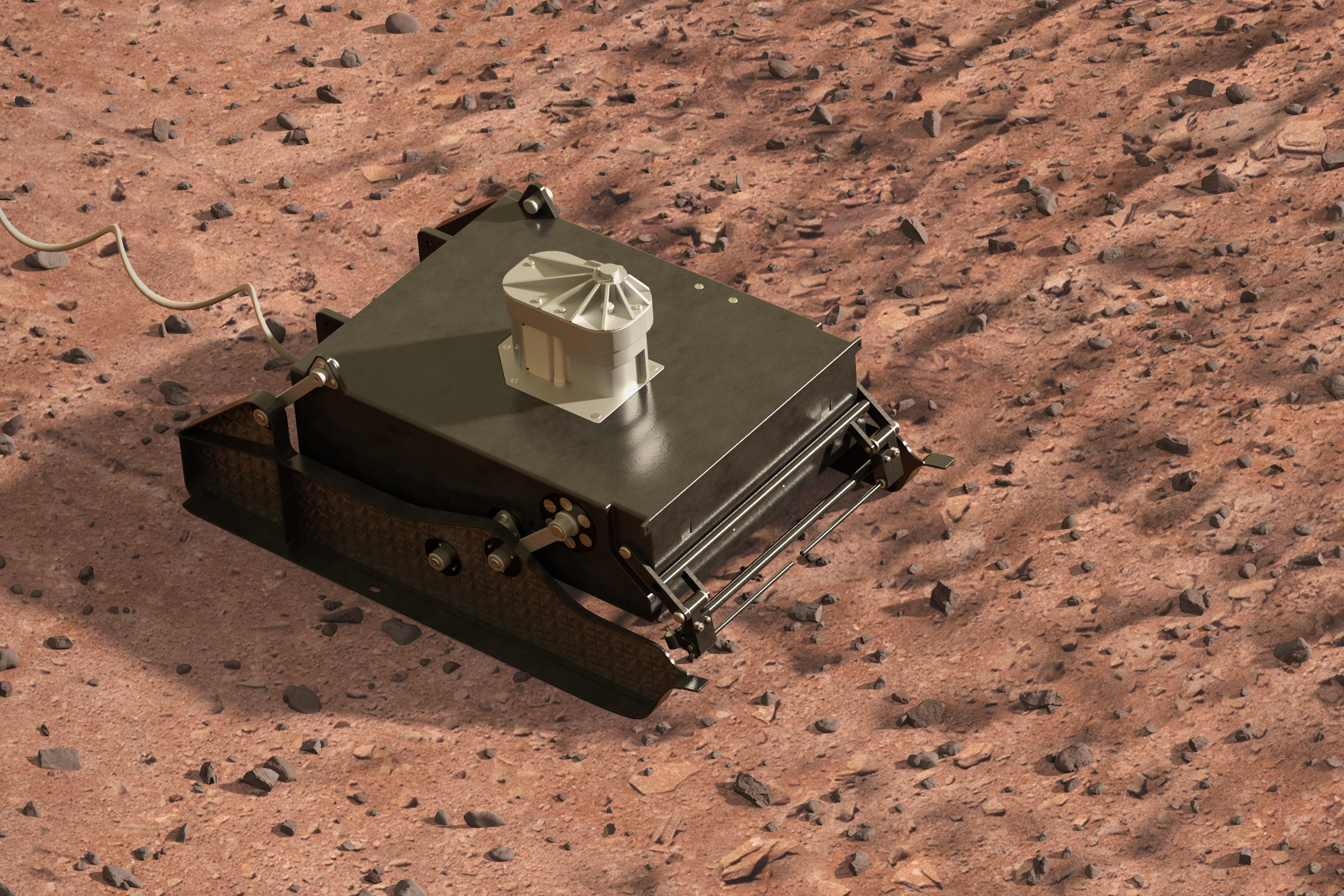
- Rendering of the PrOP-M
- Mission type: Mars rover
- Operator: Soviet Space Program

Spacecraft properties
- Manufacturer: Mobile Vehicle Engineering Institute

Start of mission
- Launch date: 1971

PrOP-M (Russian: Прибор оценки проходимости — Марс (ПрОП-М), Passability Estimating Vehicle for Mars or Device Evaluation Terrain—Mars) were two Soviet Mars rovers that were launched on the unsuccessful Mars 2 and Mars 3 missions in 1971. PrOP-M were the first rovers to be launched to Mars, 26 years before the first successful rover mission of NASA's Sojourner in 1997. Because the Mars 2 and Mars 3 missions failed, the existence of the rovers was kept secret for nearly 20 years.

The rovers, built by a team led by Alexander Kemurdzhian, were small, rectangular devices that were tethered to the lander and used skis for movement.

== History ==
PrOP-M on the manipulator arm of the lander

Rover moving during a field testing

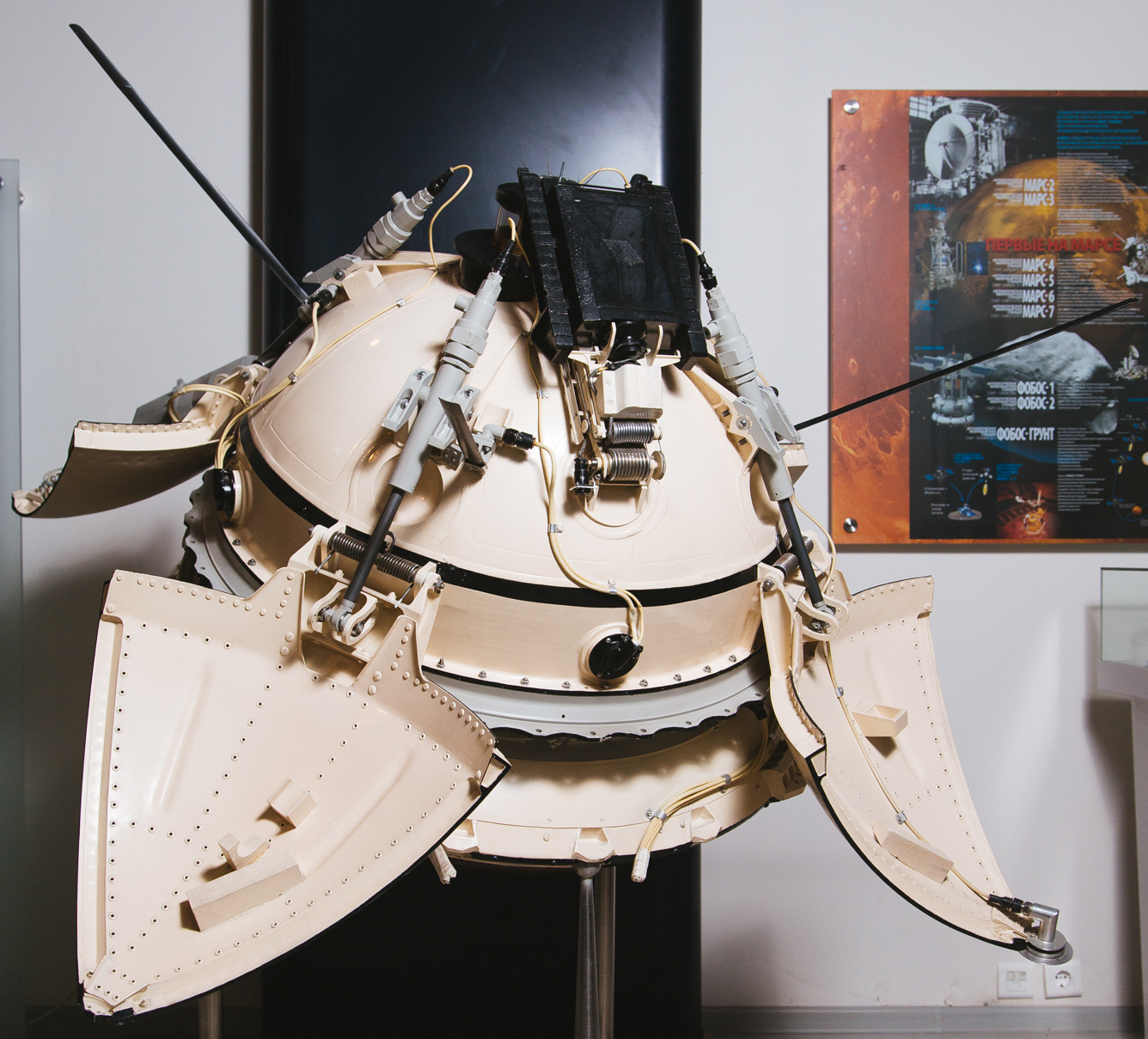
Mars 3 Lander model at the Memorial Museum of Cosmonautics in Moscow. PrOP-M is seen on top.

The PrOP-M rover was designed and manufactured at the Mobile Vehicle Engineering Institute (VNIITransmash) by a team of approximately 150 engineers led by Alexander Kemurdzhian, who also developed the Lunokhod rover.

The Mars 2 and Mars 3 landers each carried a PrOP-M rover, designed to move across the Martian surface on skis while connected to the lander with a 15-meter (49 ft)-long power cable. Two small metal rods were used for autonomous obstacle avoidance because radio signals from Earth would have taken too long to drive the rovers using remote control. Each rover carried a dynamic penetrometer (made by Transmash) and a gamma-ray densitometer (made by the Institute of Geochemistry of the Soviet Academy of Sciences). After landing, the rovers were planned to be placed on the Martian surface by a 6-joint manipulator arm and to move in the field of view of the lander's cameras. They would have stopped to make measurements every 1.5 m (4.9 ft), with maximum range of 15 m (49 ft)—the length of the tether. The rovers' tracks in the Martian soil would have been used to determine the soil's material properties.

The rovers' main chassis was a 4.5-kilogram (9.9 lb) square box with a small protrusion at the center. Sources differ on the dimensions of the rover. (Note: Sources give the following numbers: 25 cm × 22 cm × 4 cm (9.8 in × 8.7 in × 1.6 in), 25 cm × 25 cm × 4 cm (9.8 in × 9.8 in × 1.6 in), 21.5 cm × 16 cm × 6 cm (8.5 in × 6.3 in × 2.4 in), 25 cm × 20 cm × 4 cm (9.8 in × 7.9 in × 1.6 in)) The frame was supported on two wide, flat skis, one extending from each side, elevating the frame slightly above the surface. At the front of the box were obstacle detection bars. Rover's maximum speed was up to 1 meter per hour. PrOP-M was the only rover that used skis for locomotion, all other rovers used wheels.

The rover had an algorithm to overcome obstacles: when it approached one, it was programmed to reverse and "use the skids on alternate sides to walk around the obstacle".

The first rover was destroyed in the November 27, 1971 crash landing of Mars 2, launched May 19, 1971. The second one was launched on May 28, 1971 on Mars 3 and was lost when the lander stopped communicating 110 seconds after landing on December 2, 1971. The loss of communication may have been due to the extremely powerful Martian dust storm taking place at the time or a problem with the Mars 3 orbiter's ability to relay communications. The second rover was never deployed. The rover missions were secret and were not mentioned in official news reports about the landings; their existence was revealed almost 20 years later in 1990. The PrOP-M rovers preceded NASA's 1997 Sojourner by 26 years. Authors of the Planetary Landers and Entry Probes wrote that Mars 6 and Mars 7 also carried PrOP-M rovers.

A model of the rover can now be seen in the Memorial Museum of Cosmonautics in Moscow, another is in the Museum of Space and Missile Technology in Saint Petersburg.
