= List of Armenian Nobel laureates =

Three individuals of Armenian ethnicity or ancestry have won Nobel Prizes since 2020. The following is a complete list of Nobel laureates of Armenian descent:

== Laureates ==
Year	Image	Laureate	Born	Field	Citation	Ancestry
2020		Emmanuelle Charpentier	1968 in France	Chemistry	"developed a method for high-precision genome editing."	partial ancestry (Armenian paternal grandfather)
2021		Ardem Patapoutian	1967 in Lebanon	Physiology or Medicine	"investigated how pressure is translated into nerve impulses."	full ancestry (both parents of Lebanese Armenian descent)
2024		Daron Acemoglu	1967 in Turkey	Economics	"have demonstrated the importance of societal institutions for a country’s prosperity."	full ancestry (both parents of Turkish Armenian descent)

Dork Sahagian contributed to three of four assessment reports by the Intergovernmental Panel on Climate Change (IPCC), which was jointly awarded the 2007 Nobel Peace Prize with former vice president Al Gore. He described his contribution as "only very minor, involving humanity’s effect on sea level rise."

== Nominations ==
=== Nominees ===
Image	Nominee	Born	Field	Year(s) Nominated	Nominator(s)
	Armen Alchian	1914 in Los Angeles, California, U.S.	Economics	1986	William R. Allen
	Garo Paylan	1972 in Istanbul, Turkey	Peace	2018, 2020	Siranush Ghazachyan
	Ruben Vardanyan	1968 in Yerevan, Armenian SSR, USSR	Peace	2024	Group of renowned public and political figures
	Giacomo Luigi Ciamician	1857 in Trieste, Austrian Empire	Chemistry	1905, 1907, 1908, 1911, 1912, 1914, 1916, 1919, 1921	Icilio Guareschi (1905), Emil Fischer, Henri Moissan (1907), Emil Fischer (1908), Ludwig Wolff (1911), Ludwig Knorr (1912), Max Bamberger, Josef Maria Eder, Wilhelm Suida, Georg Vortmann, Carl Dietrich Harries (1914), Leone Pesci (1916), Giorgio Errera (1919), Camillo Golgi, Vito Volterra, Georg Vortmann (1921)
	Alicia Ghiragossian	1936 in Córdoba, Argentina	Literature	1997	
	Zbigniew Herbert	1924 in Lwów, Poland	Literature	1968	Nominated jointly with Graham Greene and Sławomir Mrożek by Karl Ragnar Gierow (1904–1982) the only time
	Henri Troyat	1911 in Moscow, Russian Empire	Literature	1965	Nominated by Ernst Dickenmann
	Varujan Vosganian	1958 in Craiova, Romania	Literature	2013, 2014, 2015	

== See also ==
- List of Armenian inventors and discoverers
- List of Nobel laureates by country
