= Coffee vending machine =

Machine that dispenses hot beverages

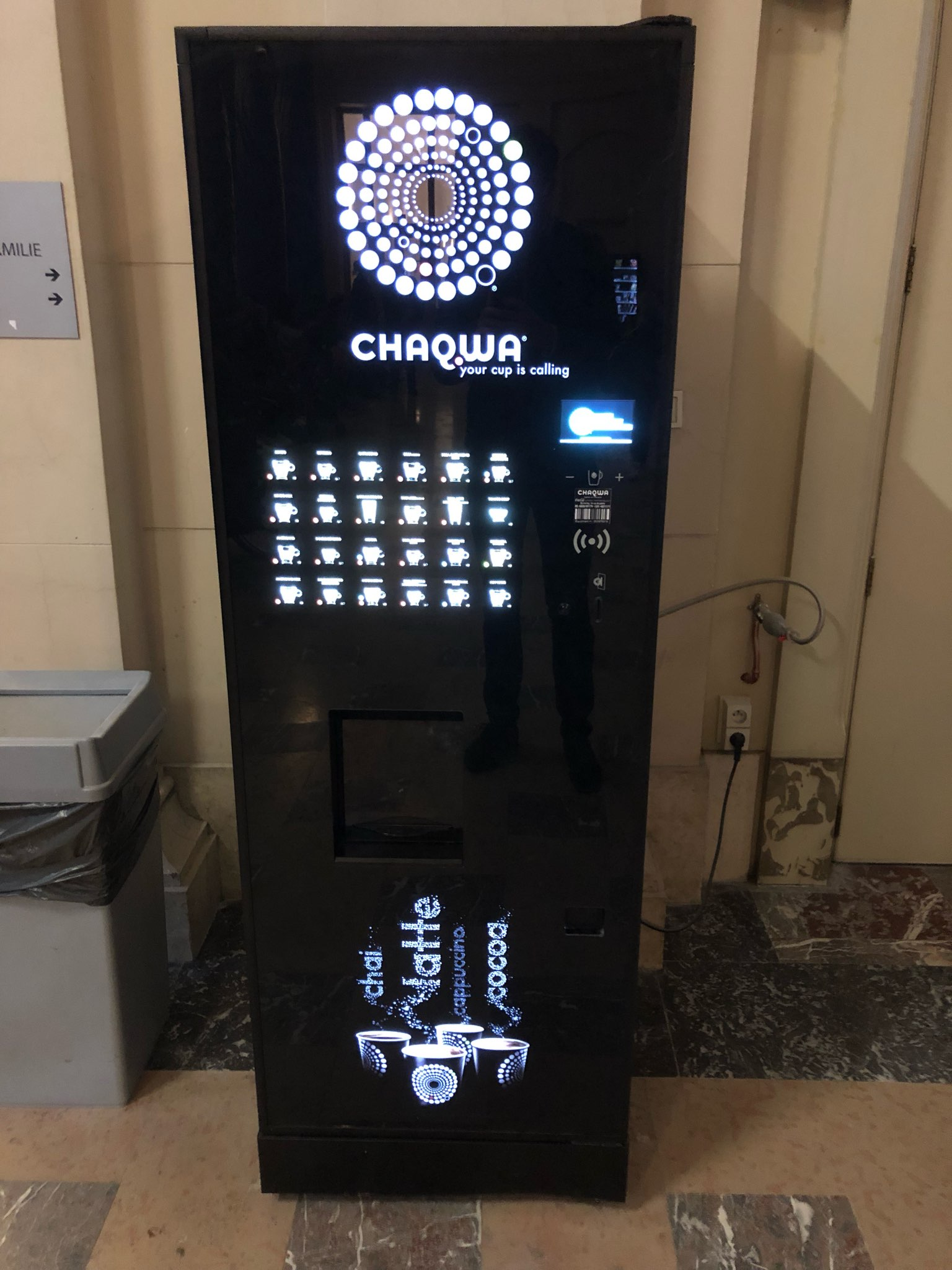
A modern coffee vending machine in Leuven, Belgium

The coffee vending machine is a vending machine that dispenses hot coffee and other coffee beverages. Older models used instant coffee or concentrated liquid coffee and hot or boiling water, and provided condiments such as cream and sugar. Some modern machines prepare various coffee styles such as mochas and lattes and use ground drip coffee, and some fresh-grind the coffee to order using a grinder in the machine.

The machine was invented in the United States by the Rudd-Melikian company in 1947, debuting as the "Kwik Kafe". Several U.S. companies also began manufacturing the machines in 1947, and by 1955 over 60,000 existed in the U.S. Today, coffee vending machines exist in various areas of the world, and are very common in Japan.

== Overview ==
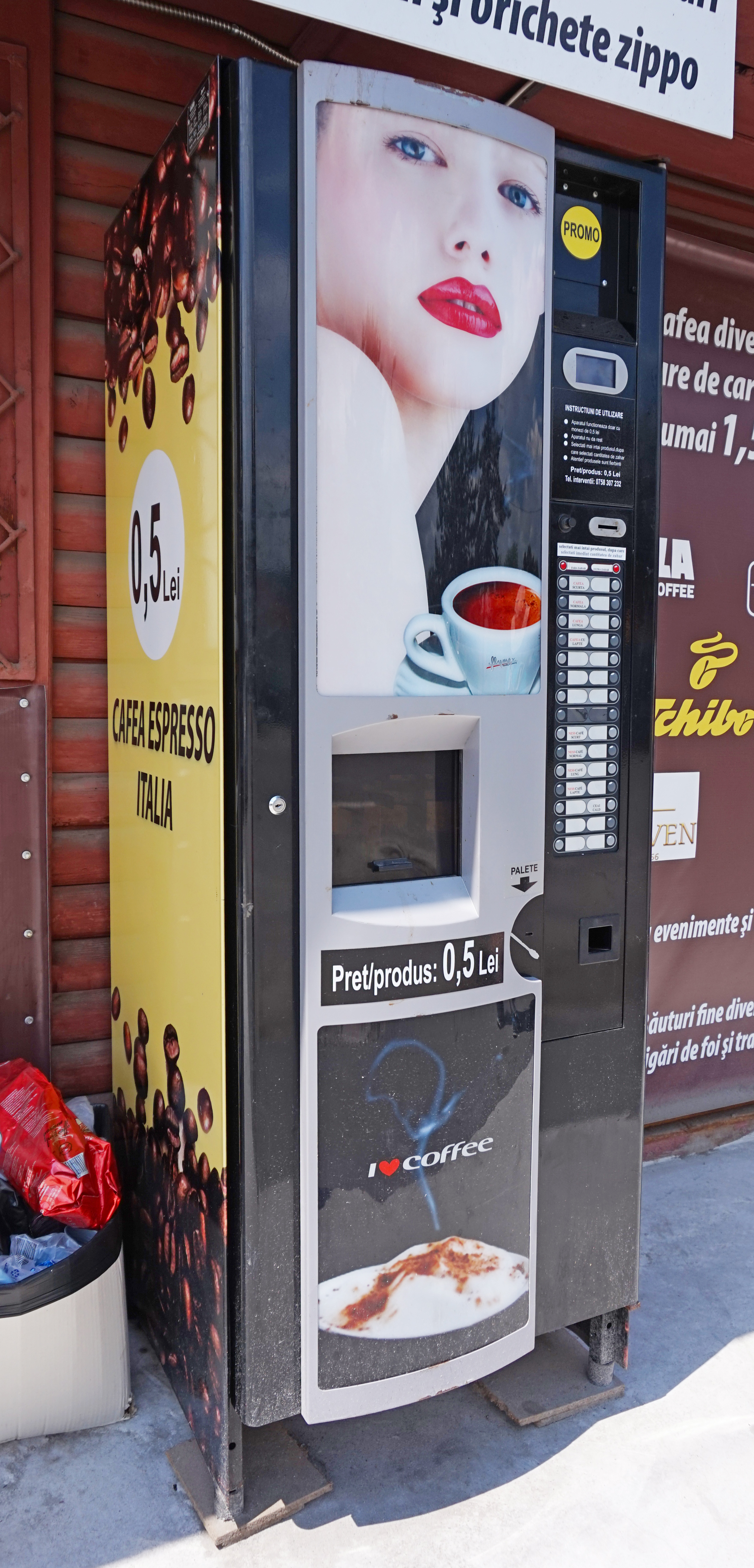
A coffee vending machine in Romania

A coffee vending machine is a type of vending machine that dispenses hot coffee. Some of the machines, particularly older models, utilize powdered instant coffee mixed with hot water, and some of these offer condiments such as cream and sugar. Some newer models fresh-brew the coffee using hot water and ground coffee beans, and some also grind the coffee to order using coffee grinders installed in the machines, as well as providing various condiments. Some modern machines also provide other hot drinks such as tea, espresso, lattes, cappuccinos, mochas and hot chocolate. Some of the machines dispense canned coffee, and some dispense both hot coffee and iced coffee.

Public coffee vending machines typically require payment, functioning as coin-operated machines, and some also accept bills and credit cards. Some do not require payment; these are typically found at places of employment, whereby the company furnishes the beverage to employees free of charge.

Machines that purvey hot and iced coffee are common in Japan, and many of them are placed in street locations. In Italy, some of the machines purvey up to 18 coffee varieties.

== History ==
The coffee vending machine was invented in the United States by the Rudd-Melikian company of Philadelphia, Pennsylvania, in 1947, and the machine was named the Kwik Kafe. (Note: "In Philadelphia two ex-servicemen, Lloyd Rudd and K. C. Melikian, invented a hot-coffee vending machine, and although the vending industry refused to take their invention seriously at first, the public welcomed it and hot-coffee vending had made a start.") The machine would drop a paper cup through a chute onto a platform and fill the cup with hot coffee prepared using instant coffee and hot water. The Kwik Kafe took five seconds to prepare a cup of coffee. The Kwik Kafe machines were placed in U.S. locations through the process of franchising. At a 1948 convention in Philadelphia, Lloyd K. Rudd, president of the Rudd-Melikian company, stated that Kwik Kafe machines purveyed 250,000 cups of coffee on a daily basis.

Additional companies that manufactured coffee vending machines in 1947 in the United States include the Manning & Lewis company, Knapway Devices and the Bert Mills Corporation. Some machines in 1947 used a liquid coffee concentrate that was mixed with boiling water, and one such machine charged a nickel for a cup of coffee and dispensed a wooden spoon to mix the cream and sugar. By the year 1955, over 60,000 coffee vending machines existed in the United States, despite a poor reputation; one publication wrote of "vending machines spewing out tar-like fluid in white plastic cups".

== Concept machines ==
Touch screen coffee machines, such as those introduced by Bella, Bravilor Bonamat and La Marquise are becoming increasingly popular as they allow closer engagement with customers. In 2009, Douwe Egberts introduced a conceptual coffee vending machine named BeMoved, which has touch screens with drag and drop features to select ingredients and interactive features such as the ability to access news, weather information and stock prices as the coffee is prepared. The BeMoved machine also has a motion-sensitive video camera that can take an image of the user and remember the user's coffee preferences via personal profile settings, as well as an interactive video game named Shoot-Em-Up, which involves jumping in front of the machine while the camera and software coordinate the jumping with the video game play.

== Gallery ==
Coffee vending machine

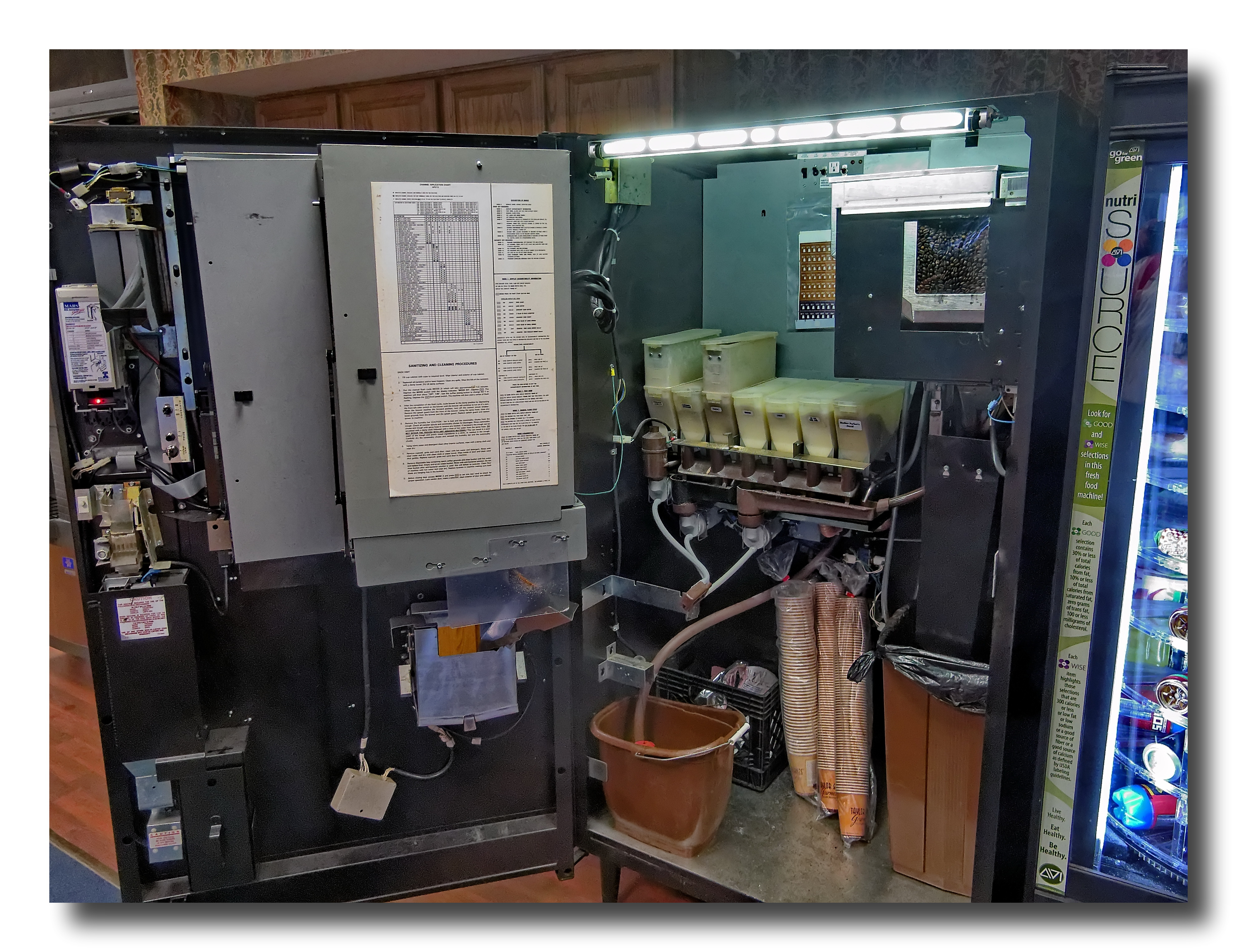
Mechanisms inside of a coffee vending machine

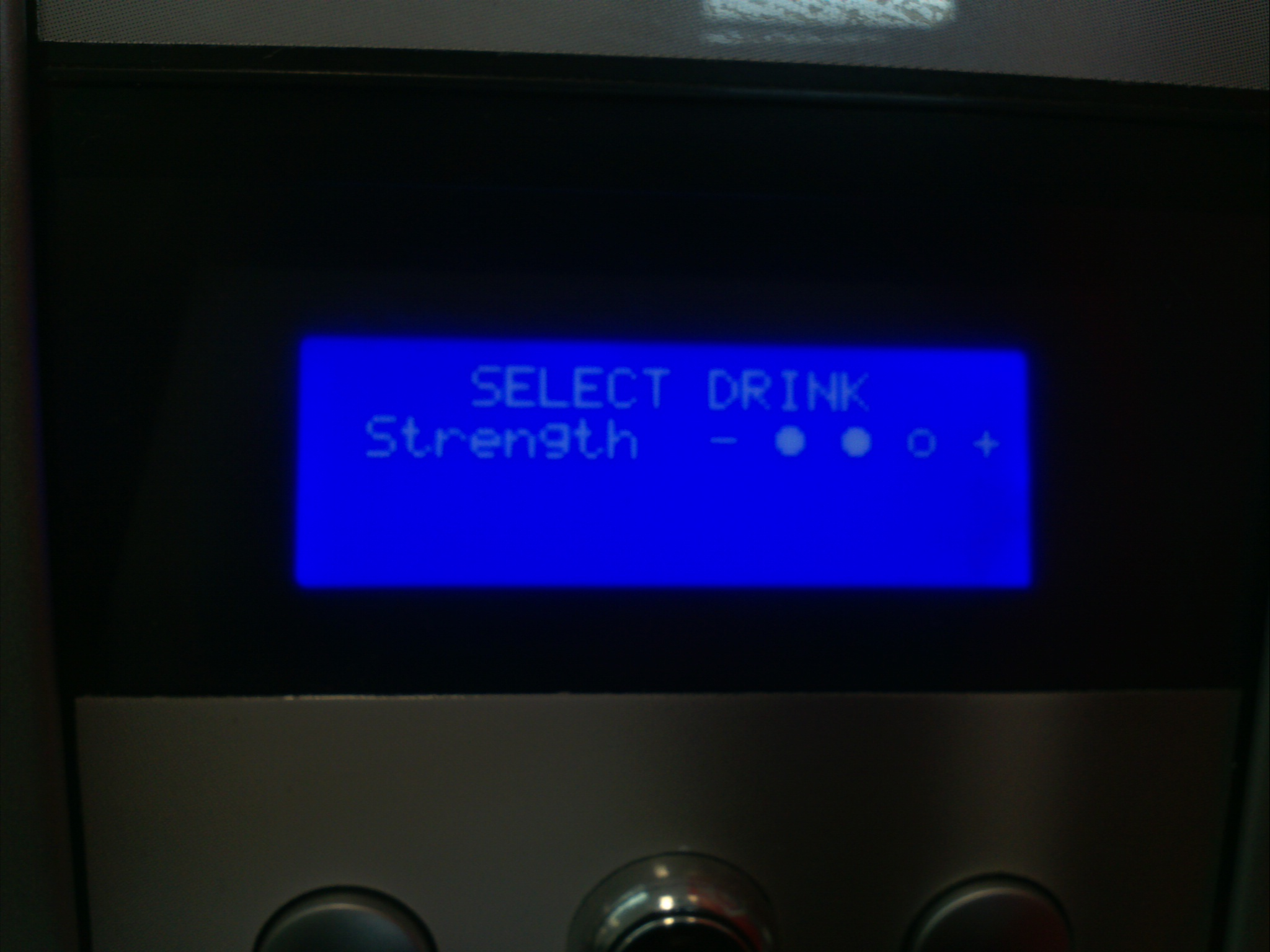
An option to select coffee strength on a machine

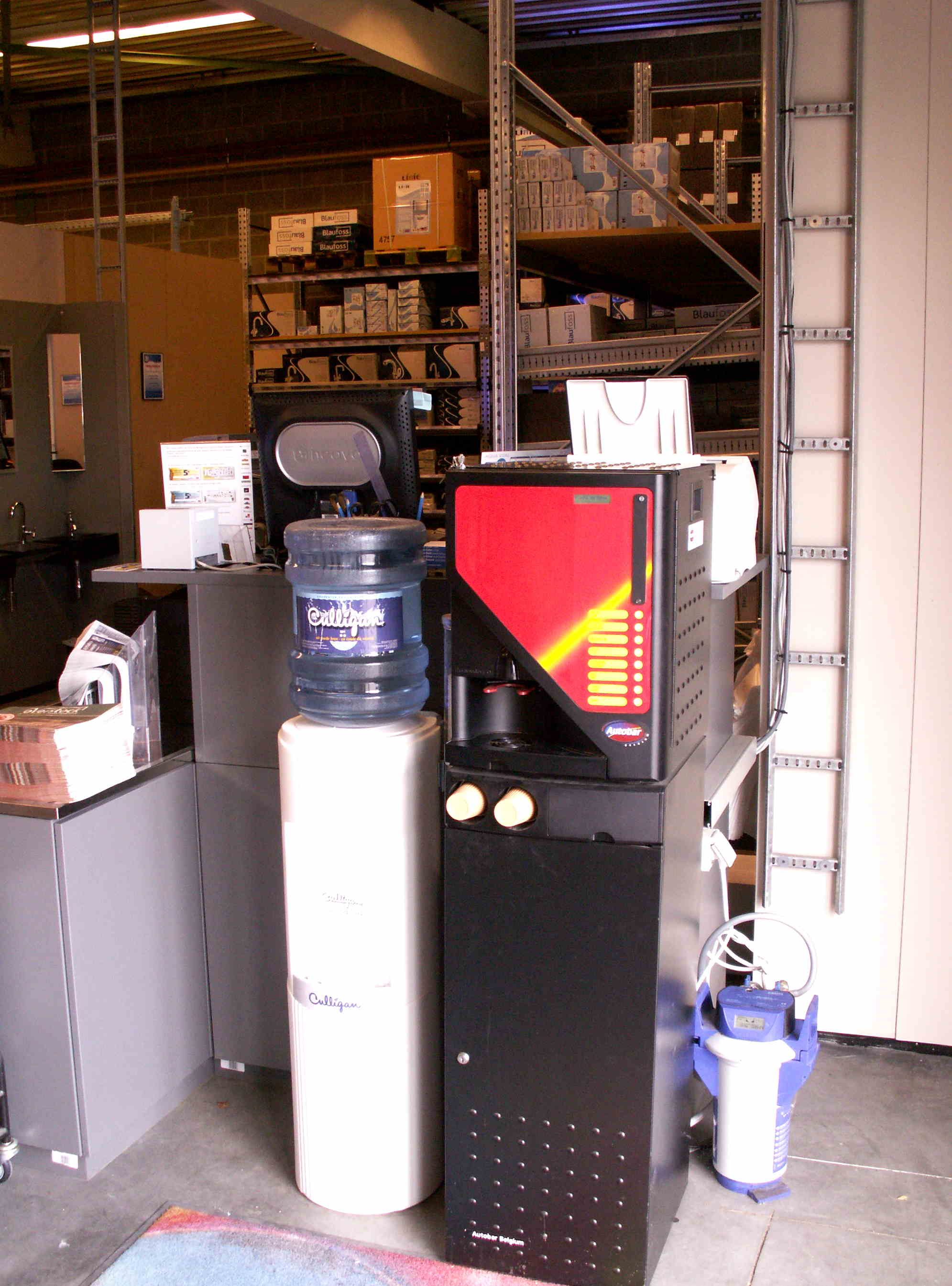
A machine (right) and water cooler at a work environment

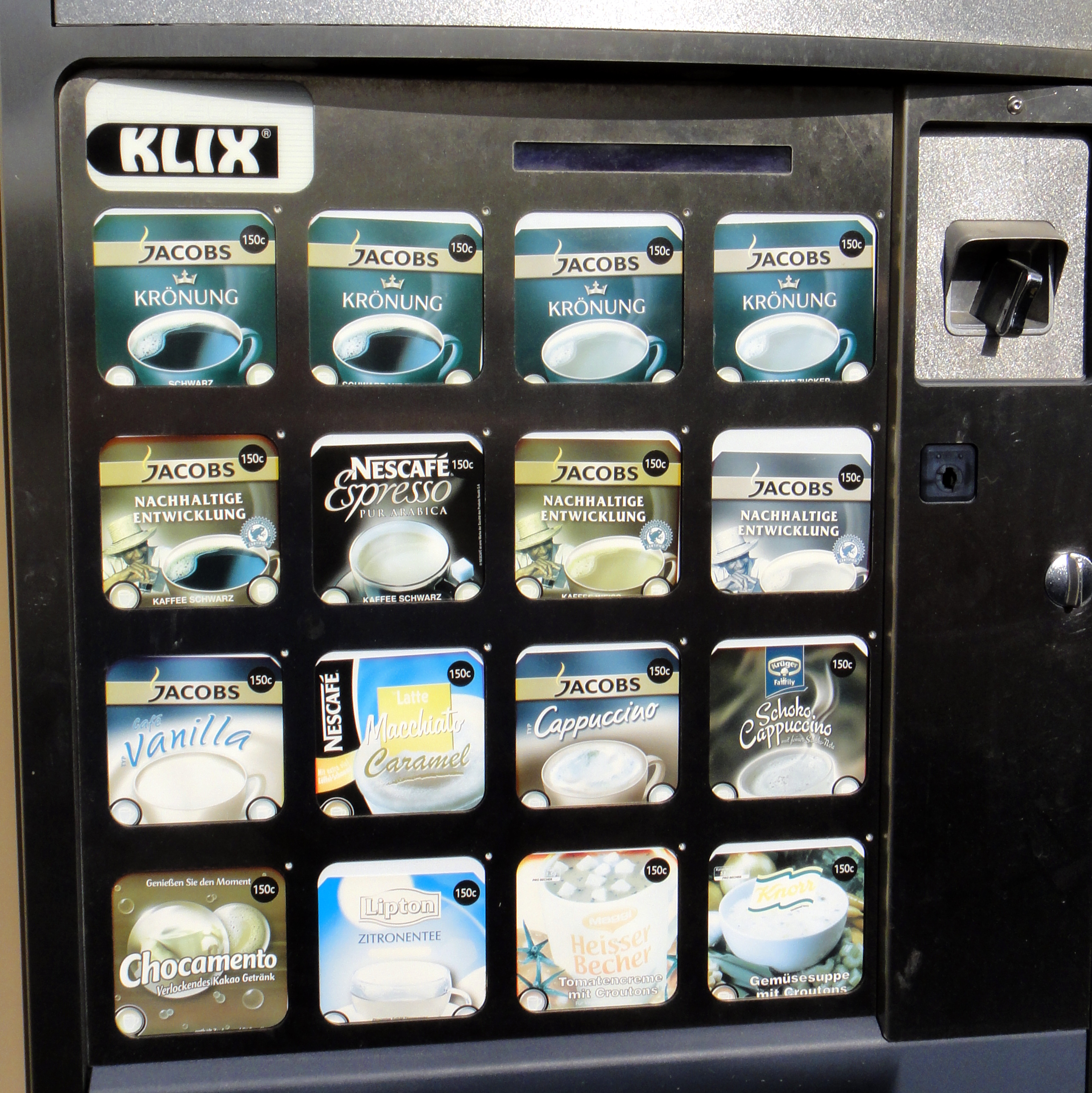
A machine in Berlin, Germany

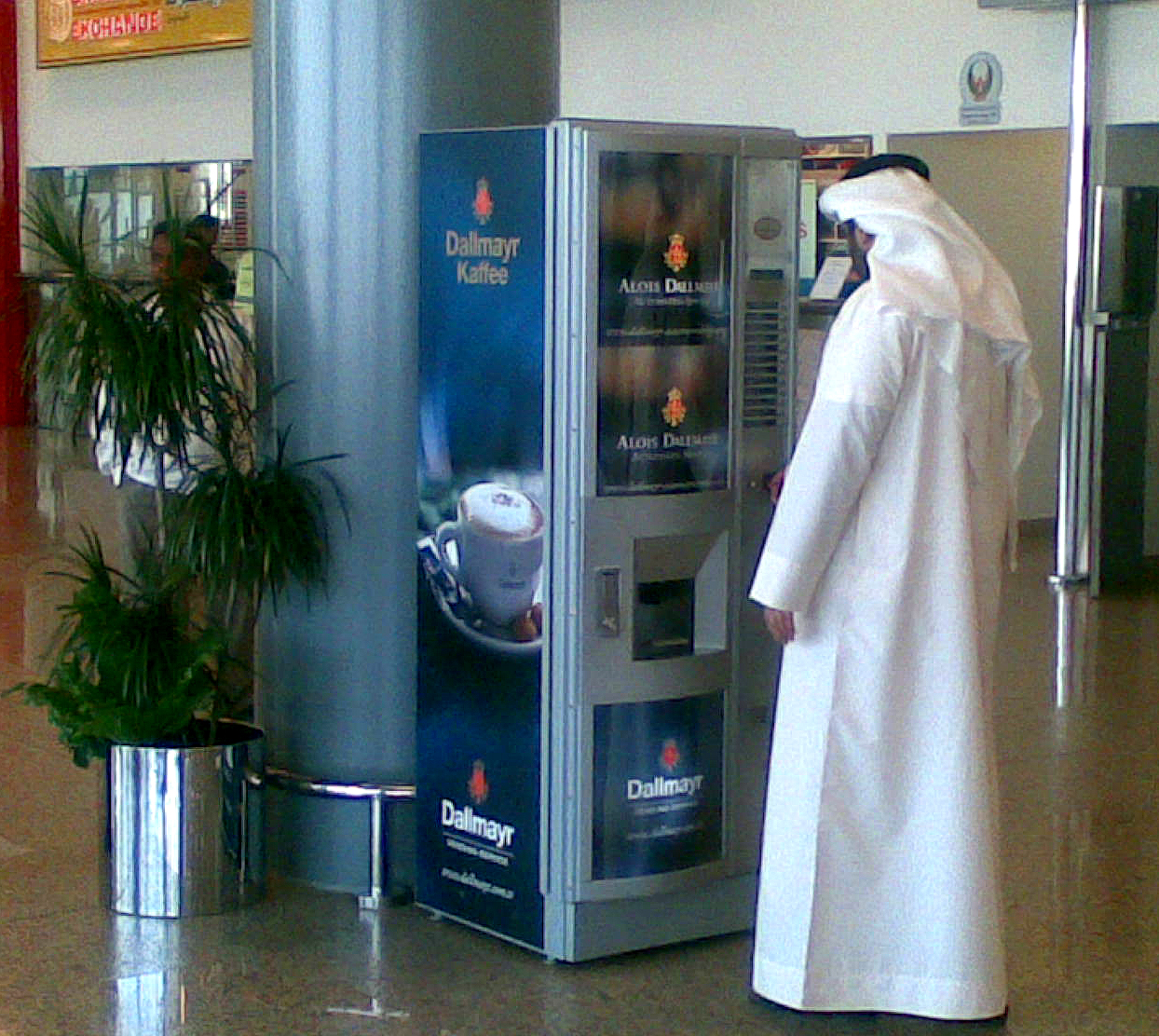
A Dallmayr coffee vending machine in Dubai, United Arab Emirates

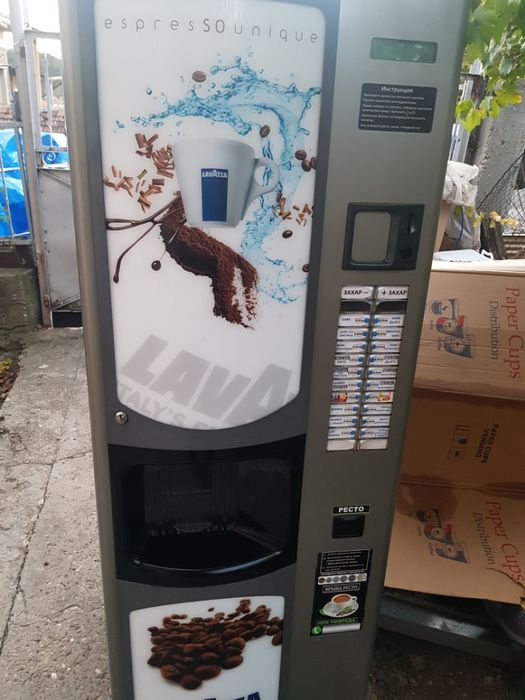
A coffee vending machine in Bulgaria

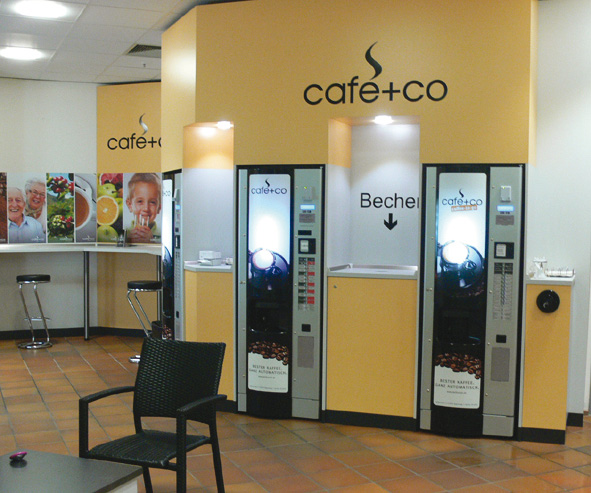
Machines at the Ingolstadt Hauptbahnhof railway station in Ingolstadt, Germany

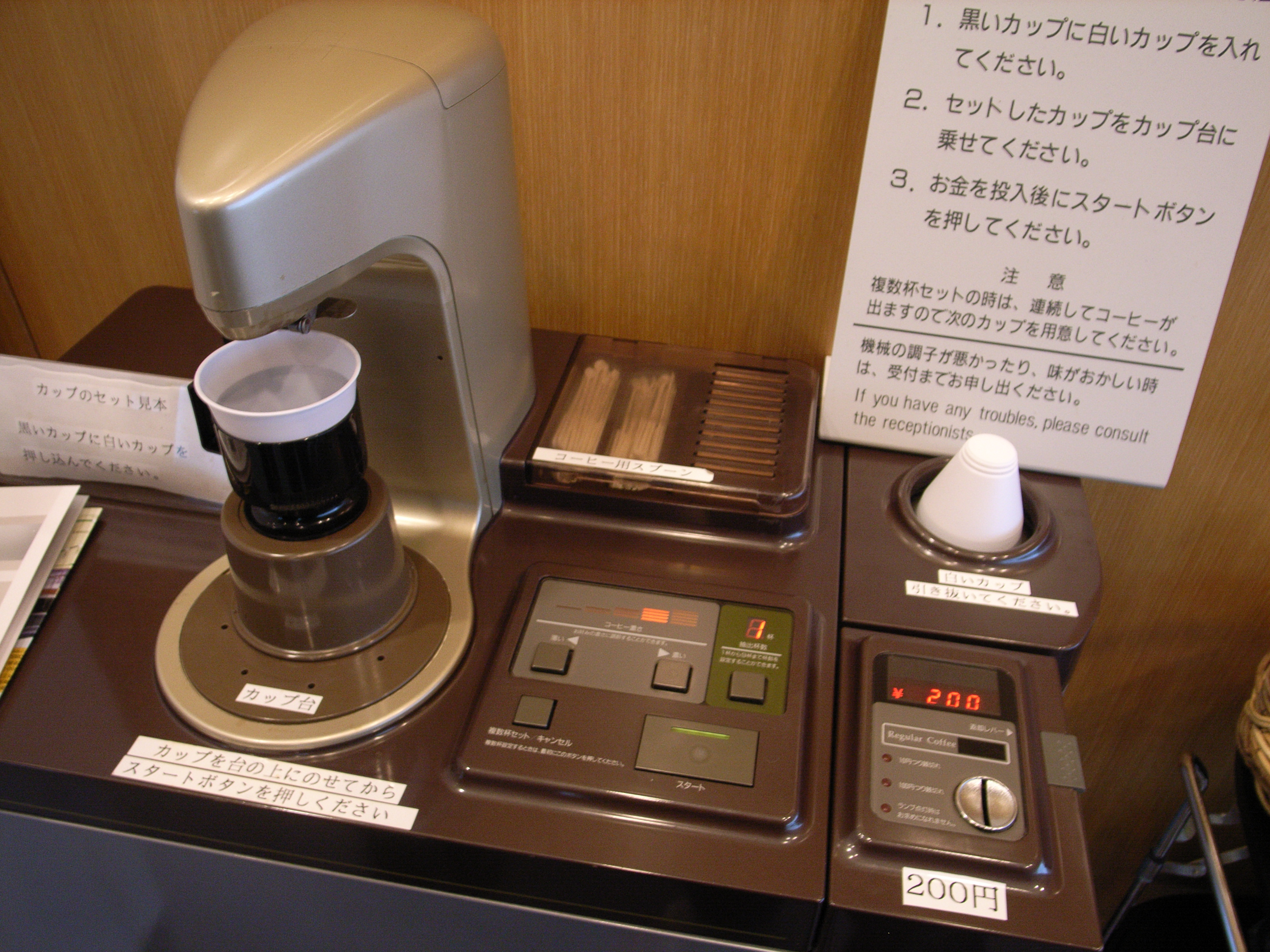
A machine in Tottori, Japan

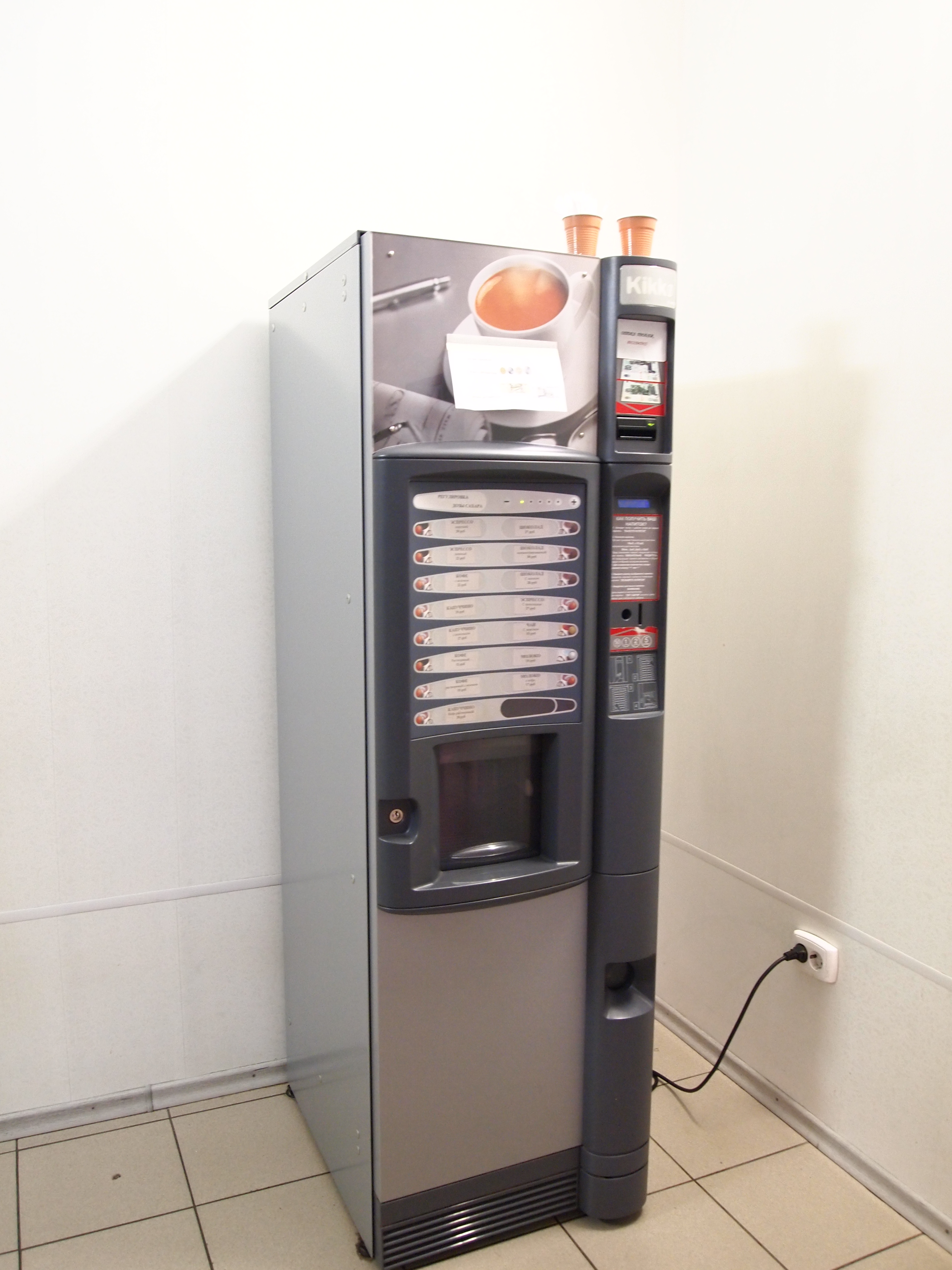
A Russian machine

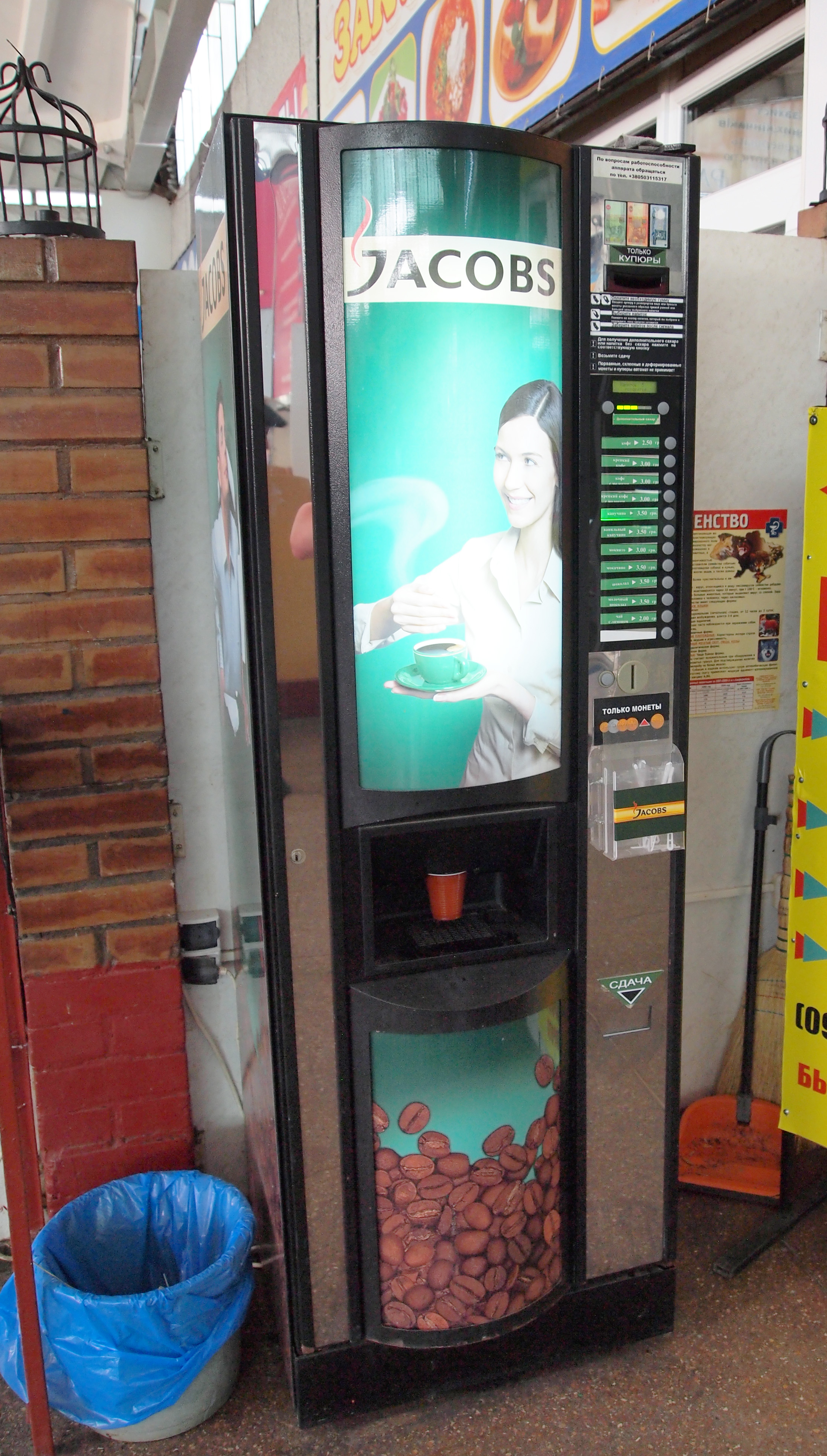
A machine in Simferopol, a city on the Crimean peninsula

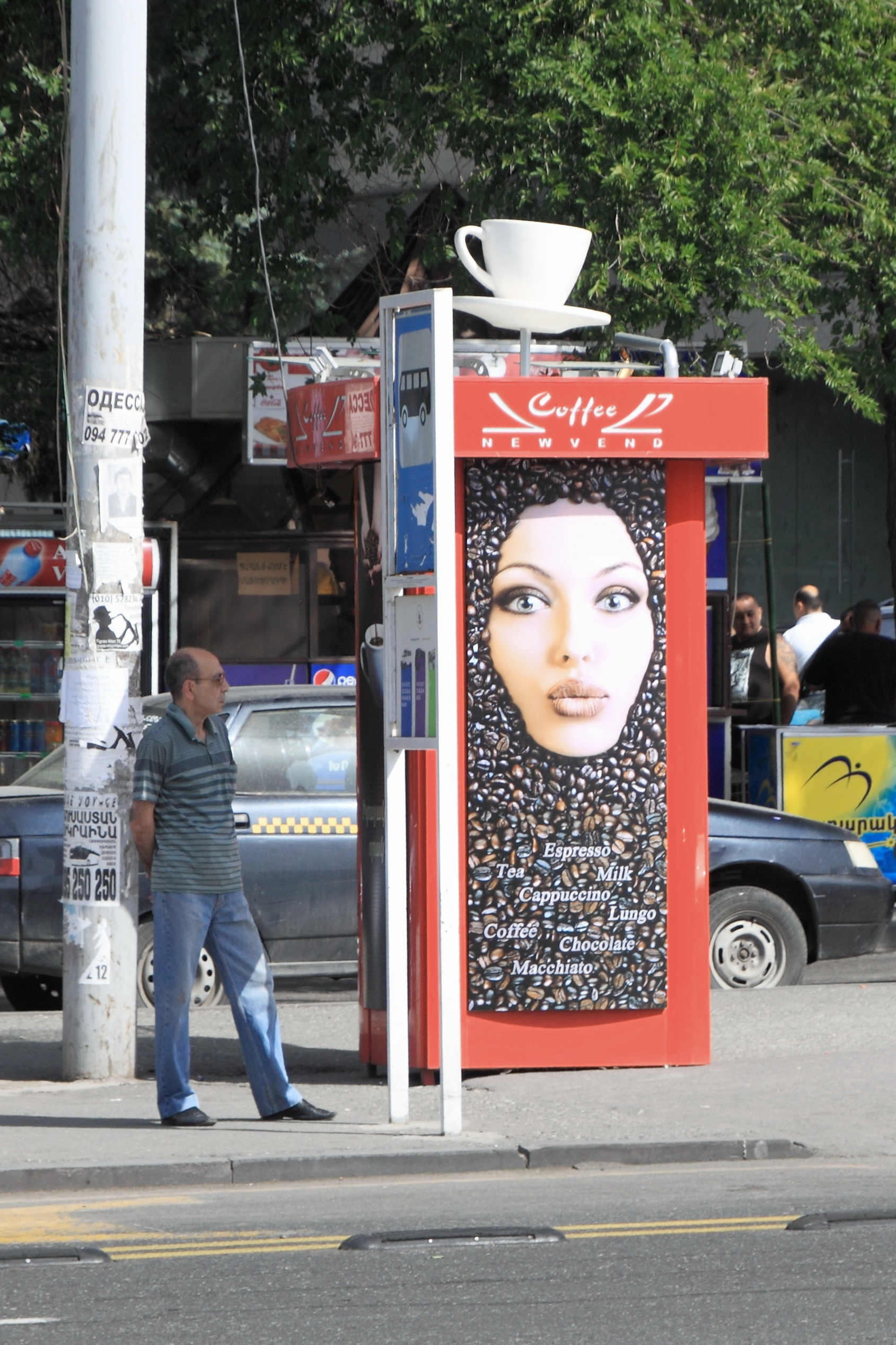
A machine in Yerevan, Armenia

== See also ==
- Automated retail
- Coffee break
- Coffeemaker
- Espresso machine
- Self-service
