= Brian Harvey (author) =

Irish writer

Brian Harvey (born 1953) is a space writer, author and broadcaster who lives in Ireland, Brian Harvey has long written about China's space program as well as the space programs of India and Japan. He has written articles on spaceflight from the 1970s in such magazines as Orbit, Astronomy and Space, Go Taikonauts! and Spaceflight and for newspapers such as the Sunday Press and the Irish Independent. His articles have been published in Astronomy Now, Space Quarterly, Space Policy, ROOM, the Journal of the British Interplanetary Society, Space Chronicle, Zenit and Quest.

He has broadcast on the BBC World Service, Canadian Broadcasting Corporation, Voice of America, China Television (Dialogue - ideas matter), BBC Radio 4 and Radio 5 and BBC Northern Ireland. He has contributed to films by the Canadian Broadcasting Corporation (Mir), Danish television (closed ecological systems) and Australian television (the H-II Japanese rocket), subsequently shown on the Discovery channel. He has been interviewed for The Observer, Christian Science Monitor, The Guardian, Наша Газета (Nasha Gazeta), Ça m’intéresse (https://www.caminteresse.fr), Weekendavisen Scientific American, Forbes, Avaunt, La Presse (Canada), Quartz, Time out Shanghai, Open Skies and The Hindu.

He is a Fellow of the British Interplanetary Society (FBIS) and co-chaired its annual Sino-Russian forum for a number of years. The President of Ireland appointed him to the Board of the School of Cosmic Physics of the Dublin Institute for Advanced Studies. Brian Harvey contributed to the review of space policy by the British government that led to the establishment of the UK Space Agency (UKSA). Marking the 50th anniversary of human spaceflight, he opened the UK Yuri Gagarin exhibition, organized by the Princess Dashkova Centre of the University of Edinburgh.

He holds a primary degree in History and Political Science from Dublin University (Trinity College) and a MA in economic and social history from University College Dublin. These are his books and texts, some of which have been translated into Chinese, Russian, Korean and German.

== Bibliography ==
- Race into space - a history of the Soviet space programme (1988)
- The new Russian space programme - from competition to collaboration (1996)
- Two roads into space - the Japanese and Indian space programmes (1999)
- Russia in space - the failed frontier? also published in Korean (2001)
- Europe's space programme (2003) (editor)
- The Chinese Space Programme - from conception to manned spaceflight (2004)
- Rebirth of the Russian Space programme (2007)
- Soviet planetary exploration, also published in Chinese (2007)
- Soviet lunar exploration, also published in Chinese (2007)
- Space exploration Annual (with David Harland) (2008)
- Emerging Space Powers (with Theo Pirard and Henk Smid) (2010)
- Russian space probes (with Olga Zakutnyaya) (2011)
- Discovering the cosmos with small spacecraft - the US Explorer programme (2018)
- China in Space - the great leap, 2nd edition, 2019
- European - Russian cooperation in space: from de Gaulle to ExoMars (2021)
- The Atlas of Space Rocket Launch Sites (with Gurbir Singh) (2022)
- Japan in space - past, present and future (2023)

== Book chapters ==
- Opening chapter, Hiding in plain view in Cold war space sleuths - the untold secrets of the Soviet space programme by Dominic Phelan (ed) (2013)
- Yuri Galperin, Cosmos 5 and Starfish in Lev Zelenyi & Tatiana Mulyarchik (eds): Yuri Galperin. Moscow, Institute for Space Research/Russian Academy of Sciences, published in Russian as Юрий Галперин, Космос 5 и Starfish: Юрий Ильич Галперин - 80лет со дня рожения - Рассказы Друзей, Коллег, Учеников. ИКИ, Москва, (2012)
- China’s lunar programme, in Moon - architectural guide by Paul Meuser (ed), DOM Berlin.
- Biological experiments in space - China in Erik Seedhouse (ed): Handbook of Life Support Systems for Spacecraft and Extraterrestrial Habitats. Springer, 2018
- 40. Jahrestag der Gründung des Instituts für Kosmosforschung – eine persönliche Reflexion. Leibniz Online, Nr. 43 (2021) in German and English

== Additional sources ==
- An audio interview of Neil Armstrong by Brian Harvey at Trinity College, Dublin, on 4 July 1976
- The Soviet Mars Shot That Almost Everyone Forgot. Radio Free Europe. July 2020.
- China Is About To Launch A Secretive Mission To Mars. Here's What We Know (And Don't Know) So Far. Forbes July 2020.
- The Real Story - China in Space. May 2020. BBC World World Service
- Military space: Room.Eu
- Russia’s space programme Podcast: Astrotalkuk
- European/Russian cooperation in space, Alliance française. Facebook Live
- European space cooperation de Gaulle to ExoMars. Podcast. Astrotalkuk
- The Space Silk Road and China’s Space Programme.Podcast: Belt & Road Institute in Sweden
- Atlas of Space Rocket Launch Sites, Unfrozen
- China In Space The Great Leap Forward. BIS West Midlands
- China In Space – The Science, Observation and Application Programmes. BIS West Midlands
- Japan in space. BIS West Midlands
- Japan in Space. Podcast Aviation Xtended Episode 191
- The secrets of Exomars. The Space Review
