= Cyrus Melikian =

- Born: Khoren Cyrus Sirak Melikian; November 24, 1920; Philadelphia, Pennsylvania, US
- Died: November 27, 2008 (aged 88); Philadelphia County, Pennsylvania, US
- Occupation: Inventor

Khoren Cyrus Sirak Melikian (November 24, 1920–November 27 2008) was an Armenian-American coffee industry pioneer credited with several inventions that propelled coffee use into the American public. He is credited, along with his business partner, Lloyd Rudd, as the inventor of the coffee vending machine and the first US fresh-brew machine. Furthermore, Cyrus was instrumental in several other inventions, including coffee pods, post-mix vendor icemakers, and in-machine coffee bean grinders.

He initiated the Culinary Institute at Rockland Mansion in Fairmount Park. Melikian also established the Flavor-Maker Culinary Chef's Training School, and taught there for 10 years. Melikian was awarded with the Person of the Year Award by the Tea & Coffee Trade Journal in 2002.

After Rudd-Melikian was sold and became Refreshment Machinery, Melikian and his sons founded Automatic Brewers & Coffee Devices (Conshohocken, PA). Melikian had designed a method of sandwiching finely ground roast coffee between two long strips of filter paper, supplied in rolls for the RMi fresh-brew machine.

Melikian is survived by his grandchildren Pearce Fielding Lockwood, Alexander Melikian, Anayis Melikian, Armen Melikian, Hunter Harrison, and Casey Harrison. All of whom learned about entrepreneurship and coffee from Mr. Melikian.

== Patents ==
- U.S. patent 2,653,733
