= Bravilor Bonamat =

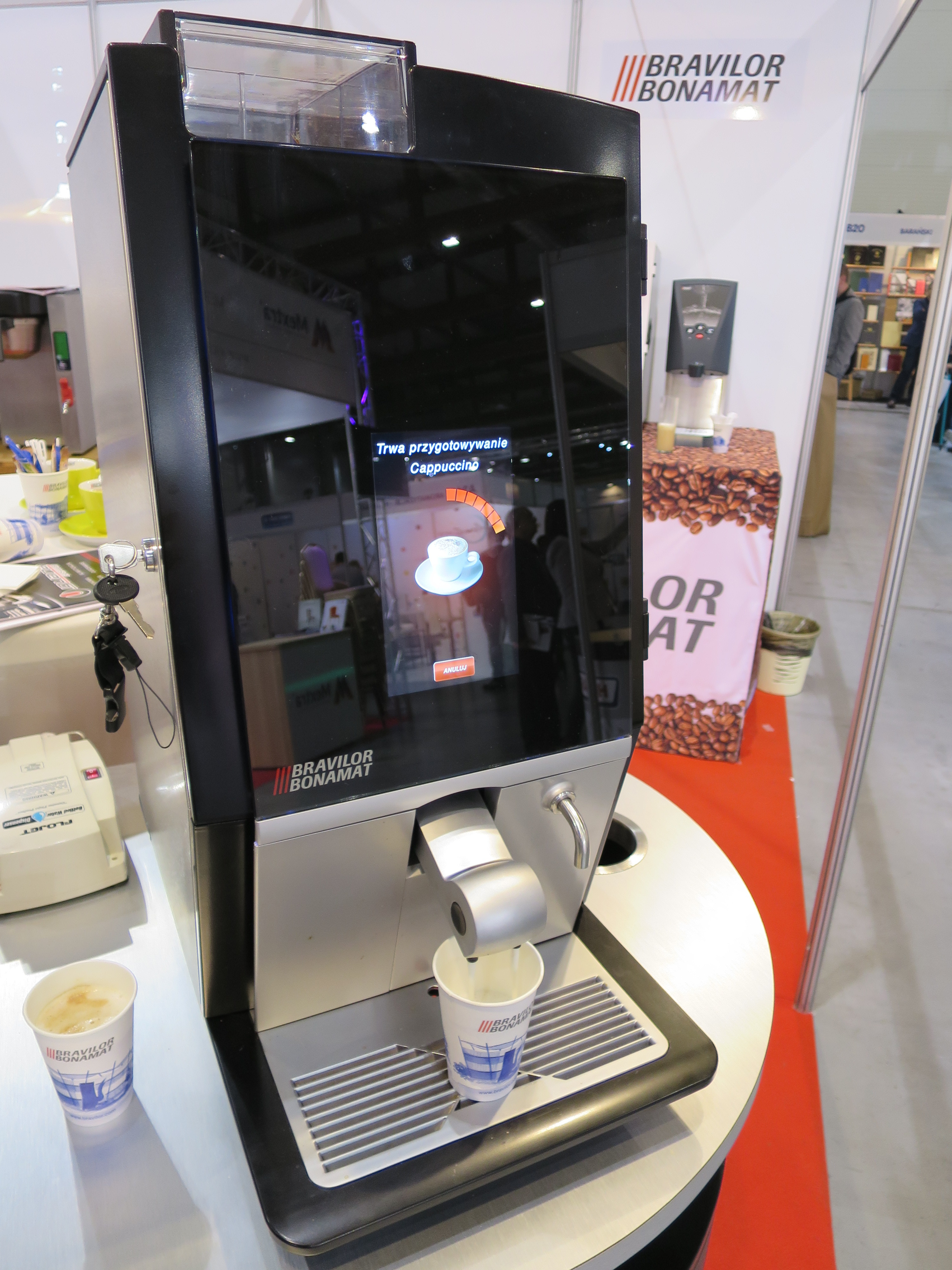
A Bravilor Bonamat coffee machine brewing a cappuccino

Bravilor Bonamat is a Dutch manufacturer of commercial and office-grade coffee machines, espresso machines and hot water dispensers, founded in Amsterdam by A.J.M. Verheijen in 1948. The company originally began as a wholesale reseller of espresso machines, before later branching out into manufacturing.

Typical systems can also make hot soup, froth milk or brew other hot drinks in addition to coffee. More recent units can store fresh milk in a separate internal container, instead of relying on powder.

The company employs over 450 people in offices in Europe and the United States, and has authorized dealers in over 100 countries worldwide. Production of units takes place primarily in Heerhugowaard, The Netherlands. A second production facility in Białystok, Poland, opened in 2018.
