= George Adomian =

American mathematician

- Born: 1922; Buffalo, New York
- Died: June 17, 1996 (aged 73–74); Athens, Georgia
- Occupations: Mathematician; Aerospace engineer

Academic work
- Discipline: Mathematics
- Institutions: University of Georgia

George Adomian (1922 – June 17, 1996) was an American mathematician, aerospace engineer, and academic of Armenian descent. He developed the Adomian decomposition method (ADM) for solving nonlinear differential equations, both ordinary and partial. The method is explained, among other places, in his book Solving Frontier Problems in Physics: The Decomposition Method (Kluwer, Dordrecht, 2004).

He was educated at Cass Technical High School in Detroit. He earned a bachelor's and master's of science in electrical engineering at the University of Michigan and a PhD in physics from UCLA in 1961, advised by David Saxon. His dissertation was titled Linear Stochastic Operators.

He was a professor at Pennsylvania State University from 1964–66, and then was Chair of Applied Mathematics at the University of Georgia (UGA) from 1966 through 1989. While at UGA, he started the Center for Applied Mathematics.

He was a Fellow of the American Association for the Advancement of Science. He was also a member of the Society for Industrial and Applied Mathematics, American Mathematical Society, American Physical Society, Sigma Xi, Tau Beta Pi, Eta Kappa Nu, and Sigma Pi Sigma.

== Selected works ==
- G. Adomian: Stochastic Systems, Academic Press, 1983. ISBN 0-12-044370-8
- G. Adomian: Nonlinear Stochastic Operator Equations, Academic Press, 1986. ISBN 0-12-044375-9
- G. Adomian: Nonlinear Stochastic Systems Theory and Applications to Physics, Kluwer Academic Publishers, 1989. ISBN 90-277-2525-X
