= Mobile Vehicle Engineering Institute =

Russian company

- Type: Open Joint Stock Company
- Founded: 1949
- Headquarters: Saint Petersburg, Russia
- Products: Tanks, Main battle tanks, military vehicles
- Parent: Uralvagonzavod
- Website: www.vniitransmash.ru

Mobile Vehicle Engineering Institute (Russian: ВНИИТрансмаш, romanized: VNIITransmash) is a company based in Saint Petersburg, Russia. It is currently part of Uralvagonzavod.

It designed and built prototypes of tanks, including the T-80, for the Kirov Plant Production Association. It was involved in the conversion of tank technology for civilian applications. It was also the production facility for the Russian Mars rover, which was developed in concert with the Babakin Center and the Russian Space Research Institute.
