= List of Moscow State University people =

The list of Moscow State University people includes notable alumni (including non-graduates) and faculty affiliated with the M. V. Lomonosov Moscow State University (commonly known as Moscow State University), located in Moscow, Russia. A fuller list is available as a category.

== Notable awards recipients ==
=== Nobel laureates ===
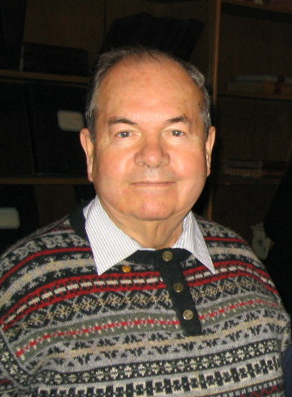
Alexey Abrikosov

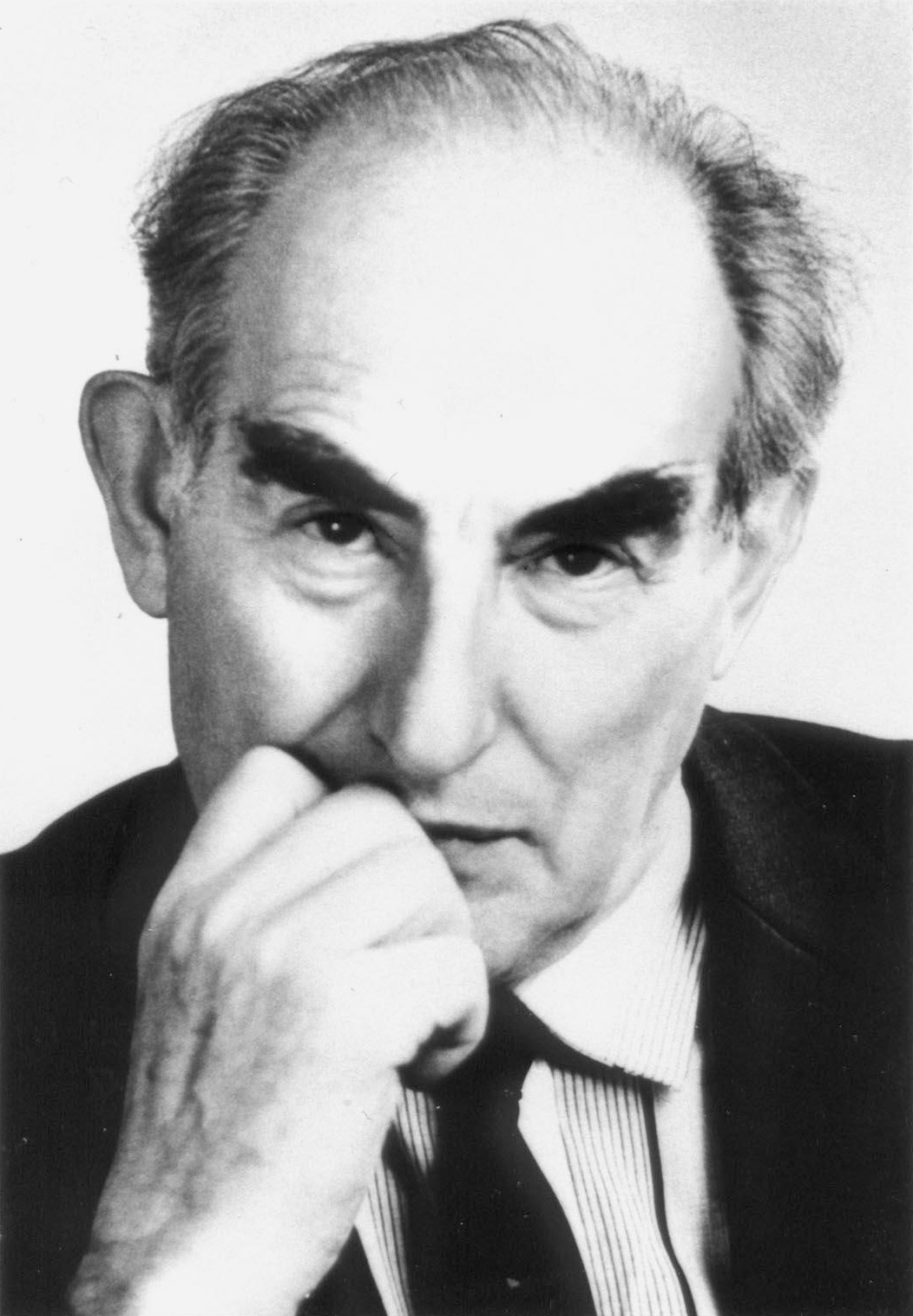
Vitaly Ginzburg

- Alexey Abrikosov, MS 1948 – Soviet-Russian-American physicist; Nobel Prize in Physics (2003)
- Ilya Frank – professor of physics; Nobel Prize in Physics (1958)
- Vitaly Ginzburg, MS 1938, PhD 1942 – physicist; Nobel Prize in Physics (2003)
- Mikhail Gorbachev, MA 1955 – Head of State of the Soviet Union; Nobel Peace Prize (1990)
- Pyotr Kapitsa – professor of physics; Nobel Prize in Physics (1978)
- Lev Landau – professor of physics; Nobel Prize in Physics (1962)
- Boris Pasternak, MA 1913 – writer, Nobel Prize in Literature (1958)
- Alexander Prokhorov – Australian-Soviet-Russian professor of physics; Nobel Prize in Physics (1964)
- Andrei Sakharov, MS 1942 – nuclear physicist; Nobel Peace Prize (1975)
- Nikolay Semyonov – professor of chemistry; Nobel Prize in Chemistry (1956)
- Igor Tamm, MS 1918 – physicist; Nobel Prize in Physics (1958)

=== Fields Medal laureates ===
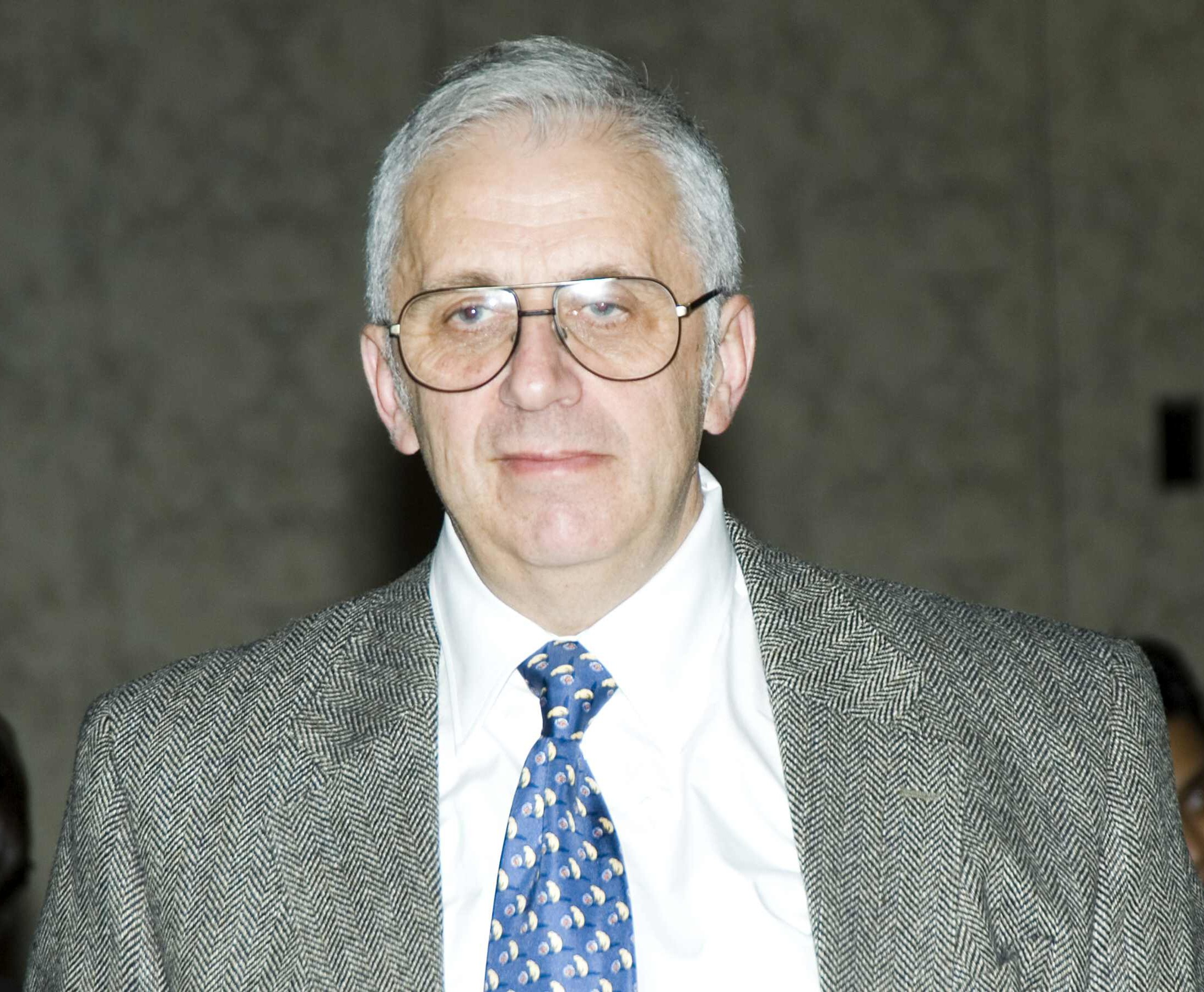
Grigory Margulis

- Vladimir Drinfeld (attended 1969–1974) – Soviet-American mathematician; Fields Medal (1990); Harry Pratt Judson Distinguished Service Professor at the University of Chicago
- Maxim Kontsevich (attended 1980–1985) – Russian-French mathematician; Fields Medal (1998)
- Grigory Margulis, PhD 1970 – Russian-American mathematician; Erastus L. De Forest Professor of Mathematics at Yale University; Fields Medal (1978)
- Sergei Novikov, BA 1960 – mathematician; Fields Medal (1970)
- Andrei Okounkov, PhD 1995 – mathematician; Fields Medal (2006); Professor of Mathematics at Princeton University
- Vladimir Voevodsky (attended 1982) – Russian-American mathematician

=== Turing Award laureates ===
- C. A. R. Hoare (attended as graduate student) – British computer scientist; Turing Award (1980)

== Literature, journalism and philosophy ==
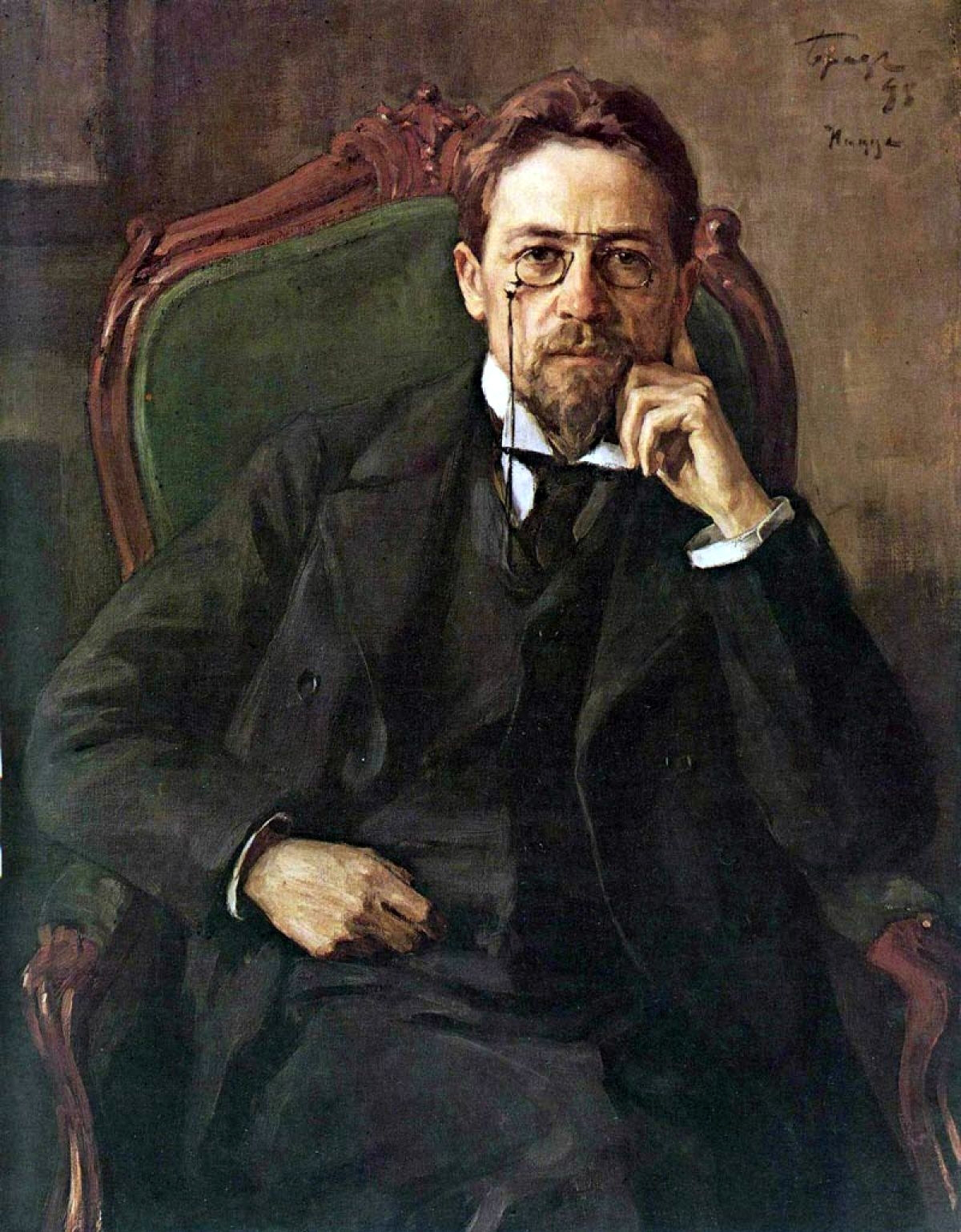
Anton Chekhov, writer

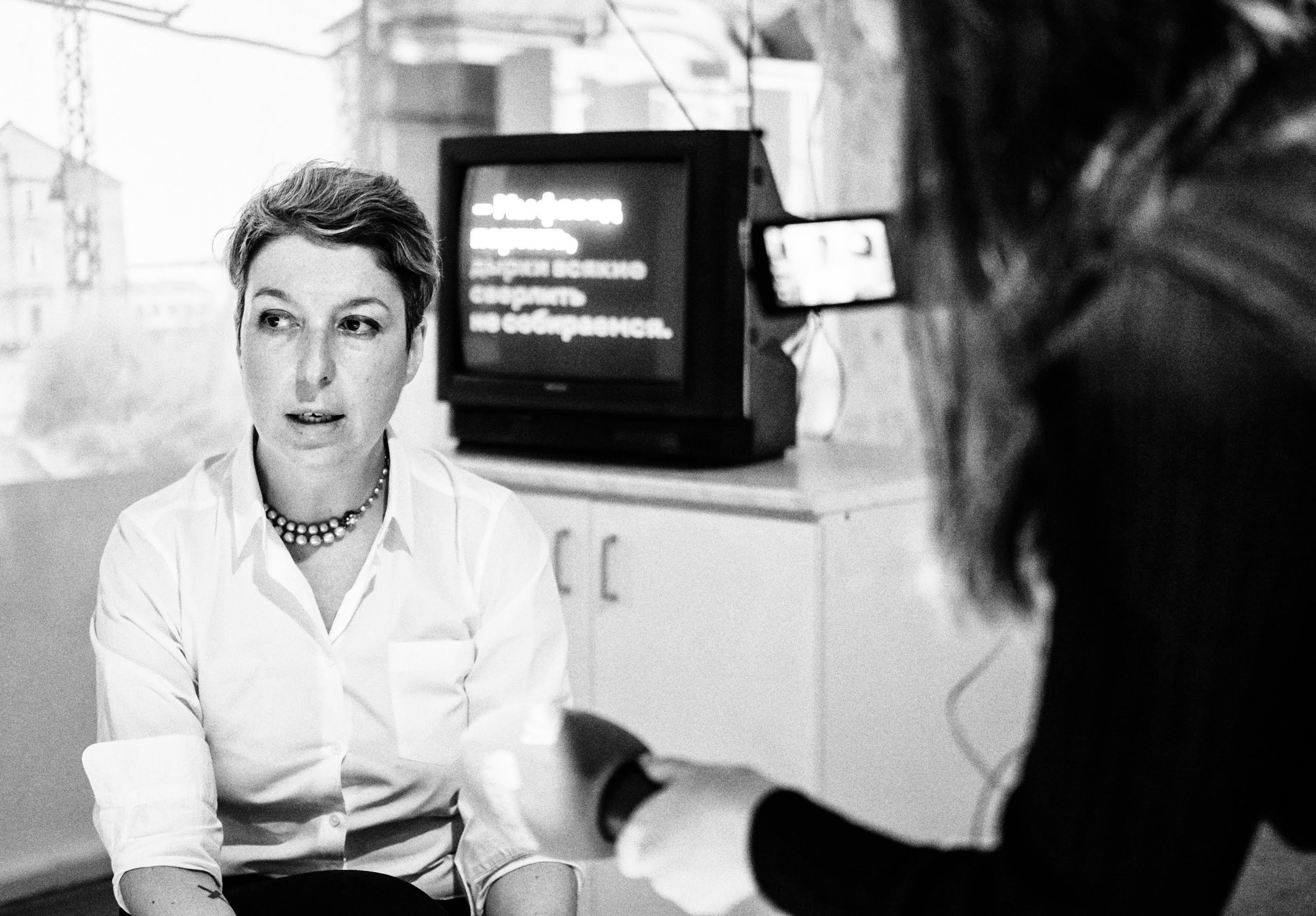
Anna Narinskaya

- Alexander Boot – lecturer on English literature who became a journalist and author in London
- Sergei Bulgakov – Russian Orthodox theologian, philosopher and economist
- Dmitry Bykov (born 1967), writer, poet, literary critic, and journalist.
- Pyotr Chaadaev – philosopher
- Boris Chicherin – jurist and political philosopher
- Anton Chekhov – short story writer and playwright
- Ekaterina Dashkova – major figure of the Russian Enlightenment
- Semyon Desnitsky – lawyer; introduced the ideas of Adam Smith to the Russian public
- Pavel Florensky – philosopher, Russian Orthodox theologian, historian
- Alexander Griboedov – writer, diplomat
- Vasily Grossman (1905–1964), writer and journalist
- Yelena Khanga – journalist, writer, talk show host
- Edward Kuznetsov – Soviet-Israeli dissident, refusenik, journalist, and writer
- Sofokli Lazri – Albanian journalist and diplomat
- Mikhail Lermontov – poet, writer
- Uliana Malashenko – journalist
- Merab Mamardashvili – philosopher
- Musa Muradov – journalist
- Anna Narinskaya – journalist, literary critic, and exhibition curator
- Nitipoom Navaratna – columnist
- Alpesh Patel – philosopher
- Aleksey Pisemsky – novelist and dramatist
- Anna Politkovskaya – journalist, human rights activist
- Vasily Rozanov – writer and philosopher
- Elena Rzhevskaya – writer and war interpreter
- Elena Seifert – poet, translator, literary critic, and journalist
- Varlam Shalamov – writer, author of books on Soviet labor camps
- Dmitry Strelnikoff – poet, essayist, novelist
- Mikhail Svetlov – poet
- Vladimir Toporov – philologist
- Nikolai Trubetzkoy – linguist and historian
- Ivan Turgenev – writer
- Lyudmila Ulitskaya – novelist and short-story writer, Austrian State Prize for European Literature
- Maximilian Voloshin – poet

== Academics ==
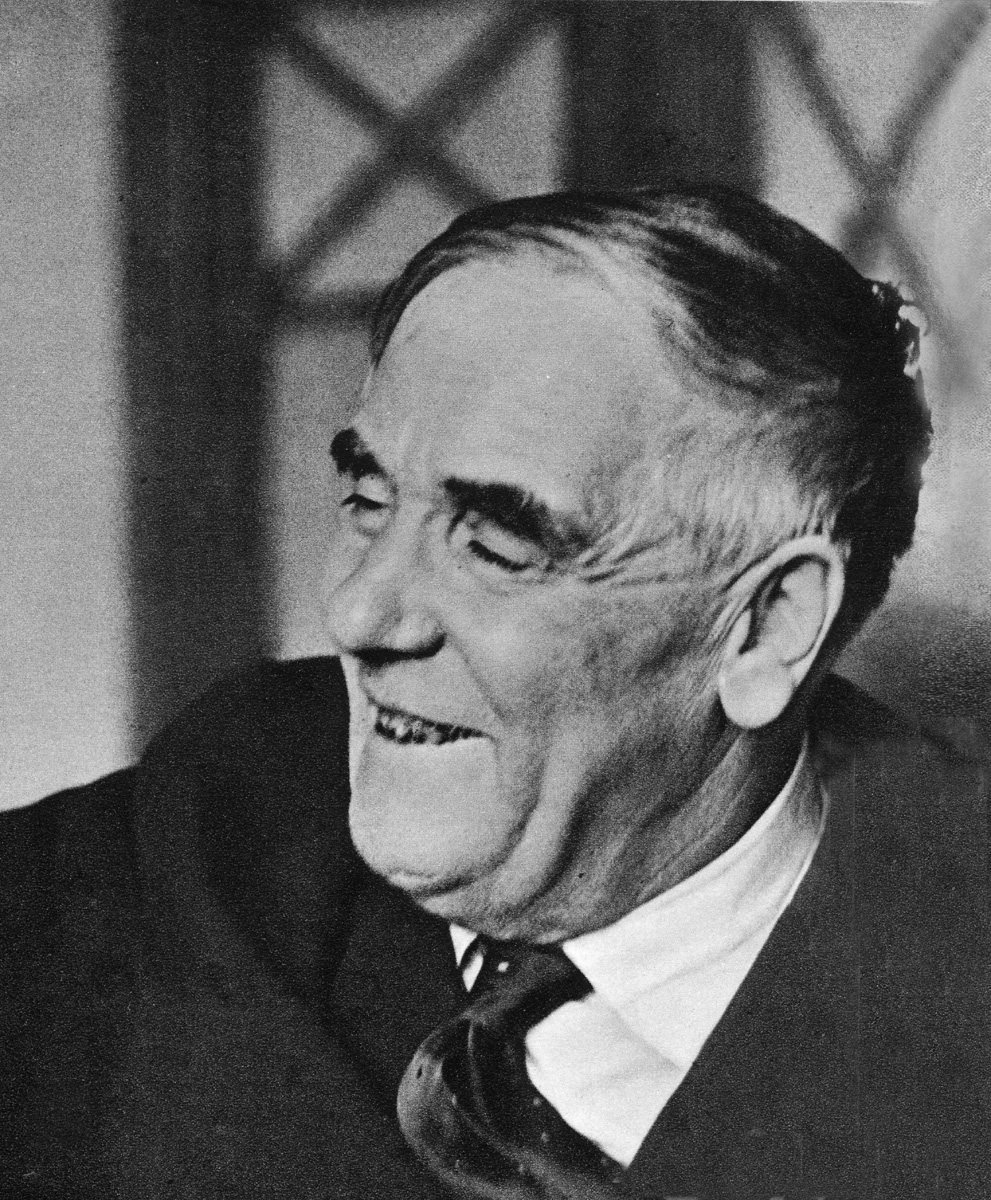
Pyotr Kapitsa, physicist and engineer

=== Astronomy ===
- Alexander Salomonovich – radio astronomer
- Iosif Shklovsky (1916– 1985) – astronomer and astrophysicist.

=== Chemistry ===
- Alexei Bogdanov – chemist and molecular biologist
- Nguyen Dinh Duc – researcher of composite materials in Vietnam
- Nikolay Emanuel – specialist in chemical kinetics and mechanics of chemical reactions
- Alexei Kharitonenkov – Russian-American biochemist and medical researcher
- Aleksandr Oparin – biochemist
- Natalia Shustova – professor of chemistry
- Nikolay Semyonov – professor of chemistry; Nobel Prize in Chemistry 1956

=== Computer science ===
- Georgy Adelson-Velsky – Soviet-Israeli inventor of AVL tree algorithm; developer of Kaissa (the first World Computer Chess Champion)
- C. A. R. Hoare – British computer scientist; winner of Turing Award in 1980
- Lam M. Nguyen – Vietnamese-American computer scientist and applied mathematician; research scientist at IBM Research
- Alexander Stepanov – Russian-American; known for C++ Standard Template Library

=== Economics ===
- Sergey Glazyev – economist, politician
- Avraham Katznelson – physician and Zionist political figure
- Yuri Maltsev – Austrian School economist

=== Engineering ===
- Klaudia Sergejewna Kildisheva (1917–1994) – aviation engineer and H ero of Socialist Labor
- Victor Lyatkher (1933) – renewable energy engineer

=== Geosciences ===
- Boris Fedtschenko – botanist
- Naomi Feinbrun-Dothan – Russian-Israeli botanist
- Alexander Goldfarb – Russian-American microbiologist, activist, and author
- Grigori Gamburtsev – seismologist
- Grigorii Kozhevnikov – entomologist
- Boris Kozo-Polyansky – botanist and evolutionary biologist
- Irina Pavlovna Zarutskaya – geomorphologist, cartographer

=== History ===
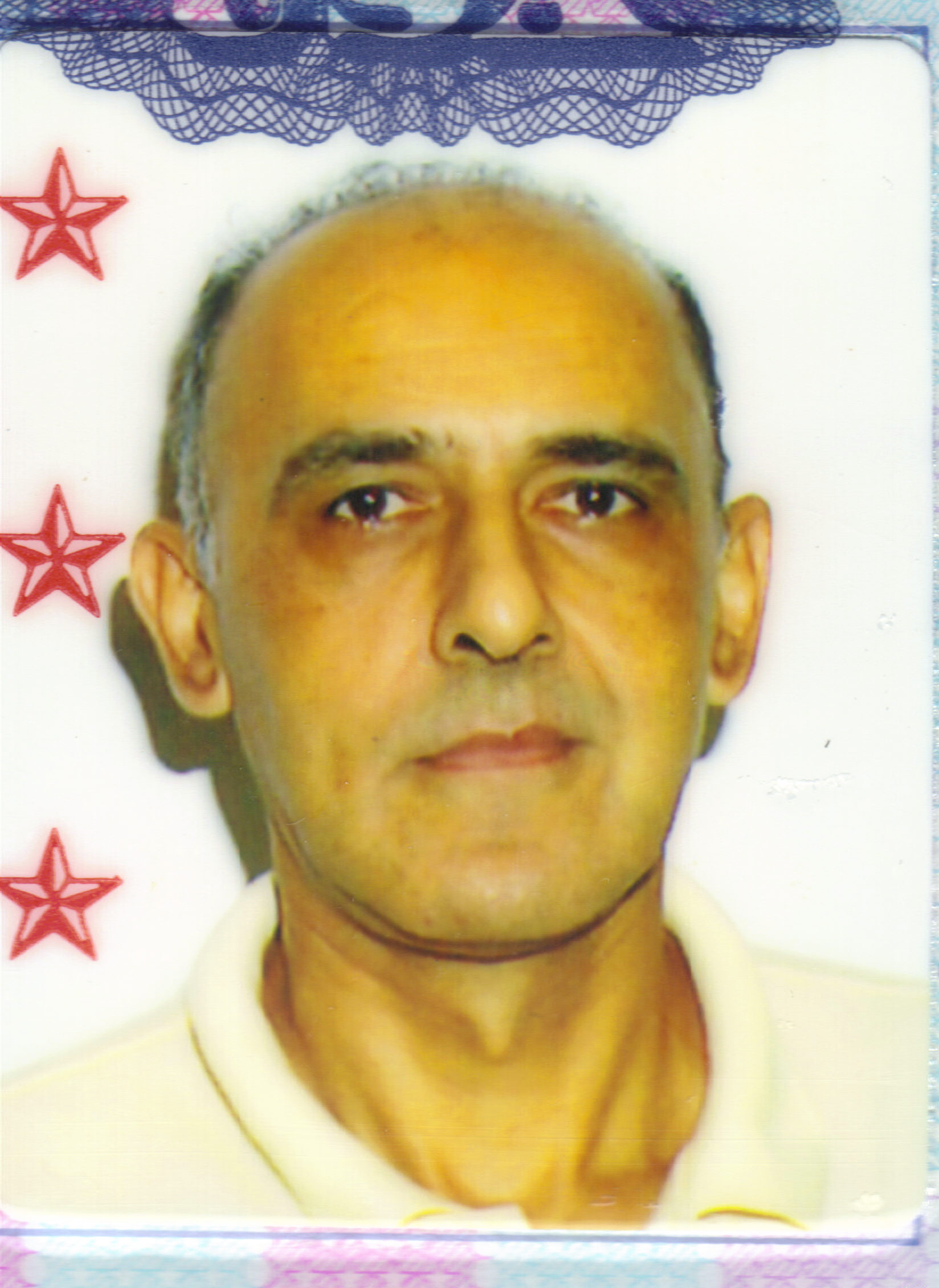
Alec Rasizade

- Suleyman Aliyarli – Azeri historian and Turkologist
- Zalpa Bersanova – Chechen ethnographer and author
- Anatoly Bokschanin – historian of Rome, professor
- Igor Golomstock – art historian
- Vladimir Guerrier – historian and founder of higher education for women in Russia
- Anatoly Khazanov – anthropologist and historian
- Vasily Klyuchevsky – historian
- Nikolay Kun – historian, writer and educator
- V. S. Lelchuk – historian
- Nikolai Mashkin – historian of Rome, professor
- Sigurd Schmidt – historian, ethnographer
- Pavel Polian – geographer and historian
- Alec Rasizade – professor of history and political science, author of Rasizade's algorithm
- Konstantin Zel'in – historian

=== Law ===
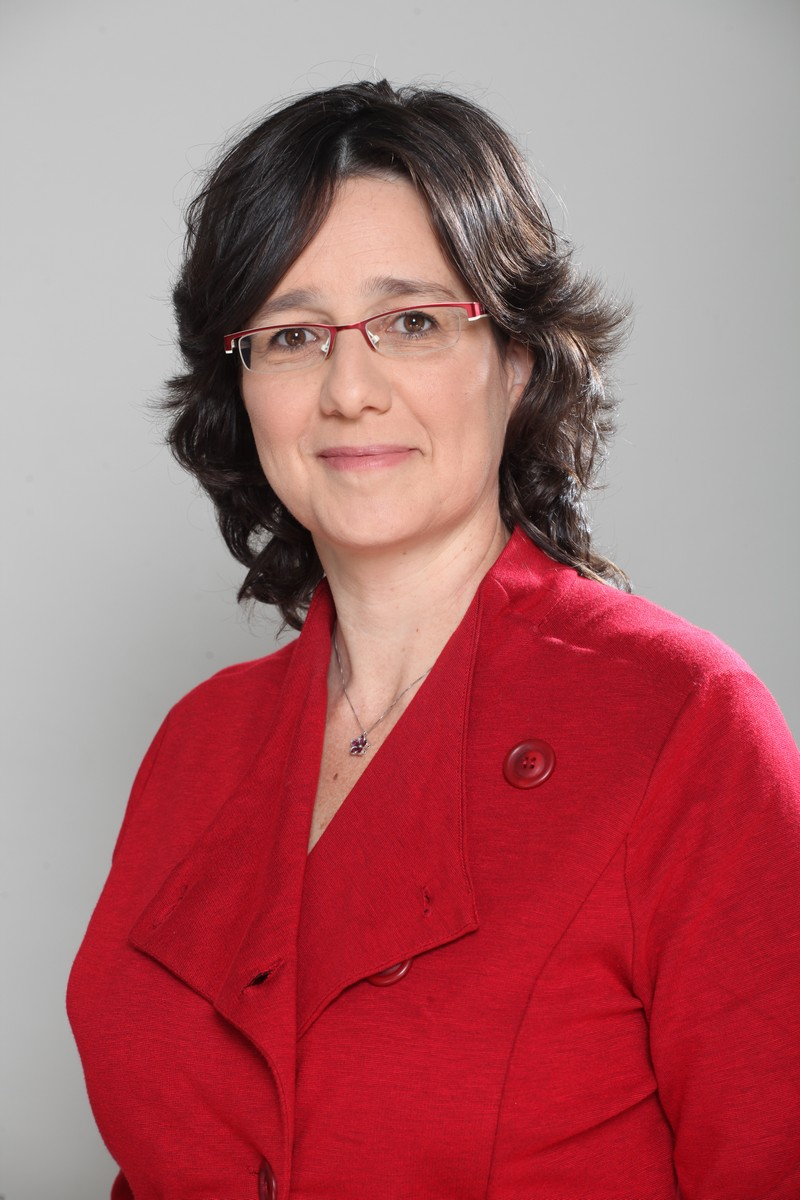
Daphna Hacker

- Daphna Hacker – professor at the Tel Aviv University law faculty
- Tatiana Vladislavovna Petrova – environmental law lecturer
- Anatoly Shesteryuk – environmental law and land law professor

=== Linguistics and philology ===
- Victor Bayda – linguist
- Alexander Dolin – Japanologist, author, translator, academic
- Ahmet Cevat Emre – Turkish linguist
- Elena Fedorova – philologist
- Margalit Finkelberg – Belarusian-Israeli historian and linguist
- Vyacheslav Ivanov – philologist
- Yuri Knorozov – Russian linguist, epigrapher and ethnographer
- Anatoly Moskvin – academic and linguist; arrested in 2011 after the bodies of twenty-six mummified young women were discovered in his home
- Victor Raskin – distinguished professor of linguistics at Purdue University

=== Mathematics ===
==== A–K ====
- Pavel Alexandrov – mathematician
- Vladimir Arnold – mathematician, Shaw Prize (2008), State Prize of the Russian Federation (2007), Wolf Prize (2001), Dannie Heineman Prize for Mathematical Physics, Harvey Prize (1994), RAS Lobachevsky Prize (1992), Crafoord Prize (1982), Lenin Prize (1965)
- Hafez Bashar al-Assad (2023) – son of Syrian authoritarian ruler Bashar al-Assad
- Grigory Barenblatt – mathematician, Timoshenko Medal (2005)
- Alexander Beilinson (born 1957) – mathematician
- Felix Berezin – mathematician and physicist
- Joseph Bernstein – Israeli mathematician, Israel Prize (2004)
- Vladimir Boltyansky – mathematician, educator, and author
- Pafnuty Chebyshev – mathematician
- Boris Demidovich – mathematician
- Vladimir Drinfeld – Soviet-American mathematician; winner of the Fields Medal 1990
- Eugene Dynkin – Soviet-American mathematician, Leroy P. Steele Prize (1993)
- Messoud Efendiev – mathematician
- Gregory Eskin – Russian-Israeli-American mathematician
- Dmitry Fuchs – Russian-American mathematician
- Israel Gelfand – Soviet-American mathematician
- Alexander Gelfond (1906–1968) – mathematician
- Victor Ginzburg – Russian-American mathematician
- Gu Chaohao – Chinese mathematician
- Svetlana Jitomirskaya (born 1966) – mathematician working on dynamical systems and mathematical physics
- Anatole Katok – American mathematician
- David Kazhdan (born 1946) – Soviet-Israeli mathematician; known for work in representation theory; MacArthur Fellow
- Mstislav Keldysh – mathematician; president of the USSR Academy of Sciences, 1961–1975
- Tanya Khovanova – Soviet-American mathematician
- Faina Mihajlovna Kirillova – mathematician and control theorist
- Andrey Kolmogorov – mathematician
- Maxim Kontsevich – Russian-French mathematician; winner of the Fields Medal in 1998
- Boris Korenblum – Soviet-Israeli-American mathematician

==== L–Z ====
- Grigory Landsberg – physicist, Order of Lenin
- Leonid Levin – Soviet-American mathematician and computer scientist
- Vladimir Levenshtein – mathematician
- Boris Levit – mathematician
- Nikolai Luzin – mathematician
- Grigory Margulis – Russian-American mathematician; winner of the Fields Medal 1978
- Sergei Novikov – mathematician; winner of the Fields Medal in 1970
- Andrei Okounkov – mathematician; winner of the Fields Medal in 2006
- Olga Oleinik – mathematician
- Alexander Moiseevich Olevskii – Russian-Israeli mathematician
- Ivan Petrovsky – mathematician
- Ilya Piatetski-Shapiro (1929–2009) – Soviet-Israeli mathematician
- Abraham Plessner – mathematician
- Leonid Polterovich – Russian-Israeli mathematician, 1998 Erdős Prize, 1996 EMS Prize
- Vladimir Rokhlin – mathematician
- Yakov Sinai – Russian-American mathematician
- Ilya M. Sobol – mathematician
- Bella Subbotovskaya (1937–1982) – mathematician
- Hoang Tuy – Vietnamese mathematician
- Ernest Vinberg – mathematician; recipient, Humboldt Prize

=== Paleontology ===
- Alexei Petrovich Pavlov - paleontologist and geologist
- Maria Vasillievna Pavlova - paleontologist

=== Pedagogy ===
- Alexander Bogomolny – Israeli-American mathematician; creator of the mathematical education website "Cut-the-Knot"
- Victor Della-Vos

=== Physics ===
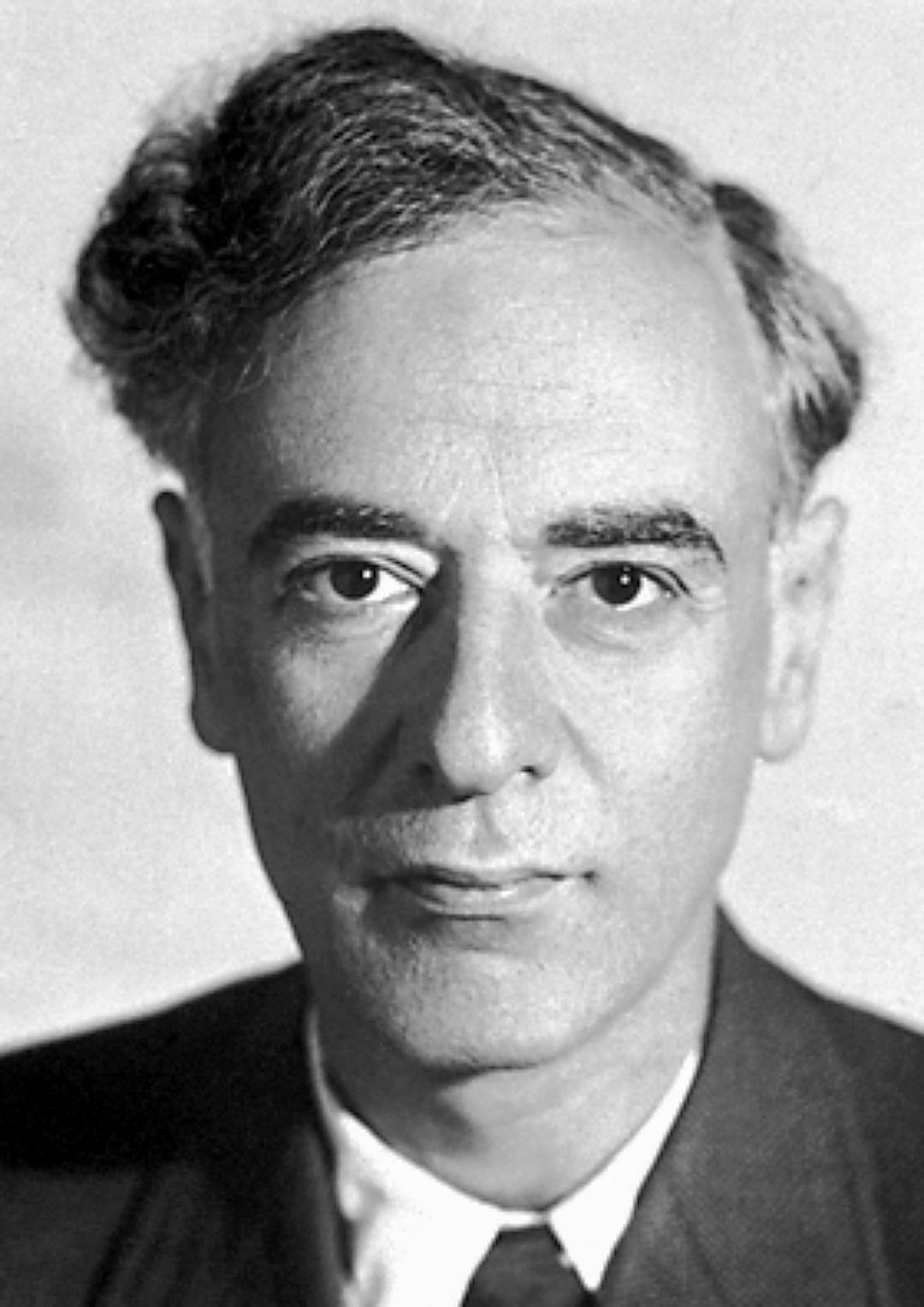
Lev Landau

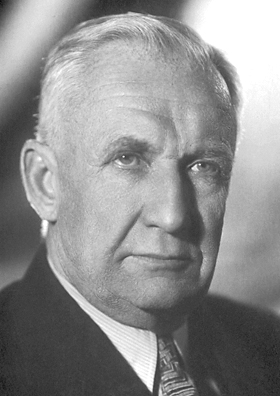
Igor Tamm

- Alexey Abrikosov – Soviet-Russian-American physicist; laureate, 2003 Nobel Prize in Physics
- Nikolay Bogolyubov – theoretical physicist and mathematician
- Gersh Budker (1918–1977) – physicist; specialized in nuclear physics and accelerator physics
- Fidel Castro Díaz-Balart – nuclear physicist
- Paul Epstein – Russian-American mathematical physicist
- Ilya Frank – professor of physics; laureate, 1958 Nobel Prize in Physics
- Vitaly Ginzburg – physicist; laureate, 2003 Nobel Prize in Physics
- Sergey Gavrilets – mathematical biologist
- Pyotr Kapitsa – professor of physics; laureate, 1978 Nobel Prize in Physics
- Lev Landau – professor of physics; laureate, 1962 Nobel Prize in Physics
- Eugene Levich – Russian-Israeli physicist
- Andrei Linde – Russian-American physicist
- Alexander Prokhorov – professor of physics; laureate, 1964 Nobel Prize in Physics
- Andrei Sakharov – nuclear physicist; laureate, 1975 Nobel Peace Prize
- Dmitry Shirkov – theoretical physicist
- Arsenij Sokolov – theoretical physicist
- Igor Tamm – physicist; laureate, 1958 Nobel Prize in Physics
- Igor Ternov – theoretical physicist
- Sergei Tyablikov – theoretical physicist
- Anatoly Vlasov – physicist
- Akiva Moiseevich Yaglom – physicist, mathematician, statistician, and meteorologist
- Michael Zhdanov – geophysicist
- Dmitry Zubarev – theoretical physicist

=== Psychology ===
- Alexander Luria (1902–1977) – neuropsychologist
- Georgy Shchedrovitsky
- Lev Semenovich Vygotsky – psychologist

=== Sociology ===
- Alexander Bikbov – sociologist and political scientist
- Georgi Derluguian – sociologist
- Yuri Levada – sociologist

== Other ==
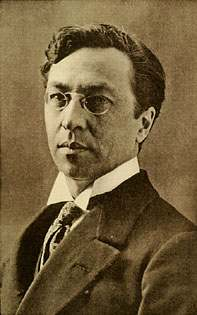
Wassily Kandinsky, painter and art theorist

=== Business and finance ===
- Pyotr Aven
- Oleg Deripaska
- Andrey Melnichenko – billionaire; founder and chairman of EuroChem
- Margarita Louis-Dreyfus – Russian-born French billionaire; chairman of Louis Dreyfus
- Elena Kotova
- Alexander Mamut (born 1960) – Russian-Israeli lawyer, banker, and investor
- Yuri Milner (born 1961) – Soviet-born Israeli entrepreneur, investor, physicist, and scientist.
- Denis Morozov – entrepreneur
- Irina Nevzlin – Israeli entrepreneur and writer
- Oleg Vyugin – former head of the Federal Financial Markets Service

=== Musicians and actors ===
- Nipun Akter – actress
- Sergei Bodrov, Jr. – actor
- Nashenas – Afghan musician
- Natalia O'Shea – singer-songwriter
- Alla Yoshpe – singer
- Elena Zoubareva – opera singer
- Elena Katina – singer

=== Politics ===
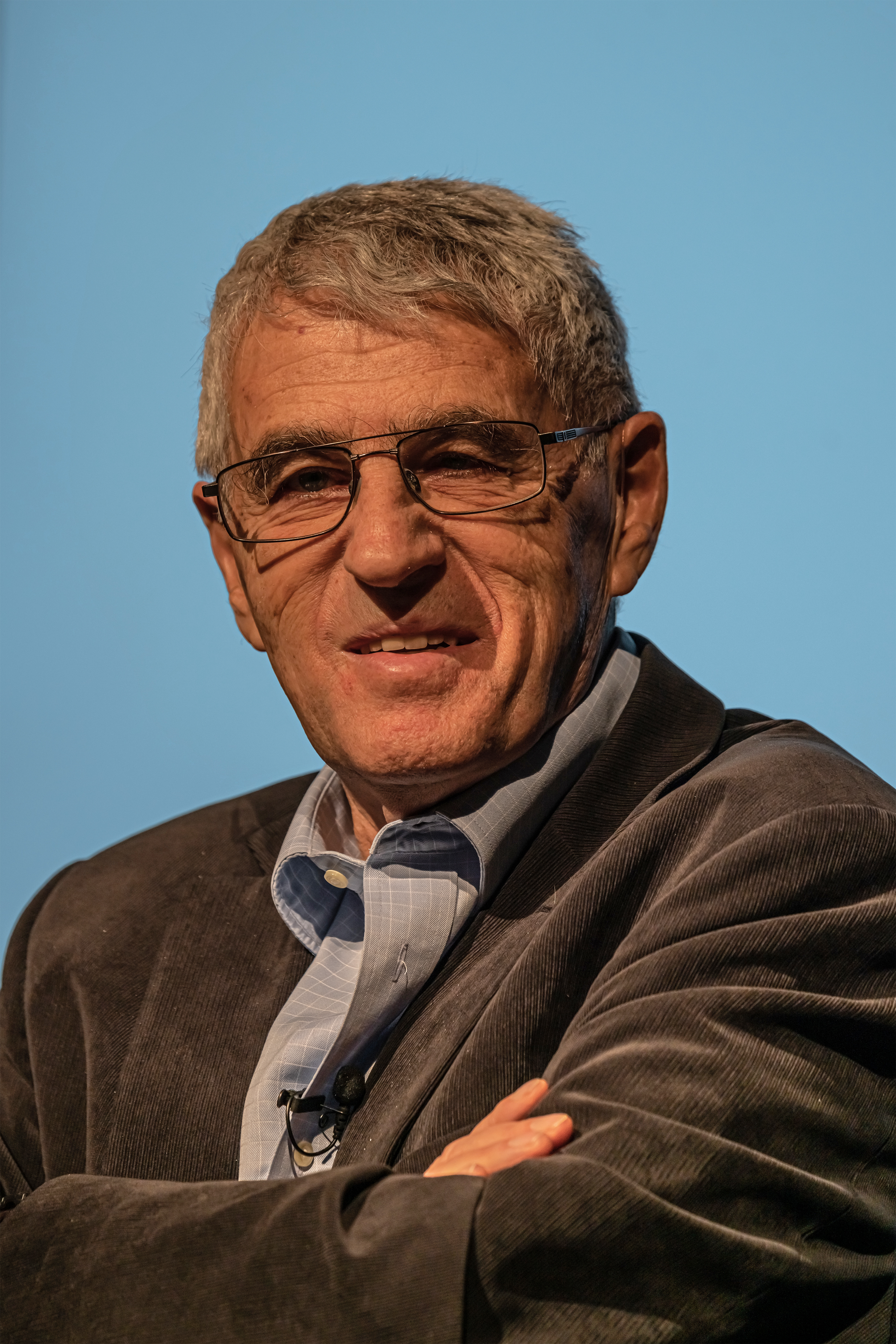
Leonid Gozman

- Leonid Gozman – politician and president of the Union of Right Forces
- Lev Kamenev (né Rozenfeld; 1883–1936) – Russian revolutionary and Soviet politician.
- Ivan Laluha (1932–2025) – Slovak politician
- Michael Novakhov (born 1975) – American radio station founder and host, and member of the New York State Assembly
- Marina Solodkin – Israeli politician
- Vladislav Stashinsky – deputy of the State Duma of the 2nd convocation, first minister of internal affairs of Lithuania in 1918, and director of the Bank of Lithuania
- Araik Tunyan – member of the Constitutional Court of Armenia
- Aun Pornmoniroth – deputy prime minister of Cambodia

=== Religion ===
- ʻAlí-Akbar Furútan – Hand of the Cause of the Baháʼí Faith

=== Sports ===
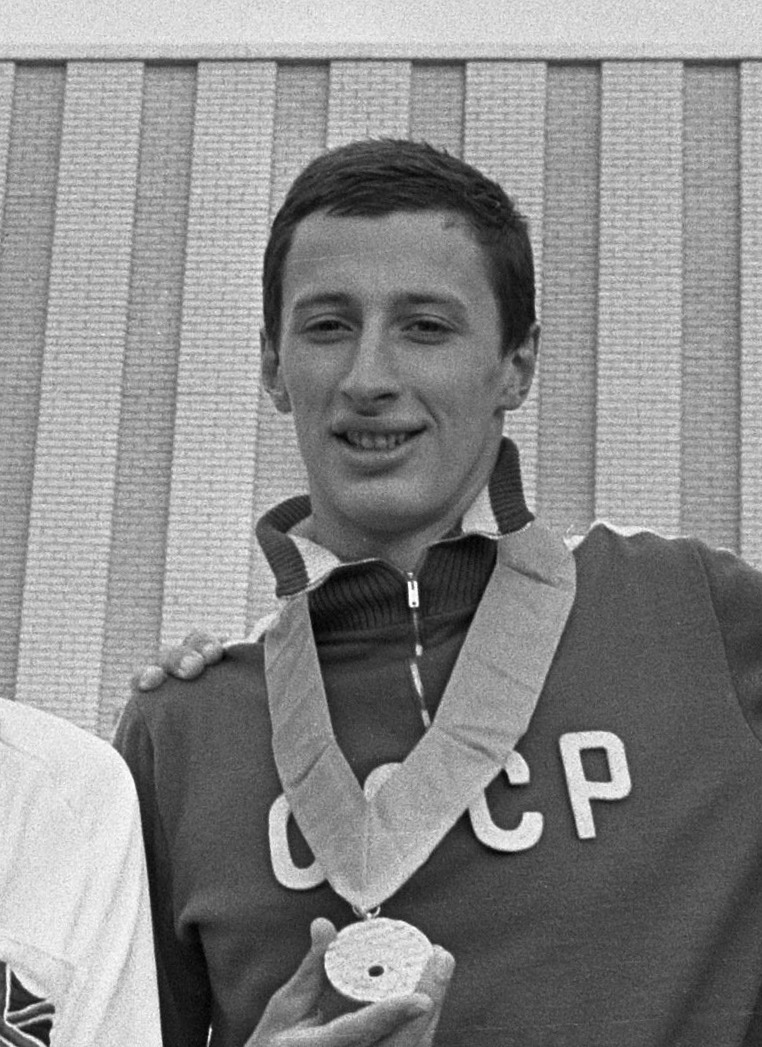
Semyon Belits-Geiman

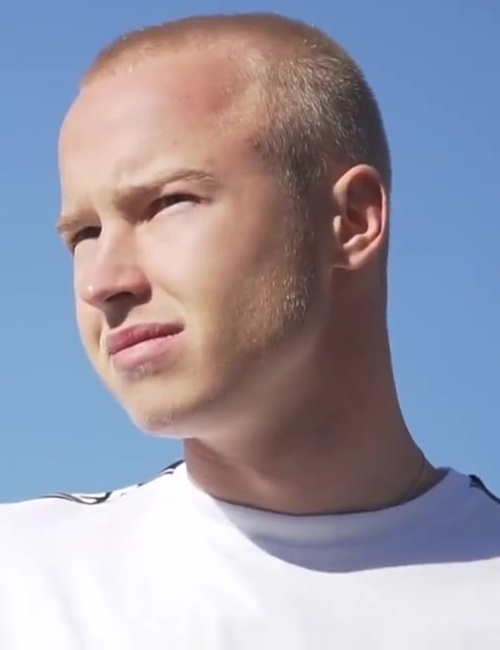
Nikita Mazepin

- Semyon Belits-Geiman – swimmer, world-record holder and two-time Olympic medalist
- Marina Granovskaia – director at Chelsea F.C.
- Nikita Mazepin – former Formula 1 driver of Team Haas F1
- Nikolai Melnikov – Olympic champion water polo player
- Mikhail Romm – football player and memoirist
- Alexandra Trusova – figur¹e skater and 2022 Olympic silver medalist

=== Visual arts ===
- Anna Alchuk – poet and visual artist
- Wassily Kandinsky – painter, printmaker and art theorist
- Vsevolod Meyerhold – theatre director and producer
- Ernst Neizvestny – sculptor, painter, graphic artist, and art philosopher
- Vladimir Nemirovich-Danchenko – theatre director, writer
- Leonid Pasternak – post-impressionist painter
- Vsevolod Pudovkin – film director
- Yuli Raizman – film director and screenwriter
- Yulia Spiridonova – photographer

=== Video games ===
- Vadim Gerasimov – co-developer of the puzzle video game Tetris

=== Automobiles ===
- Misha Charoudin – test driver, automotive influencer, social media personality

== See also ==
- Category:Moscow State University alumni
- Education in Moscow
- Lists of schools
