= Malashenko =

Malashenko (Малашенко) is a surname. Notable people with the surname include:

- Aleksey Malashenko (1951–2023), Russian academic and political scientist
- Dmitriy Malashenko (born 1984), Ukrainian actor
- Elizaveta Malashenko (born 1996), Russian handballer
- Igor Malashenko (1954–2019), Russian political scientist and journalist
- Olesia Malashenko (born 1991), Russian basketball player
- Uliana Malashenko, Russian journalist
- Viktor Malashenko (born 1995), Russian politician
- Yevgeny Malashenko (1924–2017) Soviet colonel and acting chief of staff of the Special Corps during Hungarian Revolution of 1956
