= Vasily Kuzishchin =

Soviet academic

- Born: 1 November 1930; Pokrovskoye
- Died: 28 February 2013 (aged 82); Moscow
- Occupation: Classical scholar

Vasily Ivanovich Kuzishchin (Russian: Василий Иванович Кузищин; 1930 - 2013) was a Soviet Russian historian, Doctor of Sciences in Historical Sciences (1966), Distinguished Professor at the Lomonosov Moscow State University (1996).

He graduated from the Faculty of History at Lomonosov Moscow State University in 1953. He was a student of Anatoly Bokschanin.

In 1969, he received the title of Professor. From 1973 to 2009, Kuzishchin headed the Department of History of the Ancient World.

Kuzishchin is an author more than 220 scientific works. He published in Journal of Ancient History.
