= Tadeusz Swietochowski =

Polish-American historian and Caucasologist

- Tadeusz Świętochowski
- Born: 28 April 1932; Lille, France
- Died: 15 February 2017 (aged 84); New York City, U.S.
- Citizenship: United States / Poland
- Education: University of Warsaw; Columbia University
- Known for: History of Azerbaijan
- Spouse: Marie (Mimi) Lukens
- Scientific career
- Fields: Modern history
- Workplaces: Monmouth University
- Thesis: Azerbaijan in 1905-1920
- Doctoral advisor: Edward A. Allworth
- Notable students: Alec Rasizade

Tadeusz Świętochowski (Polish: [taˈdɛ.uʂ ɕfjɛntɔˈxɔfskʲi]; 28 April 1932 – 15 February 2017) was a Polish-American historian and Caucasologist, Professor Emeritus of Columbia University and Monmouth University.

== Biography ==
Świętochowski was born in France into a family of Polish diplomat Stanisław Świętochowski, who died in the USSR, probably in Butyrka prison. After graduating with a degree in Turkish studies from the University of Warsaw, he left Poland for the Middle East, where he earned his MA in Arab Studies at the American University of Beirut, and later studied Arab History at the Cairo University. In 1965, he moved with his wife Marie Lukens, whom he met in Istanbul, to New York, where he received a PhD degree from the New York University.

Tadeusz Swietochowski was a Professor of Soviet and Middle East Studies at Monmouth University, New Jersey. He was a fellow at the Kennan Institute, Washington, D.C., and a Senior Fellow at the Harriman Institute, Columbia University.

Swietochowski was a specialist on the modern history of Azerbaijan. He was an Honorary Doctor of Khazar University and Baku State University and Honorary Member of Central Eurasian Studies Society. His fields of study included the modern history of the Middle East and Azerbaijan.

He also lectured at the Warsaw University as Fulbright Senior Specialist.

== Selected works ==
- Poland between Germany and Russia (1926-1939): the theory of two enemies. (Edited by Alexander Korczyński & Tadeusz Świętochowski). Pilsudski Institute of America, New York, 1975.
- Guide to the collections of the Pilsudski Institute of America for research in the modern history of Poland. Pilsudski Institute of America, New York, 1980.
- Russian Azerbaijan (1905-1920): the shaping of a national identity in a Muslim community. Cambridge University Press, Boston, 1985, 272 pages. (Translated into Turkish: Müslüman Cemaatten Ulusal Kimliğe Rus Azerbaycanı, 1905-1920. Istanbul, Bağlam Yayınları, 1988).
- Karol Wędziagolski. Boris Savinkov: portrait of a terrorist. (Edited by Tadeusz Swietochowski, translated by Margaret Patoski). Kingston Press, Clifton NJ, 1988.
- Der Islam und die Entwicklung nationaler Identität in Aserbaidschan. Markus Verlag-Gesellschaft, Köln, 1989.
- Russia and Azerbaijan: a borderland in transition. Columbia University Press, New York, 1995, 289 pages. (Translated into Azeri: Rusiya və Azərbaycan: dəyişən sərhədlər. Khazar University Press, Baku, 2000).
- Azerbejdżan i Rosja: kolonializm, islam i narodowość w podzielonym kraju. Instytut Studiów Politycznych Polskiej Akademii Nauk, Warszawa, 1998, 302 str.
- Historical Dictionary of Azerbaijan (co-author). Scarecrow Press, Lanham MD, 1999, 130 pages.
- Azerbaijan: the hidden faces of Islam. = World Policy Journal (New York), Fall 2002, volume XIX, number 3, pages 69-76.
- Azerbejdżan. Wydawnictwo Trio, Warszawa, 2006, 303 str.
