= Natalia Shustova =

American chemist

Natalia B. Shustova
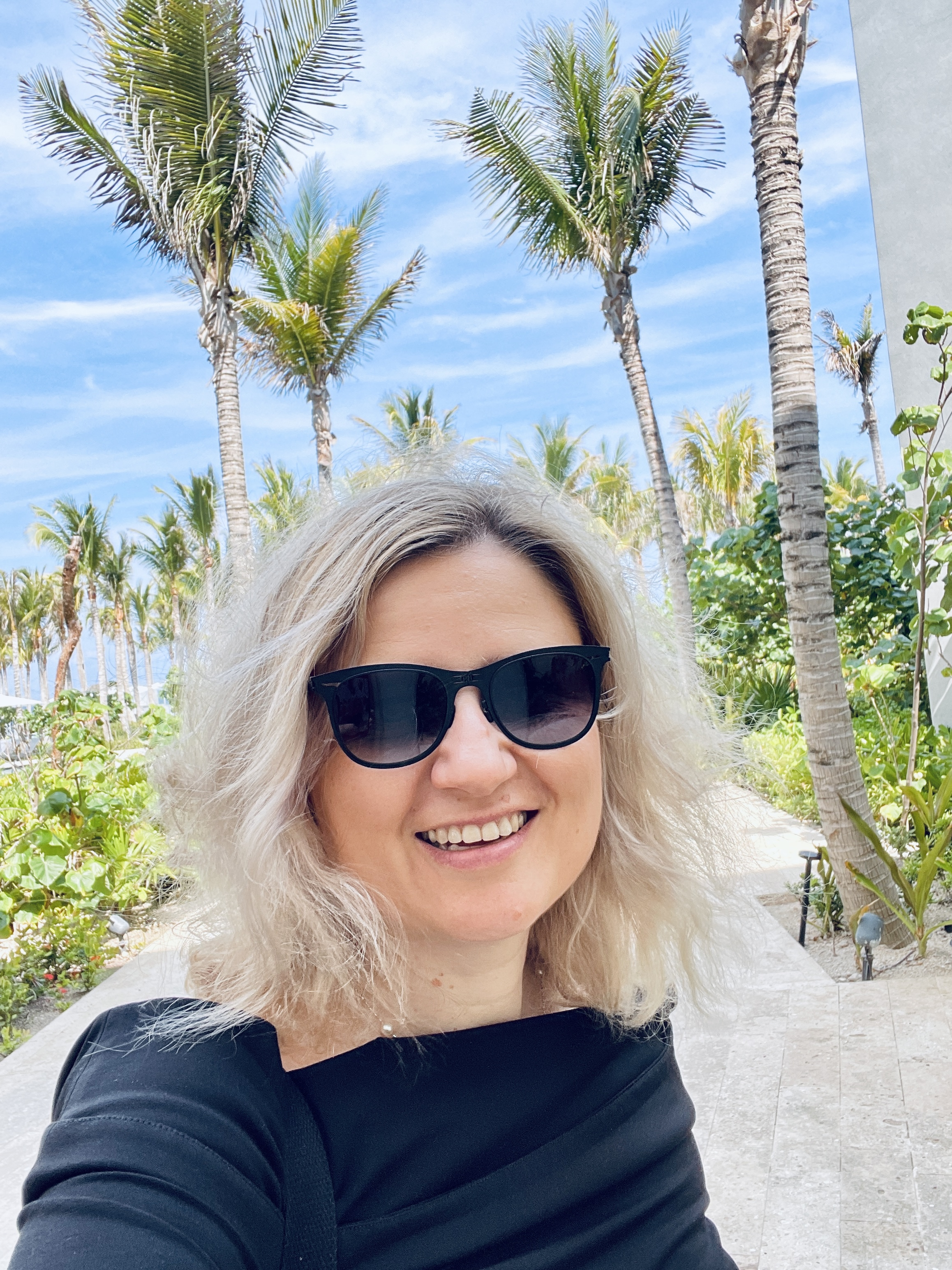
- Education: Colorado State University; Moscow State University
- Scientific career
- Workplaces: University of South Carolina; Massachusetts Institute of Technology
- Thesis: Fluorine-containing fullerenes and endometallofullerenes: Synthesis, structure, and spectroscopic characterization (2010)
- Doctoral advisor: Olga V. Boltalina, Steven H. Strauss
- Other academic advisors: Mircea Dincă

Natalia B. Shustova is a Fred M. Weissman Palmetto Professor of Chemistry at the University of South Carolina. She focuses on developing materials for sustainable energy conversion, metal-organic frameworks (MOFs), covalent organic frameworks (COFs), and graphitic supramolecular structures.

== Education and career ==
Shustova received her M.S. degree in Materials Science from Moscow State University (MSU) in 2004 and two Ph.D. degrees in Physical Chemistry (MSU) and Inorganic Chemistry (Colorado State University) in 2005 and 2010, respectively. She then completed postdoctoral research at the Massachusetts Institute of Technology in 2013.

Shustova started her career as an assistant professor at the University of South Carolina (USC) in 2013. In four years, she was promoted to Associate Professor and two years later became a Full Professor at the Department of Chemistry and Biochemistry, USC. Currently, Shustova is the Fred M. Weissman Palmetto Professor of Chemistry at USC.

Shustova has received the National Science Foundation CAREER Award, USC Breakthrough Scholar Award, Cottrell Scholar Award, the McCausland Fellowship, the Alfred P. Sloan Research Award, TUM-IAS Hans Fischer Fellowship, and the Camille Dreyfus Teacher-Scholar Award. She has also served as an Associate Editor at the RSC journal.

Shustova was recently named a Scialog Fellow of the Research Corporation for Science Advancement.

Shustova currently serves as an associate editor for ACS Materials Letters and as a member of Cottrell Scholar Selection Committee.

== Research ==
Work in her research group is multifaceted, utilizing metal-organic frameworks (MOFs), covalent-organic frameworks (COFs), and graphitic hybrid structures to design materials for sustainable energy conversion, as stimuli-responsive sensors and switches, and for nuclear waste sequestration. Shustova is interested in achieving greater morphological control in the active layer of bulk heterojunction solar cells through the design of novel donor-acceptor frameworks. Her work has integrated fulleretic accepting molecules, such as π‐bowls or π‐balls, to tune electronic properties, achieving semiconductive behavior in normally insulating materials. For example, Shustova achieved an eight-fold conductivity enhancement as compared to the parent COF by installing fullerene, a strong electron acceptor, within COF pores.

Shustova has also attempted to design artificial photosynthetic scaffolds for light harvesting. In one case, Shustova and her group utilized a MOF in a multifunctional system for efficient chromophore coupling, facilitating highly efficient energy transfer mimicking the protein beta-barrel structure. Some of the group's earlier work established structure-property relationships in heterometallic MOFs to target on-demand electronic properties within extended heterometallic systems.

Shustova's research group is also interested in tuning rigidity and linker installation in photochromic scaffolds, specifically in spiropyran-based MOF photoswitches, and the control of cycloelimination kinetics. To further explore photochromic behavior in solid-state materials as well as tunable electronic properties, Shustova and her team studied directional energy transfer in MOFs and COFs containing spiropyran and porphyrin derivatives. The team evaluated Förster resonance energy transfer (FRET) between the spiropyran and porphyrin moieties in both the forward and reverse directions as a function of excitation wavelength. Moreover, the prepared materials showed both optical and current cycling because of the installed photochromic units. These photo-responsive materials provide fundamental knowledge to monitor changes in material properties such as material aging and structural deterioration over time.

Shustova has also considered MOFs as candidates for nuclear waste administration. These frameworks have the potential to sequester radionuclide waste-form materials, and function as a versatile platform for selective actinide separation, and sensing. She has studied the thermodynamics and electronic structure in actinide containing MOFs, highlighting the solvent-assisted structural dynamism (crystalline-to-amorphous-to-crystalline transformations) unique to these materials. She has further reported the ability to control radionuclide leaching kinetics in MOFs as a function of post-synthetic capping linker installation. Furthermore, the group established a photophysics-electronics relationship for actinide-containing MOFs (An-MOFs) depending on excitiation wavelength and were able to tailor the optoelectronic properties of An-MOFs through integration of photochromic linkers. Additionally, they showed that the field-effect response of photochromic MOFs could be modulated by light exposure by constructing the first photochromic MOF-based field effect transistor (FET), and they were able to operate a two-LED fail safe indicator circuit utilizing the change in current caused by alternating light exposure.

Shustova has developed the first example of a unique one-step C=C bond cleavage in the traditionally very robust π-bowl occurring via an electron shuttle reaction. Such ring-opening has not been observed for π-bowls for instance, corannulene to date in the literature. Thus, the presented solid-state, solution, and theoretical methodology are the first steps toward understanding possible ways to synthesize accessible structures by opening the corannulene core and application of the latter for molecular electronic development. However, the "solution" approach has some advantages over the one-step solid-state synthesis as it doesn't depend on the electron shuttle system, and it provides a scalable route for this synthesis as well.

One of Shustova's most recent publications investigates the role of MOFs as both a reagent carrier and catalyst for synthetic routes important to the pharmaceutical industry. Taking advantage of the reversible gas adsorption of MOFs, cobalt and magnesium-based frameworks were used as solid-state carriers for toxic gas reagents (e.g., carbon monoxide and nitric oxide) for aminocarbonylation, carbonylative Suzuki-Miyaura coupling, and aromatization reactions with yields comparable to standard literature procedures.

== Awards and honors ==
During her independent career, she has received numerous awards including:

- Friedrich Wilhelm Bessel Research Award, The Alexander von Humboldt Foundation (2023)
- Hans Fischer Fellowship (2020)
- Camille Dreyfus Teacher-Scholar Award (2019)
- McCausland Fellowship (2019)
- Distinguished Undergraduate Research Mentor Award (2019)
- Alfred P. Sloan Fellowship (2017)
- Cottrell Scholar Award (2017)
- Breakthrough Research Award (2017)
- Scialog Fellow of the Research Corporation for Science Advancement (2017)
- NSF CAREER Award (2016)
- ACS PRF (2016)
- MIT Infinite Kilometer Postdoctoral Award (2013)
- MIT/Bruker Symposium Poster Award (2013)

== Selected publications ==
Her publications include:

- Thaggard, Grace G. C.; Park, K. C.; Jim, J; Maldeni Kankanamalage, B. K. P.; Haimerl, J.; Wilson, G. R.; McBride, M. K.; Forrester, K. L.; Adelson, E. R.; Arnold, V. S.; Wetthasinghe, S. T.; Rassolov, V. A.; Smith, M.D.; Sosnin, D.; Aprahamian, I.; Karmakar, M.; Bag, S.K.; Thakur, A.; Zhang, M.; Tang, B. Z.; Castaño, J. A.; Chaur, M. N.; Lerch, M. M.; Fischer, R. A.; Aizenberg, J.; Herges, R.; Lehn, J.-M.; Shustova, N. B. (2023). "Breaking the Photoswitch Speed Limit". Nat. Commun. 14 (1): 7556. Bibcode:2023NatCo..14.7556T. doi:10.1038/s41467-023-43405-w. PMC 10660956. PMID 37985777.
- Wilson, Gina R.; Park, Kyoung Chul; Thaggard, Grace C.; Martin, Corey R.; Hill, Austin R.; Haimerl, Johanna; Lim, Jaewoong; Maldeni Kankanamalage, Buddhima K. P.; Yarbrough, Brandon J.; Forrester, Kelly L.; Fischer, Roland A.; Pellechia, Perry J.; Smith, Mark D.; Garashchuk, Sophya; Shustova, Natalia B. (2023). "Cooperative and Orthogonal Switching in the Solid State Enabled by Metal-Organic Framework Confinement Leading to a Thermo-Photochromic Platform". Angew. Chem. Int. Ed. 62 (37) e202308715. Bibcode:2023ACIE...62E8715W. doi:10.1002/anie.202308715. PMID 37486788.
- Park, K. C.; Kittikhunnatham, P.; Lim, J.; Thaggard, G. C.; Liu, Y.; Martin, C. R.; Leith, G. A.; Toler, D. J.; Ta, A. T.; Birkner, N.; Lehman-Andino, I.; Hernandez-Jimenez, A.; Morrison, G.; Amoroso, J. W.; zur Loye, H.-C.; DiPrete, D. P.; Smith, M. D.; Brinkman, K. S.; Phillpot, S. R.; Shustova, N. B. (2023). "f-block MOFs: A Pathway to Heterometallic Transuranics". Angew. Chem. Int. Ed. 62 (5) e202216349. Bibcode:2023ACIE...62E6349P. doi:10.1002/anie.202216349. OSTI 1910285. PMID 36450099.
- Thaggard, G. C.; Haimerl, J.; Fischer, R. A.; Park, K. C.; Shustova, N. B. (2023). "Traffic Lights for Catalysis: Stimuli-Responsive Molecular and Extended Catalytic Systems". Angew. Chem. Int. Ed. 62 (29) e202302859. Bibcode:2023ACIE...62E2859T. doi:10.1002/anie.202302859. PMID 36995914.

== Book chapters ==
- Shustova, Natalia (2011). Perfluoroalkylation of Fullerenes. World Scientific. pp. 102–135. ISBN 978-981-4327-82-4.
- Shustova, Natalia (2013). High-Yield Synthesis of a Single Asymmetric Isomer of C70(CF3)10 by High Temperature Radical Trifluoromethylation. John Wiley and Sons. pp. 447–449. ISBN 978-1-118-40944-2.
