= Mikhail Romm (footballer) =

Russian association football player (1891–1967)

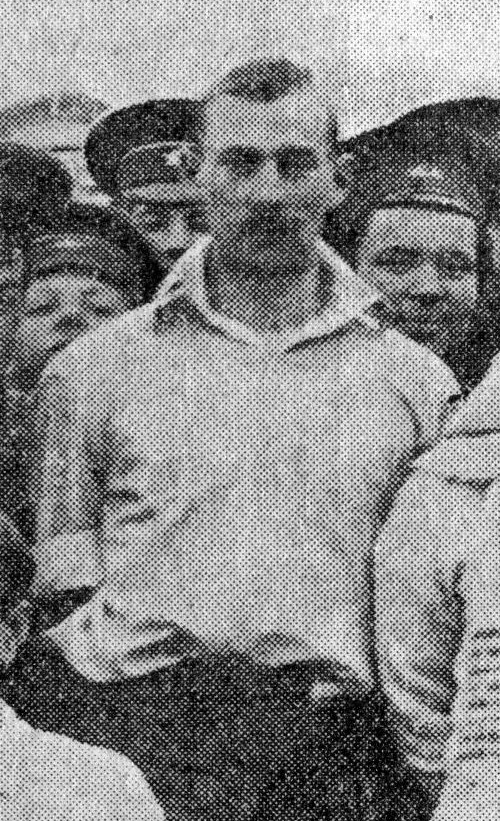
Mikhail Romm from photograph of the national team of the Moscow Football League in 1910

Mikhail Davidovich Romm (Russian: Михаи́л Дави́дович Ромм; born 1891, Vladimir, Imperial Russia – died October 22, 1967, Shymkent, Kazakhstan) was a football player in the Soviet Union. He wrote the book I Support Spartak (1965), which contained memoirs of his life as a footballer.
