= Anna Narinskaya =

Russian journalist and literary critic (born 1966)

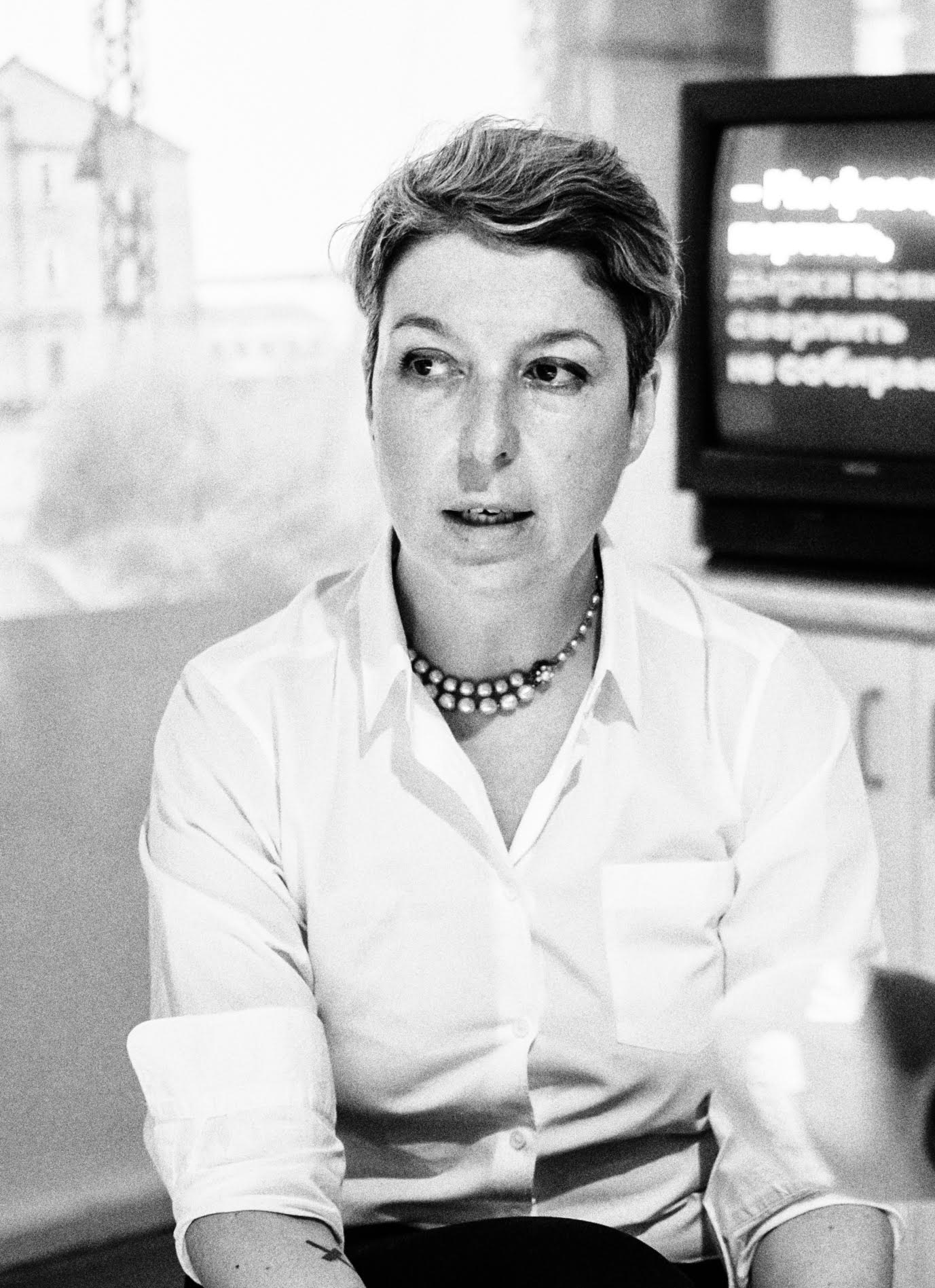
Narinskaya in 2018

Anna Anatolievna Narinskaya (Russian: А́нна Анато́льевна Нари́нская; born April 13, 1966, Leningrad, USSR) is a Russian journalist, literary critic, exhibition curator.

== Biography ==
Anna was born in 1966. Her mother was Galina Mikhailovna Narinskaya (1936-2023), her father was Yevgeny Rein, and her stepfather was Anatoly Naiman.

In 1990, she graduated from the philological faculty of Moscow State University. From 1993 to 1998, she worked at the Moscow office of the BBC television company as a producer of news and documentary films. Since 1997, she has been a writer and editor of culture articles for Expert Magazine. From 2003 to 2017, she was a writer, and later the special correspondent of the Kommersant Publishing House, covering the cultural policy and literary process. Since 2017, she has been a regular wrote for the newspaper, Novaya Gazeta.
