= Denis Morozov =

Russian businessman (b. 1973)

Denis Stanislavovich Morozov
- Born: March 30, 1973 (age 53); Vienna, Austria
- Citizenship: Russian
- Education: Moscow State University Harvard Business School School of International and Public Affairs, Columbia University
- Occupations: economist, lawyer, entrepreneur, manager

Denis Stanislavovich Morozov (Russian: Денис Станиславович Морозов: born March 30, 1973, Vienna) is a Russian entrepreneur, President of Russian branch of Merrill Lynch, the investment banking division of Bank of America. Previously, he was the president and CEO of Uralkali, president and CEO of Norilsk Nickel, and executive director of the European Bank for Reconstruction and Development.

== Biography ==
=== Early life ===
Denis Morozov was born on March 30, 1973, in Vienna, where his parents worked for the Soviet diplomatic mission and where he spent the first years of his life. He went to school in Moscow, but at the age of 9 he returned to Austria due to his father's foreign trip. From the age of 12 he lived in Moscow separately from his family, studying at a sports boarding school and then at a sports school.

=== Education ===
In 1989 he entered the Moscow State University, Faculty of Economics (Political Economy Department), graduating with an external degree in 1993. Later studied at the Faculty of Law of Moscow State University, specialising in jurisprudence, graduating with honours in 1996. In 1999, he graduated from the Swiss Banking School with a specialisation in commercial banking and defended his thesis on "Project Finance: Risk Management and Insurance" at MGIMO, receiving a PhD in economics.

After a successful career in senior positions in Russian industry, Morozov continued his studies in the United States, graduating first from Harvard Business School and then from Columbia University School of International Affairs and Public Administration.

=== Career ===
His career started in 1992 at Ingosstrakh. From 1994, he worked at Alfa Bank as Deputy Head, Head of the Credit and Project Finance Department, and Vice President. In 1998, he became Head of the Commercial Banking Department of the International Finance Company Bank.

In 1999, at the invitation of Lev Kuznetsov, with whom he had previously worked at Alfa Bank, and Alexander Khloponin, he joined Norilsk Nickel. Morozov held the positions of Head of the Corporate Structures Department, Head of the Corporate Capital, Shareholder and Investor Relations Department, Head of the Legal Department, and was a member of the board of directors. In 2000–2001, he was responsible for the preparation and implementation of the company's reorganisation project, which effectively transformed Norilsk Nickel into a new public company. Morozov implemented a number of other highly successful projects, including the spin-off of Norilsk Nickel's gold mining assets into a separate company, Polyus Gold.

In early 2007, Morozov took over as president and CEO of Norilsk Nickel. At that time, controversy between the company's major shareholders escalated, but Morozov took a neutral stance, running the company solely in the interests of all shareholders and unwilling to take sides in the conflict, which by that time, in addition to Vladimir Potanin and Mikhail Prokhorov, included Viktor Vekselberg, Oleg Deripaska and Alisher Usmanov. As a result, he was forced to leave Nornickel in mid-2008 before the expiry of his employment contract.

He negotiated a job at TNK-BP. However, in January 2009, Morozov turned down an offer to head the oil company, as the Russian shareholders, contrary to earlier agreements, refused to step back from operational management and also attempted to significantly change the terms of the contract previously agreed with Morozov. As a result, the company was taken over by its shareholder Mikhail Fridman.

In late 2009, Morozov was appointed president and then CEO of Uralkali, and began work in February 2010, interrupting his studies at Columbia University. However, by the autumn of the same year, following the sale of the company by Dmitry Rybolovlev to Suleiman Kerimov's structures, Morozov decided to exercise his option in connection with the change of control and returned to New York to complete his studies at Columbia University.

In March 2011, Denis Morozov took up the position of executive director of the European Bank for Reconstruction and Development.

In 2012, he was elected Global Leader of the World Economic Forum and was a member of the management reserve under the patronage of the President of the Russian Federation.

Denis Morozov also served on the boards of directors of the Export Insurance Agency of Russia, United Grain Company, Alrosa, Rosseti, Russian Agricultural Bank, RusHydro and a number of other major Russian companies.

In 2018, after the next presidential election and the change of the Government, he left his position as executive director of the European Bank for Reconstruction and Development, completed his work on the boards of directors of state-owned companies and left the management reserve of the president of the Russian Federation due to his transfer to a leading global financial institution Bank of America as managing director and President of Russian branch of Merrill Lynch.

== Personal life ==
Morozov has been a sports enthusiast since childhood, particularly fond of water, sailing and mountain sports. He is married with two adult children.

== Awards ==
- Order of Honour (26 March 2018) — for contribution to the development of international financial and economic cooperation
- Order of Friendship (2 May 2012) — for labour achievements, many years of conscientious work, active public activity
- Order of Honour (22 October 2015, Belarus) — for significant personal contribution to the development of cooperation between the Republic of Belarus and the European Bank for Reconstruction and Development
- Gratitude of the President of the Russian Federation (24 October 2013) — for labour achievements, many years of conscientious work and active public activity
- Certificate of Honour of the Ministry of Industry and Energy of the Russian Federation
- Certificate of Honour of the Ministry of Industry and Trade of the Russian Federation
- Certificate of Honour of the Ministry of Energy of the Russian Federation
- Gratitude of the Minister of Economic Development of the Russian Federation
- Certificate of Honour of the Ministry of Economic Development of the Russian Federation
- Gratitude of the Government of the Russian Federation
