= Elena Zoubareva =

Russian soprano

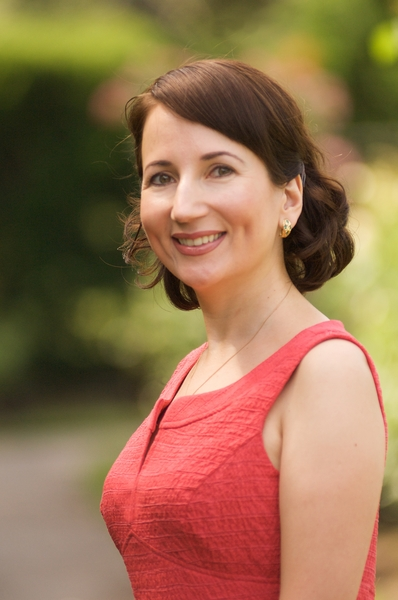
- Occupation: Opera Singer
- Website: https://www.elenazoubareva.com/

Elena Zoubareva is a Russian American soprano specializing in opera and classical crossover. Zoubareva is also a voice expert and a creator of the FitVoice program

Born in Soviet Union and educated at Moscow State University and Berklee College of Music, Elena has performed in concert halls in Europe and the United States, including Russian Academy of Theatre Arts, Moscow Army Theater, JFK Library, Berklee College of Music and the Boston Conservatory.

Her most recent CD, Allure, was produced by Jonathan Wyner. Elena’s recording of Ennio Morricone’s song C’era una volta il West (Once upon a Time in the West) from the Allure album reached the top song in Opera and Holiday Classical Categories on CDBaby.

== Early life and education ==
Elena Zoubareva was born in Alma-Ata, Kazakh SSR, the second child of Ivan Zoubarev, a Soviet military conductor, and Zarema Zoubareva, (née Plieva, of a prominent Ossetian family) a lawyer. Many of Zoubareva's relatives on her father's side are artists and musicians, including her aunts: the late Irina Kalik, a ballerina at the Stanislavski and Nemirovich-Danchenko Moscow Academic Music Theatre, Galina Soboleva, a music critic and a publishing author and Elena G. Zoubareva, a radio music editor. Zoubareva's father, Ivan Zoubarev, was awarded the title Distinguished or Meritorious Artist of Russia.

Zoubareva's early music education was overseen by her father. She learned to read music before learning to read words. At the age of 6 she entered a formal music school, studying classical singing, piano, ear training, harmony and history of music. Since the beginning of her formal music education, Zoubareva has specialised in audiation, which refers to the ability to mentally remember and hear music, without the actual physical presence of sound.

At the age of 8 she sang the title role in a children's opera Thumbelina. At the age of 15 she performed at the Moscow Army Theater. After graduating from Boris Tchaikovsky Moscow Music school, Zoubareva was accepted simultaneously at the Ippolitov-Ivanov Music College in Moscow to study classical singing and at Moscow State University to study journalism. After the untimely death of her father, as a result of a psychological trauma Elena developed functional dysphonia. The lack of a comprehensive treatment in Russia resulted in ultimate loss of her voice which forced Zoubareva to quit Music College and pause her singing career,

== Career ==
Zoubareva’s voice gradually returned several years later and she resumed private lessons with Lydia Kovaleva, a former star of the Bolshoi Opera Theater. Zoubareva credits Madame Kovaleva for fully restoring her voice. While visiting the US for the first time on a business trip under the invitation of the US Meat Export Federation, Zoubareva arranged a consultation with a renowned US voice instructor Dave Stroud. Impressed with Zoubareva's voice and interpretive abilities, Stroud encouraged her to restore her professional singing career.

Zoubareva went on to study at Berklee College of Music in Boston, MA on a full scholarship and in 2003 graduated cum laude. Elena's teachers at Berklee included, among others, her voice professor Kathryn Wright and her stage performance technique teacher, Livingston Taylor. Upon graduation, Zoubareva recorded and released her first full-length CD, La Tempesta Di Mare.

In New England, Elena’s career continued to grow, as she performs at such venues as the JFK Library, Berklee College of Music and the Boston Conservatory. In 2006 she sang at the Springtime Gala, the event raised over $2 million to benefit students and adults of Cardinal Cushing Centers, Inc.

In 2009 Zoubareva recorded her second CD, Allure, produced by Grammy-nominated producer Jonathan Wyner, of M-Works.

Elena recorded Ennio Morricone's song "C’era una volta il West" (Once upon a Time in the West) from the Allure album, which for two months in 2011 was the top song in Opera and Holiday Classical categories on CD Baby.

Zoubareva has been interested in vocal health for many years, participating actively and conducting her own professional research, resulting in developing the FitVoice program, designed to educate American people about vocal health and correct usage of their speaking voices, even teaching Red Sox fans how to cheer correctly and analyzing the speaking voices of TV personalities, politicians and celebrities.

She has collaborated with Harvard otolaryngologist "ENT" Dr. Phillip Song and speech language pathologist Keiko Ishikawa of Harvard/Massachusetts Eye and Ear Infirmary to learn about the medical implications of singing and speaking, vocal health, cutting edge vocal rehabilitation and the latest professional voice-related research studies. With the FitVoice Zoubareva appeared in the media, including Oprah Radio, ABC News, The Callie Crossley Show on WGBH (FM), All Things Considered on NPR/WBUR, The Boston Globe, 7 WHDH, The Boston Herald, and The Boston Phoenix. The Boston Herald called Zoubareva "Boston's own voice expert"

In September 2011, Elena was cast in the original ending of the Paramount Pictures blockbuster "World War Z", starring Brad Pitt and directed by Marc Forster (Finding Neverland, Quantum of Solace, Kite Runner, Monster's Ball). Elena was flown to Budapest, Hungary, where the original ending was filmed. She played a mysterious opera singer who sang an aria during a crucial final battle scene.

== Personal life ==
Zoubareva was married to Stanton Generalovich, a Serbian American and a fellow Eastern Orthodox. The couple divorced in 2009.

== Discography ==
- La Tempesta Di Mare (2005)
- Allure (2009)
