= Victor Lyatkher =

Victor Mikhailovitch Lyatkher (born 1933) is a professor, engineer, and inventor. Born in Kerch, Lyatkher holds a Ph.D. in Engineering Science from the University of Leningrad and a doctorate in science from Moscow State University. Lyatkher has developed and patented numerous processes and machines. These deal mainly with renewable energy sources such as tidal power, water turbines, and vertical axis wind turbines. He developed a new method to forecast long-term variations in the Caspian Sea level, and designed a new kind of low head turbine. Lyatkher has worked for over thirty years in the wind and hydro-power industry. He has received several prizes and awards for his accomplishments, including the Prize of the Council of Ministers of the USSR, the Award of the Indian Society of Earthquake Technology, and five medals of the All Union USSR Exhibition, gold, silver and bronze.

In February 2016 Lyatkher joined British American Turbines Ltd. as Chief Engineer. Prior to that he was the president of New Energetics, located in Cleveland, Ohio. He is a member of various societies, including the Academy of Water Research, Russia, and the International Association for Hydraulic Research, Netherlands. He has published numerous books (in English and in Russian) on the subject of renewable energy, and was the original inventor of helical turbine, patented in the USSR in 1983.

== Family ==
Lyatkher's family includes his grandson Andre Yazhbin.

== Patents ==
Lyatkher has more than 70 patents; 20 of these deal exclusively with renewable power sources. Listed below are some of his patents including some which were patented through the European Patent Office.

1. Non-vibrating units for conversion of fluid stream energy
2. Power installation for conversion of energy and water air streams.
3. Power unit.
4. Wave flow power installation.
5. Dam-free hydropower plant.
6. Wave-power installation.
7. Wind-driven power plant.
8. Direct-Drive Windmill with vertical axle of rotation.
9. Windmill.
10. Collector for selective water intake.
11. Wind drive motor.
12. Wind motor with vertical axis of rotation.
13. Wind power engine with vertical axis of rotation
14. Rotor of wind engine with vertical axis of rotation.
15. Wind Engine
16. Rotor of wind motor
17. Wind motor vertical axis of rotation
18. Rotor of wind motor with vertical rotation axle.
19. Vessel
20. Orthogonal vane propeller.
21. Method of erecting dam by explosion for caving.
22. Wind power plant
23. Hydraulic turbine unit.
24. Windmill with vertical axis of rotation.
25. Wind power plant
26. Wind Motor with vertical axis of rotation.
27. Original helical turbine.

== Works and publications ==
Lyatkher, V., "High Power Windmills on the Ground or Sea", General Report in International Congress of Energetic Province La Coruna, Spain, May 2007 3.

Lyatkher, V., "High Power Orthogonal Wind Power Units on the Surface of the Lake Erie", Solar 2007, Cleveland, July 8–10, 2007, Report 029A

Lyatkher, V., "Tidal Power as Basis for Hydrogen Energetic", 16 World Hydrogen Energy Conference, 13–16 June, Lyon, France, Report 704 4.

Lyatkher, V., "Solar Cycle Length Stochastic Association with Caspian Sea Level", Geophysical Res. Letters, vol.27, NO. 22, pg. 3727-3730, Nov.15, 2000

Lyatkher, V.M, "Variation of Seismic Regime of Earth under the influence of solar cycle length changes", Earth Physics, 2000, No 10, p. 93-96

== See also ==
=== Related subjects ===
- Wind power in the United States
- Sustainable engineering
- Sustainable energy
- Tidal power
- Marine energy
