= Alexander Salomonovich =

Russian astronomer

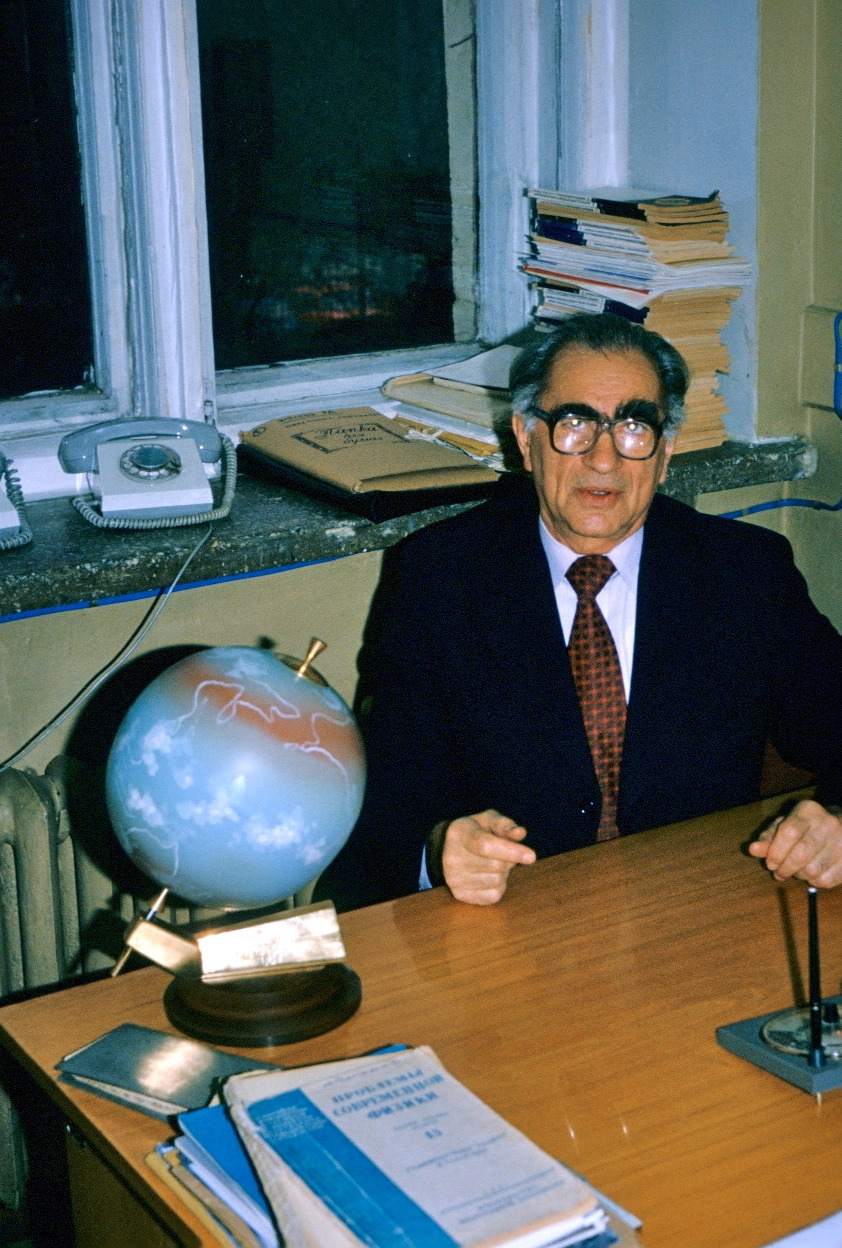
Alexander Salomonovich, December 1980

Alexander Yefimovich Salomonovich (Russian: Александр Ефимович Саломонович; 1916–1989) was a Soviet radio astronomer. He graduated from the Physical Faculty of Moscow State University in 1939.

During 1953–1959, he was chief scientist responsible for creation of the Lebedev RT-22 22 meter precision radio telescope and until 1964 he was the chief scientist for operations with this instrument.
