= Alec Rasizade =

Azerbaijani-American history professor (born 1947)

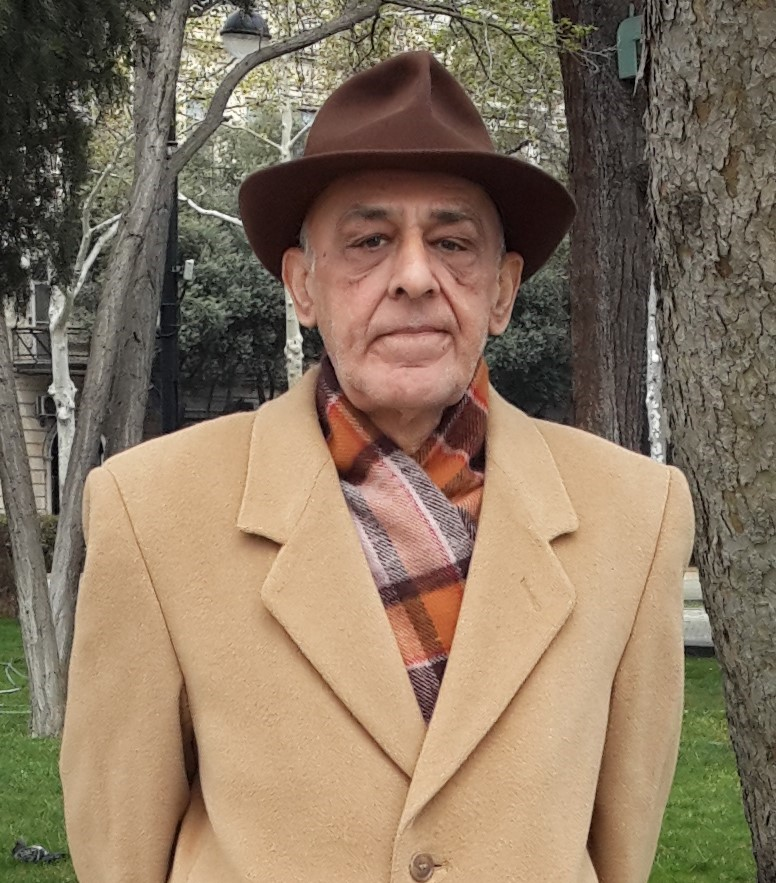
- Professor Rasizade visiting Baku in 2022
- Born: 21 May 1947 (age 79); Nakhchivan, Azerbaijan, USSR
- Citizenship: United States
- Education: Azerbaijan State University, Moscow State University, Columbia University (New York)
- Known for: Algorithm of Rasizade
- Scientific career
- Fields: Contemporary history
- Workplaces: Academy of Sciences of the USSR, Columbia University
- Thesis: Truman Doctrine (1974)
- Doctoral advisors: Н.В.Сивачёв (USSR), T.Swietochowski (USA)

Alec Rasizade (Azerbaijani: Əli Rasizadə) is a prominent Soviet and American professor of history and political science, who specialized in Sovietology, primarily known for the typological model (or "algorithm" in his own words), which describes the impact of a decline in oil revenues on the process of decline in rentier states by stages and cycles of their general socio-economic degradation upon the end of an oil boom. He has also authored more than 200 studies on the history of the 20th century, Perestroika reforms and breakup of the USSR, oil diplomacy and contemporary politics in the post-Soviet states and autonomies of Russia, Central Asia and the Caucasus.

== Education and scholarship ==
Alec Rasizade was born in the city of Nakhchivan, Azerbaijan SSR, Soviet Union, in 1947 and graduated from the history department of Azerbaijan State University in 1969, then graduated and received a PhD degree in history from Moscow State University in 1974 (with a thesis on the Truman Doctrine), and the Doctor of History degree from the USSR Academy of Sciences in 1990 (for dissertation on Turkey in the system of NATO). He subsequently worked as a professor of modern history at Azerbaijan State University from 1974 to 1980, and a senior research fellow at Azerbaijan National Academy of Sciences from 1981 to 1990.

Upon the demise of the USSR in 1991, Rasizade moved to the United States as a visiting professor of history at the University of South Florida in Tampa. Furthermore, as a Fulbright professor, he taught Soviet history in the 1990s at Stanford, Berkeley, UCLA, Harvard, SAIS, Monmouth and other universities. After obtaining in 1995 a doctorate in history from Columbia University in New York (based on the scope of his lectures and publications), he worked at its Harriman Institute. In 2000, Rasizade was invited to Washington to work at the Center for Strategic and International Studies, whereupon in 2004 he moved to the newly established Historical Research Center of the National Academy of Sciences, where wrote his most significant works until retiring upon its closure in 2013.

Professor Rasizade occasionally participates in academic, educational, social, analytical and legislative events, discussions, panels, peer reviews, interviews, broadcasts and hearings as an expert in post-Soviet states. He is also an advisory or editorial board member in a number of the world's leading academic journals in his field of Soviet studies, and professor emeritus of Baku State University.

== Significant studies ==
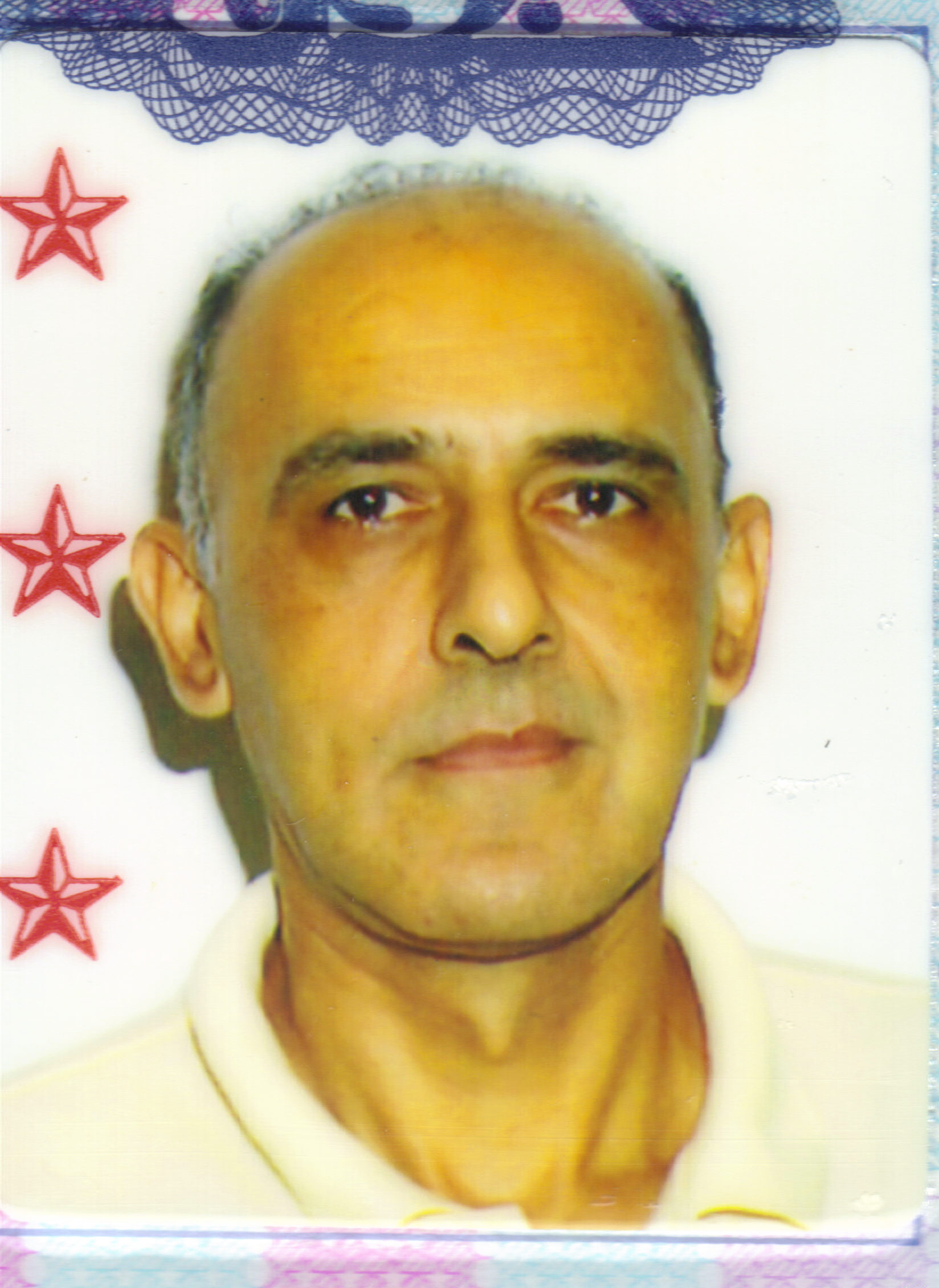
Alec Rasizade in 2000 on a US passport photograph

Rasizade's academic contribution to Sovietology may be divided into four general categories: the Caspian oil boom, Perestroika in Russia, Azerbaijan and Central Asia. His ideas and conclusions for each of these major studies are summarized in the following theses:

1) Having an insider knowledge of Caspian oil reserves, he precisely calculated and predicted in his writings the exact end of the Caspian oil boom of 2000–2020, notwithstanding the geopolitical euphoria of the 1990s in Western capitals based on the grossly exaggerated estimates by international academia and news media, Azerbaijan's government and the Caspian oil consortium.

2) On Russia, he wrote that Putin's Bonapartism was a natural result of the 1990s turmoil, when the society as a whole and the nouveau riches in particular, longed for a strongman who could establish order, stability and legitimacy for the illegally acquired wealth even at the expense of civil rights restriction. Furthermore, Rasizade argues that the demise of the USSR was only the first stage in the process of the Russian Federation's own breakup or, as he put it bluntly, Russia is doomed to disintegrate as did before all multinational empires in history.

3) Azerbaijan, in his view, is a classic Middle Eastern petrostate, which will eventually sink into its legitimate place among the impoverished Muslim nations with the end of the current oil boom, as is predetermined by its social system, form of government, national ideology and culture, endemic corruption and lack of industrial endowment. He insists that the first (1900–1920) and the second (2000–2020) Baku oil booms were just a deviation in Azerbaijan's natural, logical and historic path from a Soviet socialist republic to a Third world country.

4) As for Central Asia, the main argument in his publications is the futility of Western efforts to impose there the democratic values of European civilization, since a democracy in Muslim nations inevitably leads to election and entrenchment of Islamism, as has been proven by American interventions in other Islamic countries. Instead of direct involvement, he recommended to US government a support for local tyrants who were able to maintain peace in the region and order in their countries by the brutally effective methods of the same Islamofascism.

== Rasizade's algorithm ==
The most outstanding work of Alec Rasizade, which gained an international acclaim, was the eponymous algorithm of decline theory, described in his 2008 article at the peak of oil prices, when nothing foreshadowed their steep fall and the subsequent onset of global economic recession with irreversible consequences for oil-exporting nations. Algorithm of Rasizade (or Paradox of Rasizade) is studied at top universities to assess the development (or degradation) prospects of such countries. Before that, the effect of rising oil prices, rendered to strengthen the national currencies and affect the economies of rentier states as a result of oil boom, was described only by the "Dutch disease" theory, first introduced in 1977.

However, that theory could not foretell the further course of developments after a drop in oil prices on the world market: what would have turned out for oil-dependent countries upon the end of their oil booms? And precisely that happened in 2008, when the price of oil collapsed from $147 per barrel in the middle of the year to $32 by its end, i.e. by 75 percent. Exactly at that moment came out of press the aforementioned article, in which Rasizade explained the chain reaction of an inescapable sequence of events in the process of impoverishment, degradation and decline in living standards of nations whose welfare depends on the export of natural resources, when one change inevitably entails another. The appearance of the article was so timely that the described algorithm, which was unfolding in real time, had been picked up in scholarly literature as a typological model by the name of its author.

Rasizade's algorithm may be described succinctly as the following chain reaction (domino effect): a decline in oil production or a drop in the price of oil translates into a synchronous fall in the inflow of petrodollars, which results in the collapse of treasury's revenues and expenditures, which leads to devaluation of the local currency, which ensues (in a free market) a tumble in prices of goods, services and real estate in dollar terms, which squeezes the tax base, which entails the redundancy of government bureaucracy, nationwide layoffs and bankruptcies in the private sector, which further squeezes the tax base, which results in cutting wages and social benefits, which causes mass unemployment and impoverishment of the populace, which triggers a growing dissatisfaction of power elite, which brings about a regime change with redistribution of wealth and property.

After this, the whole cycle repeats itself on a lower level of revenues and living standards until the final slump of such country into its historically legitimate and economically stable place among the Third World nations. This is the final stage of algorithm, after which an industrial development may (or may not, as the experience of backward countries shows) begin in a given state — such a prediction does not lend itself to political or economic calculations and depends on the mentality and traditions of each particular nation. Therefore, after adjusting to the new standards of living, these nations can exist in the condition of entropy indefinitely.

== Notable publications ==
(The full list of published academic works, studies, lectures, articles and essays of A.Rasizade is presented in the Azerbaijani Wikipedia).

- 15 political essays published by the Contemporary Review (Oxford) quarterly in 2001-2011.
- Putin’s place in Russian history. = International Politics (London: Palgrave-Macmillan), September 2008, volume 45, number 5, pages 531-553.
- Putin’s mission in the Russian Thermidor. = Welt Trends: Zeitschrift für internationale Politik (Potsdam), May-June 2008, number 60, pages 53–60.
- Putin’s mission in the Russian Thermidor. = Communist and Post-Communist Studies (Amsterdam: Elsevier publishers for the University of California), March 2008, volume 41, number 1, pages 1-25.
- Putin's mission in the Russian Thermidor. = World Affairs (Delhi), Winter 2007, volume 11, number 4, pages 142-176.
- Türkiye açısından Truman Doktrini ve Stalin diplomasisinin hataları (translated into Turkish by M.Ahmedov). = Belleten (Ankara: Türk Tarih Kurumu), April 1991, volume 55, number 212, pages 239-255.
- The new ‘great game’ in Central Asia after Afghanistan. = Alternatives: Turkish Journal of International Relations (Istanbul), Summer 2002, volume 1, number 2, pages 125–134.
- Dictators, Islamists, big powers and ordinary people: the new ‘great game’ in Central Asia. = Internationale Politik und Gesellschaft (Bonn: F.Ebert Stiftung), July 2002, number 3, pages 90-106.
- Entering the old ‘great game’ in Central Asia. = Orbis (Philadelphia: Pergamon Press for Foreign Policy Research Institute), Winter 2003, volume 47, number 1, pages 41-58.
- Na Afghanistan het nieuwe Grote Spel in Centraal-Azië (translated into Dutch by G.J.Telkamp). = Internationale Spectator (The Hague: Netherlands Institute of International Relations), October 2002, volume 56, number 10, pages 494-500.
- A propos of the Georgian war: reflections on Russia's revanchism in its near abroad. = Journal of Balkan and Near Eastern Studies (London: Taylor & Francis), March 2009, volume 11, number 1, pages 9-27.
- L'imbroglio du Karabakh: une perspective azérie (translated into French by B.Eisenbaum). = Les Cahiers de l'Orient (Paris), Hiver 2011, numéro 101, pages 83–95.
- Azerbaijan descending into the Third World after a decade of independence. = Comparative Studies of South Asia, Africa and the Middle East (Duke University Press), 2002 double issue, volume 22, numbers 1-2, pages 127—139.
- Azerbaijan after a decade of independence: less oil, more graft and poverty. = Central Asian Survey (London: Taylor & Francis), December 2002, volume 21, number 4, pages 349-370.
- Azerbaijan after Heydar Aliev. = Nationalities Papers (London: Taylor & Francis), March 2004, volume 32, number 1, pages 137-164.
- The mythology of munificent Caspian bonanza and its concomitant pipeline geopolitics. = Central Asian Survey (London: Taylor & Francis), March 2002, volume 21, number 1, pages 37-54.
- Mythology of the munificent Caspian bonanza and its concomitant pipeline geopolitics. = Comparative Studies of South Asia, Africa and the Middle East (Duke University Press), 2000 double issue, volume 20, numbers 1-2, pages 138–152.
- The great game of Caspian energy: ambitions and the reality. = Journal of Southern Europe and the Balkans (London: Taylor & Francis), April 2005, volume 7, number 1, pages 1-17.
- Azerbaijan in transition to the "new age of democracy". = Communist and Post-Communist Studies (Los Angeles: University of California), September 2003, volume 36, number 3, pages 345—372.
- Azerbaijan's prospects in Nagorno-Karabakh. = Journal of Balkan and Near Eastern Studies (London: Taylor & Francis), June 2011, volume 13, number 2, pages 215-231.
- Azerbaijan's prospects in Nagorno-Karabakh with the end of oil boom. = Iran and the Caucasus (Leiden: Brill), 2011 double issue, volume 15, numbers 1-2, pages 299-317.
- Azerbaijan's prospects in Nagorno-Karabakh. = World Affairs (Delhi), Summer 2011, volume 15, issue 2, pages 139–164.
- Azerbaijan's prospects in Nagorno-Karabakh. = Mediterranean Quarterly (Duke University Press), Summer 2011, volume 22, number 3, pages 72-94.
- Azerbaijan and the oil trade: prospects and pitfalls. = The Brown Journal of World Affairs (Brown University Press), Summer-Fall 1997, volume 4, number 2, pages 277—294.
- Azerbaijan, the US and oil prospects on the Caspian Sea. = Journal of Third World Studies (Association of Third World Studies), Spring 1999, volume 16, number 1, pages 29-48.
- US gaze on oil bonanza: perception and reality in Azerbaijan. = Indian Journal of Asian Affairs (Jaipur), December 2002, volume 15, number 2, pages 17–32.
- Book review: Let Our Fame be Great, by Oliver Bullough (London: Penguin Books, 2011, 512 pages). = Debatte: Journal of Contemporary Central and Eastern Europe (London: Taylor & Francis), December 2011, volume 19, issue 3, pages 689-692.
