= Alexander Dolin =

Russian Japanologist

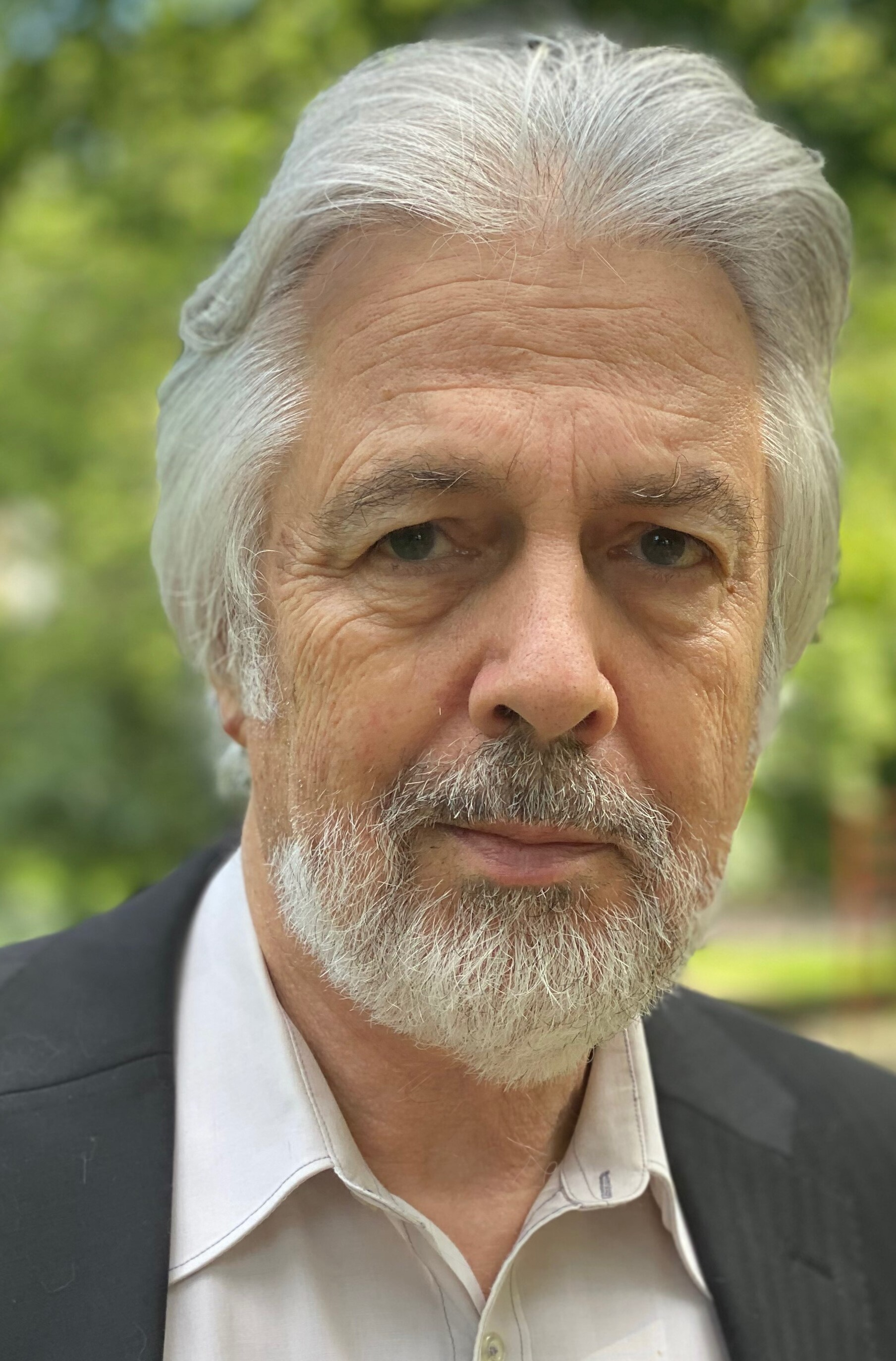
- Alexander Dolin
- Born: 1949 (age 76–77); Soviet Union
- Occupations: Japanologist; researcher; poet; translator
- Known for: Japanese poetry translations into Russian, German, and English

Academic background
- Education: Moscow State University; Russian Academy of Sciences

Academic work
- Institutions: Tokyo University of Foreign Studies; Akita International University; National Research University Higher School of Economics

Alexander Dolin (born 1949) is a prominent Russian Japanologist, researcher and translator of classic and modern Japanese poetry.

== Studies ==
Alexander Dolin graduated from the Oriental Languages College of Moscow State University in 1971 and started his academic career at the Russian Academy of Sciences (Institute of Oriental Studies). There he received a PhD degree in Japanese Literature.

== Academic career ==
In 1992 Dolin moved to Japan where he worked as a Professor of Comparative Literature at Tokyo University of Foreign Studies for twelve years. In 2004-2017, he worked in Akita International University as a Professor of Japanese Literature and Comparative Culture. In 2017, having completed his career in Japan as Professor Emeritus at AIU, moved back to Russia and was welcomed there as a Professor of Japanese Literature and Culture at the School of Asian Studies, National Research University Higher School of Economics (Moscow).

Dolin is the author and translator of more than 70 monographs on Japanese and Russian literature, culture and religion. He has published a great variety of anthologies and individual collections, introducing Japanese poetry and linking it to the development of society.

Dolin also published the first and only collection of Edo period tanka poetry in Russian, The Autumn Cicadas. In 2022, he published the "Great Library of Japanese Poetry in 8 volumes" (in Russian) — the result of his studies through the years which contains explanations and translations of Japanese poetry from the ancient times to the present day. His works on Japanese and Russian literature, culture, religion and society, as well as on world civilizations, were issued in Russian, German, English and Japanese.

== Selected works ==
Alexander Dolin is acknowledged as the author of several comprehensive books on Oriental Martial Arts. His works laid the foundation for the modern rise of interest in kenpo. He is also recognized as a philosophical poet and a writer.

=== Original works ===
1. Kempo – Die Kunst des Kampfes (Ostasiatische Kampfsportarten: Geschichte und Philosophie). Berlin, Sport Verlag, 1989. [in German]
2. Slaves of the Promised Land [約束の地の奴隷]. Tokyo, Chuokoron publishers, 1991. [in Japanese]
3. Moscow – The Doomed City [生贄の都モスクワ]. Tokyo, Yamate shobo shinsha, 1992. [in Japanese]
4. History of New Japanese Poetry. Tanka, Haiku, Kindaishi. In 4 Vol. St. Petersburg, Hyperion, 2007. [in Russian with English and Japanese summaries]
5. The Silver Age of Japanese Poetry – Romanticism and Symbolism. Akita International University Press, 2010. [in English]
6. The Fading Golden Age of Japanese Poetry – Tanka and Haiku in the New Times. Akita International University Press, 2014. [in English]
7. Russian Messiahnism (research monograph). St. Petrsburg, Aleteya, 2022. [in Russian with English summary]
8. Japanese Culture in the West / edited by A. Dolin. Moscow, Russian Academy of Sciences, Institute of Oriental Studies, 2025. [in Russian]

=== Major translations ===
1. The Tale of the Heike (tanka and verse; prose translated by I. Lvova). Moscow, Khudojestvennaya Literatura, 1982.
2. Kokinwakashu (complete poetic translation with parallel texts, verbal translation, academic commentary and introduction). In 3 Vol. Moscow, Raduga Publishers, 1995.
3. Masaoka Shiki. Selected Poetry and Literary Criticism (with academic commentary). St. Petersburg, Hyperion Publishers, 2000.
4. Suzuki Daisetsu. Zen Buddhism and its Influence on Japanese Culture (with introduction, commentary and selection of classic Japanese Zen poetry). St. Petersburg, Triada, 2004.
5. Osaragi Jiro. The Ronins from Ako (in 2 Vol.). St. Petersburg, Hyperion, 2006.
6. Masterpieces of Classic Japanese Poetry (8-19 cc.). Moscow, Exmo Publishers, 2010.
7. Basho and the Golden Age of Haiku. Moscow, Exmo Publishers, 2010.
8. Ishii Rogetsu. A Moon in a Dewdrop: Selected Haiku. Akita International University Press, 2013.
9. Great Library of Japanese Poetry. In 8 Vol. (classic and modern Japanese poetry V-XX cc.). Moscow, Nauka, 2022.
10. Japanese Seasons (haiku anthology). Vol. 1-4. Moscow, ACT Publishers, 2025.

== Awards ==
In 1995 Dolin was awarded the Special Contribution to Culture Prize by the All-Japan Translators' Association for his academic and poetic translation into Russian of the Kokin Wakashū immortal anthology (X c.).

The Union of Russian Writers awarded Alexander Dolin with a Medal of Honor for the Development of International Cultural Collaboration.
