= Victor Bayda =

Russian linguist

- Born: Виктор Викторович Байда; 1980 or 1981 (age 44–45); Moscow, Soviet Union
- Occupation: Oifigeach Pleanála Teanga (lit. 'language-planning officer')

Academic background
- Education: Moscow State University
- Thesis: The Evolution of Perfect Constructions in Icelandic and Goidelic (2009)

Academic work
- Discipline: Linguist
- Institutions: Moscow State University
- Main interests: Celtic and Germanic languages

Victor Victorovich Bayda (Russian: Виктор Викторович Байда; born 1980/1981) is a Russian linguist who specializes in Celtic and Germanic languages. He is currently a language-planning officer in the Iveragh Gaeltacht of County Kerry.

== Biography ==
A native of Moscow, Bayda first became interested in languages at the age of thirteen. He was particularly interested in Celtic languages, and by the time he went to university he had learnt some Welsh and Scottish Gaelic.

At Moscow State University, he studied Dutch and Irish. To order to improve his Irish, he spent one term at Trinity College Dublin. He later spent time in the Irish-speaking communities of An Spidéal and An Cheathrú Rua, and attended Acadamh na hOllscolaíochta Gaeilge.

He was a lecturer in Irish at Moscow State University for more than fifteen years, and received his doctorate from there in 2009, with a thesis entitled Эволюция перфектных конструкций в исландском и гойдельских языках (lit. 'The Evolution of Perfect Constructions in Icelandic and Goidelic').

In 2019, he was appointed as a language-planning officer (or Oifigeach Pleanála Teanga) for the Iveragh Gaeltacht (or Gaeltacht Uíbh Ráthaigh) of County Kerry, with the responsibility to devise and implement a plan to revive the Irish language there. In this role, he has advocated that the Gaeltacht regions be given their own senior ministry within the Irish government.

Bayda speaks ten languages: Russian, Irish, Scottish Gaelic, Welsh, Icelandic, Swedish, English, Dutch, German, and French.
