= Tatiana Vladislavovna Petrova =

Russian judicial scientist

Tatiana Vladislavovna Petrova (Russian: Татьяна Владиславовна Петрова; 14 March 1957) is a doctor of Judicial Science, Professor in the Department of Environmental and Land Law of Lomonosov Moscow State University Faculty of Law. She was born on March 14, 1957, in Pavlovsky Posad near Moscow.

== Education ==
She entered Lomonosov Moscow State University Faculty of Law in 1974 and graduated with honors in 1979.

She studied full-time at the graduate school of the Institute of State and Law of the Academy of Sciences of the USSR from 1980 to 1983.

She defended the candidate's dissertation on the "Organizational Legal Forms of Activities of the United Nations Food and Agricultural Organization (FAO) in Agricultural Development" (thesis supervisor – Professor M.I. Kozyr) on April 19, 1983. The defense took place at the Institute of State and Law of the Academy of Sciences of the USSR.

== Career ==
After graduate school, she worked as junior research assistant in the agricultural law sector at the Institute of State and Law, followed by the position of research officer at the All-Union Research Institute of Standardization, USSR Committee for Standardization and Methodology, where she studied the legal issues of standardization in the field of environmental protection.

She worked as senior lecturer and then as associate professor of the Department of Civil Law Disciplines, Law Institute of the USSR Ministry of Internal Affairs, where she has taught lecture courses and led workshops on environmental law and financial law since 1988. She has been working at the Department of Environmental and Land Law of Lomonosov MSU Faculty of Law since September 1, 1995, and she became a professor in 2001.

She defended her doctoral thesis on "Legal Issues of the Economic Framework for Environmental Protection" on October 13, 2000. The defense took place at the Faculty of Law, Lomonosov Moscow State University.

=== Teaching activities ===
Petrova teaches a general course of lectures on "Environmental Law," including within a framework of the Faculty of Law International Legal Programme at the International Center of Lomonosov Moscow State University (Geneva, Switzerland), as well as a special course of lectures on the "Legal Issues of the Economic Framework for Environmental Protection and Use of Natural Resources."

=== Legislative activities ===
She was involved in the working groups developing concepts and drafts of several federal laws and Moscow laws, in particular the federal bills "On Drinking Water," "On Water Supply," and "On Water Discharge" (2002–2003), as well as the Forest Code of the Russian Federation (2004), general and special parts of the Russian Federation Environmental Code (2009–2010), the federal bill # 584587-5 "On Amendments to Certain Legislative Acts of the Russian Federation in Terms of Improving Standardization in the Field of Environmental Protection and Introducing Measures of Economic Incentives for Businesses to Adopt the Best Technologies" (2011–2012), etc.

She participated many times in examining federal bills and laws of the Russian Federation constituents, as well as carrying out the state environmental review of project documentation as a visiting member of the expert committee.

She also participated in developing the basic draft of the General Part of the Russian Federation Environmental Code in 2006 and 2007, as well as developing the basic draft of the Special Part of the Russian Federation Environmental Code in 2007 and 2008.

She has been working in the position of Academic Secretary of the Faculty of Law Academic Council since 2004.

Tatiana Petrova is a member of Lomonosov Moscow State University Dissertation Council D 501.001.99 (Faculty of Law), academic secretary of the environmental law section of the Academic Association of Legal Education and a member of the Faculty of Law Methodological Commission.

She has been organizing and conducting meetings of the environmental law section within the annual December International Academic Conferences of the Faculty of Law since 2003.

She has been a member of the legal expert council of the Higher Attestation Commission of the Russian Federation Ministry of Education and Science since 2010.

Professor Tatiana Petrova, Doctor of Juridical Science served as the thesis supervisor of three candidates of juridical sciences: A.S. Krotik, A.S. Shirobokov, and D.F. Fatkullina.

== Publication ==
She has authored over 70 publications, including two monographs, eight study guides (seven of them co-authored), three dictionaries (co-authored), two commentaries to federal legislative acts (co-authored) and two textbooks (co-authored)"

- "Environmental Law of Russia. Practicum: Study Guide for Higher Education Institutions" / Edited by Prof. A.K. Golichenkov; compilers: A.K. Golichenkov and A.A. Vorontsova. 4th edition, revised and enlarged – M.: "Gorodets" Publishing House, 2011. – 352 p. (co-authorship);
- "Funding in the Field of Environmental Protection, Novel and Traditional Approaches" // Environmental Law. 2011. Special Issue. P. 40–46;
- "Rights to Natural Resources in the Concept of Proprietary Right Legislation Development." // Environmental Law. 2009. # 5–6. P. 27–30;
- "Ideas of V.V. Petrov on Codification of the Environmental Protection Legislation in Modern Age // Environmental Law. 2009. Special Issue. # 2–3. P. 68–75;
- "Legal Issues of Environmental Audit" // Agrarian and land law. 2007. # 1. P. 122–125;
- "Legal Issues of Improving Environmental Audit" // Topical Issues of the Environmental Law Development in the XXI Century. M. Writings of the Institute of State and Law, Russian Academy of Sciences. Publishing House of the Institute of State and Law, Russian Academy of Sciences. 2007;
- "Environmental Law and Land Law." Methodological materials / edited by A.K. Golichenkov. M. Gorodets. 2006. 358 p. (co-authored);
- "Academic and Practical Commentary to the Russian Federation Land Legislation" / Edited by O.L. Dubovik. EKSMO Publishing House. 2006. 11 Institute of State and Law, Russian Academy of Sciences. 10 p. – (co-authored);
- "Dictionary of Civil Law." Part 1. M. Gorodets. 2006. – 493 p.;
- "Payment for Use of Water Objects in the New Water Code of the Russian Federation" // Environmental Law. 2006. # 6. P. 27–29;
- "Technical Regulation as Part of the System of Legal Relations Regulation in the Field of Environmental Protection" // Environmental Law 2005. # 1, p. 78–80;
- "Sources of Russian law. Study guide" / Edited by Prof. M.N. Marchenko. M.: Norma. 2005. (co-authored);
- "Land Law in Russia. Practicum: Study Guide for Higher Education Institutions" / Edited by Prof. A.K. Golichenkov. Second edition, revised and enlarged. M.: JSC "Gorodets" Publishing House, 2005. 288 p. (co-authored);
- "Dictionary of Land Law." St. Petersburg. Law Center Press Publishing House. 2004. (co-authored);
- "Dictionary of Urban Planning Legislation." St. Petersburg. Law Center Press Publishing House. 2004. (co-authored);
- "Practicum on Environmental Law of Russia: Study Guide for Higher Education Institutions." / Edited by Prof. A.K. Golichenkov. Third edition, revised and enlarged. M.: BEK Publishing House. 2004. 258 p. (co-authored);
- "The 'Polluter Pays' principle" // Global Studies: Encyclopedia. Editor in chief I.I. Mazur, A.N. Chumakov. M.: JSC Raduga Publishing House. 2003. – 1328 p.;
- "Changes in Licensing Legislation in the Field of Environmental Management, Environmental Protection, and Safety." // Environmental Law. 2003. # 3;
- "Changes in Licensing Legislation in the Field of Environmental Management, Protection, and Safety" // Environmental Law. 2003. # 3, p. 13–19 (co-authored);
- "Economic Regulation in the System of Methods of Regulating Environmental Protection Relations." Russian State and Law at the Turn of the Century Digest. M. 2000;
- "Greening the Tax System." // Politics and Law. 2000. # 9;
- "The Issues of Charging for Environmental Pollution in the Context of the New Tax Legislation." Topical Issues of the Theory of State and Environmental Law Digest. M. MGUPS Law Institute Publishing House. 2000;
- "The Legal Aspect of Environmental Investments." Topical Issues of the Theory of State and Environmental Law Digest. M. MGUPS Law Institute Publishing House. 2000;
- "Tax Control of Environmental Pollution." // Legislation. 2000. # 8;
- "Tax and Budget Legislation Reform Impact on Regulation of Environmental Protection Relations." Environmental Law of Russia. Digest of Research and Practice Conferences 1995–2000. Second edition. M. Zertsalo. 2000;
- "Legal Issues of the System of Environmental Funds." // Legislation and Economics. 2000. # 10;
- "Economic Framework for Implementing Environmental Law Rules." M. MGUGiK. 2000;
- "Legal Issues of the Economic Framework for Environmental Protection." M. Zertsalo. 2000;
- "Legal Issues of Economic Regulation of Environmental Protection." Environmental Law of Russia. Digest of Research and Practice Conferences 1995–1998. M. Zertsalo. 1999;
- "Some Issues of Improving the Economic and Legal Framework for Environmental Protection." Environmental Law of Russia. Digest of Research and Practice Conferences 1995–1998. M. Zertsalo. 1999;
- "Governmental Record Keeping in the Field of Environmental Management and Protection" // Issues of Geodesy and Cartography. 1999. # 7;
- "Charging for Environmental Pollution: Fees or Taxes?" // The Moscow University Herald. Series 11 "Law". 1999. # 7.

Petrova's research interests include studying environmental legislation codification issues, development of the legal framework for environmental quality regulation, economic mechanism of environmental protection, and natural resources utilization. Professor Tatiana Petrova, Doctor of Juridical Science, is mentioned in 41 sources in the ConsultantPlus reference system databases. She is a member of the First International Interactive Juridical Portal «URISTI.TV».
