= Elena Fedorova =

Russian scientist (1927–2015)

Elena Fedorova (August 24, 1927, Moscow - May 18, 2015, Moscow) was a Soviet and Russian scholar of antiquity. She was a doctor of philology, specialising in classical philology and cultural history.

== Biography ==
Elena Fedorova was the daughter of the Soviet theater and film director Vasily Fedorov. She graduated from the Department of Classical Philology of the Faculty of Philology of Moscow State University. From 1958 she worked at the Department of Ancient Languages of the Faculty of History of Moscow State University; Professor.

== Bibliography ==
- Fedorova E. V. Latin epigraphy. - M.: Publishing house of Moscow State University, 1969.
- Fedorova E. V. Latin inscriptions. - M.: Publishing house of Moscow State University, 1976.
- Fedorova E.V. Imperial Rome in the faces. - M.: Publishing house of Moscow State University, 1979.
- Fedorova E. V. Introduction to Latin epigraphy. - M.: Publishing house of Moscow State University, 1982.
- Fedorova E.V. Famous cities of Italy. Rome. Florence. Venice. - M.: Publishing house of Moscow State University, 1985.
- Fedorova E.V. People of Imperial Rome. - M.: Publishing house of Moscow State University, 1990.
- Fedorova E.V. Early Latin writing of the 17th-2nd centuries. BC e. - M.: Publishing house of Moscow State University, 1991.
- Fedorova E.V. Imperial Rome in the faces. — M.: Inga, 1995.
- Fedorova E. V. The Tale of a Happy Man: [About the director V. F. Fedorov]. — M.: Klyuch, 1997.
- Fedorova E.V. Imperial Rome in the faces. - Rostov-on-Don: Phoenix; Smolensk: Inga, 1998.
- Fedorova E. V. Paris. Ages and people from the founding of the city to the Eiffel Tower. - M.: Publishing house of Moscow State University, 2000.
- Fedorova E.V. Imperial Rome in the faces. — M.: SLOVO/SLOVO, 2002.
- Fedorova E. V. England. Millennia and people from the Stone Age to the Queen Victoria Tower. - M.: New key, 2002.
- Fedorova E. V. Spain. Century. People. Art. - M.: New key, 2002.
- Fedorova E. V. Malta. Millennium. People. Secrets. - M.: New key, 2003.
- Fedorova E. V. Restless life of master Benvenuto. Historical story. - M.: New key, 2003.
- Fedorova E.V. People of beautiful France. - M.: Publishing house of Moscow State University, 2003.
- Fedorova E. V. Asia Minor: Millennium. Events. Creations. - M.: New key, 2004.
- Fedorova E.V. Traveling around Uzbekistan. - M.: New key, 2004.
- Fedorova E. V. Myths and Reality of Ancient Greece. - M.: Publishing house of Moscow State University, Nauka, 2005.
- Fedorova E. V., Lesnitskaya M. M. Naples and its environs. Century. People. Art. - M.: Publishing house of Moscow State University, Nauka, 2005.
- Fedorova E. V. Sicily. Century. People. Art. - M.: New key, 2005.
- Fedorova E. V. Visual-lecture course "Monuments of World History and Culture". List of transparencies and text to them. Part one. Greece and Italy. - M.: New key, 2006.
- Fedorova E. V. Man in the history of Western Europe. - M.: New key, 2007.
- Fedorova E. V. Man in the history of Western Europe. Part two. Rome - the Eternal City. - M.: New Key, 2007.
- Fedorova E. V. Old centuries of the history of Russia. - M.: Novy Klyuch, 2008.
- Fedorova E. V. Genuine Voices of Ancient Rome. - M.: New key, 2008. - 96 p.
- Fedorova E.V. Famous women of world history. - M.: New key, 2009.
- Fedorova E. V. The death of S. A. Yesenin - a regularity or an accident? - M.: New key, 2010.
- Fedorova E. V. Milan. Ages and people (Intelligence and stupidity as the driving forces of history). - M.: New key, 2010.
- Fedorova E.V. Episodes from the life of medieval Rome. - M.: Novy Klyuch, 2011.
- Fedorova E. V. The death of V. V. Mayakovsky - a regularity or an accident? - M.: New Key, 2011.
