= Michael Zhdanov =

Russian geophysicist

Michael Semenovich Zhdanov
- Education: PhD., Physics and Mathematics; DSc., Physics and Mathematics
- Alma mater: Moscow State University
- Occupation(s): Geophysicist, academic and author
- Scientific career
- Institutions: University of Utah; TechnoImaging

Michael Semenovich Zhdanov is a geophysicist, academic and author. He is a Distinguished Professor in the Department of Geology and Geophysics at the University of Utah, Director of the Consortium for Electromagnetic Modeling and Inversion (CEMI), as well as the Founder, chairman and CEO of TechnoImaging.

Zhdanov is most known for his work in geophysical inverse theory, ill-posed problem solutions, and electromagnetic methods. He has pioneered 3D inversion methods for geophysical data, extended migration principles to electromagnetic and potential fields, and also researched theoretical and applied geophysical electromagnetic methods. His publications comprise research articles and 16 books, including Geophysical Inverse Theory and Regularization Problems and Advanced Methods of Joint Inversion and Fusion of Multiphysics Data. He is the recipient of the 2009 University of Utah Distinguished Scholarly and Creative Research Award.

Zhdanov is a Fellow of the Electromagnetics Academy and an Honorary Member of the Society of Exploration Geophysicists. He is the Chief Editor of the Applied & Theoretical Geophysics section of the Arabian Journal of Geosciences and Editor-in-Chief of the Mineral Exploration Methods and Applications section of Minerals.

== Education and early career ==
Zhdanov earned a PhD in Physics and Mathematics in 1970, followed by a Doctor of Sciences degree in Physics and Mathematics in 1978, both from Moscow State University in Russia. Concurrently, he began his academic career, initially as an Assistant Professor and later Associate and Full Professor at Moscow Gubkin State University.

== Career ==
Zhdanov continued his academic work as an Honorary Professor of the Göttingen Academy of Sciences in 1990 and the China National Center of Geological Exploration Technology in 1997. He joined the University of Utah as a Full Professor in 1993 and was elected to the position of Distinguished Professor in the Department of Geology and Geophysics in 2016. Since 1995, he has been the Director of the Consortium for Electromagnetic Modeling and Inversion (CEMI), where he has worked on the broad application of inversion theory and non-seismic geophysical methods in industry.

In 1990, Zhdanov assumed the position of Founder and Director of the Geoelectromagnetic Research Institute of the Russian Academy of Science. In 2014, he was elected to the Governing Committee of the Oil and Gas Division of the European Association of Geoscientists and Engineers (EAGE) and has since chaired multiple organizing committees for EAGE conferences. Additionally, in 2005, he founded TechnoImaging, a University of Utah spin-off company specializing in advanced 3D imaging solutions for various geophysical methods in mineral, geothermal, oil and gas exploration, and environmental monitoring, and continues to serve as its chairman and CEO.

== Research ==
Zhdanov has contributed to the field of geophysics by developing geophysical inverse theory, advancing 3D electromagnetic modeling, migration, inversion techniques for airborne, ground, and marine electromagnetic and induced polarization methods, gravity and gravity gradiometry, magnetic and magnetic gradiometry, researching methods for 3D joint inversion of multiphysics data and extending migration principles from seismic methods to electromagnetic and potential fields.

=== Inverse theory ===
Zhdanov's work on inverse theory has focused on developing regularization methods. In his books Geophysical Inverse Theory and Regularization Problems and Inverse Theory and Applications in Geophysics, he presented modern geophysical inverse theory, providing unified solutions for ill-posed inverse problems in the framework of Tikhonov regularization. With his graduate student Oleg Portniaguine, he developed a 3D magnetic anomaly inversion method using Tikhonov regularization theory and validated it on synthetic and real airborne data. They introduced "focusing regularization" for high-resolution imaging of targets with sharp boundaries. These new methods were summarized in the monograph Geophysical Inverse Theory and Regularization Problems, published by him in 2002. Furthermore, he developed a new method for interpreting tensor gravity gradient data, improving geological target imaging and enhancing mineral exploration effectiveness.

In 2023, Zhdanov published Advanced Methods of Joint Inversion and Fusion of Multiphysics Data, exploring advanced methods and AI-aided techniques for integrating multiple data types in physics and geophysics to reduce uncertainty without relying on specific empirical relationships. He introduced the generalized joint inversion method of multimodal geophysical data using Gramian constraints. He also devised methods for multinary inversion, subsurface imaging, terrain correction, and joint inversion of multiple datasets.

=== Electromagnetic methods ===
Zhdanov has also researched electromagnetic inverse theory throughout his career. In a collaborative study, he introduced a new method for accurate 3D electromagnetic modeling and inversion in complex structures with variable background conductivity, ideal for marine controlled-source data, along with a method for more efficient interpretation of marine controlled-source electromagnetic (MCSEM) data in offshore petroleum exploration. In addition, he and his graduate student Hongzhu Cai presented a method using virtual receivers to improve sensitivity in analyzing controlled-source electromagnetic (CSEM) data. Later, alongside Leif Cox, he developed an advanced method of 3D inversion of large-scale geophysical survey data using a moving sensitivity domain approach. They also showcased a method to extract induced polarization properties from airborne electromagnetic (EM) data.

Zhdanov discussed electrical methods in applied geophysics, including Direct Current, Magnetotelluric, and Controlled-Source Electromagnetic techniques, in the book The Geoelectrical Methods in Geophysical Exploration. Subsequently, he authored Geophysical Electromagnetic Theory and Methods and Foundations of Geophysical Electromagnetic Theory and Methods demonstrating advanced electromagnetic (EM) theories and methods for geophysical exploration, highlighting advances and practical applications. He also developed the generalized effective-medium theory of induced polarization (IP), which links the mineral composition of the rocks and the IP effect. This can be used for subsurface material characterization, mineral discrimination and hydrocarbon reservoir characterization, based on electromagnetic methods. His work led to developments in this area, which he patented, including methods for real-time subsurface imaging from moving platforms remote exploration for resources using long-range stationary transmitters, electromagnetic migration imaging, gradient electromagnetic induction well logging, mineral exploration and discrimination based on electromagnetic methods, and broad-band electromagnetic holographic imaging.

== Awards and honors ==
- 2002 – Fellow, Electromagnetics Academy
- 2009 – Distinguished Scholarly and Creative Research Award, University of Utah
- 2013 – Honorary Member, Society of Exploration Geophysicists
- 2018 – Albert Nelson Marquis Lifetime Achievement Award, Marquis Who's Who
- 2024 – Inaugural Highly Ranked Scholar Lifetime, ScholarGPS

== Bibliography ==
=== Selected books ===
- Integral Transforms in Geophysics (1988) ISBN 978-3642726309
- The Geoelectrical Methods in Geophysical Exploration (1994) ISBN 978-0444896780
- Geophysical Inverse Theory and Regularization Problems (2002) ISBN 978-0444510891
- Geophysical Electromagnetic Theory and Methods (2009) ISBN 978-0444529633
- Inverse Theory and Applications in Geophysics (2015) ISBN 978-0444626745
- Foundations of Geophysical Electromagnetic Theory and Methods (2018) ISBN 978-0444638908
- Advanced Methods of Joint Inversion and Fusion of Multiphysics Data (2023) ISBN 978-9819967216

=== Selected articles ===
- Portniaguine, O., & Zhdanov, M. S. (1999). Focusing geophysical inversion images. Geophysics, 64(3), 874–887.
- Portniaguine, O., & Zhdanov, M. S. (2002). 3-D magnetic inversion with data compression and image focusing. Geophysics, 67(5), 1532–1541.
- Zhdanov, M. S., Ellis, R., & Mukherjee, S. (2004). Three-dimensional regularized focusing inversion of gravity gradient tensor component data. Geophysics, 69(4), 925–937.
- Zhdanov, M. S., Lee, S. K., & Yoshioka, K. (2006). Integral equation method for 3D modeling of electromagnetic fields in complex structures with inhomogeneous background conductivity. Geophysics, 71(6), G333-G345.
- Zhdanov, M.S. (2008) Generalized effective-medium theory of induced polarization: Geophysics, 73(5), F197-F211.
- Zhdanov, M.S., Gribenko, A., & Wilson, G. (2012) Generalized joint inversion of multimodal geophysical data using Gramian constraints: Geophysical Research Letters, 39(9), L09301.
- Zhdanov, M. S., Wan, L., & Jorgensen, M. (2024). Joint Three-Dimensional Inversion of Gravity and Magnetic Data Collected in the Area of Victoria Mine, Nevada, Using the Gramian Constraints. Minerals, 14(3), 292.
