= Uliana Malashenko =

Investigative reporting journalist

- Ульяна Малашенко
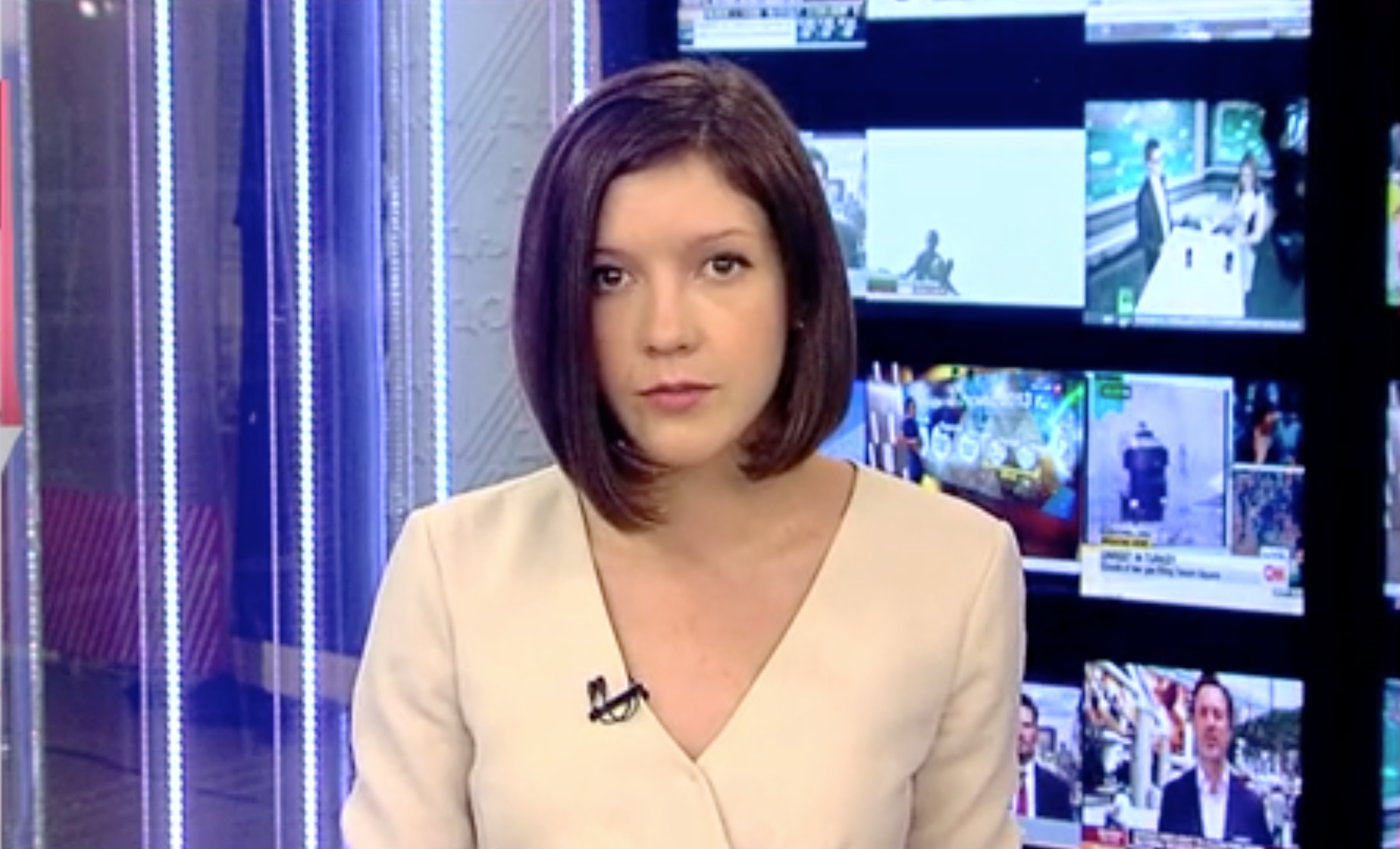
- Uliana Malashenko in a live broadcast
- Education: Columbia Journalism School
- Occupation: Journalist

Uliana Malashenko is a journalist, specializing in live and investigative reporting.

== Education and early journalistic career ==
Malashenko has a master's degree in journalism from Lomonosov Moscow State University, which she received in 2011. While still a student at MSU, she reported for Expert TV, RBC TV and Kommersant FM. In 2013, she became a news correspondent and host of TV Rain news show, Here and Now. Through the early years of her journalistic career, Uliana faced a lot of pressure from government authorities while covering high-profile political stories. As a result, she was subjected to house visits by local police forces. At another point, while on assignment for Kommersant FM, she was covering the environmentalist protests in Khimki forest. Together with other journalists, she was assaulted by Russian law enforcement agents, resulting in a brain concussion and hospitalization. These and other events ultimately contributed to her decision to relocate and continue her journalistic career in the United States.

In the fall of 2021, Uliana Malashenko graduated from Columbia Journalism School where she specialized in developing beat-specific expertise in national politics, U.S. elections and investigative journalism. Since March 2022, she has been working as a misinformation reporter for Lead Stories, a US-based media company specializing in identifying and debunking false claims on social media.

== Current publications and contributions ==
Malashenko is a bilingual writer, contributing to several digital media publications, with articles published in English and Russian. She covers significant topics of public interest, ranging from current events such as presidential and mayoral elections in the US and Russia, to devastation caused by hurricanes Harvey and Irma. She interviewed a NASA official, Bob Jacobs, about space collaboration between the US and Russia, and reported on the 2017 solar eclipse in the US. Her article profiling multiple survivors of the HIV epidemic was published on 2017 World AIDS Day. Throughout 2016 and most of 2017, Malashenko actively participated in Russian historical event project, contributing to Mikhail Zygar's high-profile "Project 1917" which received coverage in online media from CNN and others.

Malashenko presently works with domestic and international online and on-air publications, including Washington Babylon, The National Interest, Snob.ru, Business FM, and Batenka.
