= Anatoly Bokschanin =

Soviet scholar and professor (1903–1979)

Anatoly Georgiyevich Bokschanin (28 March 1903, Moscow – 24 January 1979, Moscow) was a Soviet scholar of classical antiquity. He was a Doctor of Sciences and Professor of the Moscow University.

Bokschanin researched the political history of the Roman Empire of the 1st century AD and Roman–Parthian relations. He penned several scholar publications and authored and edited several textbooks on Roman history. His major works include "Иудейские восстания II в. н.э." ("Judean Revolts of the 2nd century AD", 1950), "Социальный кризис Римской империи в I в. н.э." ("Social Crisis of the Roman Empire in the 1st century AD", 1954), Парфия и Рим (Parthia and Rome, in two parts, 1960) and "Источниковедение Древнего Рима" ("The Source Studies of Ancient Rome", 1981). Two articles about Bokschanin appeared in the Russian Journal of Ancient History (1973, issue 4, p. 198 and 1979, issue 4).
