= Nikolay Kropachev =

Rector of Saint Petersburg State University

- Николай Кропачев
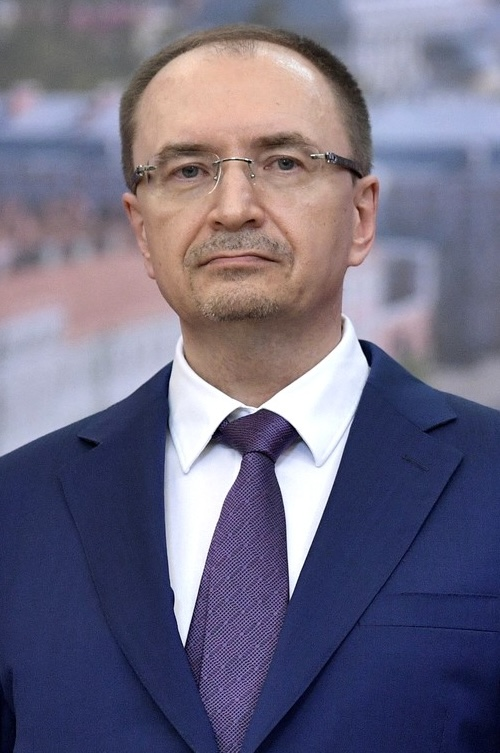
- Kropachev in 2019
- Born: Nikolay Mikhailovich Kropachev; 8 February 1959 (age 67); Leningrad, Soviet Union (now Saint Petersburg, Russia)
- Known for: 44th Rector of Saint Petersburg State University (2008–); 1st President of the Charter Court of Saint Petersburg (2000–2005)
- Spouse: Natalya Shatikhina (div. 2022)
- Awards: Order "For Merit to the Fatherland" (2009, 2014, 2024); Order of Alexander Nevsky (2019); Order of the Rising Sun (2016); Order of Honour (2004); Medal "In Commemoration of the 300th Anniversary of Saint Petersburg" (2003)

Academic background
- Education: Saint Petersburg State University (Specialist, Candidate of Sciences, Doctor of Sciences)
- Thesis: The Mechanism of Criminal Law Regulation (2000)

Academic work
- Discipline: Criminal law, criminology
- Institutions: Saint Petersburg State University; Russian Academy of Sciences
- Main interests: Jurisprudence, criminal law

Nikolay Mikhailovich Kropachev (Russian: Николай Михайлович Кропачев; born February 8, 1959) is a Russian scholar of criminal law, who has served as the 44th Rector of Saint Petersburg State University since 2008. He is a Corresponding Member of the Russian Academy of Sciences and holds the academic rank of Professor and a doctoral degree in law.

== Biography ==
Kropachev graduated from the law faculty of the Andrei Zhdanov Leningrad State University in 1981 and competed postgraduate studies in the same university in 1984. During his time in postgraduate school, he joined the Communist Party of the Soviet Union.

Since 1985, he has successively worked at the Criminal Law Department as an assistant lecturer, senior lecturer, and associate professor (docent).

In 1992, Kropachev headed the special faculty for the personnel development in legal sciences, from which notable Russian politicians Igor Artemyev and Sergey Mironov have graduated.

In 1998, Kropachev initiated the first law-school clinic in Russia. The same year, he was elected dean of the Saint Petersburg State University Faculty of Law. In 2000 he obtained a Doctor of Sciences degree in law by defending a thesis titled "The Mechanism of Criminal Law Regulation" and in 2003 he became full professor at the Criminal Law Department.

From 2000 to 2005, he headed the newly established Charter Court of Saint Petersburg, a single instance court meant to hear cases relating to conformity with the Charter of Saint Petersburg of regional law adopted by the Legislative Assembly of Saint Petersburg and decrees of the Governor of Saint Petersburg.

From 2001 to 2010, Kropachev headed the Criminal Law Department. In 2006–2008, he concurrently served as the university's First Vice-Rector.

On May 21, 2008, Professor Nikolay Kropachev succeeded Lyudmila Verbitskaya as the Rector of Saint Petersburg State University.

In 2016, he joined the United Russia political party.

In March 2022, Kropachev signed a letter of support for the Russian invasion of Ukraine. Since June 2022, he has been sanctioned by the Ukrainian presidential decree. The same year, the Anti-Corruption Foundation put Kropachev on its list of bribe-takers and warmongers. The Free Russia Forum also included Kropachev in its "Putin's List".

Since 2023, he has been a member of the Presidium of the Saint Petersburg Branch of the Russian Academy of Sciences.

He was a trusted person of Vladimir Putin during his 2024 presidential campaign.

== Awards ==
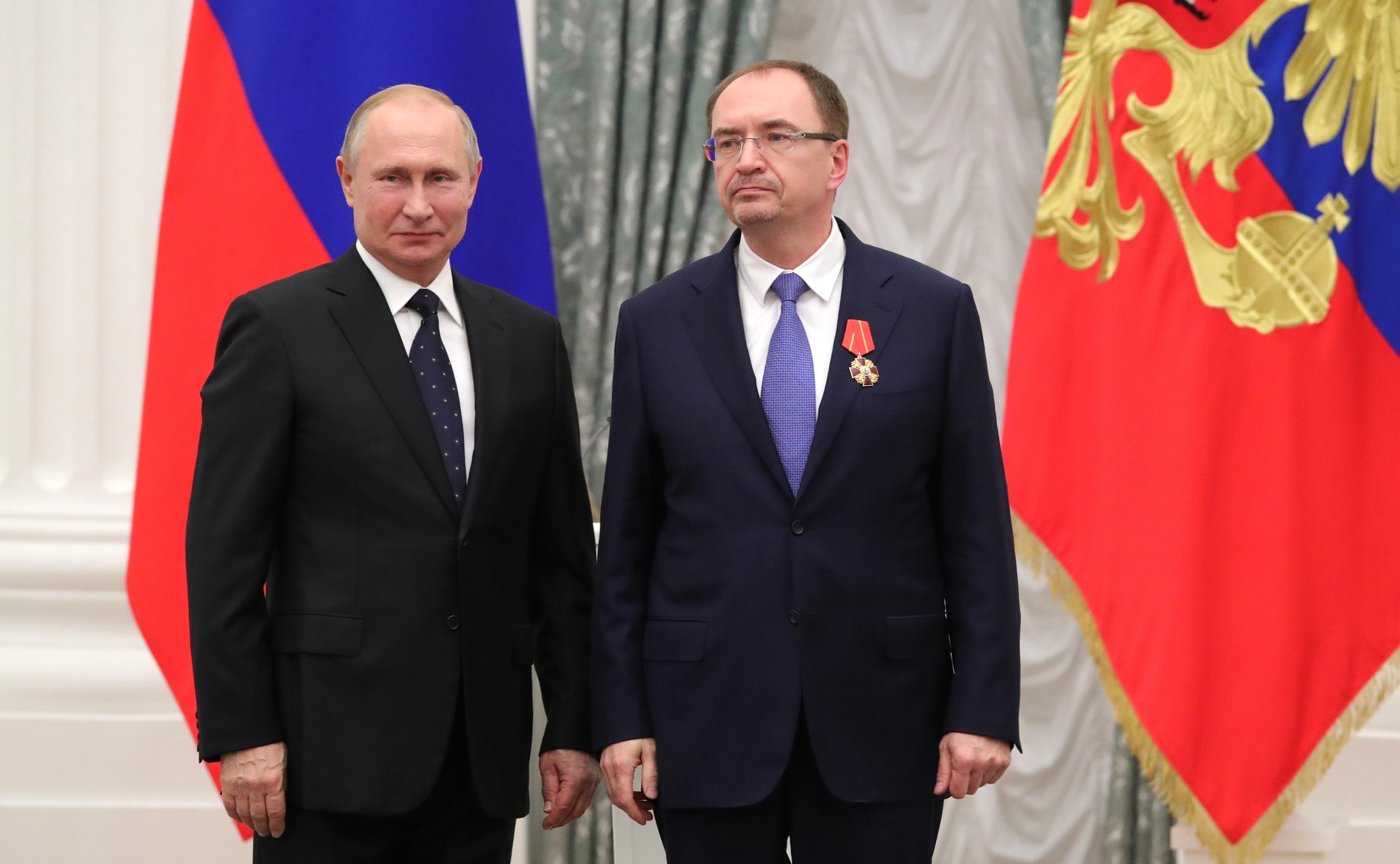
Kropachev, awarded with Order of Alexander Nevsky, and Russian president Vladimir Putin, November 2019

- Russia: Order "For Merit to the Fatherland":
  - 2nd class (2024)
  - 3rd class (2014)
  - 4th class (2009)
- Republic of Karelia: Medal "For Merit to the Republic of Karelia"
- Russia: Order of Alexander Nevsky (2019)
- (South Korea) Republic of Korea: Honorary Citizen of Seoul (2019)
- Japan: Order of the Rising Sun, 3rd class (2016)
- Russia: Order of Honour (2004)
- Russia: Medal "In Commemoration of the 300th Anniversary of Saint Petersburg" (2003)

Academic offices
| Preceded by Lyudmila Verbitskaya (1994–2008) | Rector of Saint Petersburg State University; 2008–present | Succeeded by Incumbent |
