= Saint Petersburg State University =

Public research university in Russia

Coordinates: 59.9420°N 30.2990°E

- Санкт-Петербургский государственный университет
- Latin: Universitas Petropolitana
- Other name: St Petersburg University
- Former name: List: Petersburg Pedagogical Institute (1804–1814) Main Pedagogical Institute (1814–1819) Saint Petersburg University (1819–1821) Saint Petersburg Imperial University (1821–1914) Petrograd Imperial University (1914–1918) Petrograd State University (1918–1924) Leningrad State University (1924–1991)
- Motto: Hic tuta perennat (Latin)
- Motto in English: Here all in safety lasts
- Type: Public
- Established: 1724; 302 years ago
- Affiliations: APSIA, BRICS Universities League, Campus Europae
- Rector: Nikolay Kropachev
- Administrative staff: 13,000
- Students: 32,400
- Undergraduates: 26,872
- Postgraduates: 5,566
- Location: 7/9 Universitetskaya Emb., 199034, Saint Petersburg, Russia
- Campus: Urban and suburban
- Colours: Terracotta and gray
- Mascot: Boris the Funny Looking Owl
- Website: english.spbu.ru

Saint Petersburg State University (SPbU; Russian: Санкт-Петербургский государственный университет, romanized: Sankt-Peterburgskiy gosudarstvennyy universitet) is a public research university in Saint Petersburg, Russia. Founded in 1724 by a decree of Peter the Great, it is one of the oldest universities in Russia and has had a focus on fundamental research in science and engineering since its creation.

It is made up of 24 distinct departments and institutes, the Academic Gymnasium, the Medical College, the College of Physical Culture and Sports, Economics and Technology. The university has two primary campuses: one on Vasilievsky Island and the other one in Peterhof. During the Soviet period, it was known as Leningrad State University (Russian: Ленинградский государственный университет). It was renamed after Andrei Zhdanov in 1948 and was officially called "Leningrad State University, named after A. A. Zhdanov and decorated with the Order of Lenin and the Order of the Red Banner of Labour." Zhdanov was removed in 1989, and Leningrad in the name was officially replaced with Saint Petersburg in 1992.

== History ==
=== 1724–1821 ===
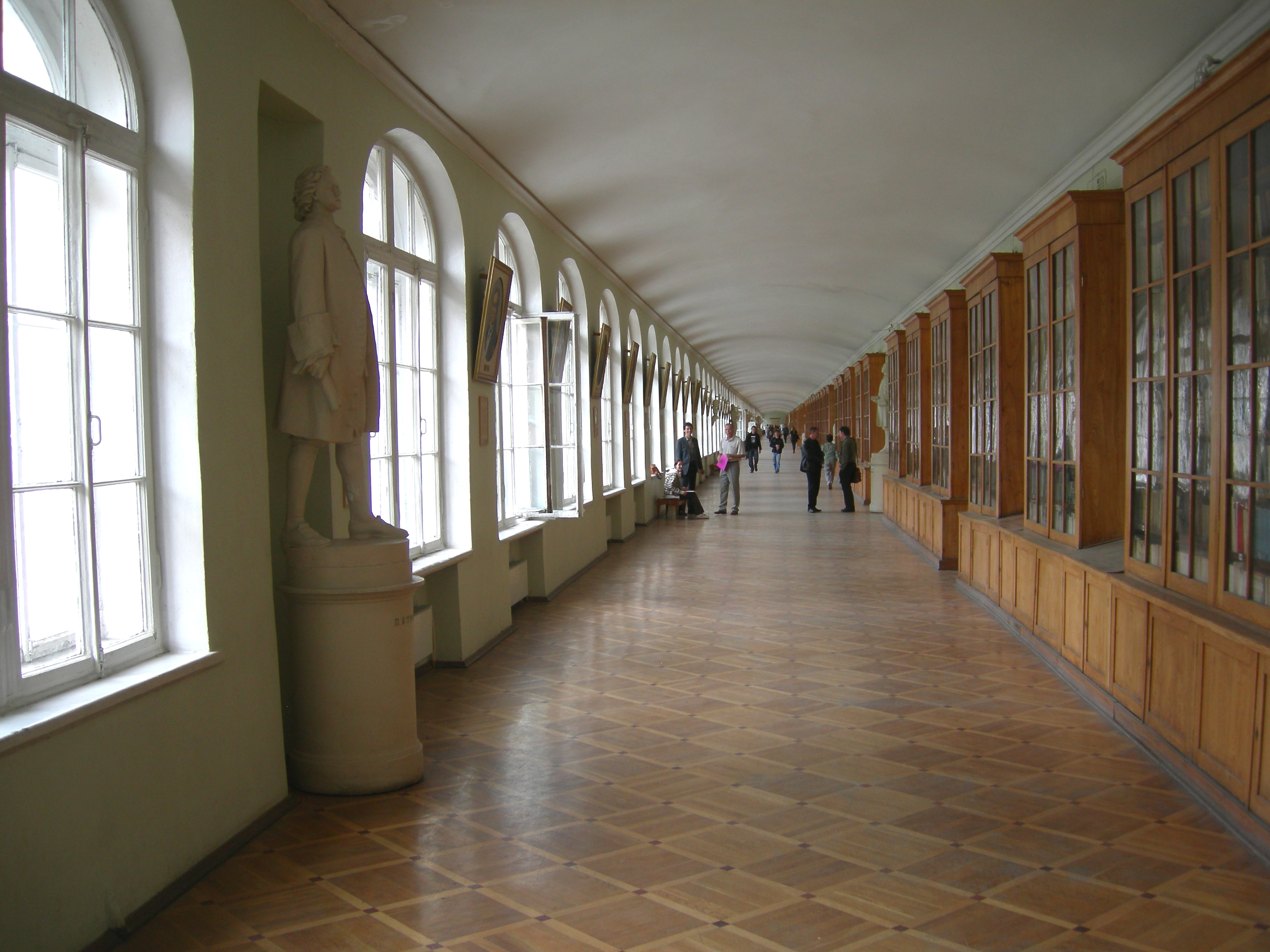
Hallway in the Twelve Collegia building

It is disputed by the university administration whether Saint Petersburg State University or Moscow State University is the oldest higher education institution in Russia. While the latter was established in 1755, the former, which has been in continuous operation since 1819, claims to be the successor of the university established along with the Academic Gymnasium and the Saint Petersburg Academy of Sciences on 24 January 1724, by a decree of Peter the Great.

Between 1804 and 1819, Saint Petersburg University officially did not exist; the institution founded by Peter the Great, the Saint Petersburg Academy, had been disbanded, because the new 1803 charter of the Academy of Sciences stipulated that there should not be any educational institutions affiliated with it.

The Petersburg Pedagogical Institute, renamed the Main Pedagogical Institute in 1814, was established in 1804 and resided in a part of the Twelve Collegia building. On 8 February 1819 (O.S.), Alexander I of Russia reorganized the Main Pedagogical Institute into Saint Petersburg University, which at that time consisted of three faculties: Faculty of Philosophy and Law, Faculty of History and Philology and Faculty of Physics and Mathematics. The Main Pedagogical Institute (where Dmitri Mendeleev studied) was restored in 1828 as an educational institution independent of Saint Petersburg University, and trained teachers until it was finally closed in 1859.

=== 1821–1917 ===
In 1821, the university was renamed Saint Petersburg Imperial University. In 1823, most of the university moved from the Twelve Collegia to the southern part of the city. In 1824, a modified version of the charter of Moscow University was adopted as the first charter of the Saint Petersburg Imperial University. In 1829, there were 19 full professors and 169 full-time and part-time students at the university. In 1830, Tsar Nicholas returned the entire building of the Twelve Collegia to the university, and courses resumed there.

In 1835, a new Charter of the Imperial Universities of Russia was approved. It provided for the establishment of the Faculty of Law, the Faculty of History and Philology, and the Faculties of Physics and Mathematics, which were merged into the Faculty of Philosophy as the 1st and 2nd Departments, respectively.

In 1849, after the Spring of Nations, the Senate of the Russian Empire decreed the rector should be appointed by the minister of national enlightenment rather than elected by the Assembly of the university. However, Pyotr Pletnyov was reappointed rector and ultimately became the longest-serving rector of Saint Petersburg University (1840–61).

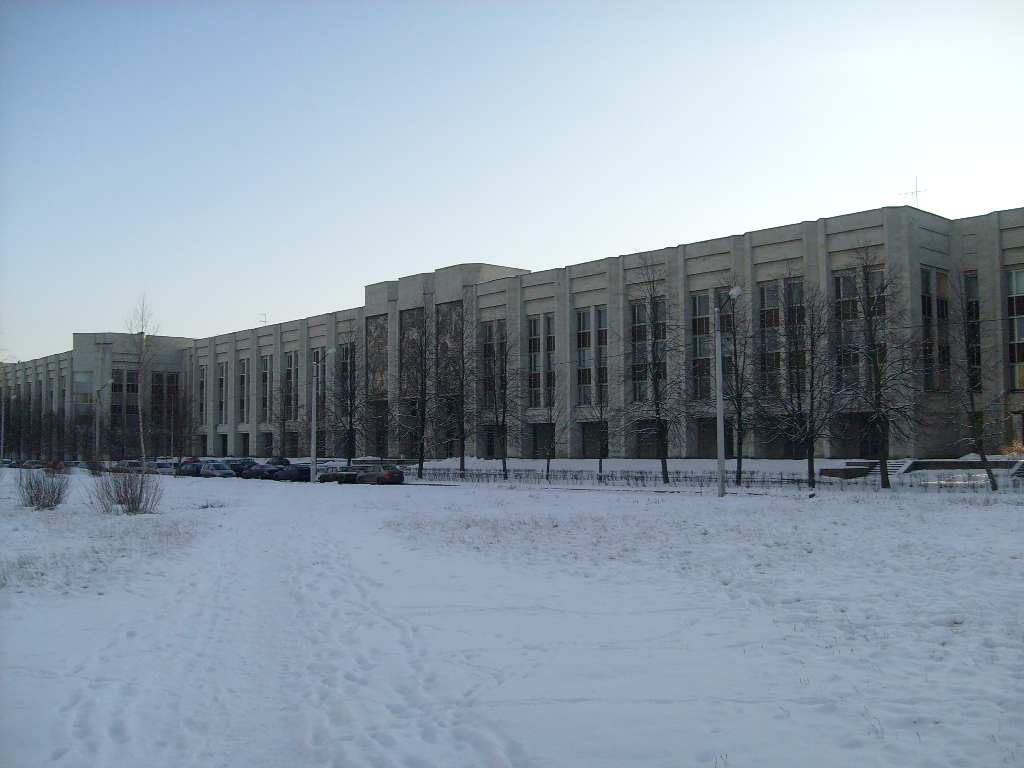
The Faculty of Mathematics and Mechanics in Peterhof

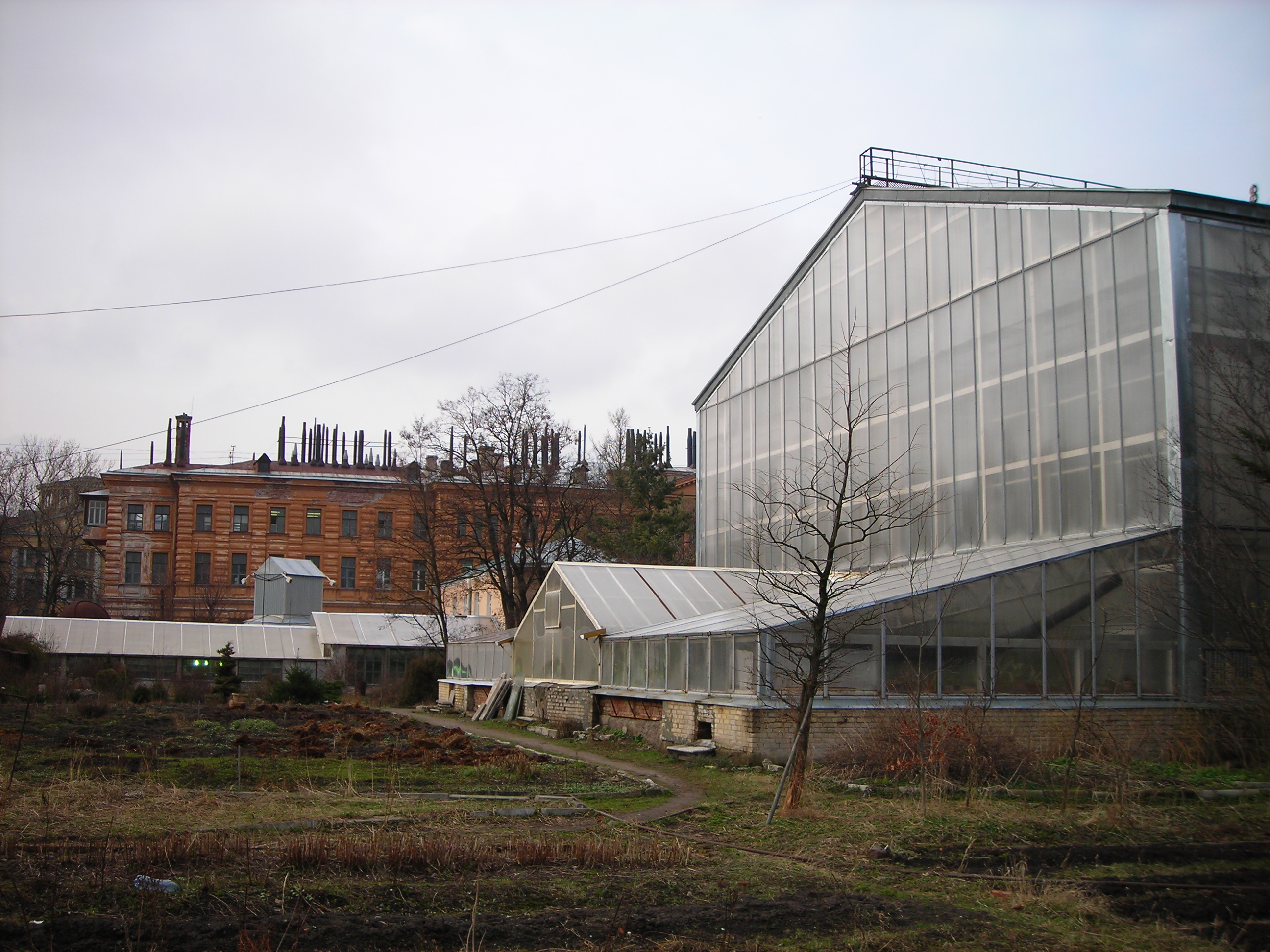
Botanical garden

In 1855, Oriental studies were separated from the Faculty of History and Philology, and the fourth faculty, Faculty of Oriental Languages, was formally inaugurated on 27 August 1855.

In 1859–61, female part-time students could attend lectures in the university. In 1861, there were 1,270 full-time and 167 part-time students in the university, of them 498 were in the Faculty of Law, the largest subdivision. But this subdivision had the cameral studies department, where students learnt safety, occupational health and environmental engineering management and science, including chemistry, biology, agronomy along with law and philosophy. Many Russian, Georgian etc. managers, engineers and scientists studied at the Faculty of law therefore. During 1861–62, there was student unrest in the university, and it was temporarily closed twice during the year. The students were denied freedom of assembly and placed under police surveillance, and public lectures were forbidden. Many students were expelled. After the unrest, in 1865 only 524 students remained.

A decree of the Emperor Alexander II of Russia adopted on 18 February 1863, restored the right of the university assembly to elect the rector. It also formed the new faculty of the theory and history of art as part of the faculty of history and philology.

In March 1869, student unrest shook the university again, but on a smaller scale. By 1869, 2,588 students had graduated from the university.

In 1880, the Ministry of National Enlightenment forbade students to marry and married persons could not be admitted. In 1882, another student unrest took place in the university. In 1884, a new Charter of the Imperial Russian Universities was adopted, which granted the right to appoint the rector to the minister of national enlightenment again. On 1 March 1887 (O.S.), a group of the university students was arrested while planning an attempt on the life of Alexander III of Russia. As a result, new admission rules to gymnasiums and universities were approved by the minister of national enlightenment Ivan Delyanov in 1887, which barred persons of non-noble origin from admission to the university, unless they were extraordinarily talented.

By 1894, 9,212 students had graduated from the university. Among the scholars of the second half of the 19th century, affiliated with the university were mathematician Pafnuty Chebyshev, physicist Heinrich Lenz, chemists Dmitri Mendeleev and Aleksandr Butlerov, embryologist Alexander Kovalevsky, physiologist Ivan Sechenov and pedologist Vasily Dokuchaev. On 24 March 1896 (O.S.), on the campus of the university, Alexander Popov publicly demonstrated transmission of radio waves for the first time in history.

As of 1 January 1900 (O.S.), there were nearly 2,100 students enrolled in the Faculty of Law, 1,149 students in the Faculty of Physics and Mathematics, 212 students in the Faculty of Oriental Languages and 171 students in the Faculty of History and Philology. In 1902, the first student dining hall in Russia was opened in the university.

Since about 1897, regular strikes and student unrest shook the university and spread to other institutions of higher education across Russia. During the Revolution of 1905, the charter of the Russian universities was amended once more; the autonomy of the universities was partially restored and the right to elect the rector was returned to the academic board for the first time since 1884. In 1905–06, the university was temporarily closed due to student unrest. Its autonomy was revoked again in 1911. In the same year, the university was once again temporarily closed.

In 1914, with the start of the First World War, the university was renamed Petrograd Imperial University after its namesake city. During the War, the university was the center of mobilization of Russian intellectual resources and scholarship for the war effort. In 1915, a branch of the university was opened in Perm, which later became Perm State University.

=== 1918–1939 ===
The Assembly of Petrograd Imperial University openly welcomed the February Revolution of 1917, which put an end to the Russian monarchy, and the university came to be known as Petrograd University. However, after the October Revolution of 1917, the university's staff and administration were initially vocally opposed to the Bolshevik takeover of power and reluctant to cooperate with the Narkompros. Later in 1917–22, during the Russian Civil War, some of the staff suspected of counter-revolutionary sympathies suffered imprisonment (e.g., Lev Shcherba in 1919), execution, or exile abroad on the so-called Philosophers' ships in 1922 (e.g., Nikolai Lossky). Furthermore, the entire staff suffered from hunger and extreme poverty during those years.

In 1918, the university was renamed 1st Petrograd State University, and in 1919 the Narkompros merged it with the 2nd PSU (former Psychoneurological Institute) and 3rd PSU (former Bestuzhev Higher Courses for Women) into Petrograd State University. In 1919, the Faculty of Social Science was established by the Narkompros instead of the Faculty of History and Philology, Faculty of Oriental Languages and Faculty of Law. Nicholas Marr became the first Dean of the new faculty. Chemist Alexey Favorsky became the dean of the Faculty of Physics and Mathematics. Rabfaks and free university courses were opened on the basis of the university to provide mass education.

In the fall of 1920, as observed by freshman student Alice Rosenbaum (Ayn Rand), enrollment was open and the majority of the students were anti-communist including, until removed, a few vocal opponents of the regime. Seeing they were educating "class enemies", a purge was conducted in 1922 based on the class background of the students, and all students, other than seniors, with a bourgeois background were expelled.

In 1924, the university was renamed Leningrad State University after its namesake city. In order to suppress intellectual opposition to Soviet power, a number of historians working in the university, including Sergey Platonov, Yevgeny Tarle, and Boris Grekov, were imprisoned in the so-called Academic Affair of 1929–30 on fabricated charges of participating in a counter-revolutionary conspiracy aimed at overthrowing the government. Some other members of the staff were repressed in 1937–38 during the Great Purge.

=== 1940–1999 ===
During the 1941–44 Siege of Leningrad in World War II, many students and staff died from starvation, in battles, or from repressions. The university evacuated to Saratov in 1942–44. A branch of the university was in Yelabuga during the war. In 1944, the Presidium of the Supreme Council of the Soviet Union awarded the university the Order of Lenin. In 1948, the Soviet Council of Ministers named the university after Andrei Zhdanov, a deceased Communist official. This decision was revoked in 1989 during Perestroika.

In 1949–50, several professors died in prison during the investigation of the Leningrad Affair fabricated by the central Soviet leadership, and the minister of education of the RSFSR, former rector Alexander Voznesensky, was executed.

In 1966, the Council of Ministers decided to build a suburban campus in Petrodvorets for most of the mathematics and natural science faculties. The relocation of the faculties was completed by the 1990s. In 1969, the Presidium of the Supreme Council of the Soviet Union awarded the university the Order of the Red Banner of Labour. In 1991, the university was renamed back to Saint Petersburg State University after its namesake city. The university educated Russian presidents Vladimir Putin and Dimitry Medvedev, both of whom studied law at the university.

=== 2000–present ===
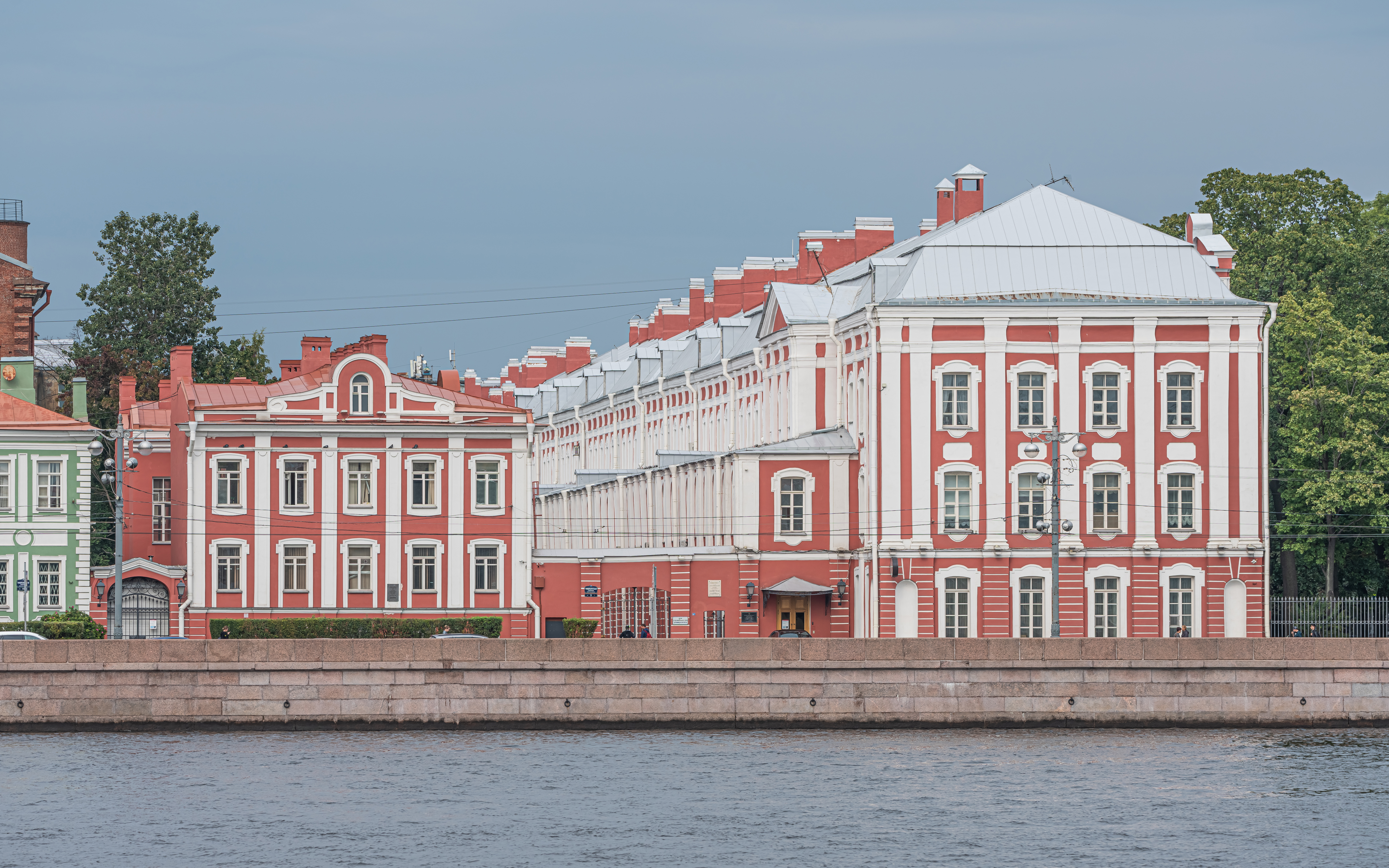
The Twelve Collegia building on Vasilievsky Island, the university's main building and the seat of administration

Rector Nikolay Kropachev has signed a letter of support for the Russian invasion of Ukraine.

In early 2022, the university expelled 13 students who had protested against the 2022 Russian invasion of Ukraine.

In response to the Russian invasion, in March 2022 the Hamburg University of Applied Sciences and University of Bremen suspended their longstanding relationships with the university, Dartmouth College stopped running its Russian language study abroad program in the university, and CEMS - The Global Alliance in Management Education suspended its partnership with the Graduate School of Management in St Petersburg. In addition, the European Coimbra Group expelled the university, and the European University Association suspended the school. The Council on International Educational Exchange stopped its programs at the university, and relocated students to other non-Russian universities.

== Admissions ==
Admission to Saint Petersburg State University is competitive. Undergraduate admissions for domestic state funded students are decided through the Unified State Exam. The average Unified State Examination score of applicants to the university in 2023 was 90 points (out of a possible 100). In the 2023 admission campaign, more than 106,000 domestic students applied to the university for bachelor's and specialist programs, with only 4,617 being accepted. The same year, over 21,000 international students from 100 different countries applied to the university for state-funded scholarship programs, with only 1,000 being accepted. This reflects an overall acceptance rate of around 4% for both domestic students and international students studying on scholarships.

== Organization ==
=== Governance ===
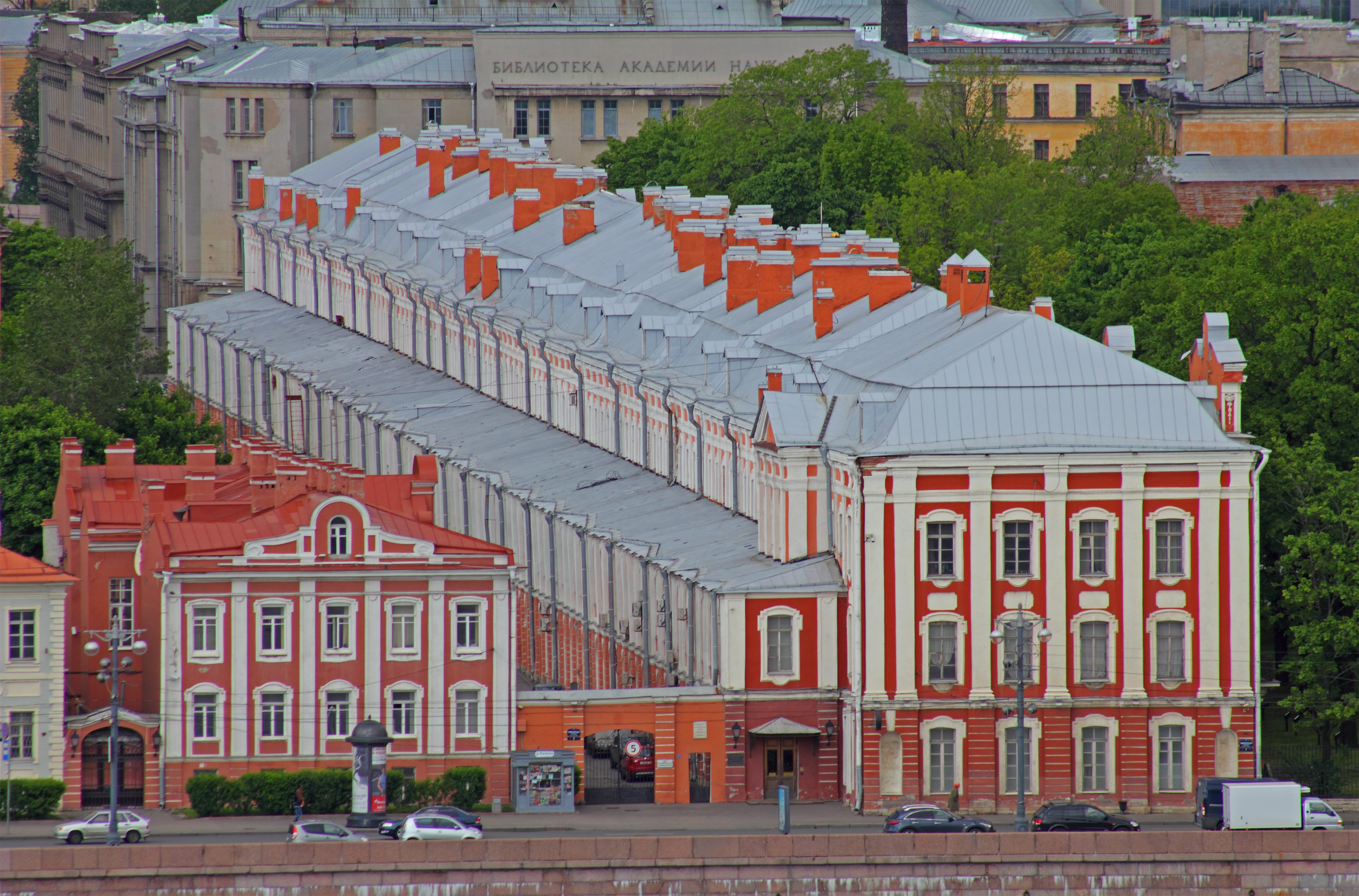
The Twelve Collegia Building

The university is a federal state institution of higher education managed by the government of the Russian Federation. It has 24 faculties and institutes which are further subdivided into departments, and other main structural subdivisions.

The superior body of self-government of the university is its Assembly, which elects the rector and the Academic Board of the university for a five-year term. The Assembly consists of the members of the Academic Board of the university and the staff delegated by the general assemblies of the main structural subdivisions according to quotas set by the Academic Board of the university. The general administration of the university is vested in the Academic Board, which consists of the rector, who presides over it, as well as the president of the university, vice rectors and representatives of the main structural subdivisions.

Likewise, the general administration of a faculty is vested in its respective academic board elected by the faculty assembly for five years. The procedure of election and department quotas are decided by the faculty-level academic board itself. The dean, who leads the faculty and presides over its academic board, is elected for five years by the faculty academic board.

=== Academic year ===
The academic year in St. Petersburg State University according to the Routine Regulations normally starts on 1 September. One lesson normally lasts an hour and a half (two academic hours). The academic year is divided into two semesters. The first semester (term) ends by late December, the second starts in mid-February and lasts until late May. Each term is followed by a series of preliminary tests (in the last week of December/May) and exams (in January/June).

=== Campuses ===
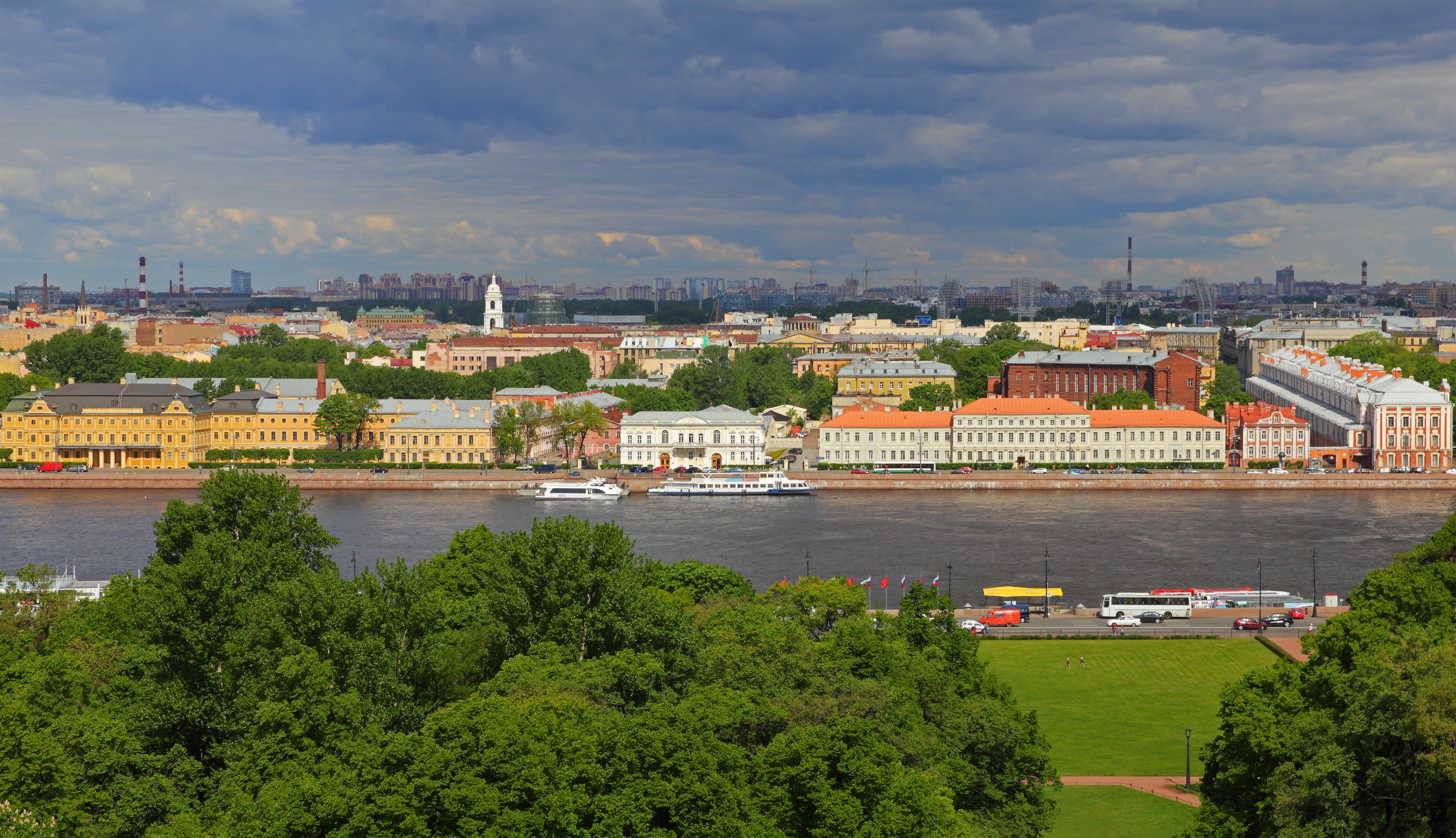
View of the university from Saint Isaac's Cathedral.

The university has two main campuses: on Vasilievsky Island in the historic city center and in Peterhof (formerly Petrodvorets), a southwestern suburb, which can be reached by railway from the city's Baltiysky Rail Terminal. The main building of the university, Twelve Collegia, is on Vasilievsky Island and includes the Library, the Faculty of Biology and the Institute of Earth Sciences. The Faculty of Philology and the Faculty of Oriental Studies share the nearby 18th-century Petrine Baroque building on Universitetskaya Embankment of the Bolshaya Neva, designed by Domenico Trezzini and originally built as the Palace of Peter II of Russia. The New Gostiny Dvor designed by Giacomo Quarenghi and built in the 19th century in that part of the island is occupied by the Institute of History, Institute of Philosophy. The Faculty of Psychology is in front of it on Admiral Makarov Embankment of the Malaya Neva. The Graduate School of Management, School of Journalism and Mass Communications, Faculty of Medicine, Faculty of Dentistry and Medical Technologies, Faculty of Law and Faculty of Military Studies are on Vasilievsky Island, but farther to the west. Four other social science faculties are east of the city center on the southern bank of the Neva: the Faculty of Economics is not far from the Chernyshevskaya metro station, while the Faculty of Sociology, Faculty of Political Science and the School of International Relations occupy historical buildings of Smolny Convent.

The new suburban campus consists of the Faculty of Applied Mathematics and Control Processes, Institute of Chemistry, Faculty of Mathematics and Mechanics, and Faculty of Physics, which are in modern buildings in Peterhof. Nearby the Peterhof campus there is a park area called Sergievka. In the Sergievka park there are abandoned buildings of the Faculty of Biology.

=== Faculties and Institutes ===
SPbSU is made up of 24 specialized faculties, which are:

- Faculty of Applied Mathematics and Control Processes (*rus | *eng Archived 14 October 2017 at the Wayback Machine)
- Faculty of Biology (*rus)
- Institute of Chemistry
- Faculty of Dentistry and Medical Technology (*rus)
- Faculty of Economics (*rus)
- Institute of Earth Sciences (*rus Archived 1 September 2014 at the Wayback Machine)
- Institute of History (*rus)
- School of International Relations (*rus)
- Faculty of Law
- Faculty of Liberal Arts and Sciences (*rus | *eng)
- Saint Petersburg State University Mathematics and Mechanics Faculty (*rus | *eng)
- Faculty of Medicine (*rus)
- Faculty of Oriental Studies (*rus | *eng)
- Faculty of Arts(*rus | *eng Archived 3 December 2013 at the Wayback Machine)
- Faculty of Philology (*rus | *eng)
- Institute of Philosophy (*rus | *eng)
- Faculty of Physics (*rus | *eng)
- Faculty of Political Science (*rus) (*rus | *eng Archived 2 December 2023 at the Wayback Machine)
- Faculty of Psychology (*rus | *eng)
- Faculty of Sociology (*rus)
- Graduate School of Management
- Military Faculty (*rus Archived 24 January 2017 at the Wayback Machine)
- School of Journalism and Mass Communications (*rus | *eng)
  - Faculty of Applied Communications
  - Faculty of Journalism

There is also a Department of Physical Culture and Sports. (*rus)

== International collaboration ==
The university is a member of the University of the Arctic. UArctic is an international cooperative network based in the Circumpolar Arctic region, consisting of more than 200 universities, colleges, and other organizations with an interest in promoting education and research in the Arctic region. The collaboration has been paused after the beginning of the Russo-Ukrainian War in 2022.

== Rankings ==
University rankings

Global – Overall
- ARWU World: 301-400 (2022)
- QS World: 375 (2026)
- THE World: 801-1000 (2023)
- USNWR Global: 652 (2023)

Regional – Overall
- QS Emerging Europe and Central Asia: 3 (2022)

In international rankings, the university was ranked 35th by The Three University Missions Ranking in 2022, 242nd by the QS World University Rankings in 2022, 652nd by U.S. News & World Report in 2023, 601-800th by the Times Higher Education World University Rankings, and 301–400th by the Academic Ranking of World Universities in 2021.

== Notable people ==
=== Politics ===
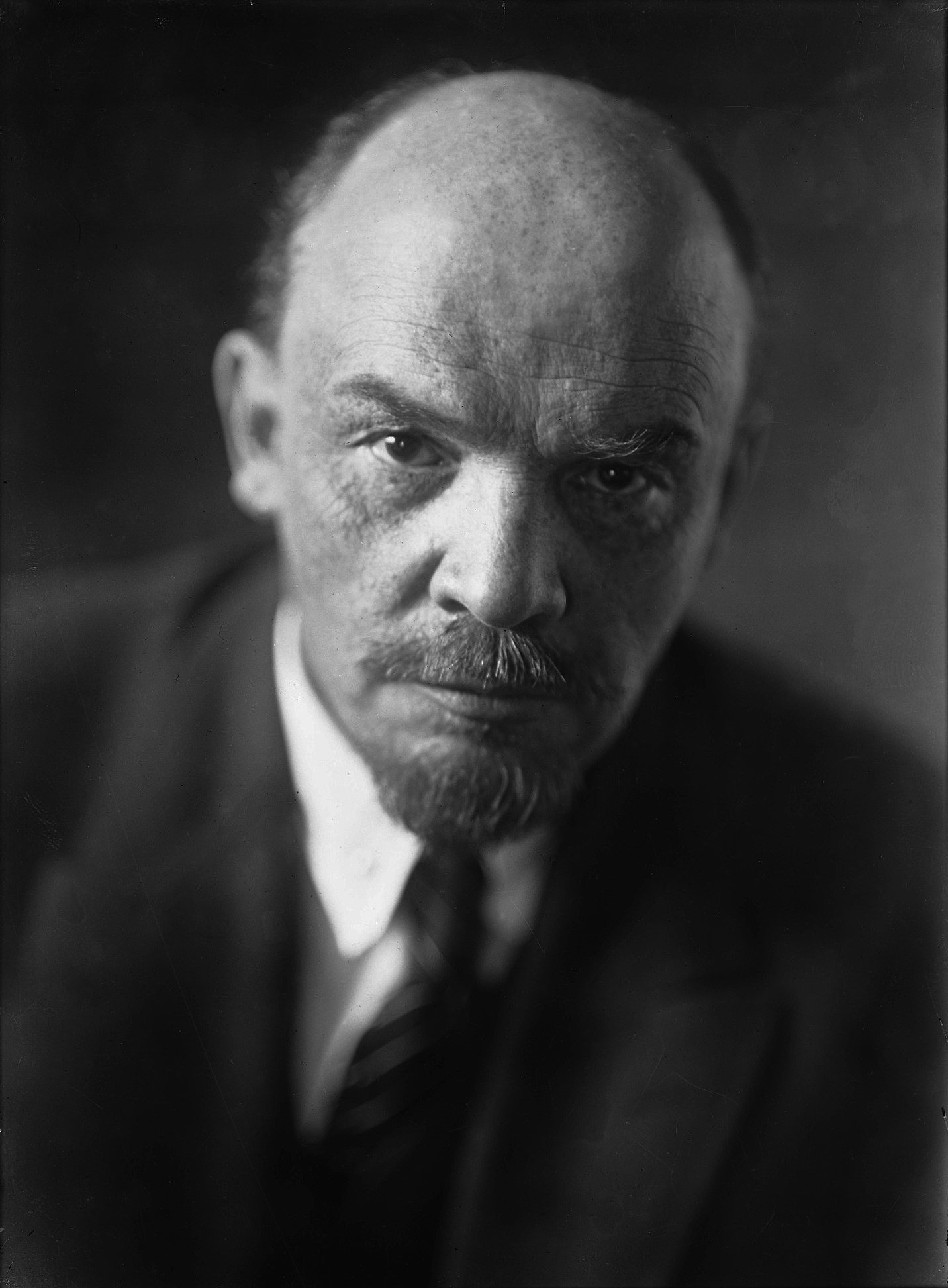
Vladimir Lenin, the first leader of Soviet Union

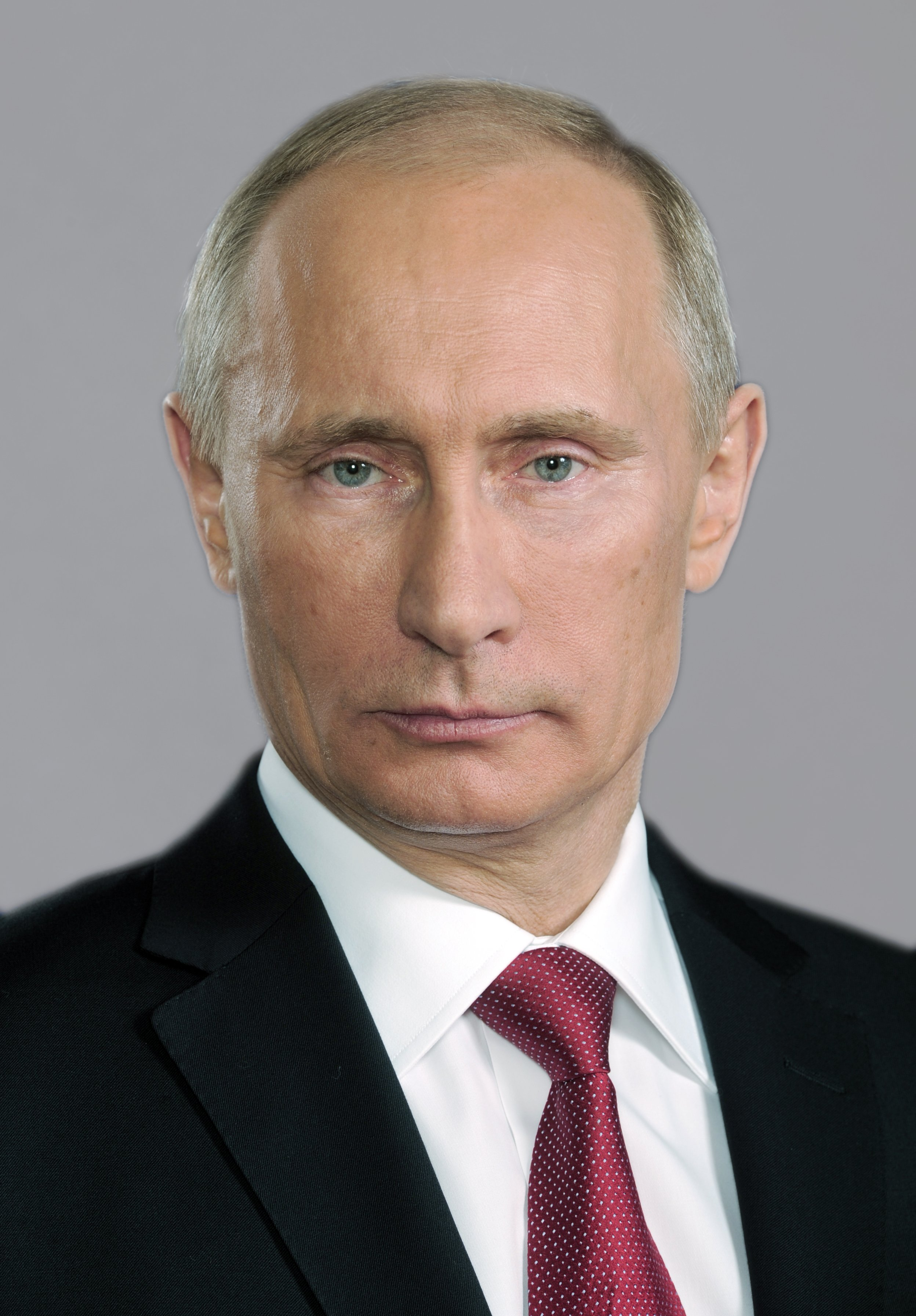
Vladimir Putin, the incumbent president and former prime minister of Russia

Saint Petersburg State University has a strong reputation in the field of politics, having educated:

- Vladimir Putin, 2nd and 4th president of Russia (2000–2008, 2012-present), 5th and 9th prime minister of Russia (1999–2000, 2008–2012)
- Dalia Grybauskaite, 8th president of Lithuania (2009–2019)
- Ion Inculeţ, 1st president of the Moldavian Democratic Republic (1917–1918)
- Levon Ter-Petrosyan, 1st president of Armenia (1991–1998)
- Gabriel Narutowicz, 1st president of Poland (1922)
- Antanas Smetona, 1st president of Lithuania (1919-1920, 1926-1940)
- Dmitry Medvedev, 3rd president of Russia (2008–2012), 10th prime minister of Russia (2012–2020)
- Vladimir Lenin, 1st leader of Soviet Russia (1917–1923) and the Soviet Union (1923–1924)
- Jazep Varonka, 1st prime minister of the Belarusian National Republic (1918)
- Augustinas Voldemaras, 1st and 12th prime minister of Lithuania (1918, 1926–1929)
- Boris Shturmer, 5th prime minister of the Russian Empire (1916)
- Pyotr Stolypin, 3rd prime minister of the Russian Empire (1906–1911)
- Alexander Kerensky, 2nd minister-chairman of the Russian Provisional Government (1917)
- Liudmyla Denisova, 3rd ombudsman in Ukraine (2018–2022)
- Ben-Zion Dinur, 4th minister of education of Israel (1951–1955)
- Jean-Claude Gakosso, 16th minister of foreign affairs of the Republic of the Congo (2015–present)
- Lyudmila Narusova, Russian Federation senator from Tuva (2016–present) and from Bryansk Oblast (2010–2012)
- Anatoly Sobchak, 1st mayor of Saint Petersburg (1991–1996) and a co-author of the Constitution of Russia

=== Nobel laureates ===
Nine graduates of the university are Nobel Prize recipients:

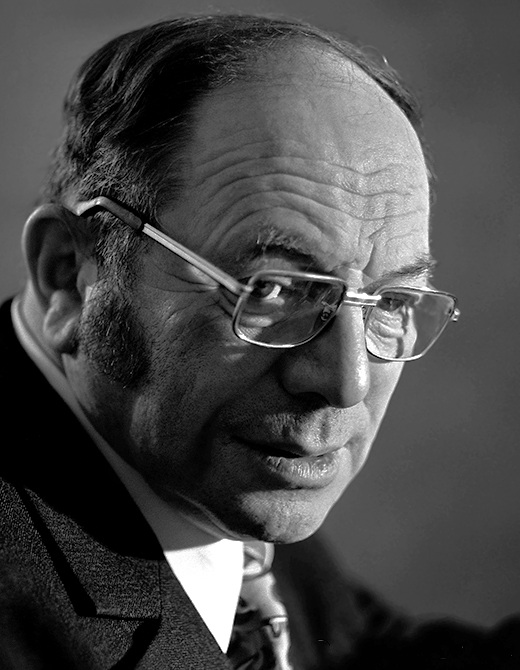
Leonid Kantorovich

- Ilya Mechnikov, Russian-French, Physiology or Medicine in 1908
- Ivan Pavlov, physiologist, psychologist, and physician; Nobel laureate in Physiology or Medicine in 1904
- Nikolay Semyonov, Chemistry in 1956
- Lev Landau, physicist; Nobel laureate in Physics in 1962
- Aleksandr Prokhorov, Australian-Soviet-Russian, Physics in 1964
- Wassily Leontief, Soviet-American economist; Nobel laureate in Economics in 1973
- Leonid Kantorovich, economist, Nobel laureate in Economics in 1975
- Joseph Brodsky, Russian-American, Literature in 1987
- Alexey Ekimov, Chemistry in 2023

=== Science and mathematics ===
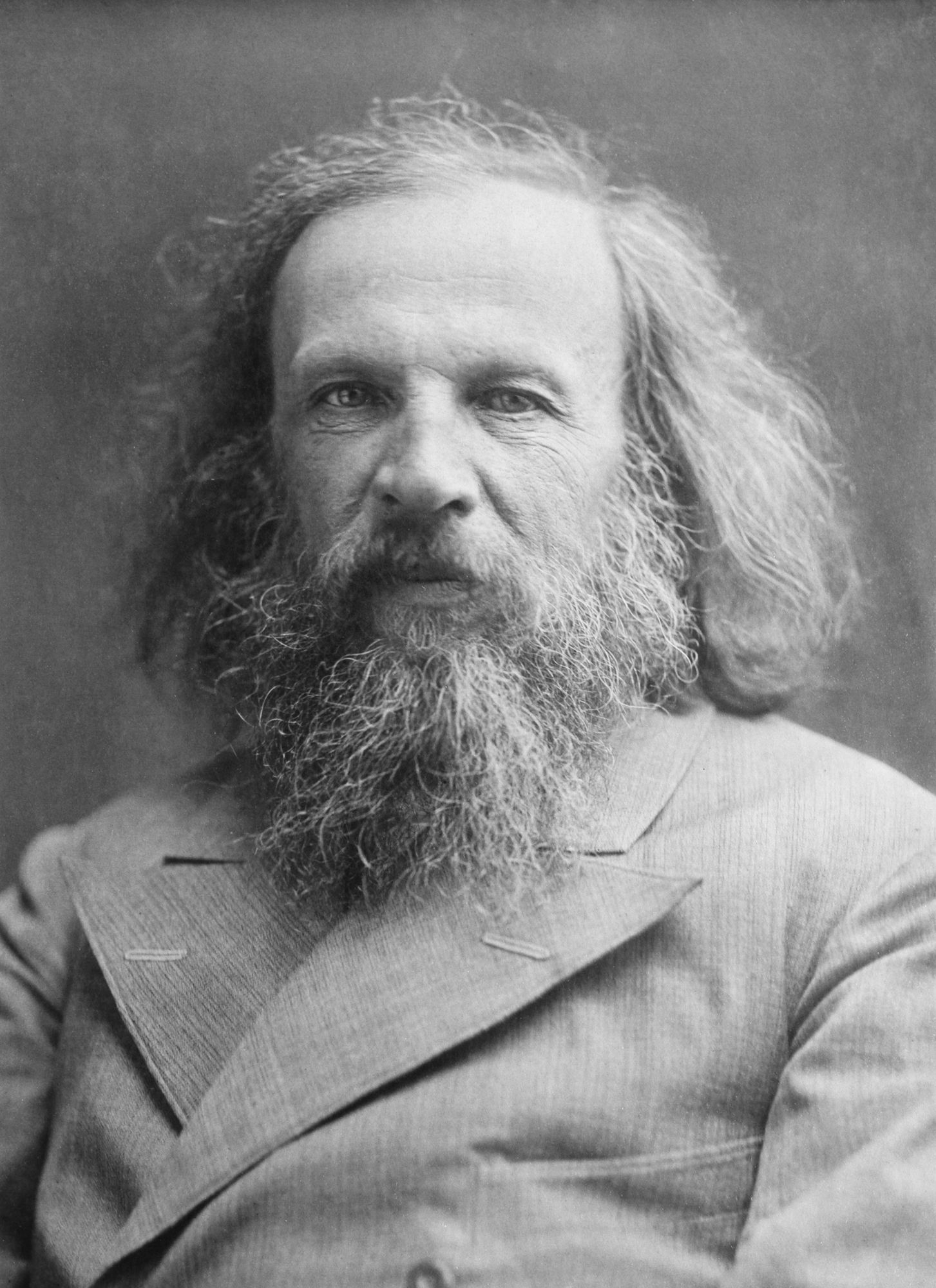
Dmitri Mendeleev

- Dmitri Mendeleev, chemist, creator of the first version of the periodic table of elements
- Alexander Barvinok, mathematician
- Raissa Berg, Russian-American geneticist and evolutionary biologist
- Abram Besicovitch, Russian-British mathematician
- Lev M. Bregman, Soviet-Israeli mathematician
- Pafnuty Chebyshev, mathematician
- Yakov Eliashberg, Russian-American mathematician
- Leonard Euler, mathematician
- Vera Faddeeva, mathematician
- Vladimir Fock, physicist
- Sergey Fomin, Russian-American mathematician
- Leonid Frankfurt, Russian-Israeli physicist
- George Gamow, Soviet-American cosmologist
- Israel Gohberg, Soviet-Israeli mathematician
- Mikhail Gromov, Franco-Russian mathematician, Abel Prize winner
- Alexander Alfonsovich Grossheim, Ukrainian botanist
- Georges Gurvitch, Russian-born French sociologist and jurist
- Viktor Ambartsumian, Soviet-Armenian theoretical astrophysist
- Solomon Herzenstein, zoologist
- Cecil Hoare FRS, British protozoologist and parasitologist
- Alexander Its, mathematician
- Ivan Ivanov, mathematician
- Dmitry Ivanovsky, biologist
- Faina Kirillova, mathematician and control theorist
- Leo Klejn, archaeologist, anthropologist, and philologist
- Wladimir Köppen, Russian-German geographer, meteorologist, climatologist and botanist
- Yuri Linnik, mathematician
- Mikhail Lomonosov, scientist, author and polymath
- Victor L'vov, physicist
- Aleksandr Lyapunov, mathematician, mechanician and physicist
- Victor Lyatkher, renewable energy engineer
- Andrey Markov, mathematician
- Boris Nikolsky, chemist
- Konstantin Petrzhak, physicist
- Lev Rapoport, theoretical physicist
- Alexander Raikhel, Soviet-American entomologist
- Natasha Raikhel, Soviet-American plant cell biologist
- Vladimir Rokhlin, mathematician
- Nikolai Semenov, physicist and chemist
- Stanislav Smirnov, mathematician, Fields Medal winner (2010)
- Jacob Tamarkin, Russian-American mathematician
- Vladimir Vernadsky, mineralogist and geochemist
- Georgy Voronoy, mathematician
- Emil Wiesel, Russian-German artist, museum curator, full member of the Imperial Academy of Arts (since 1914), organizer of international art exhibitions, councilor of Hermitage Museum and Russian Museum
- Sergei Winogradsky, microbiologist, ecologist and soil scientist
- Yuri Yappa, theoretical physicist
- Victor Zalgaller, Russian-Israeli mathematician

=== Literature and the arts ===
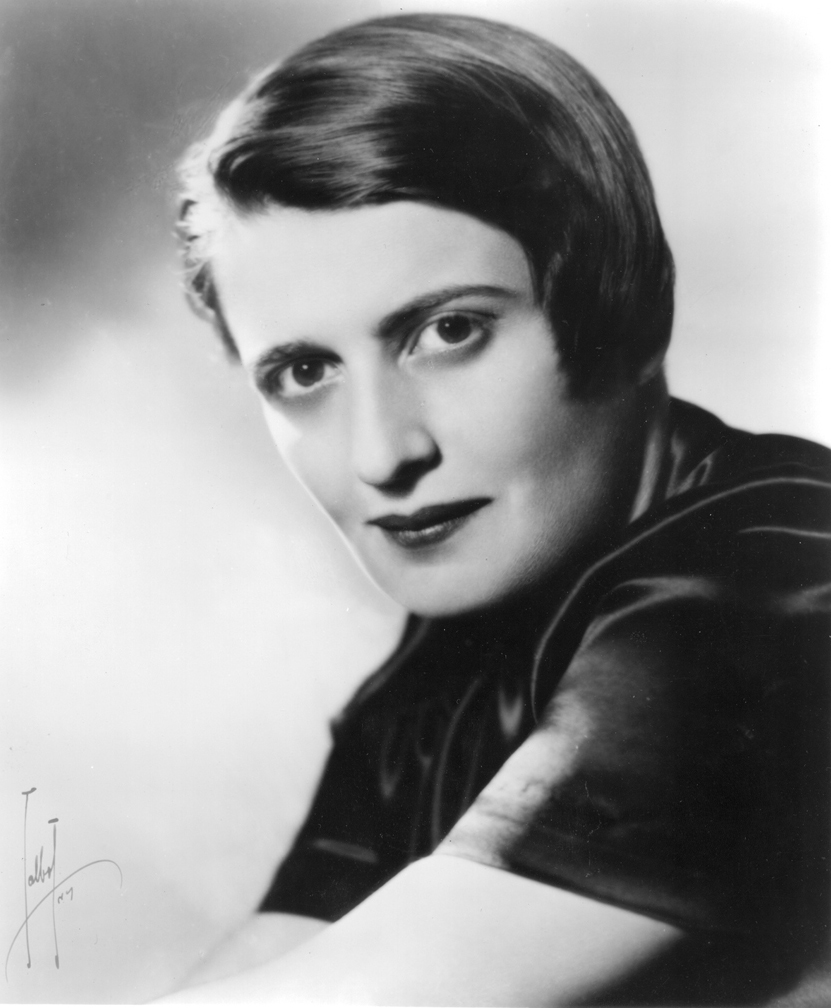
Ayn Rand

- Johann Admoni, composer, pianist, teacher, and public person
- Alexander Blok, poet
- Ilia Chavchavadze, Georgian writer, politician and public benefactor
- Igor Chubais, philosopher, sociologist, and author
- Solomon Dodashvili, Georgian philosopher, grammarian, belletrist
- Ayn Rand, Russian-born American novelist
- Boris Grebenshchikov, founder and lead singer of the band Aquarium
- Yehuda L. Katzenelson, writer and doctor
- Alexander Kugel, theatre critic and editor
- Julian Henry Lowenfeld, American-Russian poet, playwright, trial lawyer, Composer, and translator
- Salomon Mandelkern, poet and author
- Olga Ozarovskaya, folklorist, storyteller, performer, writer, and an archivist of fairy tales
- Mahapandit Rahul Sankrityayan, Indian historian
- Nicholas Roerich, artist
- Lyubov Speranskaya, theater artist
- Maximilian Steinberg, composer of classical music
- Igor Stravinsky, composer
- Ivan Turgenev, writer

Other notable alumni include: Alexander Alekhine, fourth World Chess Champion and Grigory Levenfish, 2x Soviet chess champion, Gennadiy Shatkov, Olympic champion in boxing, and Eduard Vinokurov, Olympic and world champion sabre fencer. Joseph Shor, a student of the School of Mathematics and Mechanics, known as the main protege of Ostap Bender. Igor Artimovich, known for creating Festi. Yakov Rekhter, known for creating BGP. Nikolai Kondratiev, Soviet economist, known for the business cycle theory known as Kondratiev waves.

Pavel Durov, the Telegram founder, graduated from the department of philology while his brother, Nikolai Durov received his PhD from the department of mathematics. Kyrgyz sociologist Rakhat Achylova received her DPhil in 1988.

== Rectors ==
1819–1821 Mikhail Balugyansky
1821–1825 Yevdokim Zyablovskiy (acting)
1825–1836 Antoine Jeudy Dugour
1836–1840 Ivan Shulgin
1840–1861 Pyotr Pletnyov
1861 Izmail Sreznevsky (acting)
1861–1863 Aleksandr Voskresensky (acting)
1863–1865 Heinrich Lenz
1865–1867 Aleksandr Voskresensky
1867–1873 Karl Kessler
1873–1876 Pyotr Redkin
1876–1883 Andrey Beketov
1883 (1884)–1887 Ivan Andreevsky
1887–1890 Mikhail Vladislavlev
1890 Ivan Pomyalovsky (acting)
1890–1897 Pyotr Nikitin
1897–1899 Vasily Sergeevich
1899–1903 Adolf Holmsten
1903–1905 Aleksandr Zhdanov
1905–1910 Ivan Borgman
1910–1911 David Grimm
1911–1918 Erwin Grimm
1918–1919 Alexander Ivanov
1919 Sergei Zhebelev (acting)
1919–1922 Vladimir Shimkevich
1922–1926 Nikolay Derzhavin
1926–1927 Vsevolod Tomashevsky
1927–1930 Mikhail Serebryakov
1930–1932 Yury Nikich-Krilichevsky (director)
1932–1933 Viktor Seryozhnikov (director)
1933–1937 Mikhail Lazurkin (director)
1937-1938 Boris Berezin (acting)
1938–1939 Konstantin Lukashev (director)
1939 Artemy Marchenko (acting)
1939–1941 Pyotr Zolotukhin (director)
1941–1948 Alexander Voznesensky
1948–1950 Nikita Domnin
1950 Mikhail Artamonov (acting)
1950–1952 Alexey Ilyushin
1952–1964 Aleksandr Aleksandrov
1964–1970 Kirill Kondratyev
1970–1975 Gleb Makarov
1975–1986 Valentin Aleskovsky
1986–1993 Stanislav Merkuriev
1993(1994)–2008 Lyudmila Verbitskaya
since 2008 Nikolay Kropachev

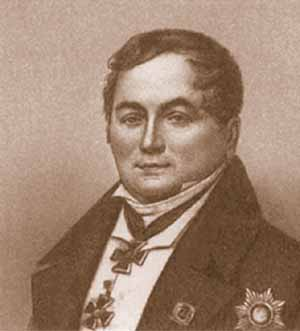
Mikhail Balugyansky

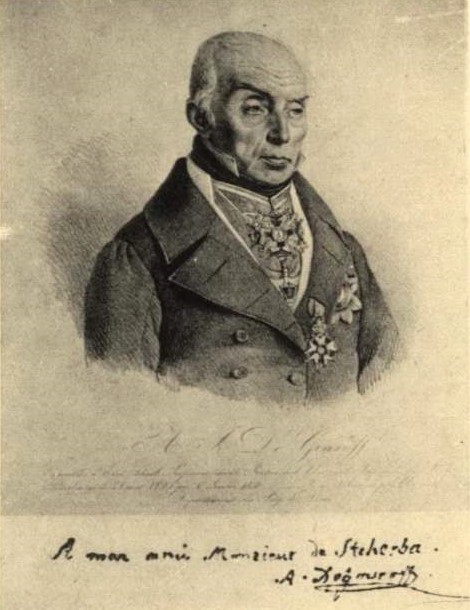
Antoine Jeudy Dugour

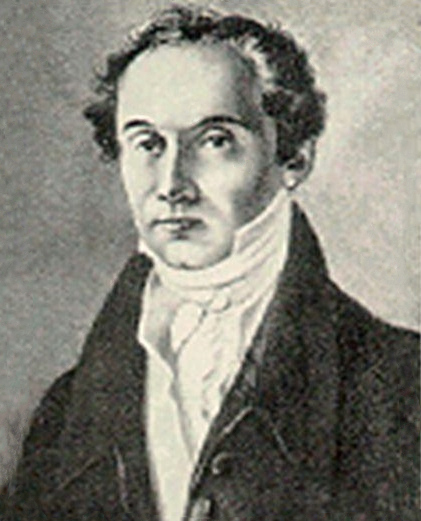
Ivan Shulgin

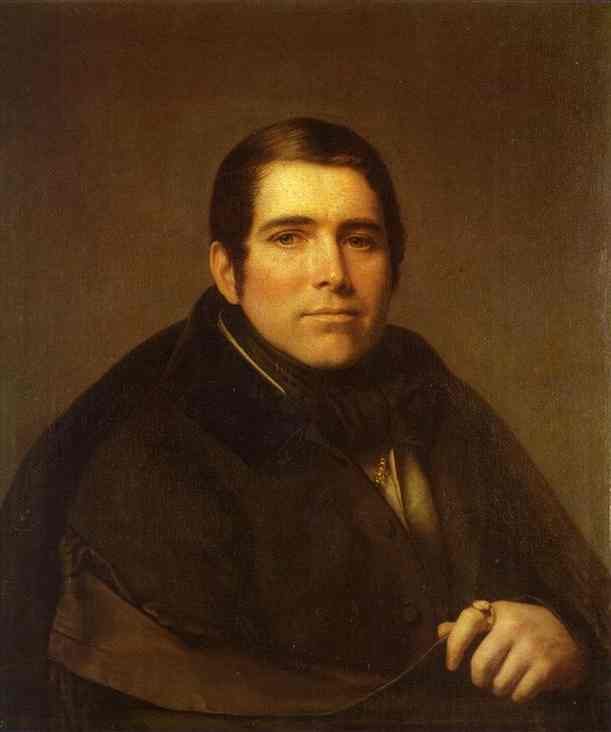
Pyotr Pletnyov

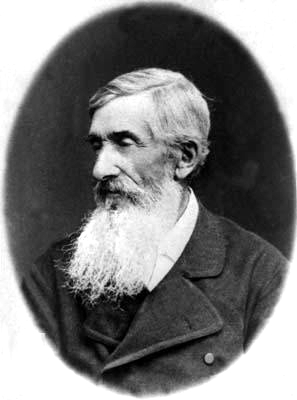
Izmail Sreznevsky

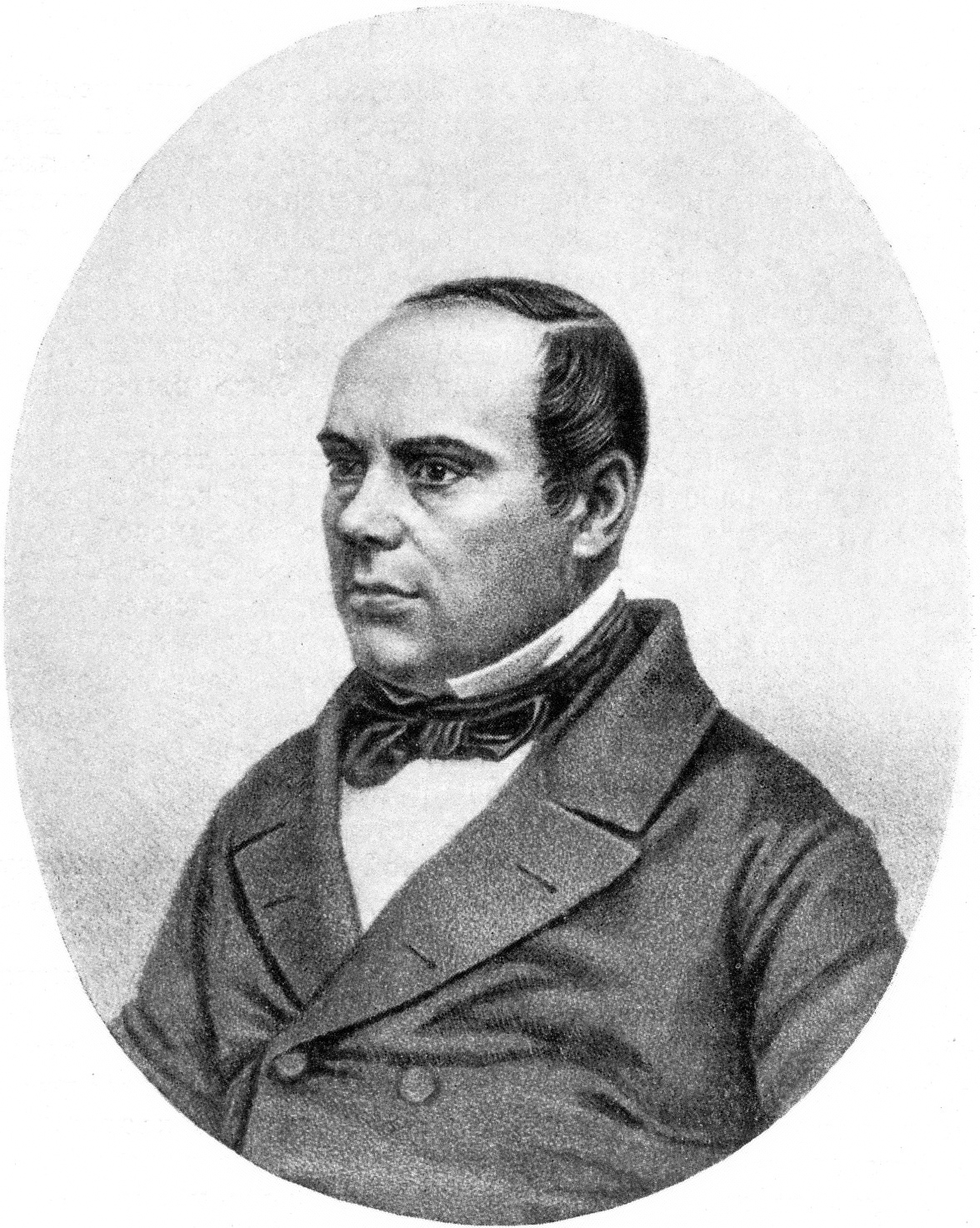
Aleksandr Voskresensky

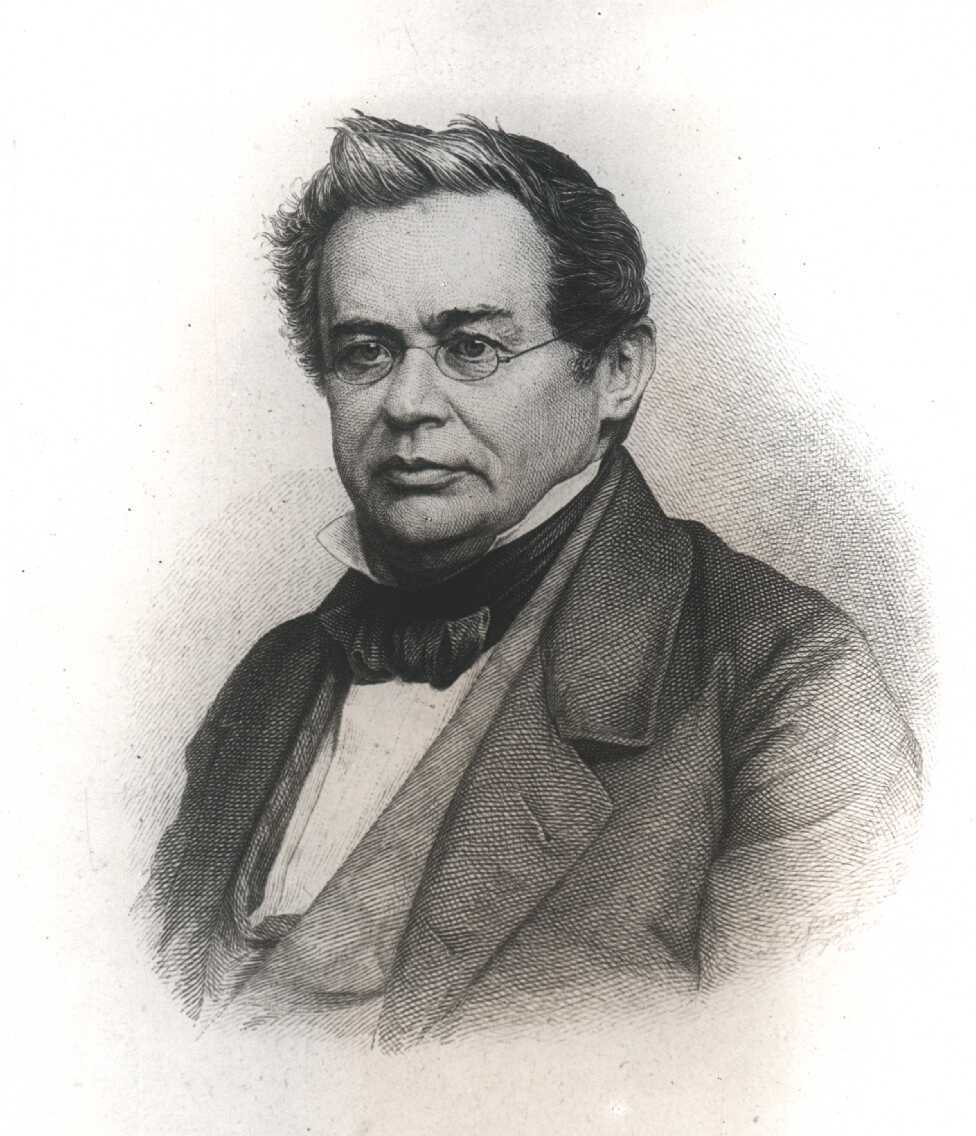
Heinrich Lenz

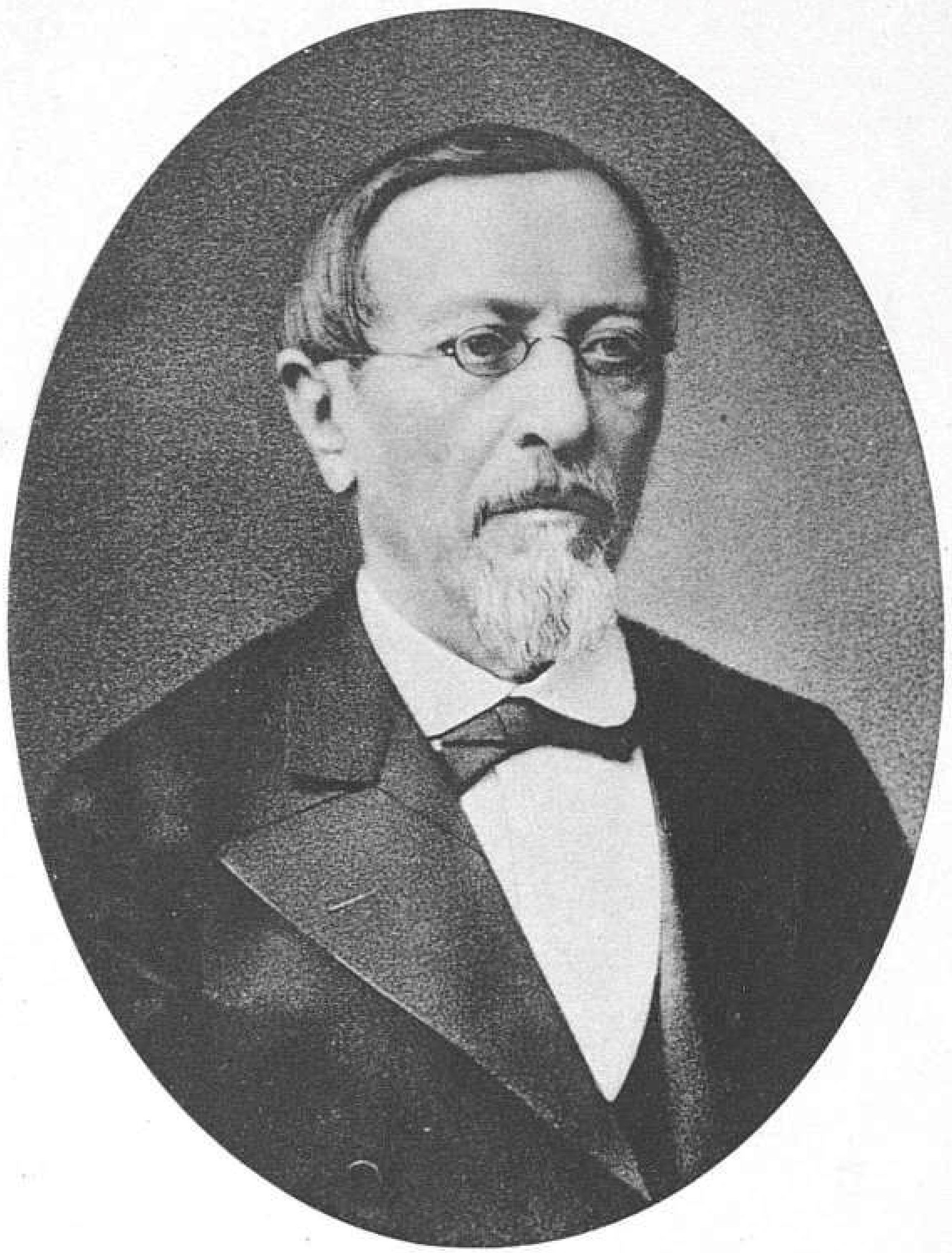
Karl Kessler

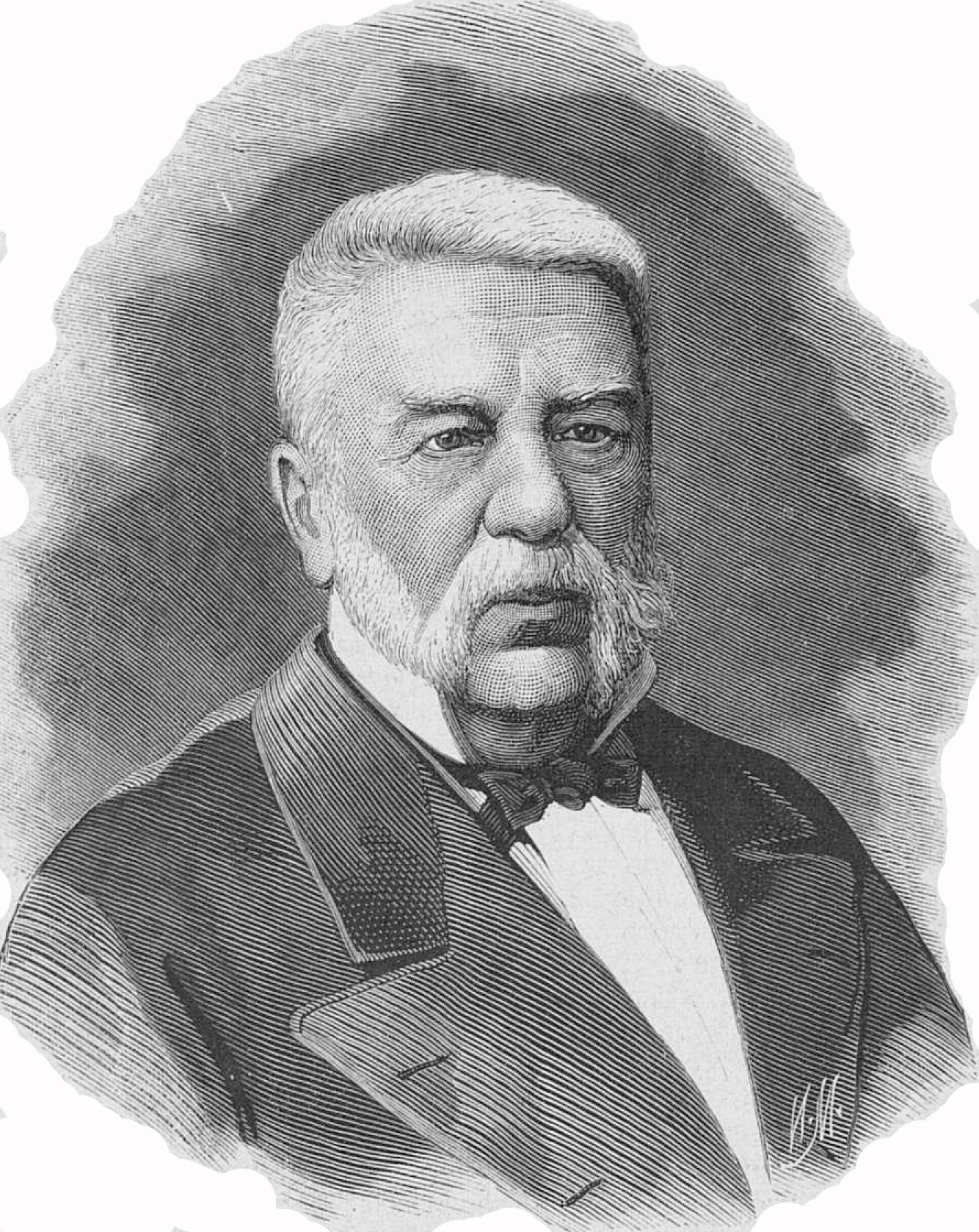
Pyotr Redkin

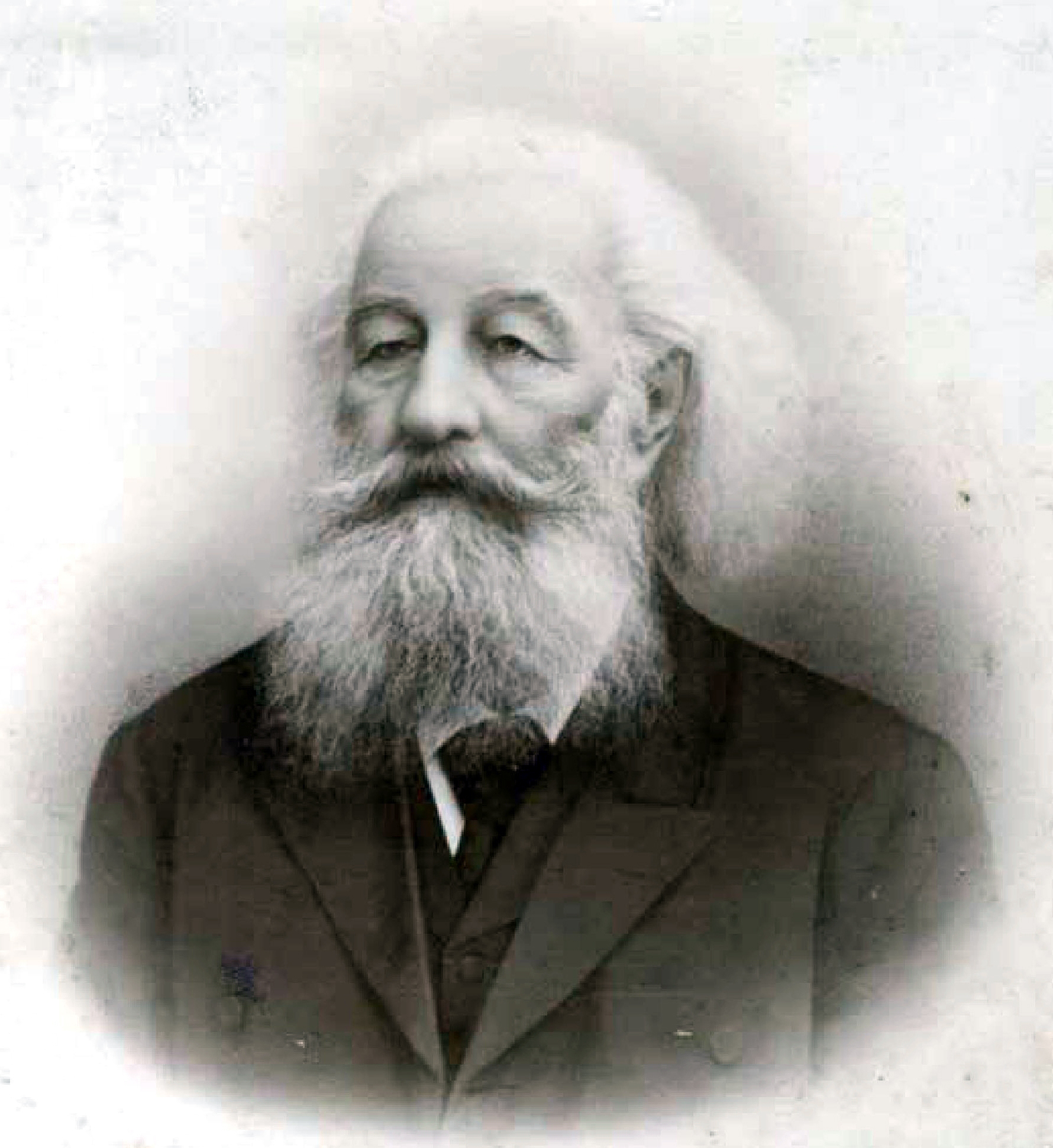
Andrey Beketov

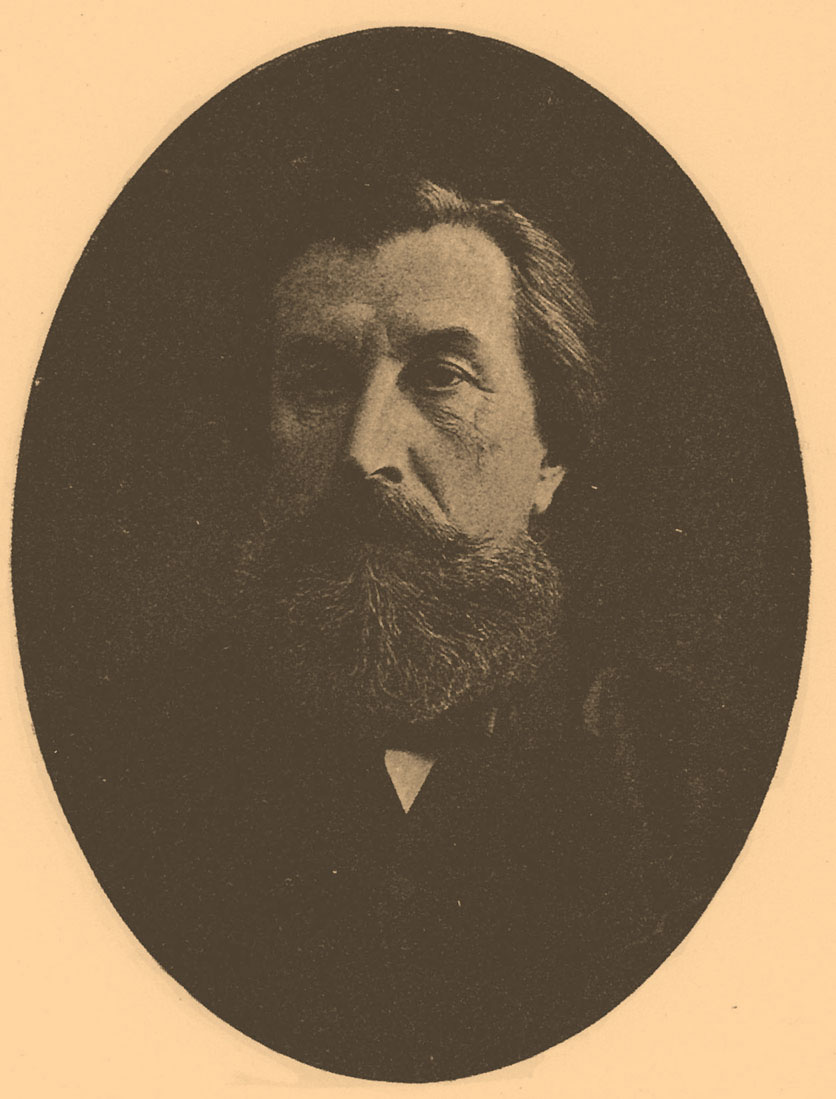
Ivan Andreevsky

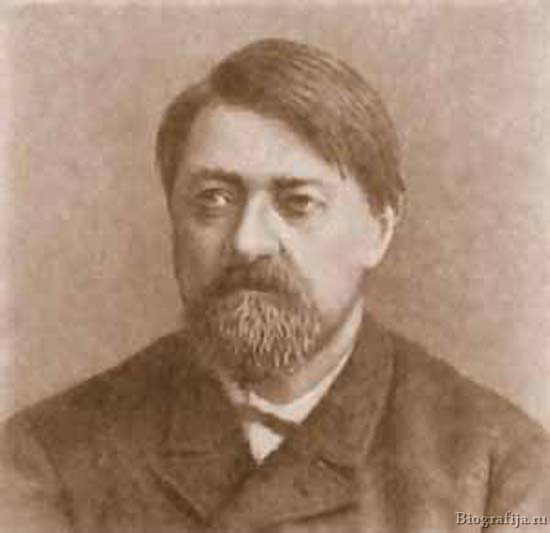
Mikhail Vladislavlev

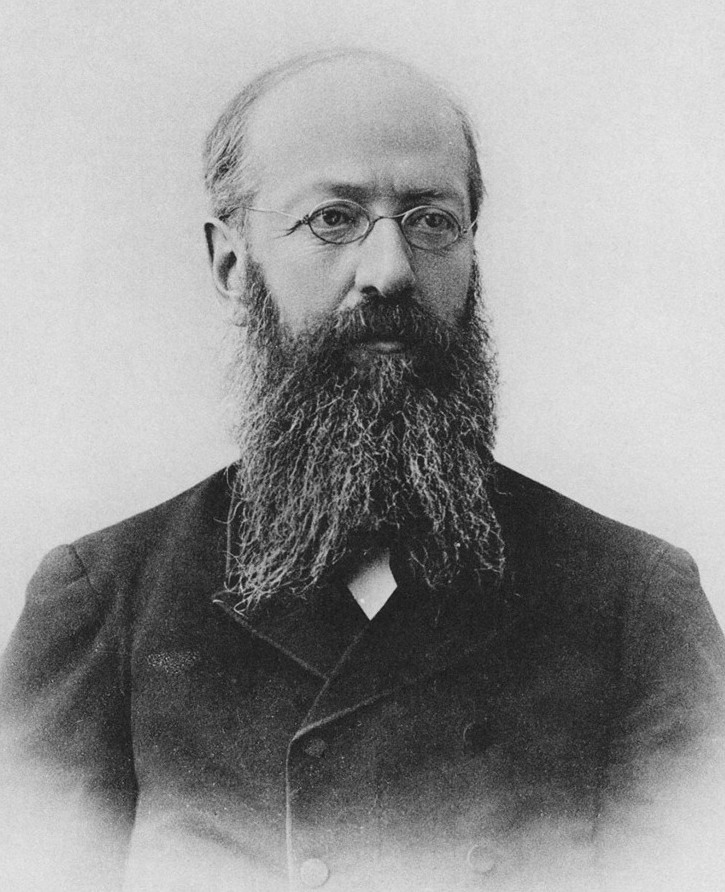
Ivan Pomyalovsky

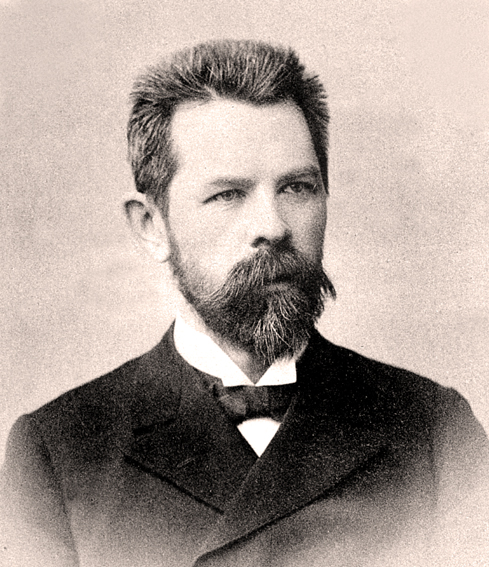
Pyotr Nikitin

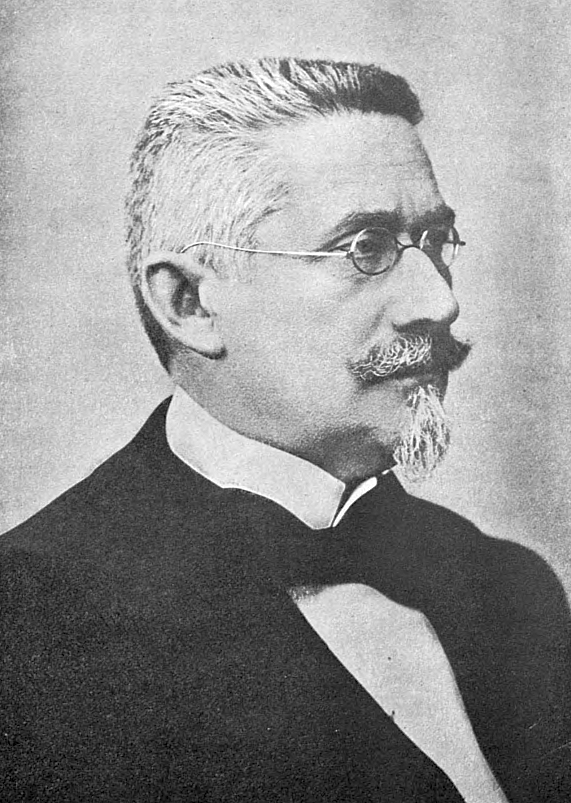
Vasily Sergeevich

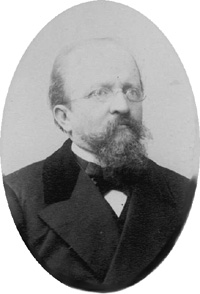
Adolf Holmsten

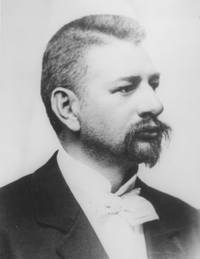
Aleksandr Zhdanov

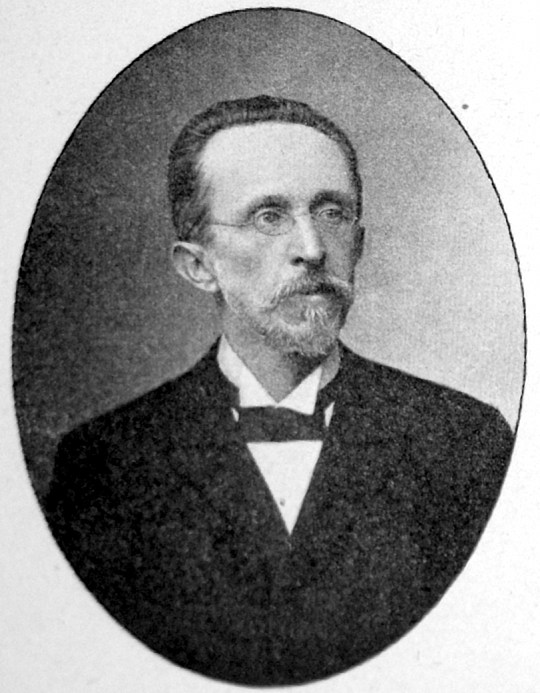
Ivan Borgman

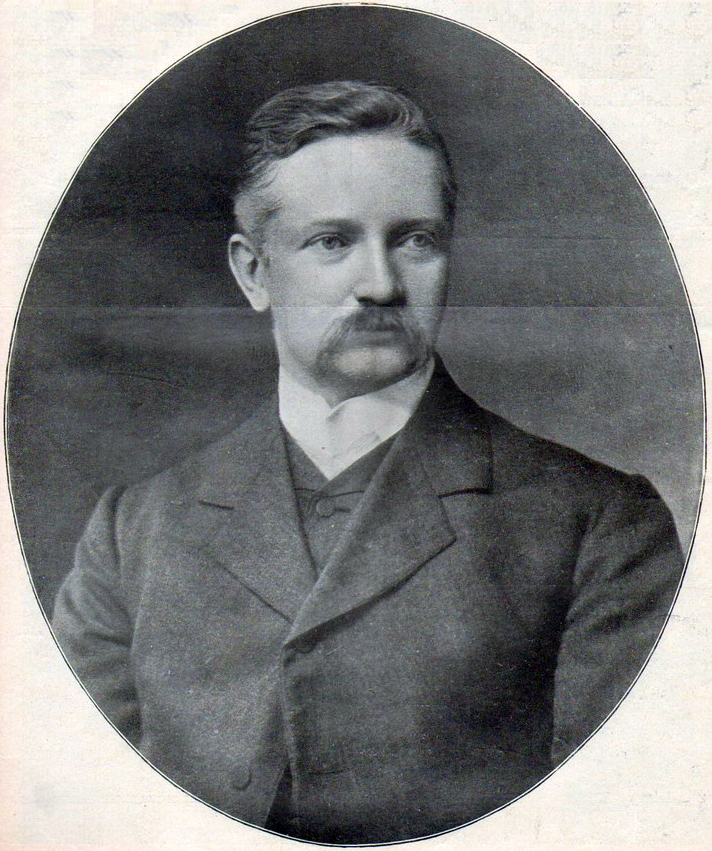
David Grimm

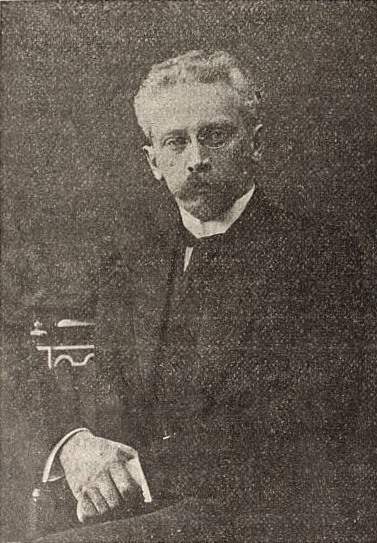
Erwin Grimm

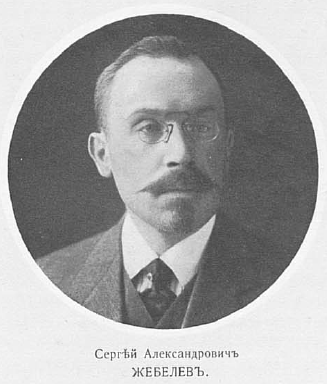
Sergei Zhebelev

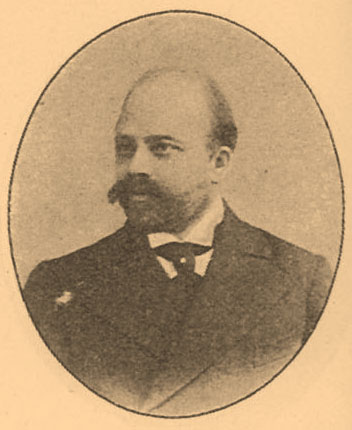
Vladimir Shimkevich

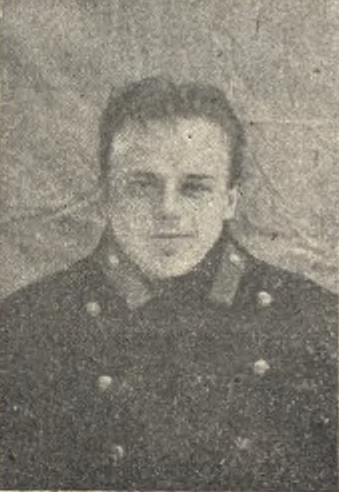
Mikhail Serebryakov

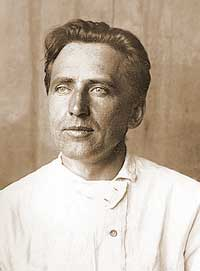
Mikhail Artamonov

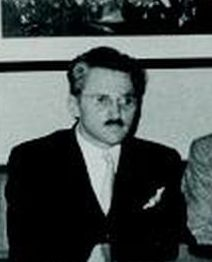
Aleksandr Aleksandrov

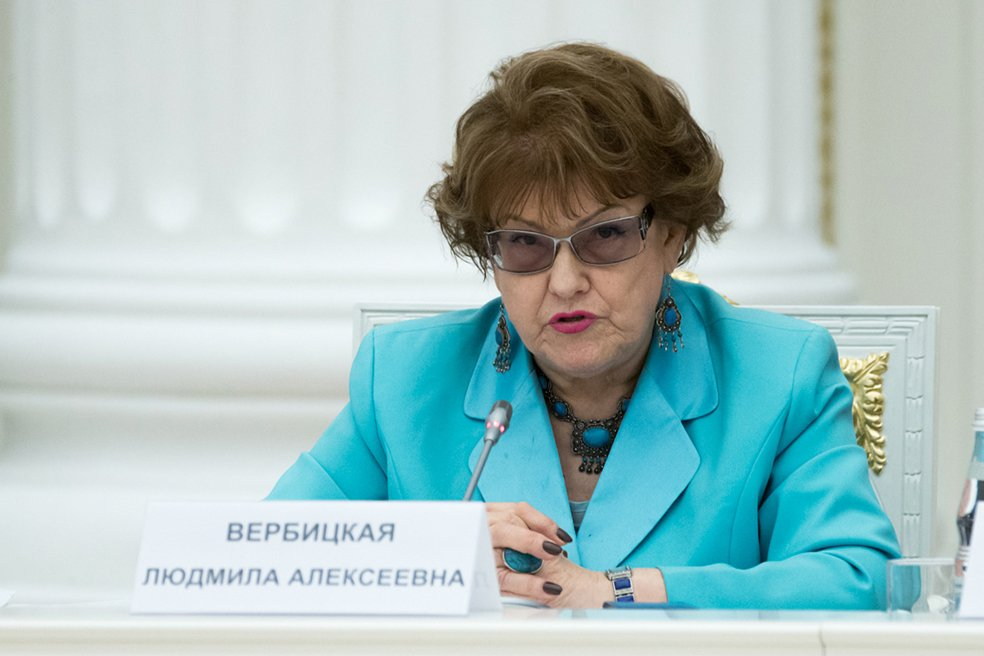
Lyudmila Verbitskaya

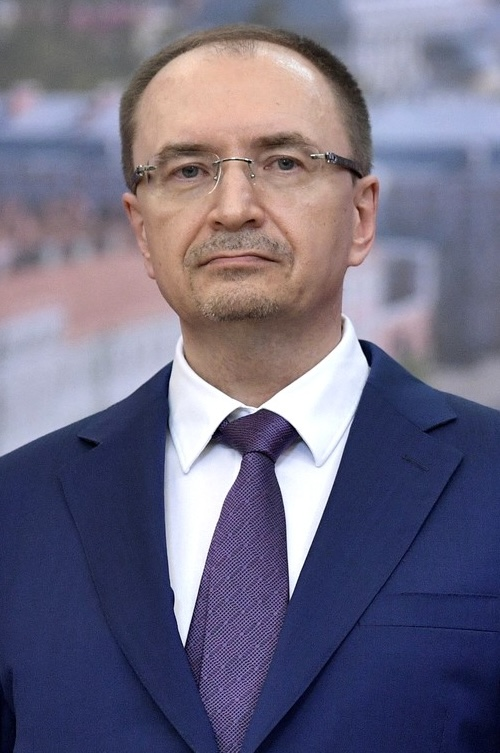
Nikolay Kropachev

== See also ==
- Education in Russia
- List of universities in Russia
- Open access in Russia
- Smolny College
- List of early modern universities in Europe

== Bibliography ==
- Lempert, David (1996). Daily Life in a Crumbling Empire: The Absorption of Russia into the World Economy. Eastern European Monograph Series. Vol. 2. Columbia University Press. ISBN 978-0-88033-341-2. — The history of the university, with a particular focus on the law faculty, from the 19th century to the perestroika period.
