= David Grimm =

David Grimm may refer to:

- David Grimm (writer) (born 1965), American playwright and screenwriter
- David Grimm (architect) (1823–1898), Russian architect
- David Grimm (lawyer) (1864–1941), Russian and Estonian lawyer, politician
- David Grimm (entrepreneur) (born 1990), American entrepreneur
