= Yuri Krutkov =

Russian physicist and university teacher (1890–1952)

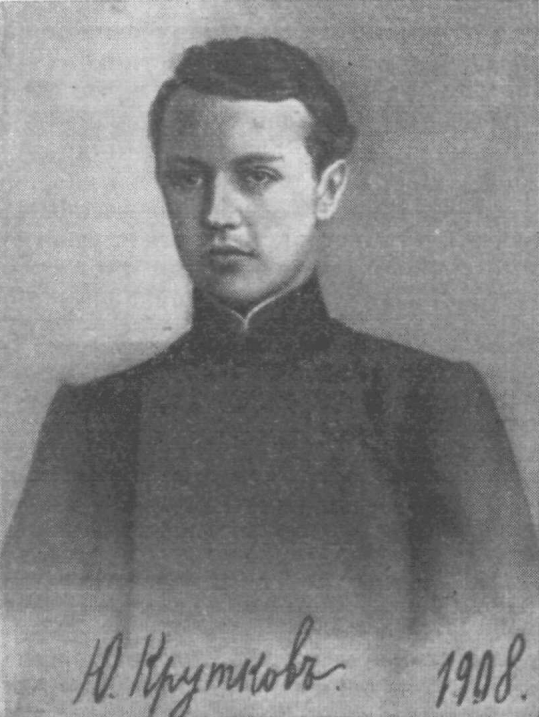
Krutkov in 1908

Yuri Alexandrovich Krutkov (Russian: Юрий Александрович Крутков, 29 May 1890 – 12 September 1952) was a Russian and among the first Soviet theoretical physicists. Krutkov worked on cosmology. He was a professor of physics at the University of St. Petersburg from 1921-1952.

== Life and work ==
Krutkov was born in St. Petersburg where his father Alexander taught Greek, Latin and Russian. The family moved to Lubny for sometime. Krutkov graduated from the St. Petersburg gymnasium in 1908 and went to study physics at the University where he studied under Paul Ehrenfest. He was among the first physicists who were purely theoretical. When Ehrenfest moved to Leiden University, he too did the same.

His first work was on adiabatic invariants. Funded by a Rockefeller Foundation grant, he worked in Germany and Holland in 1922-23 during which time he met Albert Einstein. Here he pointed out an error in Einstein's critique of Alexander Friedmann's work on the expanding universe. Krutkov later considered rotational Brownian motion and looked at the theory of rolling motion of ships floating on a randomly moving sea and examined the physical predictions. He applied statistical mechanics to gyroscopes and wrote a book on the general theory of gyroscopes in collaboration with Alexei Krylov.

Krutkov taught at the Leningrad Polytechnic Institute and at the Leningrad University where his students included Vladimir A. Fock. During World War II he was imprisoned but continued to work on some aerodynamics problems with Andrei Tupolev.
