= Ivan Borgman =

Ivan Ivanovich Borgman
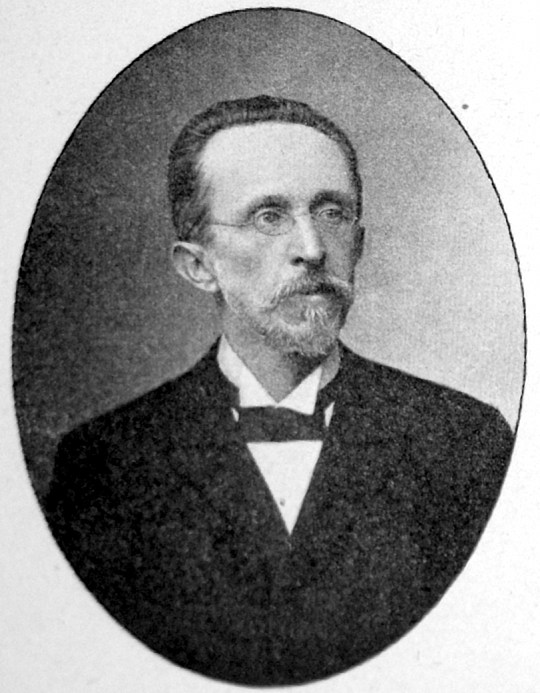
- Born: 24 February 1849
- Died: 17 May 1914 (aged 65)
- Scientific career
- Fields: Physics
- Workplaces: Saint Petersburg State University

Ivan Ivanovich Borgman (24 February 1849 – 17 May 1914) was a physicist from the Russian Empire, who first demonstrated in 1897 that X-rays and radioactive materials induced thermoluminescence.

== Biography ==
Borgman was born to a Russified Finnish-born father and a Russian mother. After graduating from the Second Saint Petersburg Gymnasium, he entered the Physics and Mathematics department of Saint Petersburg State University, in 1866 and graduated in 1870. In 1873, Borgman went to the University of Heidelberg, where he attended lectures and studied in the laboratory under the German physicist Gustav Kirchhoff. In 1875, he was appointed as a laboratory assistant at St. Petersburg University. Borgman received his Doctorate in 1882 after defending his thesis "On Slight heating of iron in the magnetization."

He became a professor of physics in Saint Petersburg State University from 1888. There he taught the famous physicist Alexander Popov. He along with Orest Khvolson taught one of the earliest course of electrical engineering in Russia. In 1897, Borgman became the first scientist to demonstrate that X-rays and radioactive materials induce thermoluminescence. He was also the first elected rector of the Saint Petersburg State University in 1905. He left the post in 1910.

Under the leadership of Borgman, the V. A. Fock Institute of Physics was created in 1901. He was the second director of the institute from March 1902 to 1914 after F. F. Petrushevsky.

== Awards ==
In 1899, the Saint Petersburg State Electrotechnical University awarded Borgman the title of Honorary electrical engineer. In 1913 he was awarded honorary degree of Doctor of Laws (LLD) by University of St Andrews in Scotland.
