= Pyotr Pletnyov =

Russian poet and literary critic

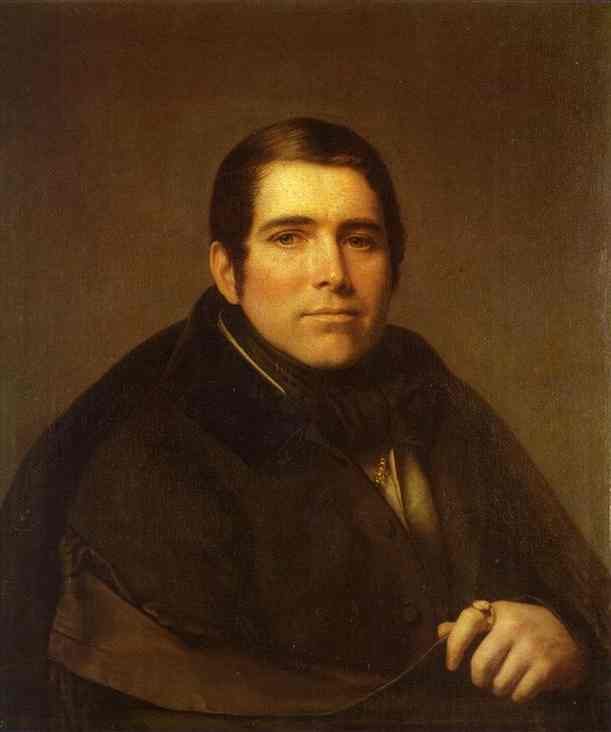
Portrait by Alexey Tyranov, 1836

Pyotr Alexandrovich Pletnyov (Russian: Пётр Александрович Плетнёв; 21 August [O.S. 10 August] 1792, in Tebleshi, Tver Governorate – 10 January 1866 [O.S. 29 December 1865]) was a minor Russian poet and literary critic, who rose to become the dean of the Saint Petersburg University (1840–61) and academician of the Petersburg Academy of Sciences (1841).

Pletnyov befriended the poet Alexander Pushkin, who dedicated his novel in verse Eugene Onegin to him. After Pushkin's death in 1837, Pletnyov edited his literary journal Sovremennik until the latter was sold to Nikolai Nekrasov in 1846. As a critic, he was strongly opposed to Vissarion Belinsky and like-minded journalists who placed "progressive ideas" above the artistic mastership.

With Sergey Uvarov's support, Pletnyov gained many teaching assignments, in and around Saint Petersburg, including in the end a tutor's post to the future Alexander II. His non-partisan view of various literary movements helped him to single out and applaud all of the most gifted writers of the day, from Vasily Zhukovsky through Nikolai Gogol to Fyodor Dostoevsky.
