= Igor Artimovich =

Russian hacker, programmer (born 1982)

- Born: 24 March 1982 (age 44); Kaliningrad Oblast, USSR
- Occupations: programmer, hacker
- Website: www.artimovich.info

Igor Alexandrovich Artimovich (born March 24, 1982, Kaliningrad Oblast, the USSR, Russian: Игорь Александрович Артимович) is a Russian programmer, hacker, and author of a botnet named Festi. He is known under the pseudonym Engel, such writing of the nickname has an origin from the name of a song of the German rock-group Rammstein.

== Early years ==
Artimovich was born in Kaliningrad Oblast, the USSR. At the age of 6 months he moved with his parents to Leningrad Oblast, where he lived until the ending of high school. His first experiences in programming were connected to the Basic language on the ZX Spectrum computer.

== Saint-Petersburg State University ==
In 1999, Artimovich entered the Saint-Petersburg State University at the faculty of Applied Mathematics, and moved to live to Saint-Petersburg. In 2004, he finished studying, having defended the thesis and having gained the diploma as "Mathematician".

== Sun Microsystems ==
From 2004, he worked in the Saint-Petersburg branch of Sun Microsystems, in the development of the C compiler which belonged to a set of development tools of the software named Sun Studio. Artimovich's duties consisted in porting the compiler of language C on the amd64 platform and realizing of functionality of the compiler specific to the operating system Linux. In 2008, Artimovich left Sun Microsystems.

Artimovich, in an interview with The New York Times, told that after leaving Sun Microsystems he was engaged in research in the field of information security and computer viruses, and also the development of his own antivirus software for Windows operating systems.

== Cyberattack on Aeroflot ==
In summer of 2010, a cyberattack similar to a "distributed denial of service" was carried out on the electronic ticket payment system of Aeroflot airline. The attack was so strong that the equipment of the backbone provider of the Internet serving payment system couldn't cope with it, and Aeroflot suspended the online sale of tickets for a week.

In autumn of 2010, specialists from the anti-virus company ESET conducted research to determine the source of the attack and drew the conclusion that the attack was made with use of the botnet Festi. This cyberattack drew the close attention of Russian intelligence services, and the conclusion was drawn that the founder and the owner of Festi was Artimovich. This was confirmed by American journalist and blogger Brian Krebs, who specializes on information security, in an article titled "Who Is the ‘Festi’ Botmaster?", as well as American journalist Andrew Kramer of The New York Times in the article titled "Online Attack Leads to Peek Into Spam Den" and also by the report by ESET antivirus company at the conference "AVAR 2012" in Hangzhou, China, dedicated to Anti-virus Technologies and Corporate Security.
