= Second Saint Petersburg Gymnasium =

The Second Saint Petersburg Gymnasium
- Вторая Санкт-Петербургская гимназия
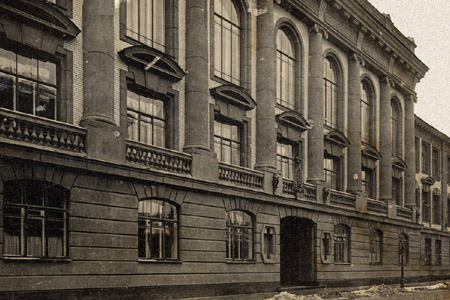

Location
- Kazanskaya street, 27; Saint Petersburg; Russia
- Coordinates: 59.9301°N 30.3151°E

Information
- Type: Gymnasium
- Established: September 7, 1805; 220 years ago
- Principal: Ludmila Maratovna Marder
- Grades: 1-11
- Enrollment: 1359
- Colors: Blue, white, gold
- Website: www.2spbg.ru

The Second Saint Petersburg Gymnasium is one of the oldest schools in Saint Petersburg, Russia. It was founded in 1805 by Emperor Alexander I. The Gymnasium is located in the Admiralteysky District of Saint Petersburg.

Many of the students are participants of all kinds of the city, national and international Olympiads, contests, conferences and competitions.

The gymnasium is usually involved in international projects such as the MUN project with its annual international conferences, the Russian-Finnish project “ICT-based Education as a Driver of Change in Learning”, the International Science Olympiad and others; cultural exchange programmes, international festivals and competitions.

== Academics ==
Apart from Russia's basic curriculum, the Second Gymnasium provides an opportunity of extensive English and a second language (either German, Spanish, Chinese or French) learning.

== History ==
The Gymnasium opened its doors on 7 September 1805 (it was named St. Petersburg Provincial Gymnasium back then). 96 pupils were admitted to the school on the opening day, but soon the number of students reached 400. Initially intended as a boarding school for boys of noble families, the Gymnasium, nevertheless, provided full-tuition financial aid for talented but poor children if they were able to pass the entrance exams successfully. Many notable university professors were invited to teach at the gymnasium, and its diplomas were considered on par with those of universities for public service employment.

After 1917 the gymnasium became a co-ed school, and its focus steadily shifted to providing general education with a practical emphasis. The name was changed from Petrograd Second Gymnasium to the 1st Unified Labor School of the Kazansky district; after that, the school was repeatedly renamed during the Soviet rule. In 1962 it was able to get a new status – profound study of English was introduced into curriculum, and that enabled the school's authorities to establish contacts with some schools abroad and start several exchanges programmes. In 1990 the school regained the status of gymnasium and reverted to its historical name.

== Notable alumni ==
- Nicholas Miklouho-Maclay (1846–1888), an ethnologist and explorer
- Alexander Gorchakov (1798–1883), a diplomat and statesman
- Alexander Friedmann (1888–1925), a physicist and mathematician
- Alexandre Benois (1870–1960), an artist and historian
- Eugene Botkin (1865–1918), a physician
- Ivan Borgman (1849–1914), a physicist
- Igor Stravinsky, composer, pianist, and conductor
- Yuri Krutkov (1890–1952), physicist
