= Aleksandr Voskresensky =

Russian chemist (1808–1880)

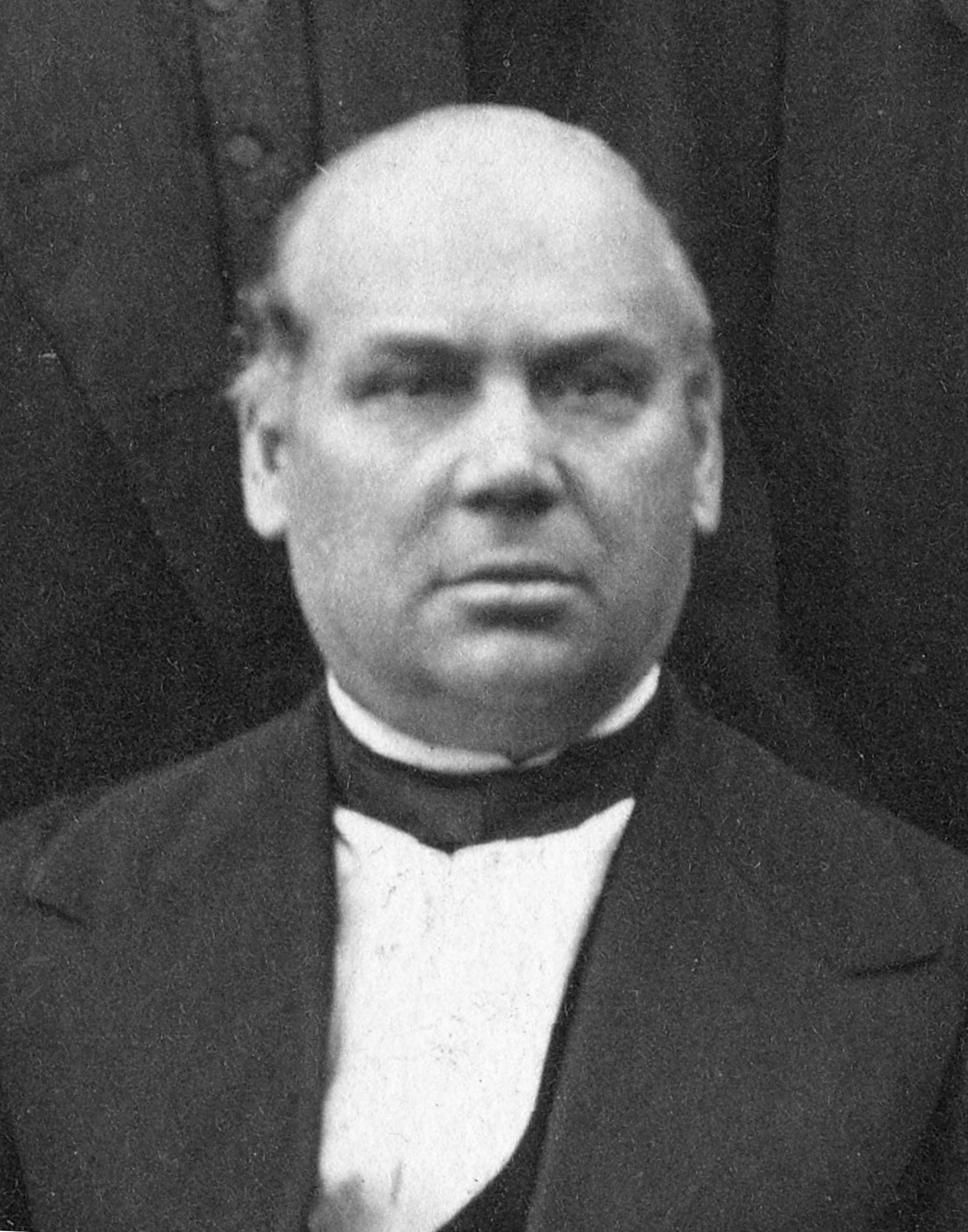
- Born: 25 November 1808; Torzhok, Russian Empire
- Died: 21 January 1880 (aged 71); Saint Petersburg, Russian Empire
- Known for: Discovery of theobromine
- Scientific career
- Fields: Chemistry
- Workplaces: University of St. Petersburg
- Doctoral advisor: Germain Henri Hess

Aleksandr Abramovich Voskresensky (Russian: Александр Абрамович Воскресенский; 25 November 1808 – 21 January 1880) was a Russian chemist who served as rector of Saint Petersburg Imperial University in 1861–1863 and 1865–1867. Dmitri Mendeleev regarded him as a "grandfather of Russian chemistry". One of his major scientific achievements is the discovery of theobromine, the major alkaloid of cacao beans.

== Biography ==
Voskresensky was born to a family of a poor priest, who died in 1814. He had one sister and one brother. From early ages he showed talents for sciences, and, after graduating from the St. Petersburg Institute of Pedagogy in 1836, was sent to Germany to continue his education. There he attended courses of Eilhard Mitscherlich, Heinrich Rose and Justus von Liebig, who considered Voskresensky one his most talented students. With Liebig he started his own chemical research. After returning to Russia in 1838 he was appointed as assistant to Prof. Solovyov at University of St. Petersburg. In 1839 he defended his PhD on quinic acid under supervision of Germain Henri Hess, and in 1843 was promoted to professor. Hess died in 1850, and Voskresensky took over all his teaching duties, simultaneously lecturing in several St. Petersburg institutions. His students included Nikolay Beketov, Nikolai Menshutkin and Dmitri Mendeleev. After serving as rector of Saint Petersburg Imperial University in 1861–1863 and 1865–1867 he briefly moved to Kharkiv, but soon returned to St. Petersburg, where he spent his later years on improving secondary education.
