= Sergei Zhebelev =

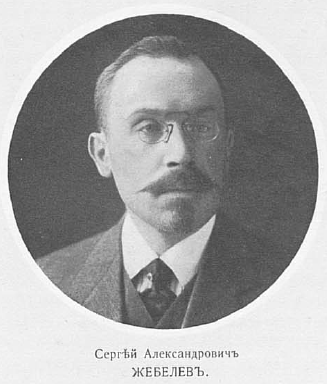
- Sergei Zhebelev
- Born: 22 September 1867; Saint Petersburg, Russian Empire
- Died: 28 December 1941 (aged 74); Leningrad, Soviet Union

Academic background
- Education: St. Petersburg University

Academic work
- Discipline: Greek history, Archaeology
- Influenced: Joseph Orbeli

Sergei Aleksandrovich Zhebelev (22 September 1867 – 28 December 1941) was a Russian historian and archaeologist who was recognised as an authority on ancient Greek history.

Zhebelev graduated from Saint Petersburg University in 1890 and was appointed professor there in 1904. He translated Plato, Aristotle, and other classical thinkers into Russian. In 1923 he produced a textbook on archaeology.

In 1921 Zhebelev reproached himself for his liberal attitude towards Jews, suggesting that he had contributed towards the Russian Revolution by allowing a Jew to remain at the university.

Zhebelev was elected to the Soviet Academy of Sciences in 1927. However he submitted an article to a book celebrating the work of Yakov Ivanovich Smirnov published by the Prague based Kondakov Seminar. His introductory article was then criticised by Ivan Luppol of the Union of Scientific Workers on the following grounds:

- Zhebelev had remarked that by 1918, the year of Smirnov's death, "the hard years had already begun"
- that the Kondakov Seminar was the best place for the book to be published as Smirnov had been a pupil of Nikodim Kondakov
- that Smirnov's research had been uninfluenced by the "science of art", sociology or "any other similar modish tendencies."

Luppol interpreted these as revealing a negative attitude to soviet science, claiming that the last point indicated a rejection of the approach of Nikolai Marr who had argued that archaeology and sociology were necessarily linked. Luppol pursued the matter with calls for Zhebelev's expulsion from the Academy of Science on the basis of new charter adopted in 1927. The Academy resisted this, citing Zhebelev's 11 year record of work, but criticised him for his participation in the publication. Zhebelev published an apology in which he criticised the historian Michael Rostovtzeff – a criticism he was to retract later in private.

He was a member of the Institute of the History of Material Culture in Leningrad, where he died of hunger during the siege in 1941. Shortly before his death he remarked to Joseph Orbeli: "I am so glad, that science continues to develop with us even under such difficult conditions. This is the way we scholars fight Fascism.”
