= Saint Petersburg Branch of the Russian Academy of Sciences =

Academic institution established in 2023

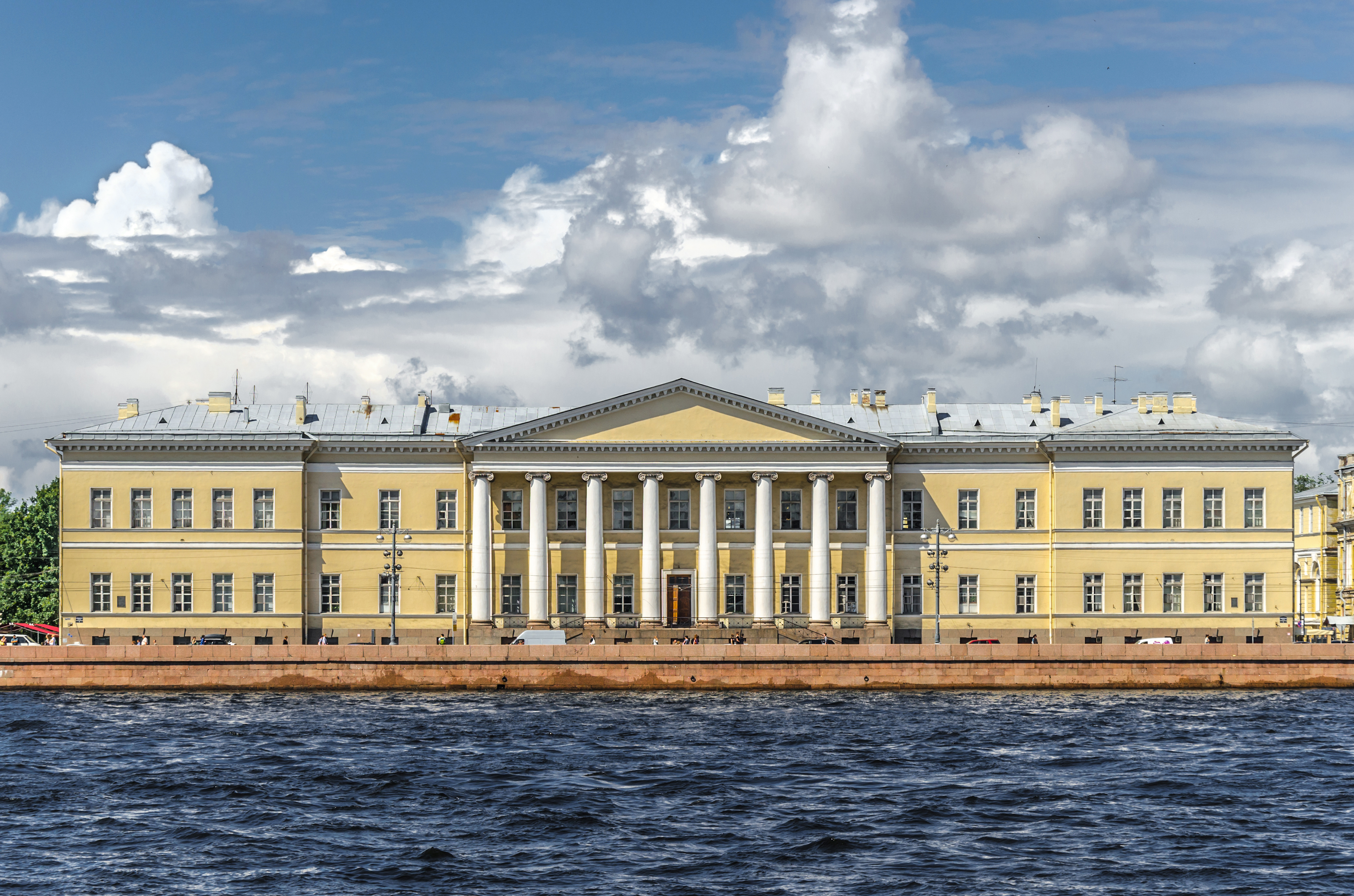
- Established: 2023; 3 years ago
- President: Andrey I. Rudskoy
- Location: Saint Petersburg, Russia

The Saint Petersburg Branch of the Russian Academy of Sciences (Russian: Санкт-Петербургское отделение Российской академии наук), official acronym SPBRAS (more natural would be SPbB RAS, Russian: СПбО РАН) is the fourth territorial branch of the Academy established in 2023 by the Decree of the Government of Russia signed by its Prime Minister Mikhail Mishustin.

The three earlier existing branches are the Ural, Siberian and Far Eastern ones.

The idea to create an additional branch was promoted by the Nobel prize laureate Zhores Alferov during many years until his death in 2019. Later, in 2022 this idea was approved by the general meeting of the Academy and finally by the Russian state authorities.

According to the decision, the St. Petersburg branch should be engaged in participation and conduct of fundamental and exploratory scientific research, forecasting the main directions of development of St. Petersburg, the Leningrad Region and, to some extent, Russia as a whole from the point of view of the scientific sphere. The activities of the new branch were launched in autumn 2023. At that time the St. Petersburg branch included 187 members. As of October 16, 2026 there were 178 members: 66 full (including 4 females) and 112 corresponding (including 14 females).

The elected chair of the St. Petersburg territorial branch is academician Andrey Rudskoy, a rector of the Peter the Great St. Petersburg Polytechnic University personally specializing in material science. The branch comprises five joint scientific councils focusing on life sciences, natural sciences, humanities, applied industrial technologies and agriculture. Along with the members of the Academy, some prominent researchers such as RAS professors are enrolled into these councils.

The office of the SPBRAS is located in the historical building (s. photo) in the Vasilyevsky Island in St. Petersburg.
