= Lyudmila Verbitskaya =

Russian linguist and teacher (1936–2019)

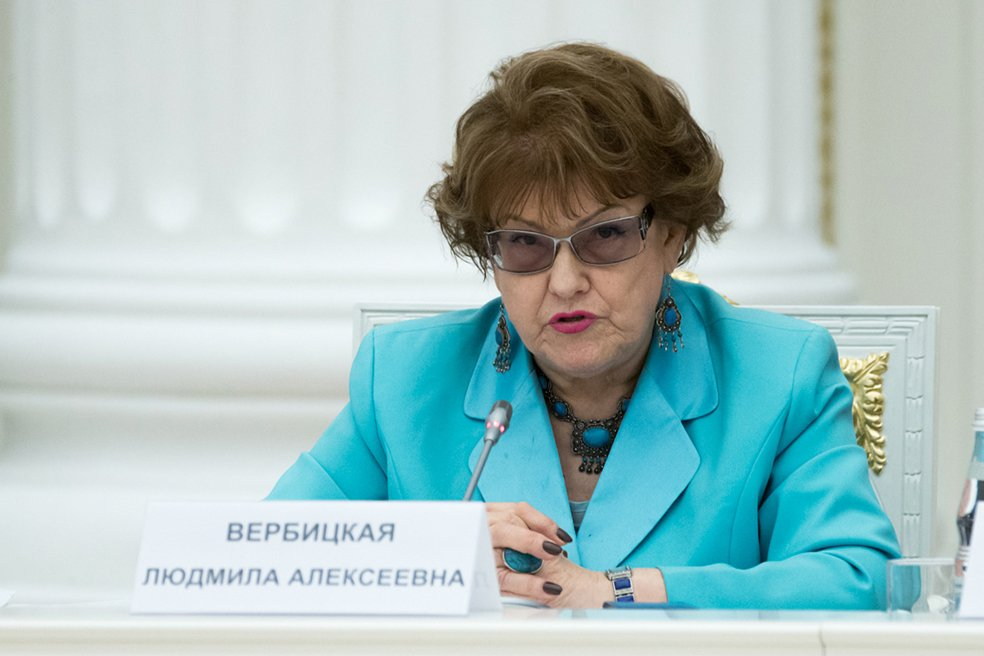
Lyudmila Verbitskaya in 2014

Lyudmila Verbitskaya (née, Lyudmila Bubnova; 17 October 1936 – 24 November 2019) was a Russian linguist and teacher. She was the former president of Saint Petersburg State University.

== Career ==
Lyudmila Alekseevna Verbitskaya was born in Leningrad on 17 October 1936.

She earned a doctorate in philology from Leningrad State University (1958). During her academic career, her research focused on Modern Russian speech, stylistics, vocabulary, and semantics.

Verbitskaya was rector (1994–2008), and then president (2008–2019) of Saint Petersburg State University. She also served as the chair of the Russian Academy of Education (during the period 11 November 2013 – 2018), and as the Academy's Honorary President, 2018–2019. She chaired the Board of Trustees of the Russkiy Mir Foundation, an organization formed for “promoting the Russian language, as Russia’s national heritage and a significant aspect of Russian and world culture, and supporting Russian language teaching programs abroad.” In addition, she served as Chair of the International Association of Russian Language and Literature Teachers (MAPRYAL), a professional organization founded in 1967.

She was a close friend of Vladimir Putin.

She died in St. Petersburg on 24 November 2019. The 49th International Scientific Philological Conference, held at St. Petersburg State University in December 2020, was dedicated to her memory.

== Key publications ==
- Verbitskaya, Nosova, Rodina. 2002. Sustainable development in higher education in Russia: The case of St. Petersburg State University. Higher Education Policy.
- Verbitskaya. 2013. Russian Language in the Late Twentieth to Early Twenty-First Centuries. Russian Journal of Communication. 5 (1). p. 64-70
- Verbitskaya, Malykh, Zinchenko. 2015. Cognitive predictors of success in learning Russian. Psychology in Russia.

== Awards ==
- 1997, Queen's Anniversary Prize for Higher and Further Education, Great Britain
- 1999, Stapenning medal, University of Amsterdam
- 2000, The International Astronomical Union named a small planet, formerly No. 7451, after Verbitskaya
- 2001, Russian Federation Presidential prize in Education
- 2006, named an Honorary Citizen of St. Petersburg
- 2007, Russian Government Prize
- 2011, Order of Honour
