= Ural Branch of the Russian Academy of Sciences =

Academic institution established in 1932

- Established: 1932; 93 years ago
- President: Victor N. Rudenko
- Location: Ekaterinburg, Russia

The Ural Branch of the Russian Academy of Sciences (UB RAS; Russian: Уральское отделение Российской академии наук, УрО РАН) is one of the (four, as of 2024) territorial branches of the Academy. It is headquartered in Ekaterinburg.

The Ural filiale of the Academy of Sciences of the USSR, a predecessor of the UB RAS, was established in 1932, with Alexander Fersman as founding chairman. In 1971 this filiale was converted into the scientific center and in 1987 into the branch of the USSR Academy; finally in 1991 at collapse of the USSR the branch received its present name.

The research units of the Ural Branch of the Russian Academy of Sciences operate over a vast territory from Arkhangelsk to Orenburg from north to south and from Tobolsk to Izhevsk from east to west. Under the aegis of the UB RAS, there are 32 scientific organizations (among which six federal-level research centers) and 18 universities. As of end-2022, the branch included 41 full and 74 corresponding members of the Academy.
