= David Grimm (lawyer) =

Russian and Estonian lawyer and politician

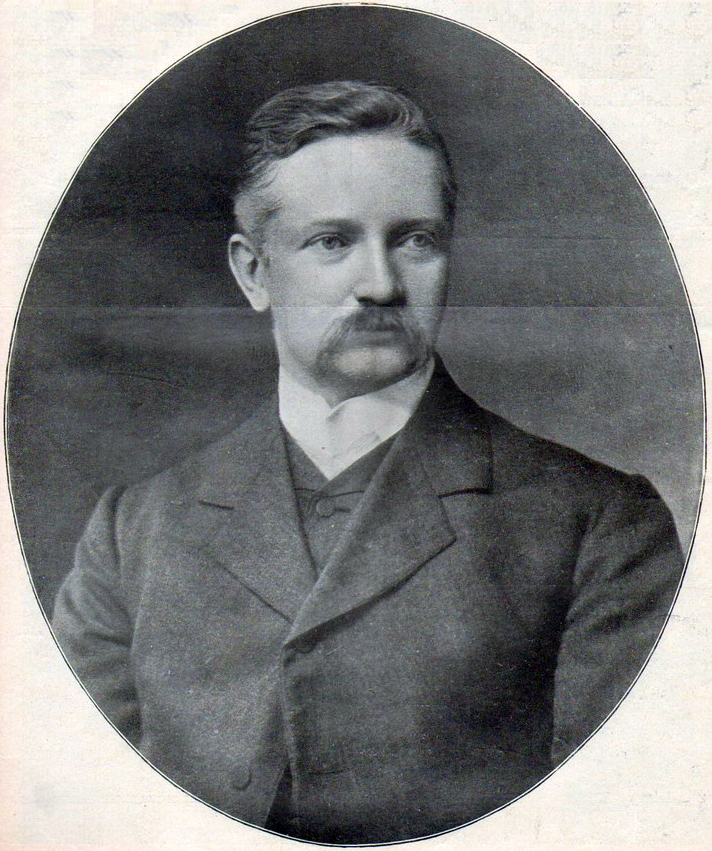
David Grimm

David Grimm (Russian: Дави́д Дави́дович Гримм, 24 January 1864 St. Petersburg – 29 July 1941 Riga) was a Russian Imperial and then Estonian lawyer and politician. He was a member of Estonian National Assembly (Estonian: Rahvuskogu).
