= 2022 address of the Russian Union of Rectors =

On 4 March 2022, the Russian Union of Rectors signed an address in support of the 2022 Russian invasion of Ukraine. The letter was signed by heads (rectors) of 304 higher education institutions in Russia. It was highly publicized inside Russia, but internationally it only led to further isolation of Russian educational institutions.

== Text ==
The Russian Union of Rectors' address speaks of the military threat to Russia coming from Ukraine. Then it speaks in support of Russian invasion of Ukraine. It states its aims as the "demilitarization and denazification of Ukraine." The address deliberately evades the word "war", which is outlawed in Russia in this context by the fake news laws. Instead, it says:

It is very important these days to support our country, our army, which defends our security, to support our President, who, perhaps, made the most difficult, hard-won but necessary decision in his life.

Next, the address calls for continuity of the educational process, says that "Universities have always been the backbone of the state" and that one of their main duties is "to instill patriotism in young people". It ends up with a call to unite around the figure of Putin.

Novaya Gazeta notes that the "hard-won but necessary decision" is an intended omission brought about by the fake news law, which forbids calling a war a war.

== Reaction ==
The address was widely covered in the Russian media. A number of signatories echoed the style and rhetoric of the address in their comments in the media or their individual addresses.

Abroad, the address provoked a sharply negative reaction and led to further isolation of Russian universities. The European University Association suspended the membership of 12 Russian universities, whose rectors had signed the address. France Universités suspended their ties with the Russian Union of Rectors. For Universities UK, the address of the Rectors' Union served as a crucial argument to condemn Russia's invasion of Ukraine.

Ukrainian universities stripped the signatories of the address of their honorary academic titles.

In Ukraine, seven rectors of medical universities who signed the address got the status of suspects in violation of the territorial integrity of Ukraine. Prosecutor General Iryna Venediktova stated that measures will be taken to put the signatories on the international wanted list for the purpose of their arrest and extradition to Ukraine.

On March 16, 2022, the Free Russia Forum included all signatories in its sanctions "Putin List".

Students, teachers, and graduates of Moscow State University published an open letter to Rector Viktor Sadovnichiy demanding to revoke his signature.

According to Novaya Gazeta, the appeals formulated in the address were subsequently used by universities to expel students detained at protests against Russia's invasion of Ukraine.

== Signatories ==
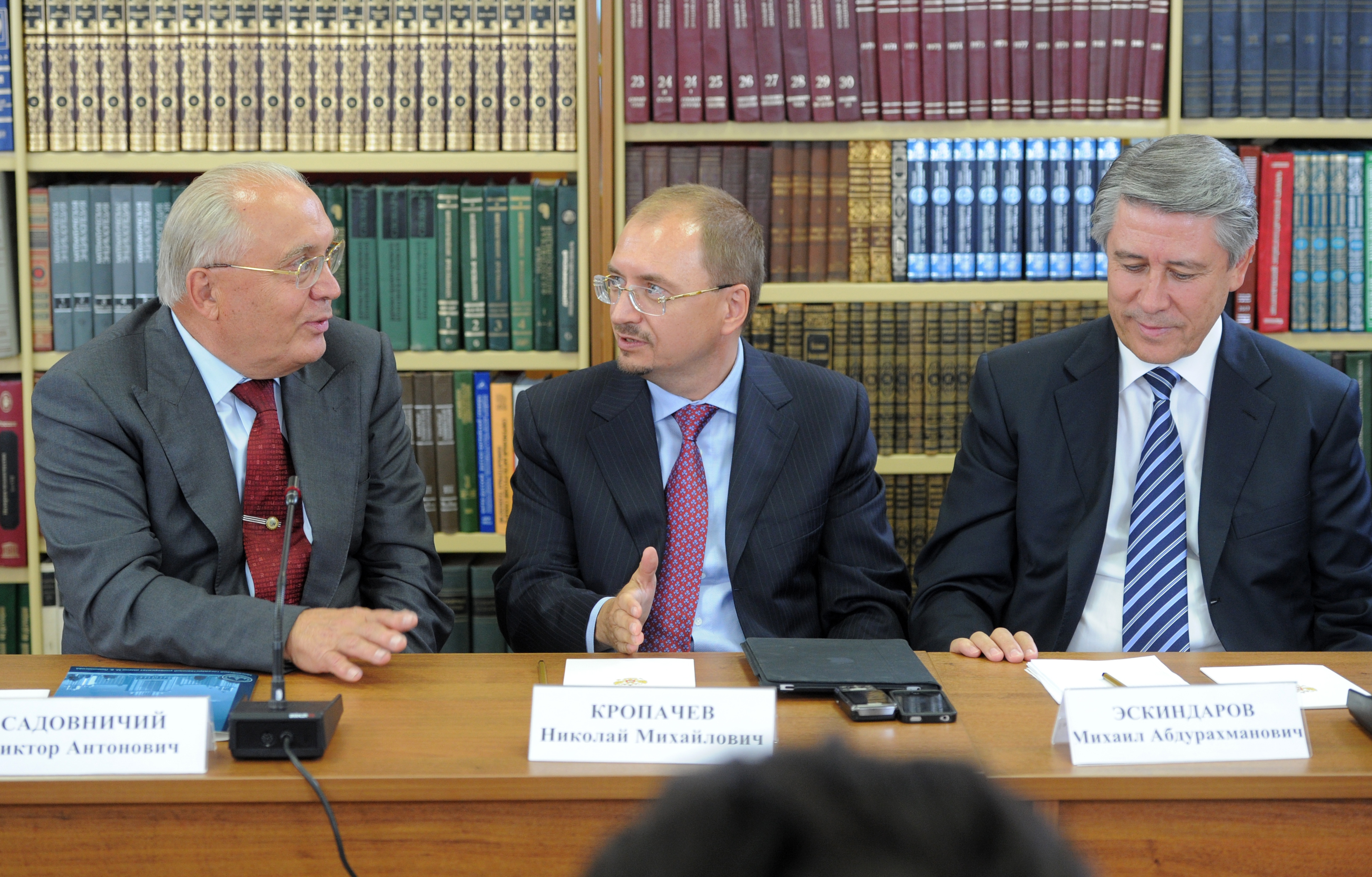
Signatories of the address Sadovnichiy, Kropachev, and Eskindarov

Famous signatories include:

- Viktor Sadovnichiy, rector of Moscow State University
- Anatoly Alexandrov, rector of the Bauman Moscow State Technical University
- Nikolay Kudryavtsev, rector of Moscow Institute of Physics and Technology
- Vladimir Litvinenko, rector of Saint Petersburg Mining University
- Mikhail Fedoruk, rector of Novosibirsk State University
- Petr Glybochko, rector of the First Moscow State Medical University
- Aleksey Demidov, rector of Saint Petersburg State University of Industrial Technologies and Design
- Dmitry Endovitsky, rector of Voronezh State University
- Sergey Ivanchenko, rector of Pacific National University
- Nikolay Kropachev, rector of Saint Petersburg State University
- Vladimir Lobanov, president of Kuban State Technological University
- Nikolay Pustovoy, president of Novosibirsk State Technical University
- Roman Strongin, president of the N. I. Lobachevsky State University of Nizhny Novgorod
- Alexander Shestakov, rector of the South Ural State University
- Mikhail Eskindarov, president of the Financial University under the Government of the Russian Federation
- Marina Borovskaya, rector of the Southern Federal University
- Vladimir Vasilyev, rector of the ITMO University
- Nikolay Morozkin, rector of Bashkir State University
- Vladimir Mau, rector of the Russian Presidential Academy of National Economy and Public Administration
- Nikolay Rogalev, rector of Moscow Power Engineering Institute
- Stanislav Prokofiev, rector of Financial University under the Government of the Russian Federation
- Mikhail Pogosyan, rector of Moscow Aviation Institute
- Sergei Shlyk, rector of Rostov State Medical University
- Vladimir Filippov, rector of the Peoples' Friendship University of Russia
- Anatoly Torkunov, rector of Moscow State Institute of International Relations

== See also ==
- Manifesto of the Ninety-Three (1914)
- Vow of allegiance of the Professors of the German Universities and High-Schools to Adolf Hitler and the National Socialistic State (1933)
