= Pavel Ipatov =

Pavel Ipatov may refer to:

- Pavel Ipatov (economist) (1914–1994), Soviet economist
- Pavel Ipatov (politician) (born 1950), Russian politician

== See also ==
- Ipatov
