= Alexei Likhachyov =

Soviet medic and politician

- Born: Alexei Ilyich Likhachyov; 1894; Serpukhov, Moscow Governorate, Russian Empire
- Died: 5 January 1948 (aged 53–54); Cheboksary, RSFSR, Soviet Union
- Occupations: Medic and statesman

Alexei Ilyich Likhachyov (Russian: Алексей Ильич Лихачёв; 1894, Serpukhov, Moscow Governorate – 5 January 1948, Cheboksary) was a Soviet medic and statesman. He was the Director of Rostov State Medical University from 1930 to 1935 and Minister of Health of the Chuvash Autonomous Soviet Socialist Republic from 1946 to 1947.

== Biography ==
Likhachyov was born in 1894 in Serpukhov, Moscow Governorate. In 1919 he graduated from the Medical Faculty of Moscow Imperial University. Soon after that, he was mobilized into the Red Army and took part in the Russian Civil War.

After the end of the war he worked in different places: he was the head of the City Health Department in Ufa (1922–1925), the head of the Health Department of Astrakhan Oblast (1925–1928), the head of Health Department of Tersky District (1928–1930), the Director of Rostov Medical Institute (now Rostov State Medical University) (1930–1935), the head of the Regional Health Department of North Caucasus (1935–36), and was the Chief Physician of Rostov Clinical Hospital (1936–1941).

With the outbreak of WWII, in June 1941, Likhachyov was appointed People's Commissar of Health of the Chuvash Autonomous Soviet Socialist Republic. From 1946 to 1947 he held the post of Minister of Health of the Chuvash Autonomous Soviet Socialist Republic. During his time in office, he supervised the arrangement of the network of medical and preventive institutions in the republic and its sanitary and epidemiological status.

He died on 5 January 1948 in Cheboksary.
