= Anatoly Alexandrov =

Anatoly Alexandrov may refer to:

- Anatoly Alexandrov (composer) (1888–1982), Soviet composer and People's Artist of the USSR
- Anatoly Alexandrov (physicist) (1903–1994), Soviet/Russian physicist and academician
- Anatoly Alexandrov (engineer) (born 1951), Soviet and Russian engineer, rector of the Bauman Moscow State Technical University
- Anatoly Alexandrov (boxer) (born 1967), Russian boxer
