= Vladimir Shcherbakov (politician) =

Politician

- Владимир Щербаков

Rector of the Moscow Financial Institute
- In office 1953–1985
- Preceded by: Nikolai Rovinsky
- Succeeded by: Alla Gryaznova

Personal details
- Born: February 26, 1909 Yuzovka, Russian Empire
- Died: April 17, 1985 (aged 76) Moscow, USSR
- Party: Communist Party of the Soviet Union (1939-1985)
- Occupation: economist
- Known for: Rector of the Moscow Institute of Finance
- Awards: Order of Lenin; Order of the Patriotic War (2nd class); Order of the Patriotic War (1st class); Order of the Red Banner of Labor (twice)

Vladimir Vasilyevich Shcherbakov (26 February 1909 – April 17 1985) was a Soviet economist and politician, director/rector of the Moscow Institute of Finance (1953–1985), and Deputy of the Supreme Soviet of the USSR of the 3rd convocation (1950–1954).

== Biography ==
Shcherbakov was born in 1909 in Yuzovka (now Donetsk, Ukraine).

In 1930, he graduated from Kharkiv Engineering and Economic Institute and attended the institute's graduate school until 1935.

From 1935 until 1938 he served at the Department of Political Economy, after which he served as Associate Professor at the Kharkiv Polytechnic Institute.

In 1939, Shcherbakov became the Secretary of the Kharkiv Regional Committee of the Komsomol, then as Deputy Head of the Propaganda and Agitation Department of the Komsomol Central Committee in Moscow.

From 1942 until 1943 he served as Deputy Head of the Political Administration of the Soviet Union's People's Commissariat for Agriculture, and then as the Deputy Head of the Personnel Department of the Central Committee of the All-Union Communist Party (Bolsheviks) until 1946.

From March 1946 until June 1947 Shcherbakov was the Chairman of the Bureau of the Central Committee of the All-Union Communist Party of Bolsheviks in the Lithuanian Soviet Socialist Republic.

In June 1947, Shcherbakov was appointed as First Secretary of the Kaliningrad Regional Committee of the All-Union Communist Party (Bolsheviks) which he held until July 1951. After this he worked as Deputy Minister of Cinematography of the USSR until July 1953.

In August 1953, he became Director, later Rector of the Moscow Institute of Finance and held this role until his death in 1985.

Shcherbakov became a professor at the Department of Political Economy in 1967 and a member of the Editorial Board of the “Bulletin of Higher School”.

While in that office, he was a member of the Supreme Soviet of the Soviet Union, 3rd convocation (1950–1954).

== Honors and awards ==
- Order of Lenin (1947)
- Order of the Patriotic War, 2nd class
- Order of the Patriotic War, 1st class (1945)
- 2 Orders of the Red Banner of Labor

Academic offices
Preceded by Nikolai Rovinsky (1946–1953)	Rector of the Financial University under the Government of the Soviet Union; 1953–1985	Succeeded by Alla Gryaznova (1985–2006)
