= Ipatov =

Ipatov (Russian: Ипатов) is a Russian masculine surname originating from the given name Ipaty or its short version Ipat; the feminine counterpart is Ipatova. The surname may refer to

- Alexander Ipatov (born 1993), Ukrainian chess grandmaster
- Dimitry Ipatov (born 1984), Russian ski jumper
- Pavel Ipatov (1914–1994), Soviet economist
- Pavel Ipatov (born 1950), Russian politician
- Sergei Ipatov (born 1952), Russian astronomer
  - 14360 Ipatov, a main-belt asteroid, named after Sergey Ipatov

== See also ==
- Lipatov
