= Mikhail Eskindarov =

Russian economist

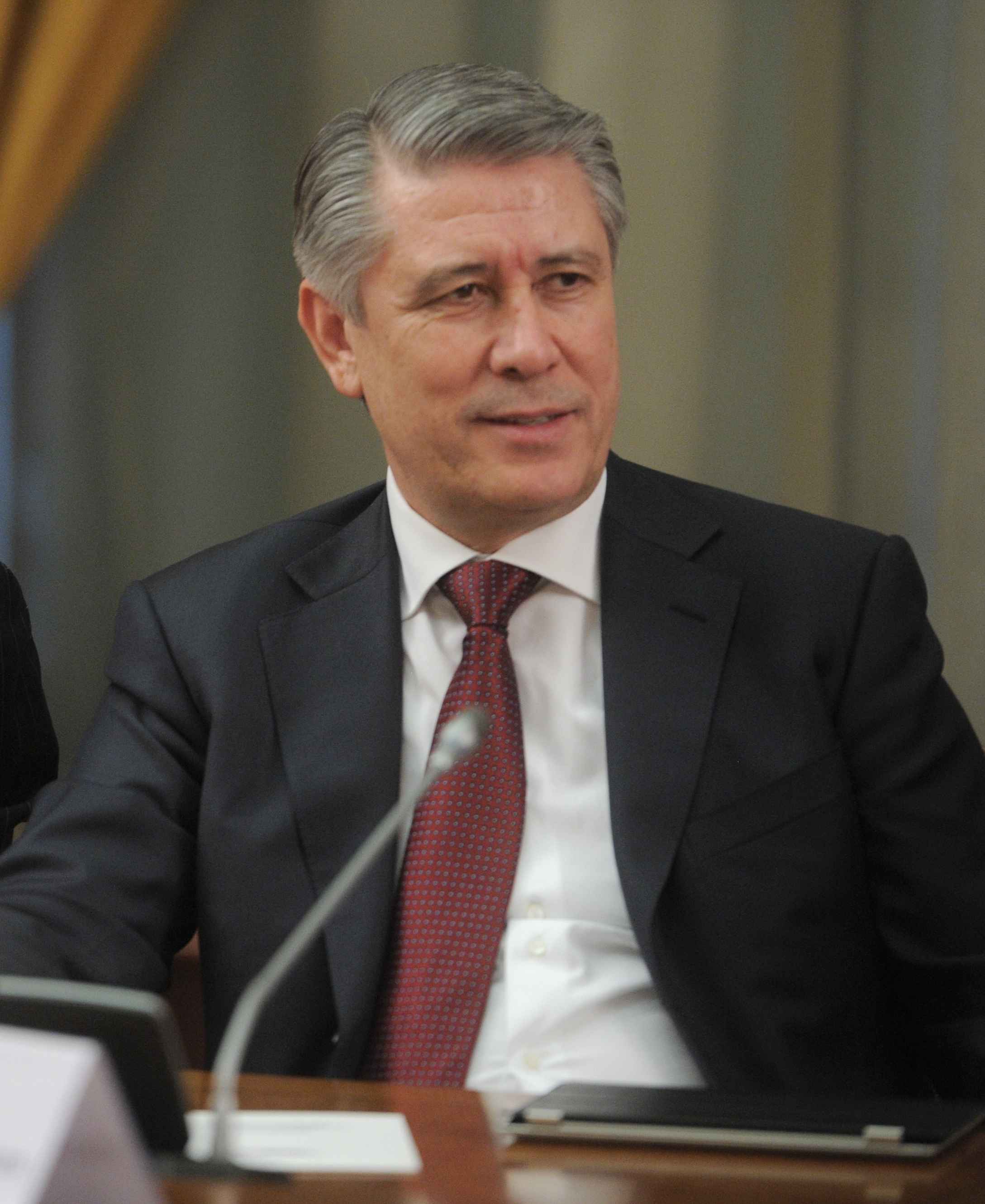

Rector of the Financial University under the Government of the Russian Federation
- In office 2006–2021

Personal details
- Born: November 15, 1951 (age 74) Karachay-Cherkessia, Soviet Union
- Occupation: economist

Mikhail (Mukhadin) Abdurakhmanovich Eskindarov (November 15, 1951, Besleney village, Karachay-Cherkessia, Soviet Union) is a Russian economist.

== Early life ==
In 1976, he graduated from the Credit and Economics Faculty of the Moscow Financial Institute. From 1976 to 1981 he attended graduate school at the university.

== Career ==
From 1981-1982 he served as Assistant, Department of Political Economy, Moscow Financial Institute. In 1981 he became Deputy Dean of the Faculty of Finance and Economics and Assistant, Senior Lecturer at the Department of Political Economy. From 1982-1984 he headed the personnel department. From 1984-1987 he was Dean of the Faculty of International Economic Relations.

From 1987 to 1991 he headed the group of Soviet teachers of the University of Aden.

From 1991 to 2002 he served as Vice-Rector for Academic Affairs, First Vice-Rector for Academic Affairs and Professor at the Department of World Economy and International Monetary and Credit Relations.

From 2002 to 2006 he served as First Vice-Rector of the Financial Academy.

From 2006 to 2021 he served as rector of Financial University under the Government of the Russian Federation.

In 2022, he signed the Address of the Russian Union of Rectors, which called to support Putin in his invasion of Ukraine.

== Accomplishments ==
Eskindarov initiated and led the process of transforming a university into a multi-disciplinary one and modernizing the content of its educational and scientific activities, as well as its structure. He established the International Faculty of Finance teaching all subjects in English., with the aim of exporting educational services. He created new faculties and departments, and opened research institutes and centers.

He heads the Academic council of the Financial University. He served as chair of dissertation councils for defending candidate and doctoral dissertations in multiple specialties: “World Economy” and “Economics and Management of National Economy: Economics of Entrepreneurship, Marketing, Management”.

Eskindarov is the author of about 500 scientific papers, monographs, textbooks and articles.

== Recognition ==
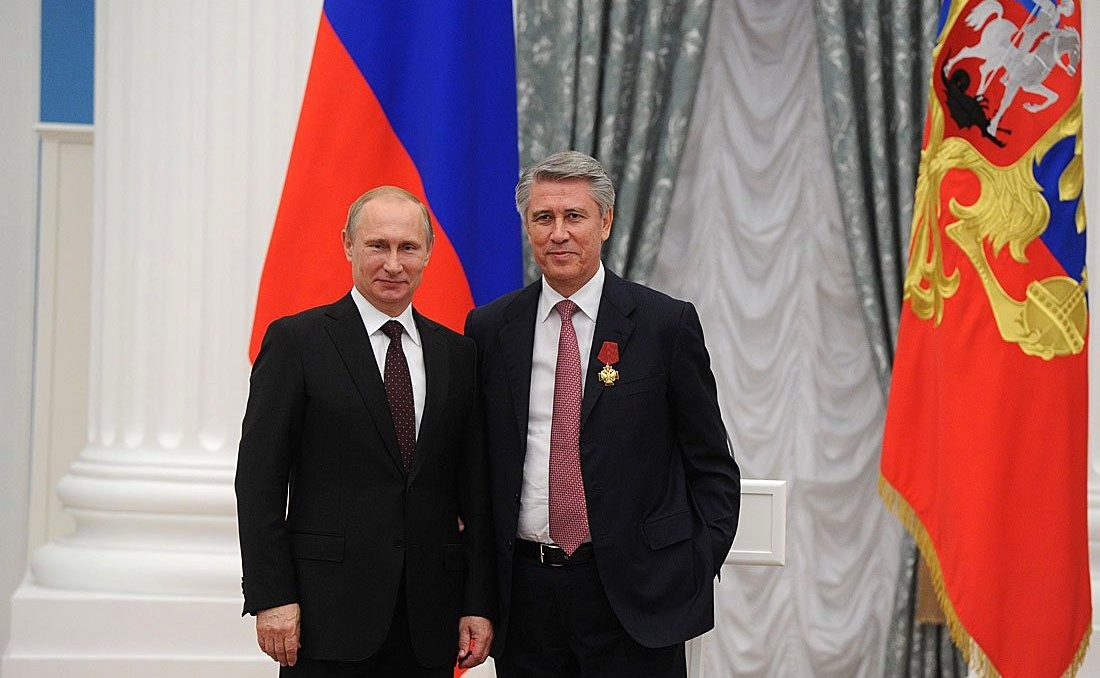
Mikhail Eskindarov and Vladimir Putin at the award ceremony, 31 July 2014

- Order of Friendship (1996)
- Honored Worker of Higher Professional Education of the Russian Federation (1997)
- Honored Scientist of the Russian Federation (2009)
- Winner of the Prize of the President of the Russian Federation in the field of education (2000)
- Winner of the "Best Manager 2001" award in the field of education
- Winner of the program “Financier of the Year” (2002)
- Honored Scientist of Kalmykia, Ingushetia, Karachay-Cherkessia, Kabardino-Balkaria, Buryatia
- Honorary Doctor of the T. Ryskulov Kazakh University of Economics (2009)
- Winner of the Prize of the Government of the Russian Federation in the field of education (2010)
- Certificate of Honor of the Council of Federation of the Federal Assembly of the Russian Federation (2011)
- Order of Friendship of the Socialist Republic of Vietnam (2011)
- Doctor Honoris Causa (2011), Dimitar A. Tsenov Academy of Economics - Svishtov, Bulgaria
- Order "For Merit to the Fatherland", IV class (2014)
- Stolypin Medal, II class (2016)

Academic offices
Preceded by Alla Gryaznova (1985–2006)	Rector of the Financial University under the Government of the Russian Federation; 2006–2021	Succeeded by Stanislav Prokofiev (2021–present)
