= Sona Akhundova-Bagirbekova =

Azerbaijani and Soviet ophthalmologist

- Sona Axundova-Bağırbəyova
- Born: 23 August 1886
- Died: 27 January 1982 (aged 95); Baku, Soviet Union
- Citizenship: Azerbaijan
- Awards: Order of Lenin; Honored Scientist of the Azerbaijan SSR
- Scientific career
- Fields: ophthalmology
- Institutions: Azerbaijan Scientific Research Institute of Ophthalmology

Sona Abdul gizi Akhundova-Bagirbekova (Azerbaijani: Sona Əbdül qızı Axundova-Bağırbəyova; 23 August 1886 – 27 January 1982) was an Azerbaijani and Soviet ophthalmologist, Doctor of Medical Sciences, Professor (1952), Honored Doctor of the Azerbaijan SSR (1960), Honored Scientist of the Azerbaijan SSR (1964).

== Early life and education ==
Sona Akhundova was born in 1886.

Having graduated from the Medical Faculty of the Moscow State University in 1923, she started to work at the Azerbaijan Scientific Research Institute for Ophthalmology, first holding the position of Head of the Eye Injury Department and then Deputy Director of the Institute for Scientific Work

== Career ==
Akhundova-Bagirbekova was considered a highly qualified specialist of the Azerbaijan Scientific Research Institute. She was also a professor at the department of eye diseases at the Azerbaijan State Institute for Advanced Training of Doctors named after Aziz Aliyev.

In the 1940s, Akhundova-Bagirbekova completed qualification courses in keratoplasty at the Odessa Research Institute of Eye Diseases and in subsequent years maintained close scientific ties with this institute. Many of her scientific works were devoted to the problems of keratoplasty, trachoma and tissue therapy of eye diseases. Being a student and follower of the famous academician Vladimir Filatov, Akhundova-Bagirbekova was the first in Azerbaijan and the Transcaucasia to apply the methods of keratoplasty and tissue therapy for a number of eye diseases.

During World War II Akhundova-Bagirbekova was among the doctors who, on the basis of clinical hospitals, provided treatment and rehabilitation of the wounded and was awarded the country's highest award – the Order of Lenin.

In 1951, Akhundova-Bagirbekova defended a thesis for the degree of Doctor of Medical Sciences at the Azerbaijan Medical Institute on the topic “Corneal transplantation with homogeneous and heterogeneous tissues,” proposing a new way of corneal transplant and a more accessible method of eye preservation.

Akhundova-Bagirbekova was an active promoter of the development of ophthalmic surgery in Azerbaijan and did a lot to raise ophthalmic surgery in the republic to the level of advanced ophthalmological centers. She also made a substantial contribution to the elimination of trachoma and treatment of non-infectious eye diseases widespread in Azerbaijan. For many years Akhundova-Bagirbekova worked as an ophthalmologist in the Baku leper colony.

Akhundova-Bagirbekova played an important role in the development and improvement of ophthalmology in Azerbaijan. Under her guidance, many doctoral and candidate dissertations in the field of ophthalmology were defended.

Akhundova-Bagirbekova was awarded several orders and medals, as well as the title of Honored Scientist of Azerbaijan.

Sona Akhundova-Bagirbekova died in 1982.

== Awards and honors ==
=== Awards ===
- Honored Doctor Azerbaijan Republic – 1960
- Honored Scientist of Azerbaijan – 1964

=== Orders ===
- Order of Lenin – 1946
- Red Banner of Labour – 1960

=== Medals ===
- For the defense of the Caucasus – 1944
- For valiant labor in the Great Patriotic War – 1946
- In Commemoration of the 100th Anniversary of the Birth of Vladimir Ilyich Lenin – 1970
