= Alla Gryaznova =

Russian economist (born 1937)

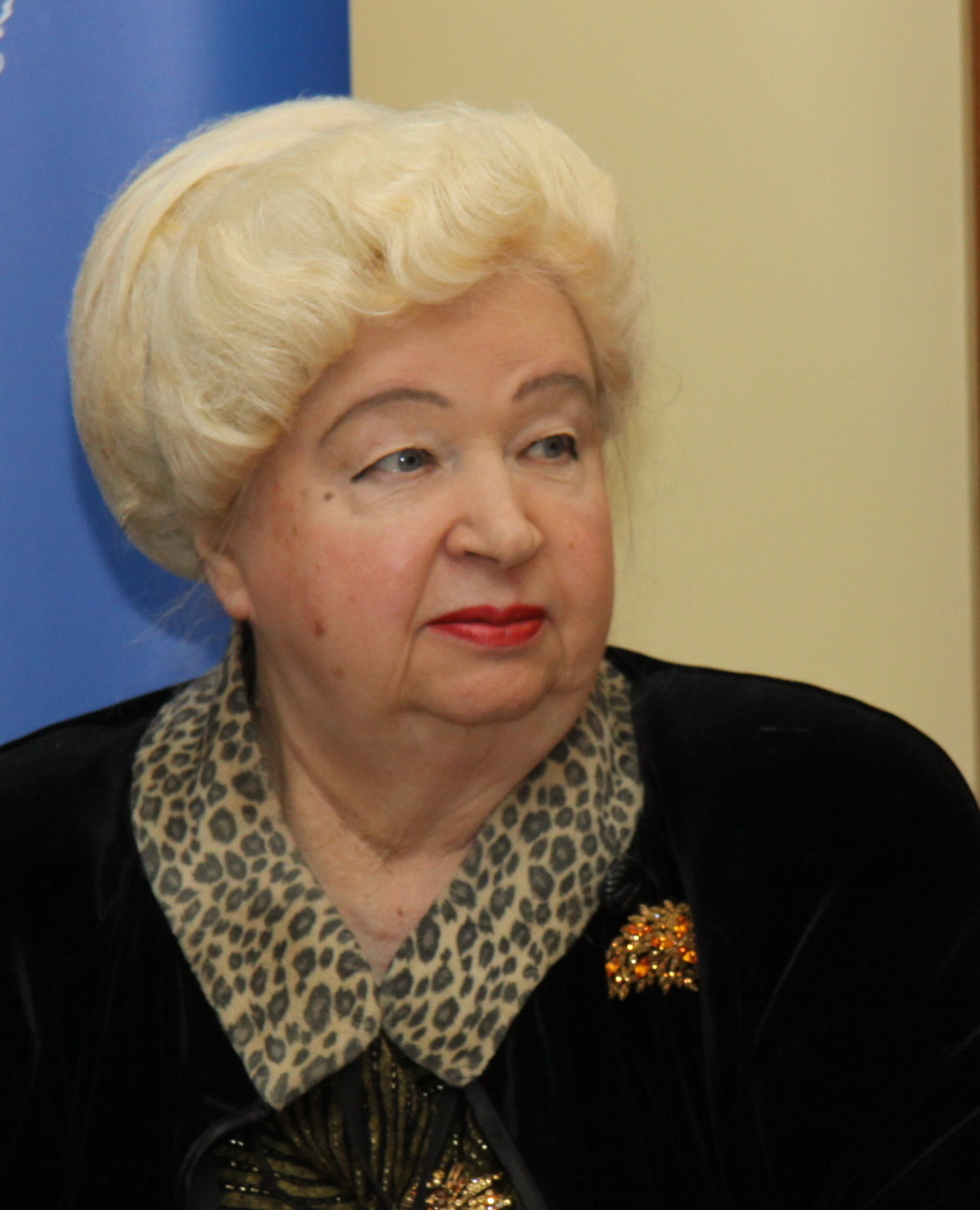
- Gryaznova in 1910

Rector of the Financial University under the Government of the Russian Federation
- In office 1985–2006

Personal details
- Born: November 27, 1937 (age 88) Moscow, Soviet Union
- Occupation: Economist

Alla Georgievna Gryaznova (born November 27, 1937) is a Russian economist, full Ph.D. in Economics, a rector of Financial University under the Government of the Russian Federation (1985–2006).

== Early life ==
Georgievna was born in on November 27, 1937, in Moscow. Her mother worked as an accountant, and her father was a driver. She has three younger siblings.

In 1955, Georgievna graduated from the Moscow Finance College. Then, in 1959, she graduated from the Moscow Financial Institute. From 1961 to 1964 she attended graduate school at the university.

== Career ==
From 1964, Georgievna served as Assistant, Department of Political Economy, Moscow Financial Institute.

In 1969, Georgievna became Senior Lecturer, Associate Professor at the Department of Political Economy.

In 1976, Georgievna became full Ph.D. in Economics.

From 1976 to 1985, Georgievna served as Vice-Rector for Research and International Relations.

From 1985 to 2006, Georgievna served as Rector of the Financial Academy.

In 2006, Georgievna became president, in 2021 – Honored President of Financial Academy, later Financial University under the Government of the Russian Federation.

== Accomplishments ==
Gryaznova made a significant contribution to the development of the theoretical foundations of many applied subjects, such as banking, economic analysis, auditing, accounting, and insurance.

Gryaznova initiated and led the process of developing of the concept of education in the field of finance and banking in Russia until 2010.

She headed the Academic council of the Financial Academy and served as chair of dissertation councils for defending candidate and doctoral dissertations in economic sciences.

Gryaznova is a major specialist in the field of economic sciences, the author of more than 300 scientific papers, monographs, textbooks and articles. Her three-volume monograph “Banking system of Russia. Banker's Handbook” was awarded the Prize of the President of the Russian Federation.

Gryaznova is a prominent scientific and public figure in Russia. She is the Deputy Chairman of the Higher Attestation Commission of the Ministry of Education of the Russian Federation, Vice-President of the Academy of Management and Market, Member of the Association of Banks of Russia, Member of the International Fiscal Association, Member of the Asia-Pacific Economic Cooperation (APEC) inter-governmental forum.

== Honors and awards ==
- Order "For Merit to the Fatherland": 4th class (2002), 3rd class (2006).
- Honored Scientist of the Russian Federation (1997)

Academic offices
Preceded by Vladimir Shcherbakov (1953–1985)	Rector of the Financial University under the Government of the Russian Federation; 1985–2006	Succeeded by Mikhail Eskindarov (2006–2021)
