= Medal "For Valiant Labour in the Great Patriotic War 1941–1945" =

World War II civilian labour award of the Soviet Union

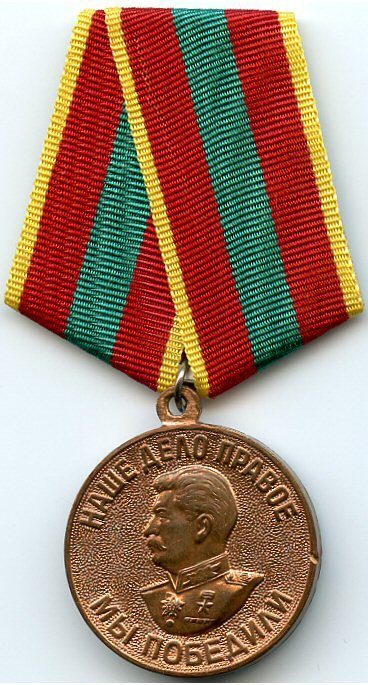
- Medal "For Valiant Labour in the Great Patriotic War 1941–1945" (obverse)
- Type: War medal
- Awarded for: 1 year of wartime labour
- Presented by: USSR
- Eligibility: Soviet citizens
- Campaign: 1941–45
- Established: June 6, 1945

Highlights
- Total: 16,096,750
- Ribbon of the Medal "For Valiant Labour in the Great Patriotic War 1941–1945"

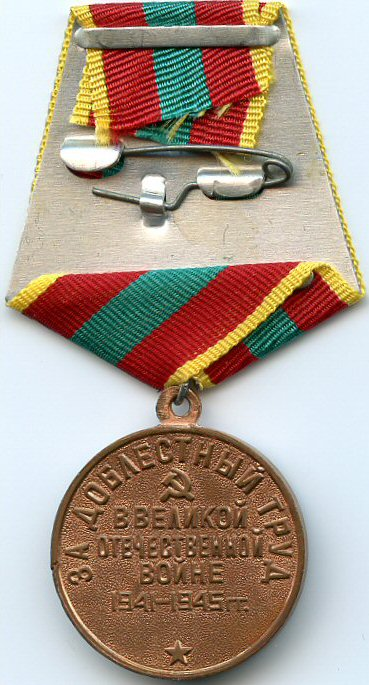
Reverse of the Medal "For Valiant Labour in the Great Patriotic War 1941–1945"

The Medal "For Valiant Labour in the Great Patriotic War 1941–1945" (Russian: медаль «За доблестный труд в Великой Отечественной войне 1941–1945 гг.») was a World War II civilian labour award of the Soviet Union established on June 6, 1945 by decree of the Presidium of the Supreme Soviet of the USSR to recognise the valiant and selfless labour of Soviet citizens in the Soviet Union's victory over Nazi Germany in the Great Patriotic War. Its statute was later amended by decree of the Presidium of the Supreme Soviet of the USSR on July 18, 1980.

== Medal statute ==
The Medal "For Valiant Labour in the Great Patriotic War 1941–1945" was awarded for wartime labour of one year or six months in the case of disabled veterans, to:

- workers, technical personnel and employees of industry and transport;
- farmers and agricultural specialists;
- workers in science, technology, the arts and literature;
- employees of the Soviet, party, trade union and other civic organizations.

Presentation of the award of the Medal "For Valiant Labour in the Great Patriotic War of 1941–1945" was made by the executive committees of city and district Soviets on the basis of documents issued by the heads of enterprises, institutions, party, government, trade unions and other civic organizations. Lists submitted for the award of the medal were reviewed and approved:

- for workers of industrial enterprises, transport, and farms – the relevant People's Commissars of the Union and the Republican People's Commissars;
- for workers of collective farms, cooperatives and of the workers' party, Soviet, trade union and other public organizations – the Chairman of the Presidium of the Supreme Soviets of the Union (not divided into regions), and autonomous republics, the chairmen of executive committees of regional and territorial Soviets;
- for workers of science, technology, the arts and literature – the chairmen of the committees under the SNK and the heads of the departments under the CPC union and autonomous republics, and the chairman of the Presidium of the Union of Soviet Writers.

Award of the Medal "For Valiant Labour in the Great Patriotic War 1941–1945" was made on behalf of the Presidium of the Supreme Soviet by executive committees of regional, district and city Soviets in the area of residence of the recipient.

The Medal "For Valiant Labour in the Great Patriotic War 1941–1945" was worn on the left side of the chest and when in the presence of other Orders and medals of the USSR, was located immediately after the Medal "For the Liberation of Prague". If worn in the presence of awards of the Russian Federation, the latter have precedence.

Each medal came with an attestation of award, this attestation came in the form of a small 8 cm by 11 cm cardboard booklet bearing the award's name, the recipient's particulars and an official stamp and signature on the inside.

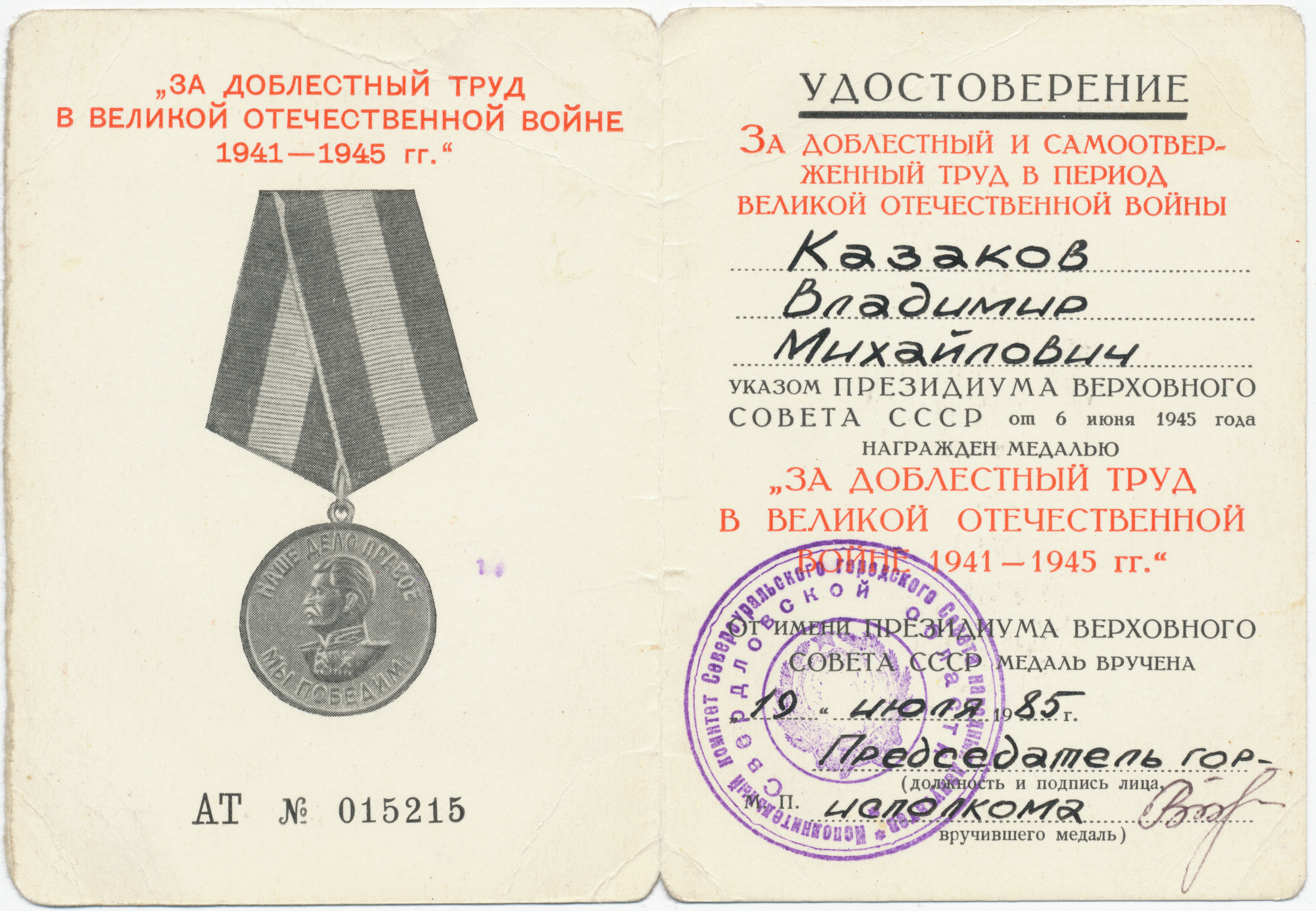
The certificate of the award of the Medal "For Valiant Labour in the Great Patriotic War 1941–1945" ("Soviet" version)

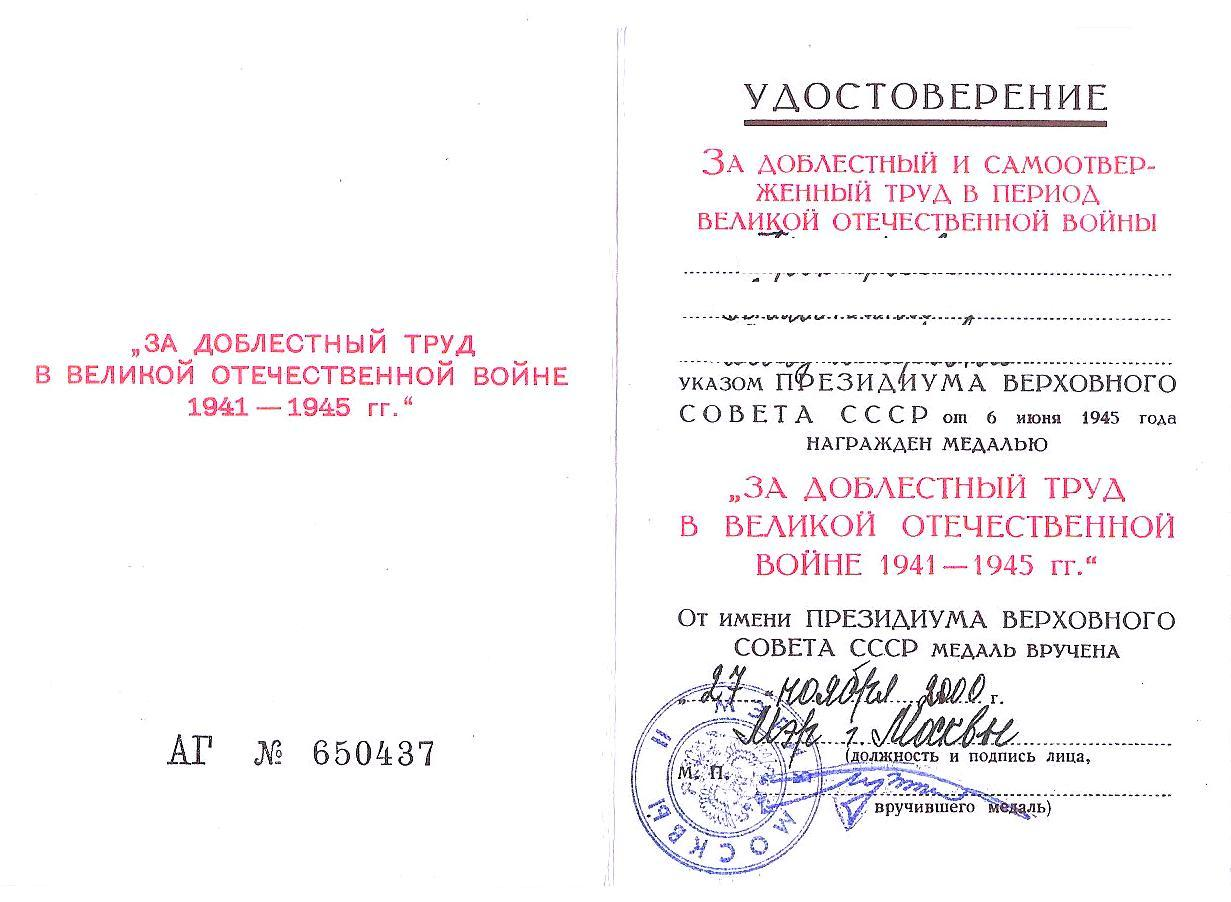
Attestion of award of the Medal "For Valiant Labour in the Great Patriotic War 1941–1945"

== Medal description ==
The Medal "For Valiant Labour in the Great Patriotic War 1941–1945" was a 32mm in diameter circular copper medal with a raised rim on both sides. On the obverse, the left profile bust of Joseph Stalin wearing the uniform of a Marshal of the Soviet Union, along the upper circumference of the medal, the relief inscription "OUR CAUSE IS JUST" (Russian: НАШЕ ДЕЛО ПРАВОЕ), along the lower circumference of the medal, the relief inscription "WE HAVE WON" (Russian: МЫ ПОБЕДИЛИ). On the reverse along the upper circumference of the medal, the relief inscription "FOR VALIANT LABOUR" (Russian: «ЗА ДОБЛЕСТНЫЙ ТРУД»), in the center, under a relief hammer and sickle, the inscription on four lines "THE GREAT PATRIOTIC WAR 1941–1945" (Russian: «В ВЕЛИКОЙ ОТЕЧЕСТВЕННОЙ ВОЙНЕ 1941–1945 ГГ.»), at the bottom, a small relief five pointed star.

The Medal "For Valiant Labour in the Great Patriotic War 1941–1945" was secured by a ring through the medal suspension loop to a standard Soviet pentagonal mount covered by a 24mm wide red silk moiré ribbon with 2mm wide yellow edge stripes and a 7mm wide green central stripe.

== Recipients (partial list) ==
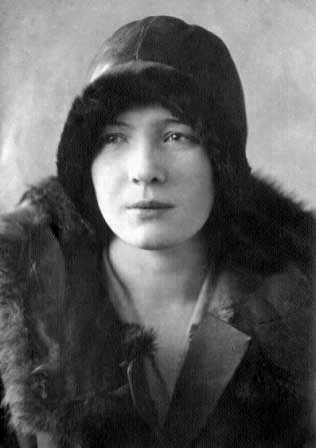
Wartime Leningrad radio broadcaster and recipient of the Medal "For Valiant Labour in the Great Patriotic War 1941–1945" Olga Bergholz

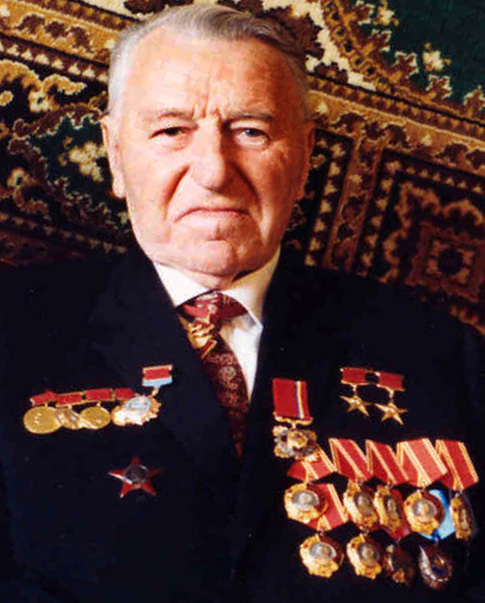
Wartime artillery factory engineer and recipient of the Medal "For Valiant Labour in the Great Patriotic War 1941–1945" Sergey Aleksandrovich Afanasyev

The individuals below were recipients of the Medal "For Valiant Labour in the Great Patriotic War 1941–1945".

- Fifth General Secretary of the Communist Party of the Soviet Union Konstantin Ustinovich Chernenko
- Cellist and conductor Mstislav Leopoldovich Rostropovich
- Physicist Alexander Mikhaylovich Prokhorov
- Wartime factory worker, later cosmonaut Pavel Ivanovich Belyayev
- Composer Aram Ilyich Khachaturian
- Theoretical physicist, astrophysicist and Nobel Prize winner Vitaly Lazarevich Ginzburg
- Composer, pianist and leader of the Union of Soviet Composers Tikhon Nikolayevich Khrennikov
- Rocket engineer Valentin Petrovich Glushko
- Poet and wartime Leningrad radio broadcaster Olga Fyodorovna Bergholz
- President of the Academy of Sciences of Ukraine Oleksandr Oleksandrovych Bohomolets
- People's Artist of the USSR Nikolay Aleksandrovich Annenkov
- Founder of Russian neurosurgery Nikolay Nilovich Burdenko
- People's Artist of the USSR Oleg Aleksandrovich Strizhenov
- Film director, editor, and screenwriter Georgi Nikolaevich Vasilyev
- Major General Alexander Nikolaevich Poskrebyshev
- Writer Alexander Serafimovich Popov
- Crystallographer, geochemist, academician and Hero of Socialist Labour Nikolay Vasilyevich Belov
- Wartime artillery factory engineer Sergey Aleksandrovich Afanasyev
- Moscow Russian Army Theatre member for 60 years, actor Vladimir Mikhailovich Zeldin
- Azerbaijani ophthalmologist Sona Akhundova-Bagirbekova
- Geologist Valentina Galaktionovna Morozova
- Military Surgeon Galina Shatalova
- Geologist Yekaterina Alexandrovna Ankinovich
- Philologist Lydia Petrovna Vasikova
- Playwright Kasymaly Jantöshev
- Surgeon Peter Herzen
- Archbishop Philip Stavitsky

== See also ==
- Awards and decorations of the Soviet Union
- Great Patriotic War
- Medal "For the Victory over Germany in the Great Patriotic War 1941–1945"
