= Saint Petersburg State University of Industrial Technologies and Design =

- Санкт-Петербургский государственный университет промышленных технологий и дизайна
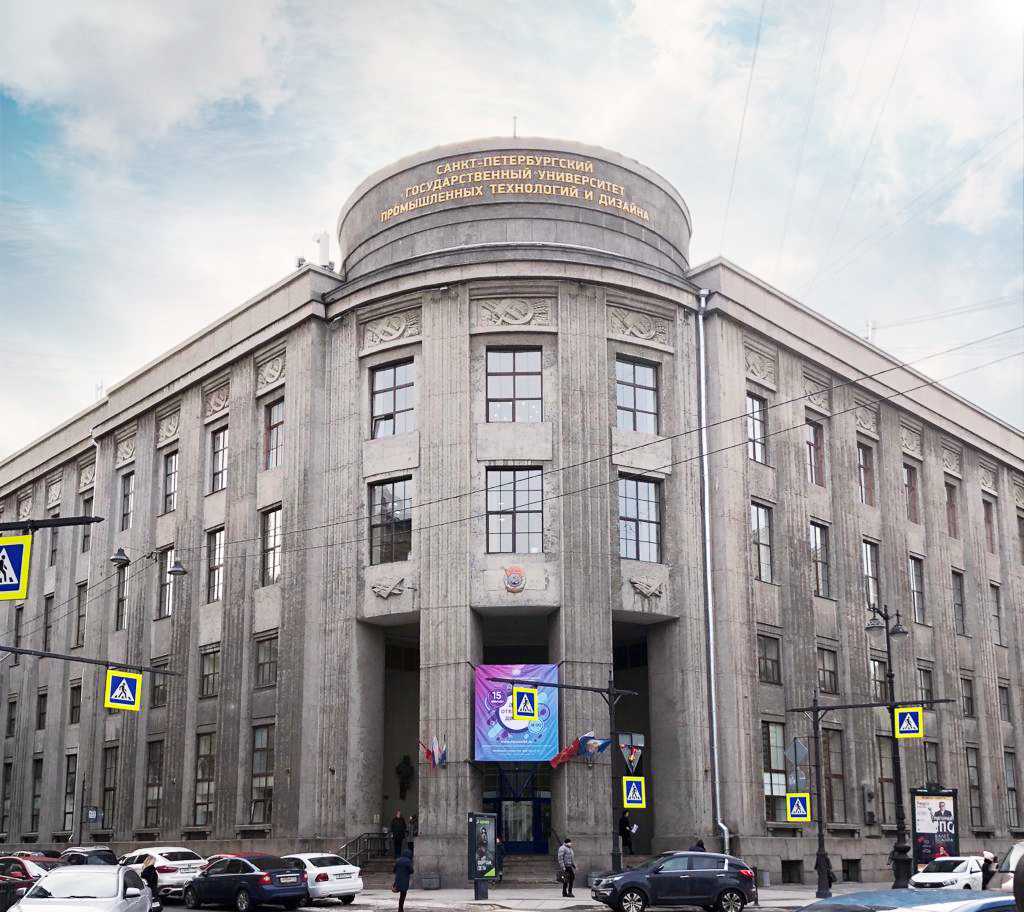
- Type: public
- Established: 1930
- Location: Saint Petersburg, Russia
- Campus: urban
- Language: Russian

Saint Petersburg State University of Industrial Technologies and Design (SUITD Russian: СПбГУПТД, Russian: Санкт-Петербургский государственный университет промышленных технологий и дизайна) is a public university located in Saint Petersburg, Russia. It was founded in 1930.

== Sanctions ==
Aleksey Vyacheslavovich Demidov (Демидов Алексей Вячеславович), the rector of the Saint Petersburg State University of Industrial Technologies and Design has signed a letter of support for the Russian invasion of Ukraine. The institution has sent UAZ Patriot cars to support war, and organized events during, which "dissemination of fake information about the actions of the Armed Forces of the Russian Federation, and the importance of maintaining civil consensus in the Russian Federation" were discussed in collaboration with Saint Petersburg Military Institute of the National Guard Forces

== History ==
Founded April 26, 1930 as the Leningrad Textile Institute, spun off from the Leningrad Institute of Technology. On November 6, 1930, the institute moved to its main educational and laboratory building located on Bolshaya Morskaya Street in Leningrad, where the first faculties - engineering and economic, technological - were established. In 1935, the first graduates graduated.

In the 1930s, it was called the Academy of Light Industry named after T. S. M. Kirov. The new building of the academy was erected in 1936. There were 5 departments in the academy: printing, textile and sewing, tannery and footwear, food and chemical.In 1940 the academy was liquidated and its functions and property were given to other educational institutions.

During the World War II students and teachers of the Institute were evacuated to Tashkent where on the basis of the Moscow, Leningrad and Tashkent institutes the united Textile Institute was created.The Special Chemical Laboratory established at the Institute since the beginning of the war and remaining in the city, together with the scientists of the Institute rendered assistance to the troops of the Leningrad Front and the defenders of Leningrad during the blockade.

In 1944 the Institute returned to Leningrad. In 1963, the Institute received a new name, the Kirov Leningrad Institute of Textile and Light Industry, due to the increase of its specialization.

In 1992 the institute was reorganized into St. Petersburg University of Technology and Design. In 2015 the St. Petersburg State Technological University of Plant Polymers (nowadays - the Higher School of Technology and Energy within the university) joined the university, which since that time began to be called as St. Petersburg State University of Industrial Technologies and Design.

St. Petersburg State University of Industrial Technologies and Design publishes scientific periodicals: "Herald of St. Petersburg State University of Technologies and Design" (since 1975); "Design. Materials. Technology" (since 2006); "Izvestiya vuzov. Technology of Light Industry" (since 2008) and youth editions: newspaper "TechStil" and student magazine "STIL-Student".

Now the university is a multidisciplinary educational complex, which includes 2 high schools, 18 institutes and 2 colleges, training specialists in 225 educational programs in design, engineering, humanities, economics and pedagogy.

== Structure ==
- Institute of Graphic Design
- Institute of Art and Design
- Institute of Costume Design
- Institute of Design of Spatial Environment
- Institute of Textile and Fashion
- Institute of Applied Art
- High School of Press and Media Technology
- Institute of Business Communication
- Institute of Economics and Social Technologies
- Northwestern Professional Pedagogical Institute
- Regional Institute for Continuing Vocational Education
- Institute of Information Technologies and Automation
- Institute of Applied Chemistry and Ecology
- Institute of Supplementary Professional Education
- Higher school of technology and power engineering
