= Galina Shatalova =

Russian neurosurgeon

Galina Sergeyevna Shatalova
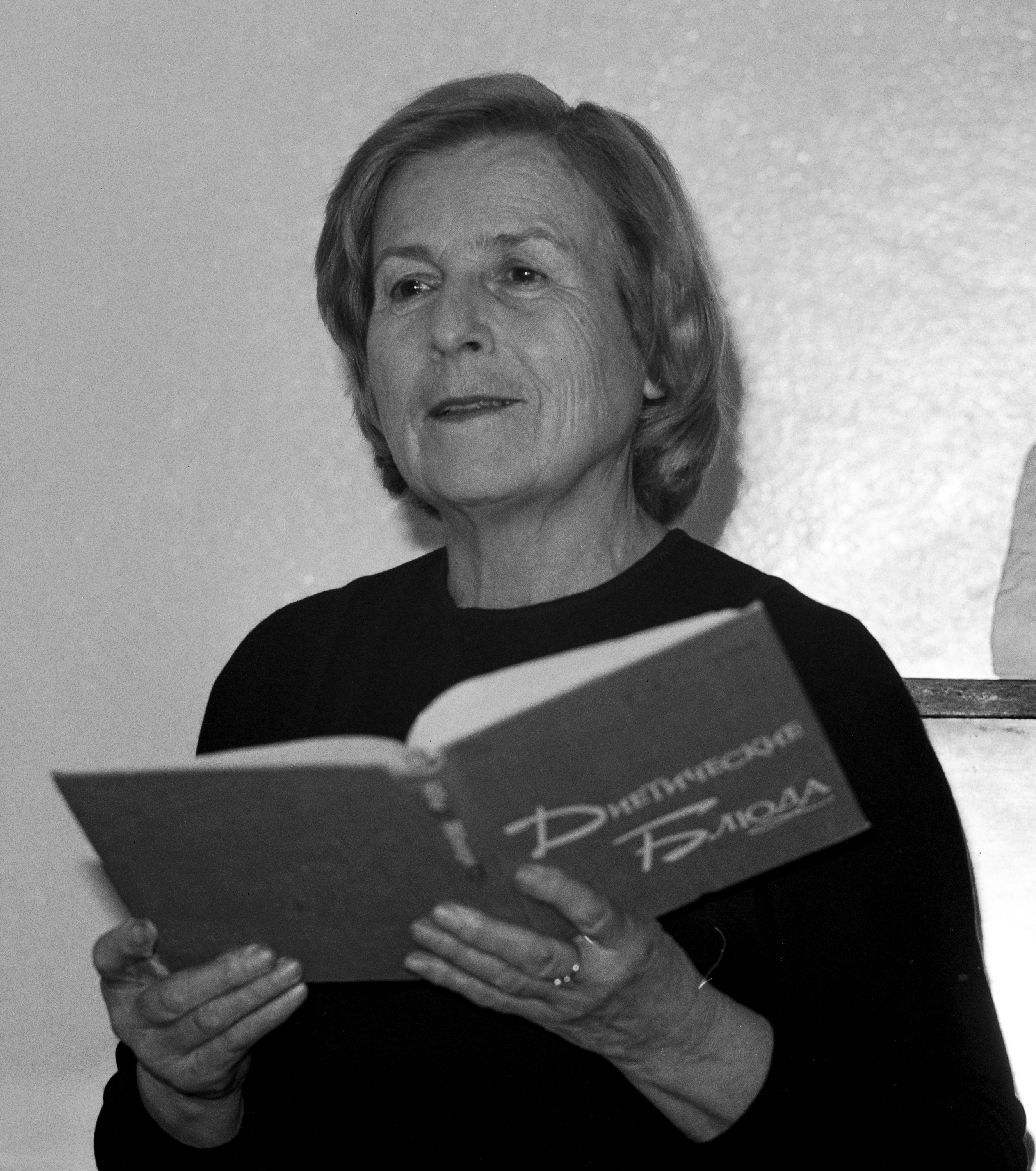
- Born: 13.10.1916; Ashgabat, Transcaspian Oblast
- Died: 14.12.2011; Moscow Oblast
- Education: Rostov Medical Institute
- Occupations: Neurosurgery, Dietetics
- Scientific career
- Thesis: "Replacement of defects in the dura mater with fibrin films"
- Academic advisors: Boris Yegorov

Galina Sergeyevna Shatalova (October 13, 1916, in Ashgabat, Transcaspian Oblast – December 14, 2011, in Moscow Oblast) was a Russian neurosurgeon, a military surgeon, the head of the cosmonaut selection and training department, and the laureate of the Burdenko Prize (1951).

== Biography ==
Shatalova was born on October 13, 1916. At the age of 15, she started her career. She entered the Rostov Medical Institute, graduated from it, and was left in the residency of the surgical clinic of the same institute.

In 1939, with the outbreak of hostilities on the Karelian Isthmus, she was drafted into the Army, where she became a military surgeon. She participated in the Second World War from the first to the last day, as a military surgeon, and head of the hospital department.

After the war, she worked as a neurosurgeon at the Central Institute of Neurosurgery of the USSR Academy of Sciences. "She directly met the needs of the post-war period: there were many such unfortunates (with) severe head wounds. Plasty of dura mater defects has prolonged the lives of thousands of veterans."

In the 60s, she worked at the Institute of Space Research of the USSR Academy of Sciences as the head of the cosmonaut selection and training sector.

She was the organizer and participant of successful extreme multi-day hiking trips in Karakum, Altai, Tien Shan, and Pamir. She was also a teacher of a healthy lifestyle, and author of the System of Natural Health.

== Works ==
She was the author of many books and a large number of publications including:

- "A System for all Systems." Soviet Life, Issues 1–6, pg.30-33, 1989.
- We eat ourselves to death: The revolutionary concept of a Russian Doctor for a long life with optimum health. Goldmann, 2002, ISBN 3-442-14222-9.
- Healing nutrition: An energetic food and herbology for true health. Goldmann, 2006, ISBN 3-442-21745-8.
- Philosophy of health. Goldmann, 2009, ISBN 978-3-442-21860-8.
- "Наука и Жизнь," Issue 12, 1979.

== Awards ==
- Medal "For Valiant Labour in the Great Patriotic War 1941–1945"

== Family life ==
Galina Shatalova was married to Major General and Professor Alexander Shatalov. She had three children.
