= Mikhail Fedoruk =

Russian mathematician (born 1956)

Mikhail Petrovich Fedoruk
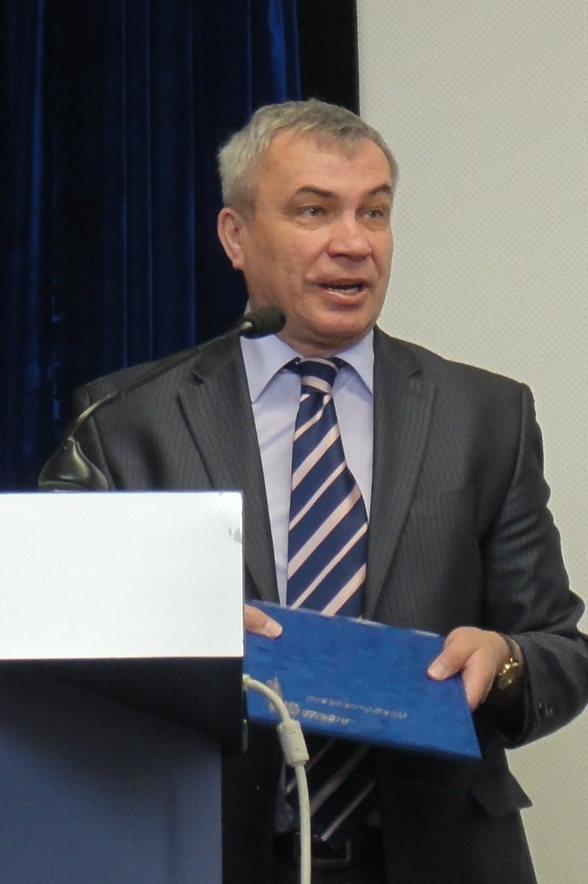
- Born: February 18, 1956; Kochenyovsky District, Novosibirsk Oblast, Russia
- Education: Novosibirsk State University
- Known for: Rector of Novosibirsk State University
- Scientific career
- Fields: Mathematics
- Workplaces: Novosibirsk State University; Institute of Theoretical and Applied Mechanics SB RAS

Mikhail Petrovich Fedoruk (Russian: Михаил Петрович Федорук) (born February 18, 1956) — is a rector of Novosibirsk State University, Doctor of Physics and Mathematics.

== Biography ==
Mikhail P. Fedoruk born February 18, 1956, in the Kochenyovsky District of Novosibirsk District, Russia.

In 1982 he graduated from the Faculty of Physics, Novosibirsk State University and began his scientific career with postgraduate study in the Institute of Theoretical and Applied Mechanics SB RAS. His teaching activities are connected with Novosibirsk State University. Since 1995 he worked as a lecturer at the Faculty of Mathematics and Mechanics, in 2003 became the first deputy dean of the faculty.

June 22, 2012 he was elected rector of NSU.

In 2022, he signed the Address of the Russian Union of Rectors, which called to support Putin in his invasion of Ukraine.

He is married and has a son.
