= Yekaterina Ankinovich =

Soviet geologist and mineralogist, discoverer of 12 minerals

Yekaterina Alexandrovna Ankinovich (1911-1991) was a Soviet geologist and mineralogist, Doctor of Sciences and professor. She discovered a record number of minerals - 12. She won the Lenin Prize and the Stalin Prize.

== Biography ==
=== Early life ===
Ankinovich was born in Little Yalchik (now Chuvashia).

=== Education ===
In 1937, she graduated from Leningrad Mining Institute (now Saint Petersburg Mining University). In 1964, she earned a Doctor of Sciences in Geology and Mineralogy.

=== Career ===
She worked in the geological service of Kazakhstan including in Alma-Ata and Karatau.

Ankinovich became a professor in 1967. She later became head of the department of "crystallography, mineralogy and petrography."

== Awards ==
- Stalin Prize Third Degree (USSR State Prize) 1948 for "geological research and development of the Nikolaevsky polymetal deposit"
- Medal "For Valiant Labour in the Great Patriotic War 1941–1945"
- Honored Scientist of the Kazakhstani SSR (1974)
- USSR Deposit Discoverer Medal
- Lenin Prize

== Honors ==
She has a mineral named after her - Ankinovichit.

== Family life ==
Her husband Stepan Gerasimovich Ankinovich was also a Soviet geologist.
