= Valentina Morozova =

Russian geologist and paleontologist

Valentina Galaktionovna Morozova (March 13, 1910 – December 28, 1989) was a Soviet geologist and paleontologist. Morozova's most recognizable works in her field revolve around her stratigraphical research on the sediments from the Paleozoic, Cretaceous, Mesozoic and Cenozoic eras.

== Early life ==
Valentina Galaktionovna Morozova was born March 13, 1910, in Saint Petersburg, Russian Empire. Both of her parents worked; her father as a railway engineer, and her mother working in the textile industry. At a young age, Valentina was accepted to the Ledovskaya Gymnasium in Leningrad, otherwise known as school no. 190, It was here, at age 15, where her interest in philosophy, religious experience, and psychology were sparked.

While still attending school, Valentina, along with several of her classmates, had joined a political activism group. This group served against the views of the Russian government, which led to their temporary arrest in 1928. Although she only served six months in preventive detention, she was forced to face consequences after being released on probation. She would be charged with subversive activities, prohibited from traveling to seven different cities in Russia, and her conviction would later be exposed in 1950 by the Ministry of State Security. The conviction would be annulled two years later in 1952.

== Education ==
Morozova originally wanted to attend art or medical school, but government complications at the time restricted her choices. As she was the child of an intellectual, she was unable to gain acceptance to her schools of choice, and instead attended Leningrad University, deciding to study geomorphology. Valentina graduated in 1933 and would continue her education with a graduate course at Moscow University four years later.

== Personal life ==
In the early 1940s, Morozona lost her father and 20-year-old brother in the siege of Leningrad. She divorced in 1943 and from that relationship she had a single daughter. Later on in her life, Morozova would gain two grandchildren who she treated with kindness. She was known for being a charitable and kind person to her family and friends.

== Career and contributions ==
Valentina Galaktionovna Morozova began her scientific career working as a paleontologist at the Laboratory of the All-Union Research Institute of Geological Prospecting. In 1937, at Moscow University, Morozova completed her post-graduate degree and successfully defended her thesis on the turnover of foraminifera found at the Cretaceous/Tertiary boundary. Upon completion of her graduate degree, Morozova joined the Moscow Society of Natural Historians in 1938. Following this, she would go on to work under the Volga-Bashkiria Expedition. During the expedition, she spent most of her time on stratigraphy research between 1941 and 1943. The majority of the expedition occurred in Bashkiria Cisurals, with its purpose being to study Paleozoic sediments. Her work in these years lead to the USSR awarding her the Medal "For Valiant Labour in the Great Patriotic War 1941–1945".

Her work would further include the dating of horizons and addressing Paleozoic correlation. She covered vast areas of the USSR such as the Emba River, Crimea, the East European Russian Platform, the Caucasus Mountains, Mangyshlak, Krasnovodsk, Kopet Dag Mountain Range, and the Talysh Mountains. These expeditions lead to many dangerous situations, such as encounters with Ukrainian Nationalists and injuries from falling.

At the Geological Institute of USSR Academy of Sciences, Valentina Morozova continued with her studies on Mesozoic and Cenozoic stratigraphy in southern Russia. Valentina worked with the USSR for 22 years. However, the Ministry of State Security eventually reminded Morozova of her conviction in 1950. As a result, in 1952 the KGB demanded that she work as an informant on her colleagues, to which she ultimately refused. Morozova succumbed to illness after KGB interrogation, which eventually deterred the Ministry from further pursuing Morozova as a threat due to her inability to fully recover. Valentina Morozova's work was publicized in the USSR.

Although at the time it was uncommon for women to be in the field of science in Russia, she was greatly respected. Her wide influence was positioned in the fields of paleontology and geology. Morozova's research also included such fields as biostratigraphy, paleoecology, and micropaleontology. Her research on the stratigraphy of Tertiary and Cretaceous sediments were presented at Society conferences and at meetings of the Paleogene Commission.

As the chairperson of a group at the All-Union Coordination Commission on Micropaleontology of the USSR Academy of Sciences, her work became influential throughout the USSR, continuing into post-Soviet countries and internationally. The genus Morozovella and the Eocene Zone M. morozovi were named after her due to contributions to micropaleontology.

Many believe that her work was ahead of its time due to the research and theories that she presented. For example, In 1960, around 20 years before the first recognized usage of this concept, she published on the topic of analyzing ecosystems for biostratigraphic research. Another example occurred in 1966, when she presented the idea that cosmic factors influenced foraminiferal evolution. While at the time many did not support this, it is a theory that is well accepted today.

Some theorize that due to illness and censorship some of her work remains unseen, unpublished, or even unwritten entirely, though it is unknown to what extent.

The Journal Article Lower Scythia in the Western European Geographical Traditional at the Time of the Crusades was written in memory of Morozova due to her essential contributions to stratigraphical research in Europe.

== Death ==
At the age of 79, Valentina Morozova died on December 28, 1989, in Moscow. She was laid to rest in Serafimov cemetery in Leningrad.
