= Pavel Ipatov (economist) =

Russian economist

- Born: July 12, 1914; Zlynka, Chernigov Governorate, Russian Empire
- Died: May 8, 1994 (aged 79); Moscow, USSR
- Occupation: economist
- Known for: vice-rector of the Moscow Institute of Finance (1957–1985)

Pavel Fyodorovich Ipatov (Russian: Павел Фёдорович Ипатов; 1914–1994) was a Russian economist and financial scientist, the vice-rector of the Moscow Institute of Finance (1957–1985), PhD in economics, professor.

== Biography ==
Ipatov was born in Chernigov Governorate in 1914 into a worker's family. After losing his parents early in his childhood, Pavel was brought up in the family of an older brother in Schelkovo, Moscow Oblast

From 1930 to 1933, he studied at the Power Engineering College. After graduation he worked as an electrician in a felt factory. In 1936, he was drafted into the Red Army and served as a Red Army man in the artillery regiment of the 1st Moscow Proletariat Red Banner Rifle Division. from 1937 to 1938, after demobilization, he continued to work at the same factory. from 1938 to 1939, he became the head of the Komsomol town committee in Schelkovo. from 1940 to 1941, he was a student at the All-Union Financial Academy (later on, Finance and Economic Institute) in Leningrad.

In August 1941, he voluntarily went to the front of World War II. He took part in the battles on Southern, Don and 2nd Belorussian fronts, participated in the Battle of Stalingrad.

Demobilized again, he studied from 1946 to 1949 at the Moscow Finance Institute (now Financial University under the Government of the Russian Federation), which he graduated from, with honors. There is a book named “People of Russian Science” in the Museum of the History of the Financial University – stored as a gift to the graduate Ipatov with an inscription at the top of the title page made by Nikolai Rovinsky, the director of the Institute: “To comrade Ipatov for his excellent study and notable public activities at the Institute, 12.3.1949”. Upon graduation, he had been accepted to the Institute's graduate school. In 1954, Ipatov became PhD in economics. He served at the Department of Finance as a senior lecturer, then as an assistant professor (since 1958) and a professor (since 1972).

From 1957 to 1985, Pavel Ipatov served as Vice-Rector for Academic Affairs at the Moscow Finance Institute. For several years, he chaired the Council for the award of scientific degrees and supervised graduate students as well as conducted research work.

Ipatov was the author of over 20 scientific works on the finances of the USSR and the state budget.

He died in Moscow in 1994.

== Honors and awards ==
- Order of the Patriotic War, 2nd class
- Order of the Red Star
- Order of the Badge of Honour
- Medal "For the Victory over Germany in the Great Patriotic War 1941–1945"
- Medal "For Courage"
