= Kuban State Technological University =

Russian public technical university in Krasnodar

Coordinates: 45°02′55″N 39°00′09″E

- Type: State
- Established: 16 June 1918
- Endowment: RUB 25.9 billion
- President: Vladimir Grigoryevich Lobanov
- Rector: Igor Aleksandrovich Lagerev (Acting Rector)
- Administrative staff: 1,300
- Undergraduates: 16,000
- Postgraduates: 800
- Location: Krasnodar, Kuban, Russia
- Campus: Urban, 380 acres (1.5 km^{2})
- Athletics: 43 varsity teams
- Website: http://kubstu.ru/

Kuban State Technological University (Russian: Кубанский государственный технологический университет), also referred to as the Kuban State University of Technology, is a Russian public technical university located in Krasnodar, one of the first higher educational institutions established in the southern region of Russia.

== History ==
The first institution of higher education in the Kuban region, Kuban Polytechnic Institute (called North-Caucasian Polytechnic Institute in 1918-1919) was founded in Yekaterinodar on 16 June 1918. Professor Boris Lvovich Rosing, a physicist, the inventor of the electronic television, was one of the founders of the Institute.

In 1923, Kuban Polytechnic Institute was formally abolished, but its staff and property were transferred to Kuban Agricultural Institute (formed in 1922 from the Faculty of Agronomy of the Polytechnic), where the development of higher technical education in Krasnodar was continued. Though it was a very difficult and unstable period in the history of Russia, the professors and lecturers made every effort to improve both the quality of education and research activities prompted by the needs of local food and beverage industries. This led to the development of two disciplines of food science such as fats-and-oil and wine-making technology. In 1938, after a series of preceding divisions and transformations the Agricultural Institute had been subjected to, the Chemical Technological Institute of Fat Industry and the Institute of Winemaking and Viticulture were established in Krasnodar. In 1943, these institutes were merged into the Krasnodar Institute of Food Technology.

In 1963, the Krasnodar Institute of Food Technology was re-structured into Krasnodar Polytechnic Institute. On 11 April 1980, the institute was awarded the Order of the Red Banner of Labour.

In November 1993, it obtained the status of a university, and as a result it was renamed Kuban State Technological University (KubSTU). On 6 November 2015, KubSTU was awarded the Prize of the Government of the Russian Federation in the area of quality.

Lobanov Vladimir (Лобанов Владимир Григорьевич), the rector of the Kuban State Technological University has signed a letter of support for the Russian invasion of Ukraine.

== Present day ==
Nowadays KubSTU employs over 1200 full-time faculty, including professors and lecturers. The university enrolls over 16,000 undergraduate and about 800 postgraduate students.

As of 2022, the university incorporated 7 institutes (the Institute of Computer Systems and Information Security, the Institute of Construction and Transport Infrastructure, the Institute of Economics, Management and Business, the Institute of Food and Processing Industry, the Institute of Fundamental Sciences, the Institute of Mechanics, Robotics, Engineering of Transport and Technical Systems, and the Institute of Oil, Gas and Power Engineering), and the further education college of engineering and technology. Other university subdivisions include the KubSTU — Schneider-Electric training center, the center of high education, the Russian Minobrnauka regional center of testing, 6 research-training centers, 6 centres of high-tech equipment for collective use, 6 small-scale innovative enterprises, 4 student design offices, a student innovative business incubator, and 450 specialized laboratories. KubSTU also has branches in Novorossiysk and Armavir.

The university offers continuous multi-stage program, and trains students ranging from just post secondary level to undergraduate to graduate to the scientific level of PhD and DSc.

Classes are held in 11 buildings. At the area of 131 thousand m^{2} there are 50 academic departments, 115 lecture-rooms, 381 specialized laboratories and workshops, 60 computer classes. Special subjects are studied at 58 Department branches established at industrial enterprises of the Krasnodar City and Territory. In three buildings for studies there are developed local computer networks used for teaching students, about 150 workstations have access to Internet.

=== University library ===
The university library has a stock of scientific, teaching and fiction literature – both domestic and international, over 1 million of volumes in number. The readers can work with literature in 9 reading halls and get books they need at 5 library departments. There is a local network and access to the Internet at the library.

=== State attestation and accreditation ===
KubSTU has passed the state attestation and accreditation. According to the license KubSTU has the right to train specialists in 66 specialities, on 20 bachelor's degree programs and one master's degree program, to prepare postgraduate students for the PhD in 51 fields of science and for Doctor's degree in 9 fields of science. The university offers also programs of pre-university training and optional programs.

=== Chancellor ===
The acting rector of the university is Doctor of Technical Sciences, Professor Igor Aleksandrovich Lagerev. The president of the university is Doctor of Technical Sciences, Professor Vladimir Grigoryevich Lobanov.
