= France Universités =

French organisation

Logo

France Universités (French pronunciation: [fʁɑ̃s ynivɛʁsite]), until 2022 the Conférence des Présidents d'Université (CPU), is an organisation of university presidents in France.

== Overview ==
The Conférence des Présidents d'Université was created in 1971. Its meetings are not open to the public. On 30 January 2025, Lamri Adoui, president of the University of Caen Normandy, was appointed president of France Universités.
