= Marina Borovskaya =

Russian scientist

Marina Aleksandrovna Borovskaya
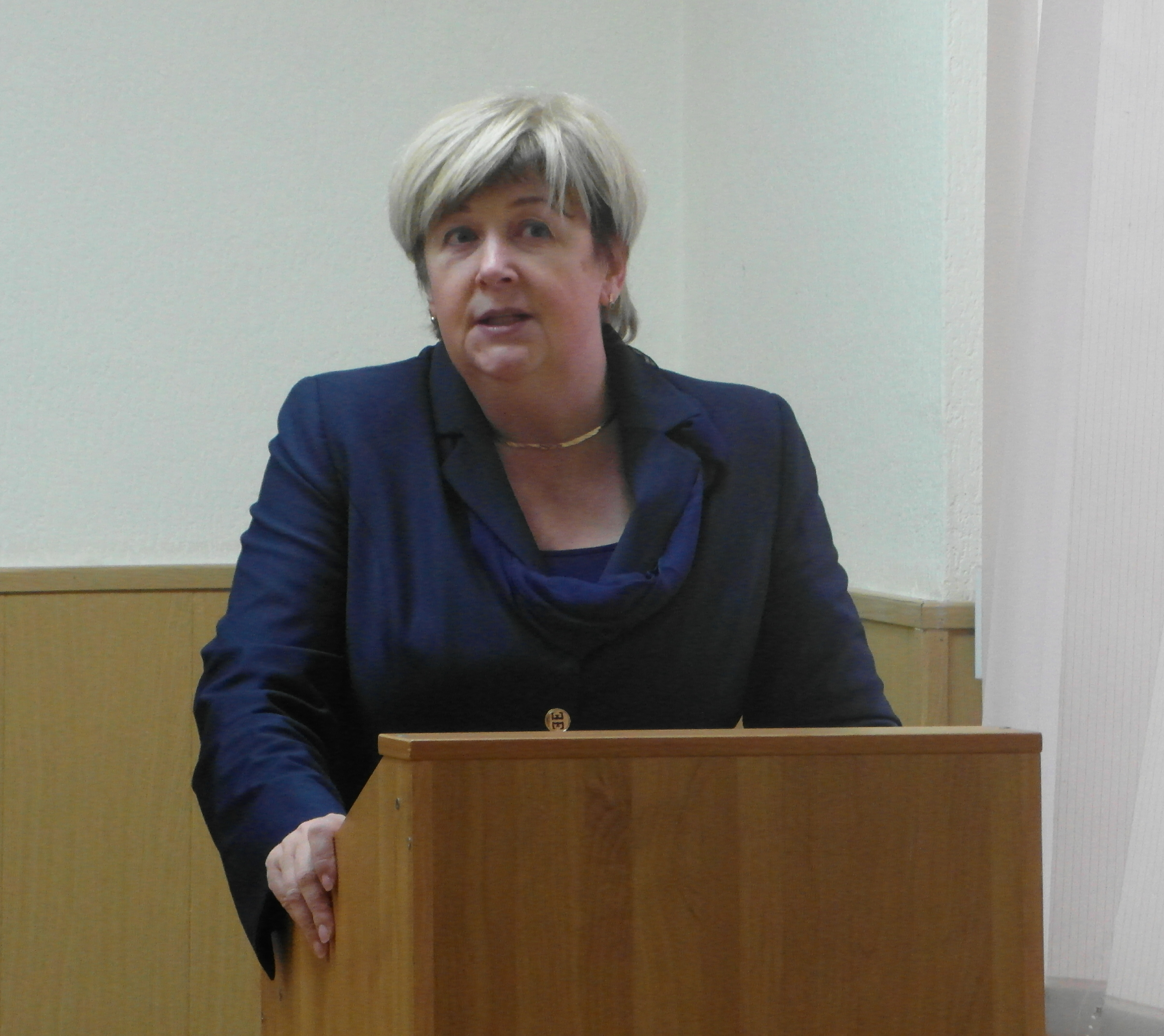
- Born: Marina Aleksandrovna Borovskaya; Марина Александровна Боровская; October 8, 1964 (age 61); Sverdlovsk
- Occupation: economist

Marina Aleksandrovna Borovskaya (Russian: Марина Александровна Боровская; born 8 October 1964) is a Russian economist and professor. She serves as Rector of Southern Federal University since 2012. She is the President of the Council of Rectors of Southern Federal District, Vice-President of Russian Union of Rectors.

== Early life ==
Marina Aleksandrovna Borovskaya was born on 8 October 8, 1964 in Sverdlovsk (now Ekaterinburg).

In 1986 she graduated from the Economics Faculty of Rostov State University (specialty "political economy").

In 1989 she enrolled in postgraduate study at Rostov State University. In September 1991 she began working at Taganrog State Radio Engineering University as an Assistant at the Department of Economics.

In 1994 she began working as a senior specialist of the credit department in Promstroybank in Rostov-on-Don. In 1996, she moved to work for the insurance company Soyuz, where she held the position of Chief financial specialist.

In 1997, she defended her candidate, and in 2002 — her doctoral thesis (topic — "Management of municipal property in the system of regional economy: a theoretical and an applied aspect". From 2003 to 2007, she was in charge of the Department of Economics of Taganrog State Radio Engineering University. From 2007 to 2010 she worked as Deputy Rector.

In 2010, she moved to work at the Ministry of Education and Science of Russia, where, until 2012, she held the post of Deputy Director of the Department for Organization of the Budget Process, Accounting and Reporting.

On 18 June 18, 2012 by the decree of Prime Minister of Russia Dmitry Medvedev Marina Borovskaya was appointed the Rector of Southern Federal University.

In 2016 she was elected a Corresponding Member of the Russian Academy of Education.

== Controversy ==
The volunteer community network Dissernet has uncovered several cases of Borovskaya's participation in awarding scientific degrees based on heavily plagiarized theses, including a student who plagiarized Borovskaya's own thesis and who she was supervising at the time.
