= Lipatov =

Lipatov (Russian: Липатов) is a Russian masculine surname originating from the given name Ipat, its feminine counterpart is Lipatova. It may refer to

- Alexander Lipatov (born 1981), Russian slalom canoeist
- Lev Lipatov (1940–2017), Russian physicist
- Svetlana Lipatova (born 1993), Russian wrestler
