= Nikolai Rovinsky =

Russian economist and financial scientist (1887–1953)

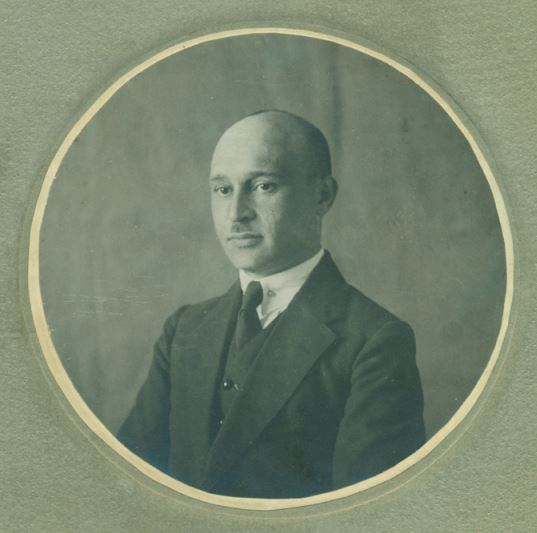

Rector of the Moscow Institute of Finance
- In office 1946–1953

Personal details
- Born: January 16, 1887; Smolensk, Russian Empire
- Died: June 22, 1953 (aged 66); Moscow, USSR
- Occupation: economist

Nikolai Nikolaevich Rovinsky (1887–1953) was a Russian economist and financial scientist, the first rector (director) of the Moscow Institute of Finance, PhD in economics, professor.

== Early life and education ==
Rovinsky was born in Smolensk in 1887. After losing his father early in his childhood, he studied at the Smolensk men's classical gymnasium and from the fifth grade he kept himself on his own, earning money by lessons. After graduating from the gymnasium with honors, Nikolai entered the Economic Department at the Peter the Great St. Petersburg Polytechnic University. In 1911, he received a PhD in economics.

== Career ==
During the World War I, from August 1914 to December 1917, he was in military service. After discharge until 1923 he worked at the Smolensk Polytechnic Institute, then, from 1923 to 1929, served as Rector of Smolensk State University.

In 1929, Rovinsky was invited to Moscow to work as an Adviser to the Council of People's Commissars on financial and economic issues. At the same time, he continued his research in finance and economics, working as part-time Director of the Scientific and Research Financial Institute of the People's Commissariat of Finance of the USSR (until 1941). In 1940, he became full Ph.D. in Economics.

In 1944, he published The State Budget of the USSR monograph, an applied course consisted of two independent disciplines: State Revenues and Budget Planning and Financing.

Rovinsky was the author of over 20 textbooks and teaching aids.

In 1946, when the Moscow Financial and Economic Institute and the Moscow Credit and Economic Institute were merged into one (the Moscow Institute of Finance), Nikolai Nikolayevich Rovinsky became Rector of it and headed the University until his death in 1953.

== Honors and awards ==
- Honored Scientist of the Russian Soviet Federative Socialist Republic (1944)
- Order of the Badge of Honour (1944)

Academic offices
New office	Rector of the Financial University under the Government of the Russian Federation; 1946–1953	Succeeded by Vladimir Shcherbakov (1953–1985)
