= Stanislav Prokofiev =

Russian economist

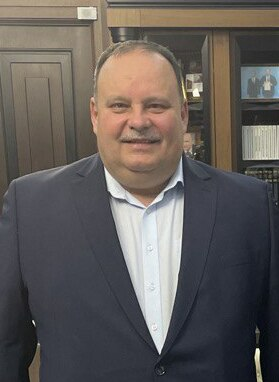

Rector of the Financial University under the Government of the Russian Federation
- Incumbent
- Assumed office 2021

Personal details
- Born: February 28, 1968 (age 57); Saratov, Soviet Union
- Occupation: economist

Stanislav Evgenievich Prokofiev (Russian: Станислав Евгеньевич Прокофьев, born 28 February 1968, Saratov, Soviet Union) is a Russian economist.

In 2021, he became rector of Financial University under the Government of the Russian Federation.

== International sanctions ==
Following the 2022 Russian invasion of Ukraine, the government of Ukraine has introduced sanctions against Prokofiev as well as against the Financial University, and its president Mikhail Eskindarov. In March that year, Prokofiev and Eskindarov had signed an open letter of Russian university rectors supporting the invasion.

The sanctions include an indefinite termination of any cultural exchange, scientific cooperation, educational and sports contacts, entertainment programs of Ukrainian entities and persons with the Financial University as well as a visa ban and asset freeze for Prokofiev and Eskindarov.

Academic offices
Preceded by Mikhail Eskindarov (2006–2021)	Rector of the Financial University under the Government of the Russian Federation; 2021–present	Succeeded by Incumbent
