= Sergei Shlyk =

Sergei Vladimirovich Shlyk
- Born: Sergei Vladimirovich Shlyk; Сергей Владимирович Шлык; 1966 (age 59–60); Rostov-on-Don
- Occupation: cardiologist

Sergei Vladimirovich Shlyk (Russian: Сергей Владимирович Шлык; 1966, Rostov-on-Don) is a Russian cardiologist, Doctor of Medical Sciences, Professor. Rector of Rostov State Medical University since 2012.

== Biography ==
Sergey Vladimirovich Shlyk was born in Rostov-on-Don in 1966. In 1989 he graduated from the Faculty of Medical Prevention of Rostov Medical Institute. In 2005 he also graduated from the Faculty of Law of the North Caucasus Academy of Public Service.

In 1989—2008 he was intern, graduate student, assistant, associate professor and professor of the Department of Internal Medicine. Since 2008 he was the Head of the Department of Therapy of the Faculty of Advanced Studies and Professional Retraining of Rostov State Medical University.

In 1992 he defended his candidate thesis on the topic "Functional interrelations of hemodynamics, the exchange of forms of water and oxygen transport in the blood in patients with various clinical course of myocardial infarction", and in 1999 — his doctoral thesis on "Clinico-pathogenetic significance of changes in oxygen transport, oxidative metabolism and water metabolism during heart failure".

From 2001 to 2012 he worked as Deputy Minister of Health of Rostov Oblast. From 2009 to 2012 he was the chief cardiologist of the Rostov Oblast, and from 2014 to the present day he is the chief cardiologist of the Southern Federal District. Since 28 November 2012 he was appointed acting Rector of Rostov State Medical University. On 29 October 2013 at the University Conference he was elected Rector of the Rostov State Medical University.

His main scientific works are dedicated to therapy, cardiology, epidemiology, medical and economic analysis.

Sergei Shlyk is a member of the European Society of Cardiology.
