= Nikolay Morozkin =

Russian mathematician

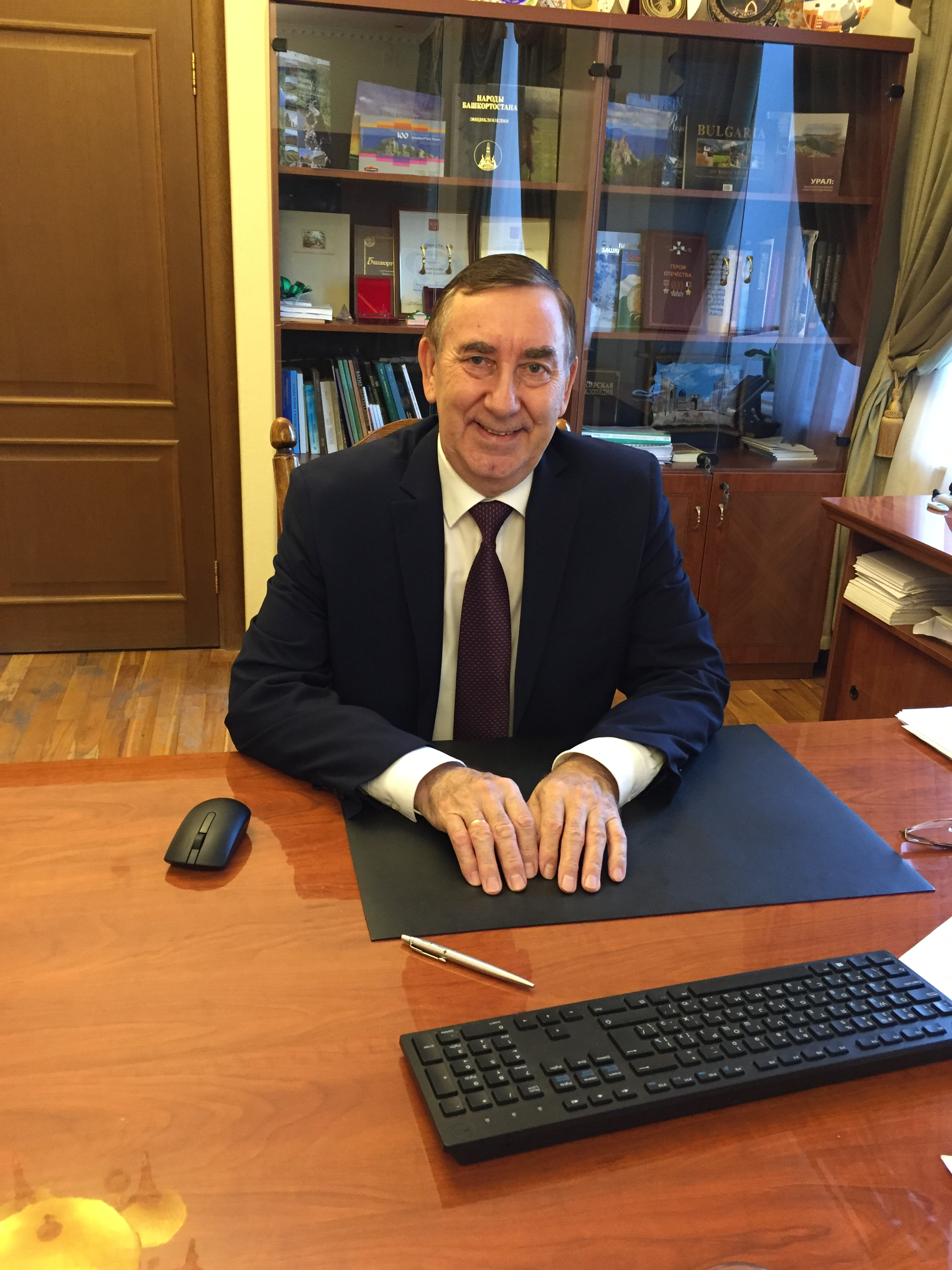
- Born: 27 November 1953 (age 72); Kirgemany, USSR
- Education: Mordovian State University, Leningrad State University
- Known for: mathematics
- Scientific career
- Fields: Mathematics
- Workplaces: Bashkir State University

Nikolai Danilovich Morozkin (Russian: Николай Данилович Морозкин; born 27 November 1953) is a Soviet and Russian mathematician. Doctor of Physical and Mathematical Sciences (1996), Professor (1997), Rector of Bashkir State University (since 2013), Honorary Figure of Higher Education of the Russian Federation (2011).

== Life ==
Nikolai Morozkin graduated from Mordovia State University in 1975. In 1980 he finished his postgraduate studies at the Faculty of Applied Mathematics in Leningrad State University. In 1980–1983 he worked as a senior lecturer for the Department of Differential Equations in Mordovia State University.

In 1983 he started to teach at Bashkir State University, first as a senior lecturer, docent. In 1993 he became the Head of the Department of Applied Informatics and Numerical Methods, and since 1997 he simultaneously worked as a vice-rector for academic affairs.

On May 16, 2021, Nikolai Morozkin was elected Rector of Bashkir State University. In October 2017, he was elected again for the next period. Nikolai Morozkin is a member of The Board of Trustees of Bashkir Regional Branch of The Russian Geographical Society.

== Research ==
In 1980, he defended his Candidate's dissertation; in 1996 – his Doctorate dissertation. In 1997, he became a professor.

Areas of research:

- Mathematical Modelling,
- Informatics,
- Control Optimization,
- Numerical Methods Development.

Nikolai Morozkin created problem-solving procedures for speed-in-action problems with non-linear convex phase constraints and for heat optimizations problems accounting for various technological constraints and strength properties of heated objects. He conducted research in mathematical modeling and calculation of pressure field in medical and biological systems, for example, in в temporomandibular joint.

Nikolai Morozkin is a member of Doctorate Dissertation Defence Boards for the following specialties: thermophysics and thermology; fluid, gas, and plasma mechanics. He is an author of about 100 scientific papers, 2 utility patents.

== Selected works ==
=== In Russian ===
- О сходимости конечномерных приближений в задаче оптимального одномерного нагрева с учетом фазовых ограничений // Журнал вычислительной математики и математической физики. — 1996. — No. 10. — С. 12–22.
- Об одном итерационном методе решения задачи оптимального нелинейного нагрева с фазовыми ограничениями // Журнал вычислительной математики и математической физики. — 2000. — Т. 40, No. 11. — С. 1615—1632 (соавторы Голичев И. И., Дульцев А. В.).
- Оптимальное управление одномерным нагревом с учетом фазовых ограничений // Математическое моделирование. — 1996. — Т. 8, No. 3. — С. 91–110.
- Оптимальное управление процессами нагрева с учетом фазовых ограничений: Учебное пособие. — Уфа: изд-во БашГУ, 1997. — 114 с.
- Оптимизация высокотемпературного индукционного нагрева сплошного цилиндра с учетом ограничений на термонапряжения // Электричество. — 1995. — No. 5. — С. 56–60.
- Применение метода конечных элементов для расчета пластового давления в нефтяном месторождении // Нефтяное хозяйство. — 1998. — No. 11. — С. 28—30 (соавтор Бикбулатова Г. С.).
- Расчет поля напряжений нижнечелюстного сустава // Математическое моделирование. — 2008. — Т. 20, No. 6. — С. 119–128. (соавтор Колонских Д. М.).

=== In English ===
- The Convergence of Finite — Dimensional Approximations in the Problem of the Optimal One — Dimensional Heating Taking Phase Constraints into Account // Comp. Math. Phys. — 1996. — Vol. 36, N 10. — P. 1331–1339.

== Titles and awards ==
- Honored Worker of Higher Education of the Russian Federation (2002)
- Honored Worker of Science of the Republic of Bashkortostan (2004)
- Honorary Figure of Russian Higher Education
