= Anatoly Alexandrov (engineer) =

Soviet and Russian scientist (born 1951)

- Анатолий Александров
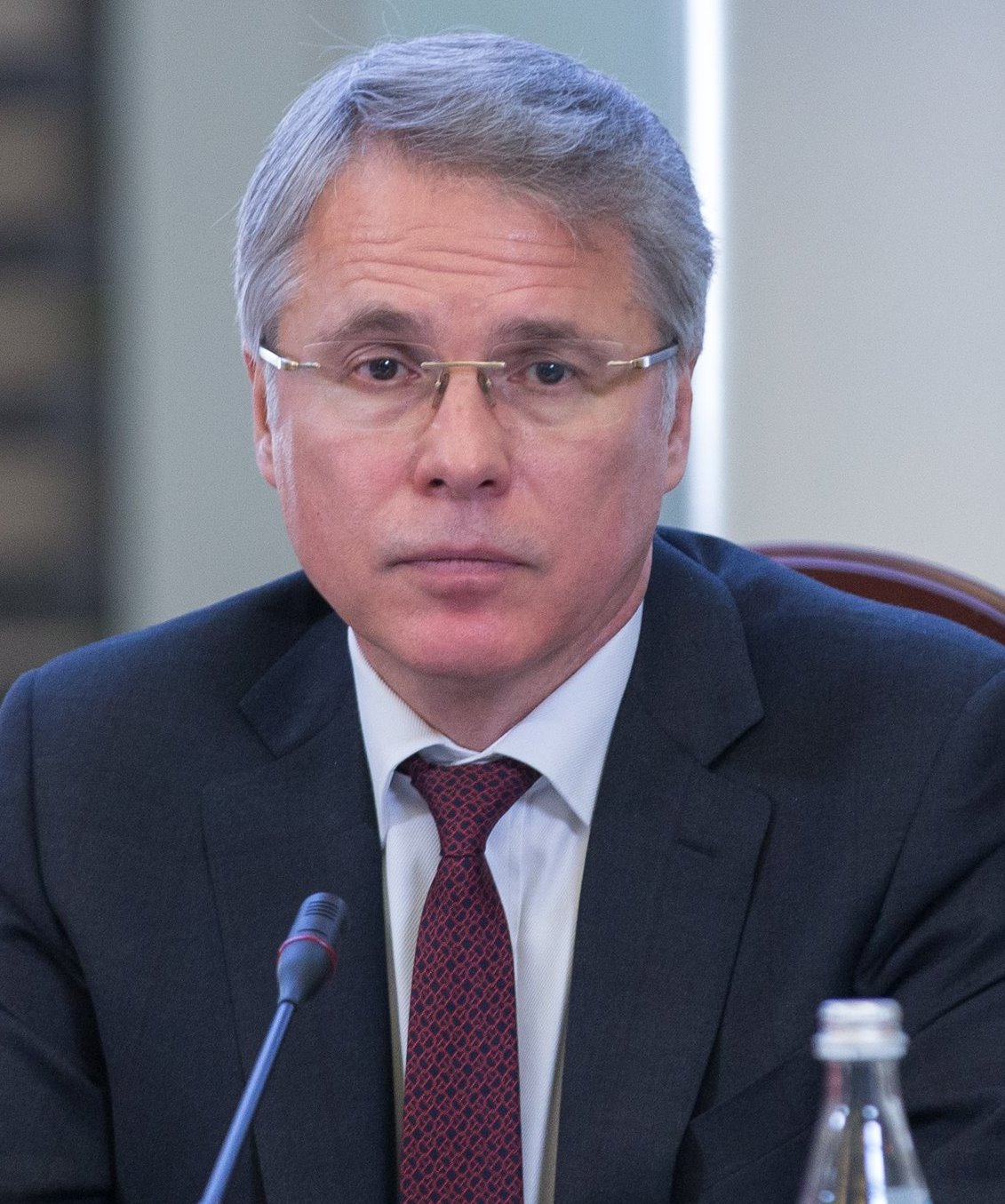
- Alexandrov in 2016
- Born: Anatoly Alexandrovich Alexandrov; 7 April 1951 (age 75); Iziaslav, Ukrainian SSR, Soviet Union
- Education: Bauman Moscow State Technical University
- Scientific career
- Fields: Applied physics
- Workplaces: Bauman Moscow State Technical University
- Doctoral advisor: Doctor of Technical Sciences (2006)

Anatoly Alexandrovich Alexandrov (Russian: Анато́лий Алекса́ндрович Алекса́ндров; born 7 April 1951), D.N., is a Russian applied physicist and a design engineer who is the rector of the Bauman Moscow State Technical University.

== Biography ==
Anatoly Alexandrov graduated from Bauman Moscow State Technical University (MSTU) in 1975. Several years after graduation he worked at MSTU as an engineer. In 1982 was promoted to Design Engineer, then Head of Logistics, then to the position of deputy director of Development and Studies, and later the Chief Engineer of the MSTU Experimental Plant.

Shortly after starting the postgraduate studies (in 1984), he switched to the Komsomol career and did not complete his Candidate of Sciences thesis.

In 1991, he was appointed as the Director of MSTU Experimental Plant. Since 2010 he became a member of the Skolkovo Foundation Council.

In 2004, he was awarded Candidate of Sciences degree, and two years later — a Doktor nauk degree.

In 2010, Anatoly Alexandrov was elected a Rector of MSTU.

In 2022, he signed the Address of the Russian Union of Rectors, which called to support Putin in his invasion of Ukraine.

== Accusations of academic fraud ==
The analysis of Doctor Nauk thesis of Anatoly Alexandrov performed by Dissernet has demonstrated the presence of plagiarism and other forms of academic fraud.
