= Rostov State Medical University =

Public university in Rostov-on-Don, Rostov Oblast, Russia

- Ростовский Государственный Медицинский Университет
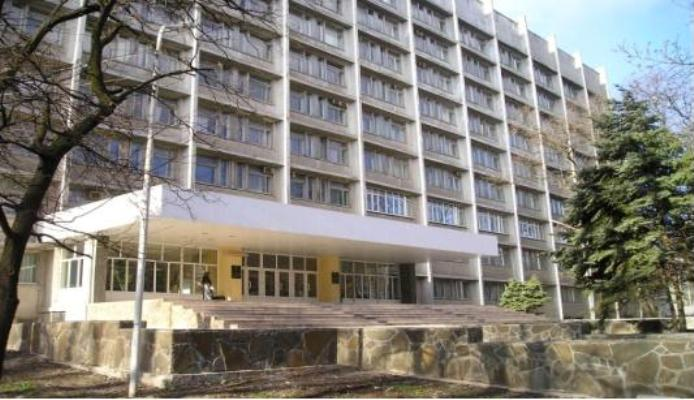
- Motto: «Время учиться быть профессионалом» "Its a Time to be a Professional"
- Type: Government University
- Established: 1918
- Rector: Sergei Vladimirovich Shlyk
- Faculty: 800
- Students: Totally 7000 (Russian and foreign)
- Postgraduates: 650
- Location: Rostov-on-Don, Russia; 47.2290°N 39.7400°E

Rostov State Medical University (Ростовский Государственный Медицинский Университет in Russian) is a Russian public university of higher professional education of The Ministry of Health and Social Medicine. Rostov State Medical University is also known as Rostov State Medical Institute, RostSMU, RostGMU, Rostov State Government Medical University.

== History ==
In 1915, the Division of Medicine at the Russian Warsaw University was moved to Rostov-on-Don, and that gave rise to the present-day Rostov State Medical University. It was initially formed as a department and later transformed into a medical institute in 1930. In 1994, the Rostov Medical Institute, at the time the largest basic training, research, and treatment center in southern Russia, was renamed the Rostov Medical University.

== Description ==
The college trains 5000–7000 students annually for the Doctor of Medicine program. Each year, more than 650 people are trained in internships, residency, and graduate school.

The university has 91 departments, which employ over 800 people as teaching staff, of whom more than 130 are doctors, professors, and about 500 candidates. The university is engaged in research and clinical activities and has 31 academicians who are corresponding members of the Russian Academy of Medical Sciences.

== Science and activities ==
Scientific activities increased and coordinated through the research of implemented and on faculties and courses. The University is functioning effectively in the central research laboratory (CSRL), conducting a wide range of biochemical, molecular genetic, morphological, microbiological studies. State educational institution of higher education "Rostov State Medical University, Federal Agency for Health and Social Development" promotes international scientific cooperation with Britain, the US, Germany, France, Bulgaria, Ukraine, Armenia, Moldova, and other foreign countries by exchanging researchers and students, teachers, qualified specialists, taking part in international scientific conferences, congresses.

== Clinics and faculties ==
Medical University Clinic

The clinic has 860 beds at the hospital, including 20 specialized departments, 18 medical-diagnostic units, 17 clinical departments, whose employees carry significant medical, counseling, and teaching work.

Rostov State Medical University

- Preparation of domestic and foreign nationals in the field:

- Faculty of General Medicine;
- Faculty of Dentistry;
- Faculty of Pediatrics;
- Faculty of Pharmacy;
- Faculty of Medico-prophylactics;
- Faculty of Postgraduate and Continuous Education;
- Faculty of Armed Force Medicine;
- Preparatory Faculty;

The University has collaborated with the World Federation for Medical Education, the World Health Organization, UNESCO, the British Council, the United States Agency for International Development, the American International Health Alliance, and participating in a range of joint international research projects.

== Notable alumni ==
- Galina Shatalova - neurosurgeon, military surgeon, head of the cosmonaut selection and training department, laureate of the Burdenko Prize (1951).
