= Finance University under the Government of the Russian Federation =

University in Moscow, Russia

Finance University under the Government of the Russian Federation (FinU/FA)
- Other names: FinU, FinUniversity, FinUni, FinUniver, Financial University, (obsolete Finance Academy or FA in colloquial use)
- Former names: Moscow Institute of Economics and Finance, Moscow Finance Institute, State Finance Academy, Finance Academy under the Government of the Russian Federation
- Motto: Ценим прошлое, но основываясь на достигнутом, строим будущее! (Russian)
- Motto in English: We appreciate the past, we look at what we've achieved, and we build the future!
- Type: Public
- Established: 1919
- Endowment: 268 million RUB (2017)
- President: Mikhail Eskindarov
- Rector: Stanislav Prokofiev
- Faculty: 2,999
- Students: 47,245 (2021/2022)
- Undergraduates: 35,242 (2021/2022)
- Postgraduates: 4,103 (2021/2022)
- Doctoral students: 340
- Location: Leningradsky Prospekt 49, Moscow, Russia; 55.8003°N 37.5289°E
- Colors: Dark Turquoise
- Website: fa.ru

Finance University rankings

Global – Overall
- QS World: 1001-1200 (2026)
- THE World: 1001-1200 (2025)

Global – Business and economics
- QS Accounting: 201-250 (2024)
- QS Business: 251-300 (2024)
- QS Economics: 151-200 (2024)
- THE Business and Economics: 301-400 (2025)

Global – Law
- THE Law: 301+ (2025)

Global – Liberal arts
- QS Social Sciences and Management: 368 (2024)
- THE Social Sciences: 601-800 (2025)

Global – Science and engineering
- THE Computer Science: 801-1000 (2025)

Regional – Overall
- QS Emerging Europe and Central Asia: 140 (2022)

National – Overall
- Forbes National: 9 (2025)

Finance University under the Government of the Russian Federation (FinU or Finance University, previously FA or Finance Academy; Russian: Финансовый университет при Правительстве Российской Федерации) is a highly prestigious public university located in Moscow, Russia.

It has been historically considered as one of elite institutions in the Soviet Union and in Russia, a "Billionaire Factory", as well as one of the oldest Russian universities preparing economists, financiers, philosophers, bankers and financial lawyers. Professor Anton Siluanov, the current Minister of Finance and former First Deputy Prime Minister of Russia, serves as the Dean of the Financial University’s Finance Faculty, from which he graduated in 1985.

FinU had several bygone names:

- Moscow Institute of Economics and Finance (1919–1946)
- Moscow Finance Institute (1946–1990)
- State Finance Academy (1991–1992)
- Finance Academy under the Government of the Russian Federation (1992–2010)

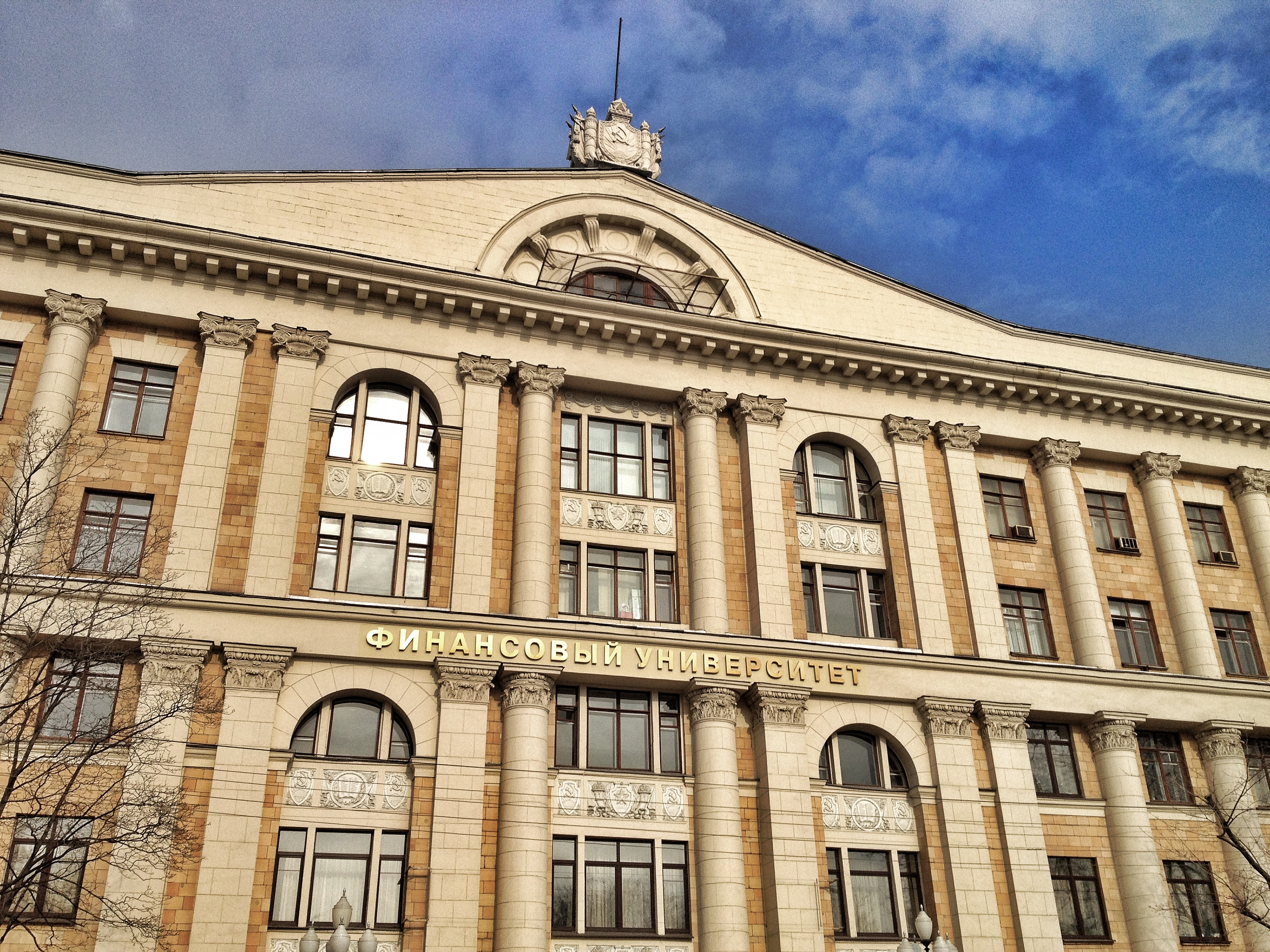
Finance University under the Government of the Russian Federation (FinU) main building

Finance University consists of eight faculties, 52 departments, eight scientific institutes, four high schools, two research institutes, 13 centers, 18 training – science laboratories, a business incubator, and a network of 27 regional subsidiaries across Russia.

== History ==
History of Financial University started in December 1918 when the People's Finance Commissar decided to create a specialized financial institution of higher education – the first in the history of Russia – Moscow Institute of Economics and Finance. It was opened on 2 March 1919, and its first rector was Dmitry Bogolepov – the Moscow State University graduate, the Deputy People's Finance Commissar of RSFSR. In September 1946, the institute was consolidated with Moscow Credit-Economic Institute training students since 1931. As a result of merger of these two institutions of higher education Moscow Finance Institute was formed, with Nikolai Rovinsky as its rector. It began with two thousand students and four faculties: Finance, Economic, Accounting, Credit, Monetary Economics, International Economic Relations. The Military Department opened later, in 1947.

In 1991, Moscow Finance Institute was renamed to "State Finance Academy" and in 1992 Russian president Boris Yeltsin changed its name to the "Finance Academy under the Government of Russian Federation" giving a governmental status to the institution. In 2009, the Finance Academy celebrated 90 years of its history.

On 14 July 2010, the Russian Government approved a new Charter for the institution changing its name from the "Finance Academy" into the "Finance University" and made it an official consultative body to the government.

On 4 March 2011, KPMG opened its own department at the university to enhance cooperation based on lectures and practical activities covering audit, International Financial Reporting Standards, taxation and corporate finance.

In 2011–2012 Financial University finished acquisition of three higher education institutions in Russia: State University of the Russian Ministry of Finance, Tax Academy of the Russian Federation, All-Russian Distance Institute of Finance.

== Departments and faculties ==
The system of higher education established at Finance University includes:

- a pre-university specialised programme to prepare school pupils for entrance to the university
- university programmes (bachelor's degree – certified specialist's degree – master's degree)
- post-graduate and doctorate studies
- second professional higher education in finance and economics
- short-term professional retraining and skill development
- MBA, EMBA, DBA, and MPA programmes

=== Faculties ===
- Higher School of Management
- School of Economics and Business
- School of Finance
- School of Information Technologies and Big Data Analysis
- School of International Economics Relations
- School of Law
- School of Social Science and Mass Communications
- School of Taxes, Audit, and Business Analysis

=== Departments ===
- Accounting in Business Companies
- Administrative and Data Protection Law
- Applied Mathematics
- Applied Political Science
- Applied Social Science
- Audit and Control
- Accounting in Financial and Not-for-Profit Institutions
- Banks and Bank Management
- Business Informatics
- Civil Law
- Computer Science and Programming
- Corporate Governance
- Corporate Finance
- Financial Management
- General Political Science
- Insurance Business
- Investment and Innovations
- Macroeconomics
- Managerial Accounting
- Mathematics
- Macroeconomic Regulation
- Economic Analysis
- Probability Theory and Mathematical Statistics
- Property Valuation and Management
- Public Administration and Municipal Management
- Public Financial Control and Treasury
- Risk Analysis and Economic Security
- Tax Consulting
- Tax Law
- Taxes and Taxation
- Theory of Finance
- Human Resource Management
- Information Security
- Theory and History of State and Law
- Civil and Arbitration Procedure
- Constitutional and Municipal Law
- Criminal Law and Criminal Procedure
- Emergency Management
- Entrepreneurial Law
- Marketing and Logistics
- Microeconomics
- Systematic Economic Analysis
- Statistics
- Applied Psychology
- Foreign Languages
- Philosophy
- Russian Language
- Ernst & Young Department
- KPMG Department

== Academics ==
=== Admissions ===
Admission requirements are among the highest in Russia. In 2024 Finance University received 53 applications per one budget place. According to the latest admission statistics, successful applicant of the year 2024 required to have on average 94 points of the Unified State Examination score in each subject in order to enter the course.

=== Research profile ===
Finance University carries out research activities. These include both fundamental and applied research in the areas of finance, money circulation and credit, insurance, accounting and audit, business evaluation, international monetary relations; research done for post doctoral and PhD dissertations; development of expert-and-analytical materials requested by the bodies of legislative and executive power; organisation of scientific events (conferences, seminars, "roundtables", etc.).

=== Reputation and rankings ===
The university was ranked 1,001-1,200 globally in 2024 in the QS World University Rankings and 401–450 in Economics and Econometrics (the main area of specialisation).

Despite not being highly ranked in international university rankings, the Financial University has gained recognition as one of Russia's leading institutions. Notably, the Department of Engineering at the University of Cambridge, based on internal admission data collected over several years, included the Finance Academy (now the Financial University) among universities in Russia whose degrees were given preferential consideration for admission.

At the time, graduate degrees from the Financial University were assessed as being academically comparable to those from leading National Taiwan universities, which were ranked between 68 and 198 in global rankings such as QS World University Rankings and Times Higher Education (THE).

Based on the average score of the Unified State Examination in 2024, the university was ranked number 8 overall out of 476 Russian institutions of higher education (with annual admission over 200 students) and number 3 among institutions specialising in social sciences. It also had the 5th highest number of national Olympiad winners and prizewinners admitted without exams (after HSE, ITMO, MIPT and MSU).

Integrated ranking of the Russian journal "Finance" put the Financial University as the best higher institution for economics and finance in 2010. The university became the competition winner "Golden Medal "European Quality" in the category of "100 Best Institutions of Higher Education in Russia". Furthermore, according to the ranking of Huazhong University of Science and Technology, the Finance University is placed third among top 100 Russia's institutions of higher education. The Financial University was also ranked among 32 best business schools in the world (1st in Russia and 16th in Europe) in 2013 by the "Ranking Web of World Business Schools".

== Elite Status ==
The Financial University, and its predecessor the Moscow Finance Institute (MFI), holds a unique status among Russian universities. It has federal university status and is included among the privileged consultative bodies of the Russian government, alongside institutions such as MSU, HSE, RANEPA and SPbU.

During the Soviet era, the Financial University maintained a restricted admission policy, primarily serving the Soviet elite. Admission was largely limited to individuals with high-level connections within the Communist Party and government structures. Some of its faculties, particularly the International Economic Relations Faculty (MEO), were regarded as equivalent to the Economic Faculty of MGIMO. Graduates from these programs were frequently assigned to foreign offices of Soviet state institutions, including central banks and trade missions.

Western scholars have noted that, despite official state rhetoric denying elitism, Soviet higher education exhibited clear hierarchical stratification. Not all faculties of even prestigious institutions like MSU or SPbU were considered elite. While institutions such as Moscow Institute of Physics and Technology (MIPT), National Research Nuclear University (MEPhI), Bauman Moscow State Technical University (Baumanka), and the Mathematics and Physics faculties of MSU were among the most academically rigorous, they were not necessarily at the highest elite level in terms of social mobility and political access. Admission to these programs was exceptionally competitive, but even candidates (especially the Jewish ones) with outstanding academic records often faced insurmountable barriers without the right political or family background. In contrast, universities with strong ties to the nomenklatura, such as MGIMO, MFI, and select faculties of MSU, served as direct pipelines to influential government and financial positions.

According to a study by Kryshtanovskaya & White (From Soviet Nomenklatura to Russian Élite, Europe-Asia Studies, 1996), the Moscow Finance Institute was a key supplier of professionals to the financial and business sectors, alongside institutions such as MGIMO and the Law and Economics faculties of MSU.

In the post-Soviet era, the Financial University has maintained its prominent role in shaping Russia's economic and financial elite. According to Forbes Russia, it ranks third among the universities producing the highest number of Russian billionaires, closely following MSU and MGIMO. It is also consistently ranked among the most influential universities for elite formation in Russia by RAEX rankings (with others being MSU, SpU, MGIMO and RANEPA).

== Academic Publishing ==
=== Review of Business and Economics Studies ===
Review of Business and Economics Studies (also known as RoBES) is a quarterly peer-reviewed academic journal covering economics and business. It was established in 2013. It is published by Financial University under the Government of the Russian Federation.

==== Aim and scope ====
The Review of Business and Economics Studies aims to select topics in economics and business science that are of interest for decision-makers in business and government, and connect business and state authorities to academia by delivering deep insights. The Review of Business and Economics Studies defines its scope as covering significant developments in economics and business including macroeconomics, microeconomics, international economics, international finance, international trade, industrial organization, labour economics, political economy, monetary theory, fiscal policy and socioeconomics.

==== Abstracting and indexing ====
The journal is included in the Russian Science Citation Index – a component of the Scientific Electronic Library ru:eLIBRARY.RU. The journal is abstracted and indexed in: Google Scholar, Research Papers in Economics (RePEc), EconPapers – a service of Research Papers in Economics (RePEc), Scilit, ResearchGate, Scientific Electronic Library Cyberleninka, RoBES is included in the Directory of Open Access Journals. ISSN 2308-944X. eISSN 2587-7089.

==== Editorial processes ====
All submissions undergo a double-blind peer review. The review is carried out by the editorial board members and external experts on behalf of the editorial board. All reviewers must be experts on the subject of the reviewed materials.

==== Editors-in-Chief ====
2023–present: Dr. Pavel S. Seleznev

2013–2022: Dr. Alexander I. Ilyinsky ru:Ильинский, Александр Иоильевич

==== Notable papers ====
According to Google Scholar, the following three papers have been cited most frequently:

- Dźwigoł, H. (25 April 2020). "Interim management as a new approach to the company management". Review of Business and Economics Studies. 8 (1): 20–26. doi:10.26794/2308-944X-2020-8-1-20-26.
- Kuzmin, Anton (2014). "A structural model of exchange rate dynamics". Review of Business and Economics Studies. 2 (3): 86–92.
- Eroshkin, S.Y.; Kallaur, G.Y.; Papikian, L.M. (2016). "Lean construction and BIM: complementing each other for better project management". Review of Business and Economics Studies. 4 (4): 17–22.

== Notable alumni ==
Among the graduates are:

=== Academia ===
- Alla Gryaznova – economist, former rector and current president of the Finance University
- Mikhail Eskindarov – President of the Finance University

=== Business ===
- Andrey Akimov – CEO and deputy chairman of board of directors of Gazprombank
- Andrey Bokarev – billionaire, chairman of the board of directors of "Kuzbassrazrezugol" Holding Company
- Andrey Borodin – billionaire, former CEO of the Bank of Moscow
- Andrey Elinson – former Deputy CEO Basic Element, former Managing Partner A1, the Founder of Inweasta
- Bella Zlatkis – deputy chairman of management board at Sberbank, former deputy finance minister of Russia
- Gennady Soldatenkov – deputy president and chairman of the management board of VTB Bank
- Kirill Pisarev – billionaire, co-owner of PIK Group
- Mikhail Alekseev – chairman of the management board of UniCredit Bank
- Konstantin Kagalovsky – billionaire, former vice-president of Yukos and Bank Menatep
- Mikhail Gutseriyev – billionaire, former owner and CEO of Russneft
- Mikail Shishkhanov – billionaire, president and CEO of B&N Bank
- Mikhail Prokhorov – self-made billionaire and oligarch, the second richest man in Russia according to Forbes
- Valeriy Novikov – chief operating officer and member of the executive board of Alfa-Bank
- Vasily Titov – first deputy president and chairman of the management board of VTB Bank
- Vladimir Dmitriev – chairman of Vnesheconombank
- Vladimir Golubkov – chief executive officer of Rosbank

=== Politics ===
- Alexei Navalny – politician, political prisoner, investigative blogger, World Fellow at Yale University's "World Fellows Program, Moscow mayor candidate
- Alexander Khloponin – deputy prime minister and presidential plenipotentiary envoy to the North Caucasian Federal District
- Anton Drozdov – chairman of the pension fund of the Russian Federation
- Anton Siluanov – dean of the Finance Faculty, current finance minister of the Russian Federation
- Arseny Zverev – finance minister of the Soviet Government in 1938–1948, and 1948–1960
- Boris Fedorov – economist and reformer, former finance minister and deputy prime minister of Russia
- Elena Panina – MP, State Duma of the Russian Federation
- Nadezhda Maksimova – MP, State Duma of the Russian Federation
- N.K. Sokolov – chairman of the board of the USSR State Bank in 1940
- N.V. Garetovsky – chairman of the board of the USSR State Bank in 1987–1989
- Sergey Shakhray – deputy prime minister of Russia in 1991–1996, Russian constitution author and chief of staff of the accounts chamber of the Russian Federation
- Sergei Stepashin – chairman of the accounts chamber of the Russian Federation and former Prime Minister of Russia
- Valentin Pavlov – prime minister of the Cabinet of Ministers of the USSR in 1991, minister of finance in 1989–1990 and chairman of the State Committee on Prices in 1986–1989
- Viktor Gerashchenko – banker and former chairman of the Central Bank of Russia and USSR
- Vladimir Panskov – finance minister of the Russian Federation in 1994–1996, auditor of the accounts chamber of the Russian Federation in 1997–2006
- Oksana Lut – economist and politician, Minister of Agriculture of Russia since 2024

=== Sport ===
- Svetlana Feofanova – pole vaulter, world champion and holder of silver and bronze medals in 2004 Summer Olympics and 2008 Summer Olympics
- Nathalie Péchalat – French ice dancer, the 2009 French national champion and the 2009 Grand Prix Final bronze medalist
- Khabib Nurmagomedov –mixed martial artist, former UFC Lightweight champion and a two-time Combat Sambo World Champion.

== International cooperation ==
Before the 2022 Russian invasion of Ukraine and the subsequent severance of academic cooperation with Russia by much of the international community, the Financial University under the Government of the Russian Federation had established numerous agreements with partner institutions in Australia, the United Kingdom, Germany, Spain, China, the United States, the Czech Republic, and other countries.

According to its official website, the university claims to have over 160 international partners and membership in 12 international associations and university networks. However, the publicly available list of active partnerships is much smaller and includes:

Short-Term and Exchange Programmes:

- Zhongnan University of Economics and Law (Wuhan, China)
- Jiangxi University of Finance and Economics (Nanchang, China)
- Singidunum University (Belgrade, Serbia)

Joint Educational Programmes:

- International Economics and Business Engineering – Partner: Shandong University of Finance and Economics (China)
- International Economics and Trade (with a focus on Chinese economy and language studies) – Partner: Jilin University (China)

Specialised Programmes in Finance, IT, and Risk Management:

- Software Development Technologies, Data Engineering, Logistics, and Corporate Finance – Partner: Dalian University of Information Technology “NEUSOFT” (China)
- Financial Risk Management: Applied Analytics and Banking Technologies – Partner: Vietnam Banking Academy (Vietnam)
- Business and Finance in the Social Sector – Target audience: 2nd-year undergraduate students in the “Economics” programme at the National University of Uzbekistan named after M. Ulugbek
- International Taxation – Target audience: 2nd-year undergraduate students in the “International Taxation” programme at Tashkent State University of Economics (Fiscal Institute under the State Tax Committee of Uzbekistan)
- Finance and Banking, Bachelor of Business Administration (BBA) – Target audience: 2nd-year undergraduate students in the “Business Management” programme at the Financial and Economic University of Mongolia

== Other facts ==
Financial University is a member of the Russian Law Journal consortium.

== See also ==
- List of business schools in Europe
