= List of Saint Petersburg State University people =

The following is a list of notable alumni and faculty of Saint Petersburg State University, located in Saint Petersburg, Russia.

== Alumni ==
=== Nobel laureates ===
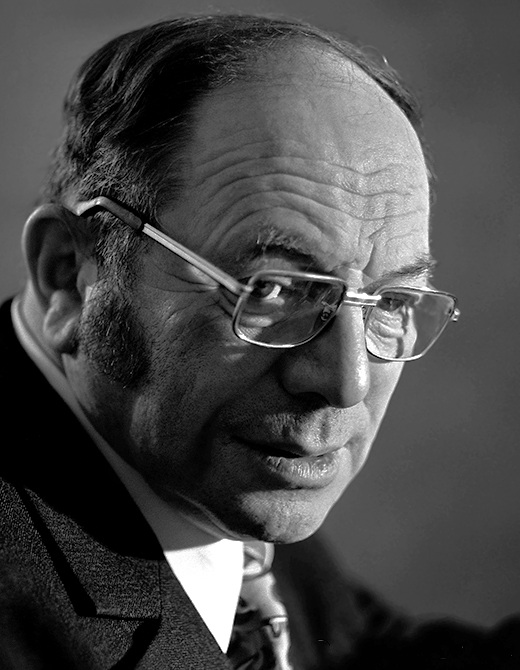
Leonid Kantorovich

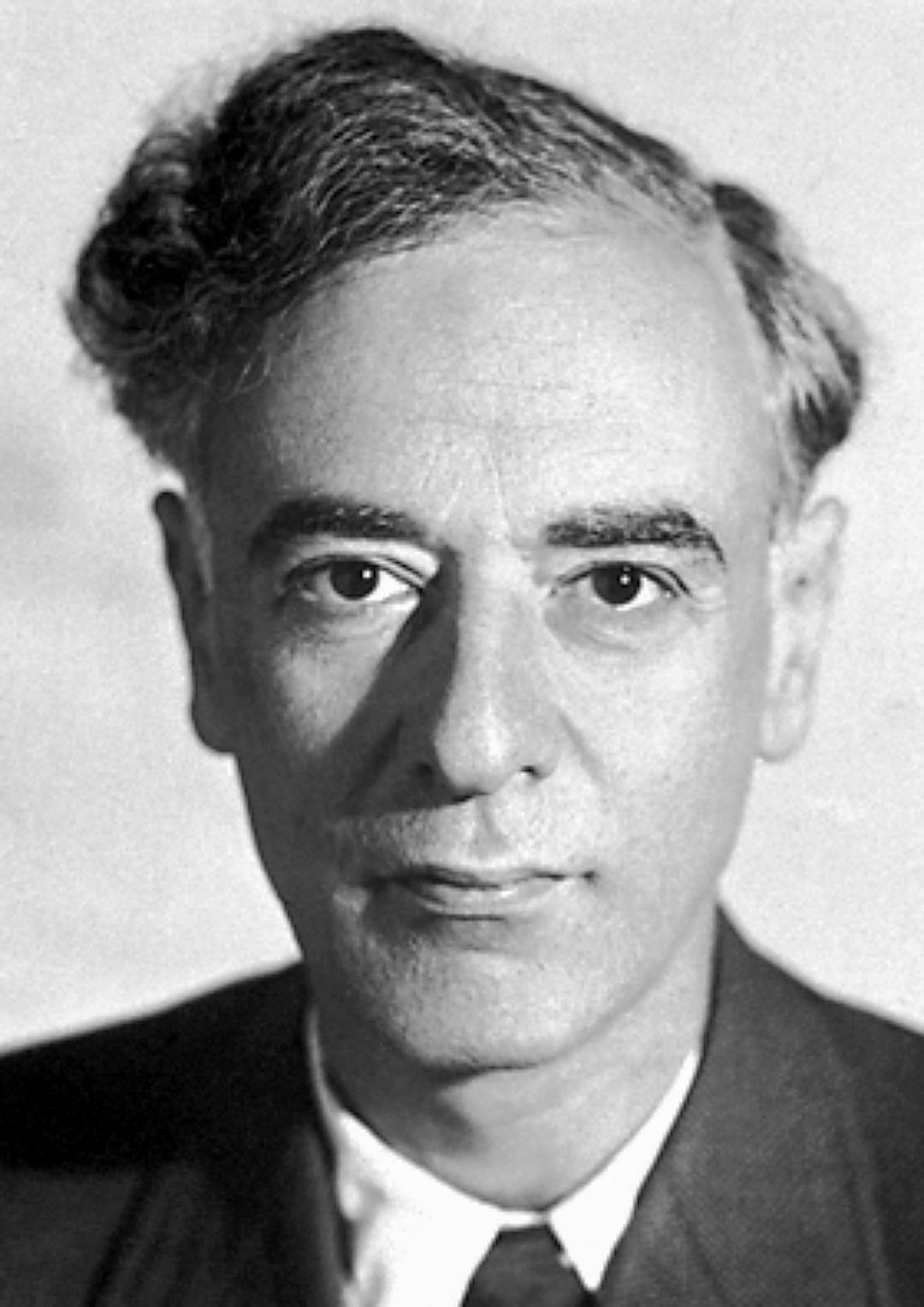
Lev Landau

- Valery Leibin – psychoanalyst, professor
- Ilya Mechnikov – Russian-French, Physiology or Medicine in 1908
- Yuri Orlov – zoologist, paleontologist
- Ivan Pavlov – physiologist, psychologist, and physician; Nobel laureate in Physiology or Medicine in 1904
- Nikolay Semyonov – Chemistry in 1956
- Lev Landau – physicist; Nobel laureate in Physics in 1962
- Alexander Prokhorov – Australian-Soviet-Russian, Physics in 1964
- Wassily Leontief – Soviet-American economist; Nobel laureate in Economics in 1973
- Leonid Kantorovich – economist, Nobel laureate in Economics in 1975
- Joseph Brodsky – Russian-American, Literature in 1987

=== Fields Medal ===
- Grigori Perelman
- Stanislav Smirnov

=== Academia ===
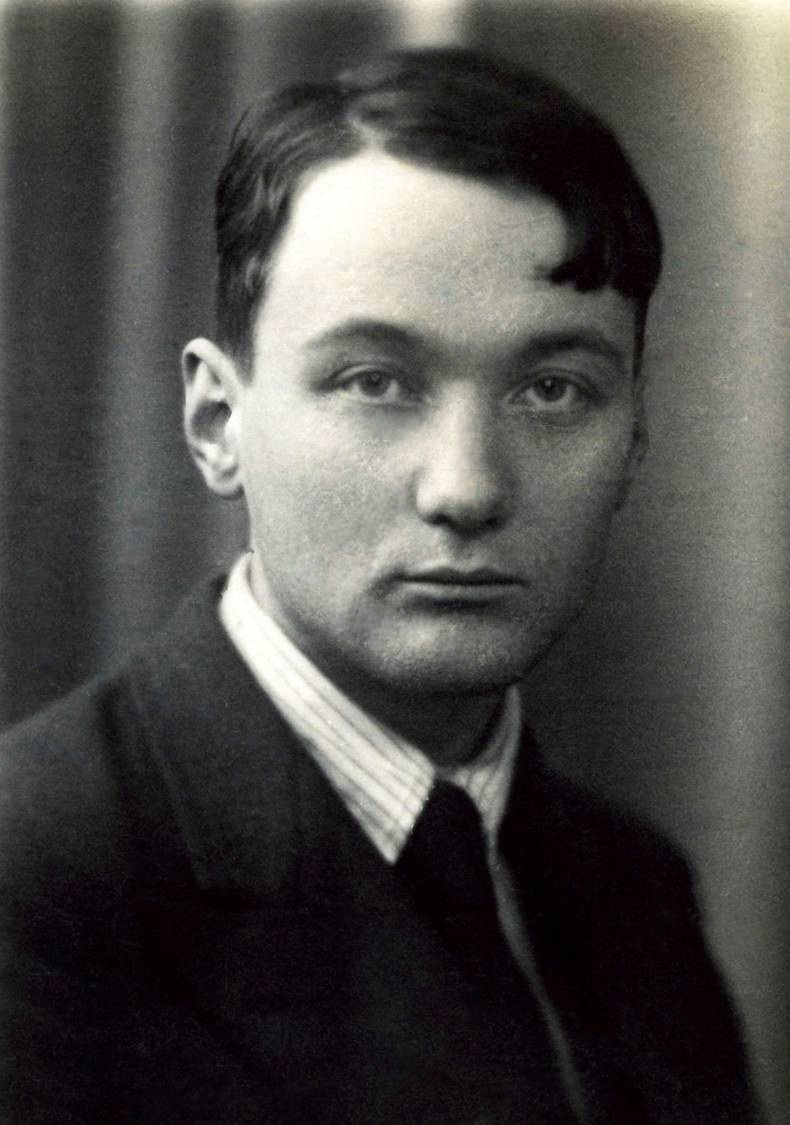
Lev Gumilev

- Gregory Areshian – Armenian-American archaeologist and historian.
- Rakhat Achylova – Kyrgyz sociologist and politician
- Volodymyr Barvinok – Ukrainian historian and writer
- Kazimieras Būga – Lithuanian linguist and philologist
- Nina Dyakonova – professor, Doctor of Philology
- Viktor Fainberg – philologist and dissident
- Nikolai Girenko – ethnologist and human rights activist
- Lev Gumilev – historian, ethnologist, anthropologist, and translator
- Igor Ivanov – pedagogue
- Marju Lepajõe – classical philologist
- Dmitry Likhachev – scholar
- Anne Lill – classical philologist
- Vladimir Lossky – Eastern Orthodox theologian
- Yakov Lyubarsky – scholar, Doctor of Philology, specialist in Byzantine studies
- Stepan Malkhasyants – Armenian academician, philologist, linguist, and lexicographer
- Nikolay Marr – historian and linguist
- Sergey Oldenburg – orientalist
- Boris B. Piotrovsky – academician, historian-orientalist and archaeologist
- Sergey Platonov – historian
- Isaak Izrailevich Prezent – philosopher of biology
- Fyodor Shcherbatskoy – Indologist
- Mikhail Shultz – chemist, academician
- Pitirim Sorokin – sociologist
- Vasily Vasilievich Struve – orientalist
- Max Vasmer – German linguist

=== Government and politics ===
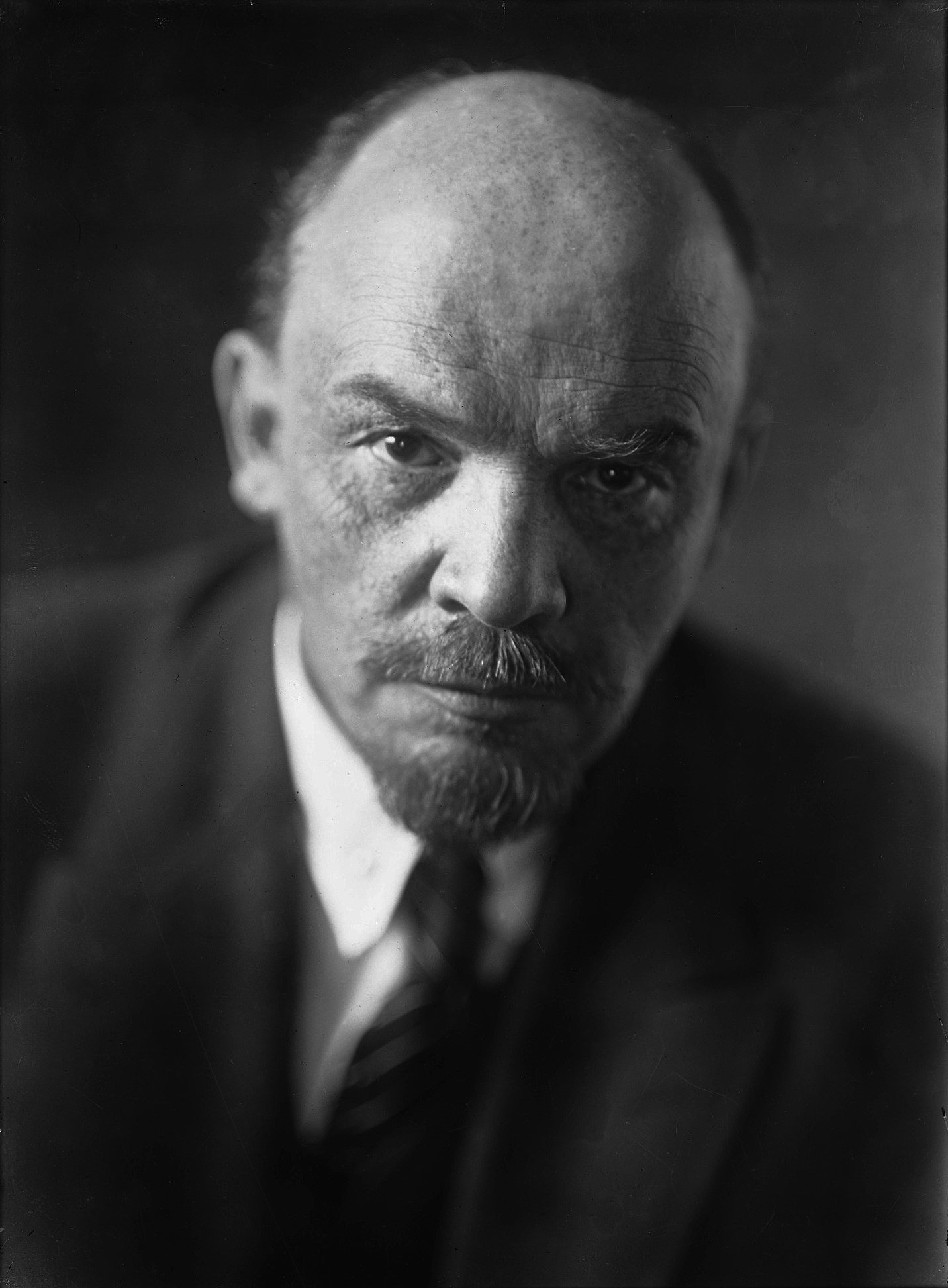
Vladimir Lenin

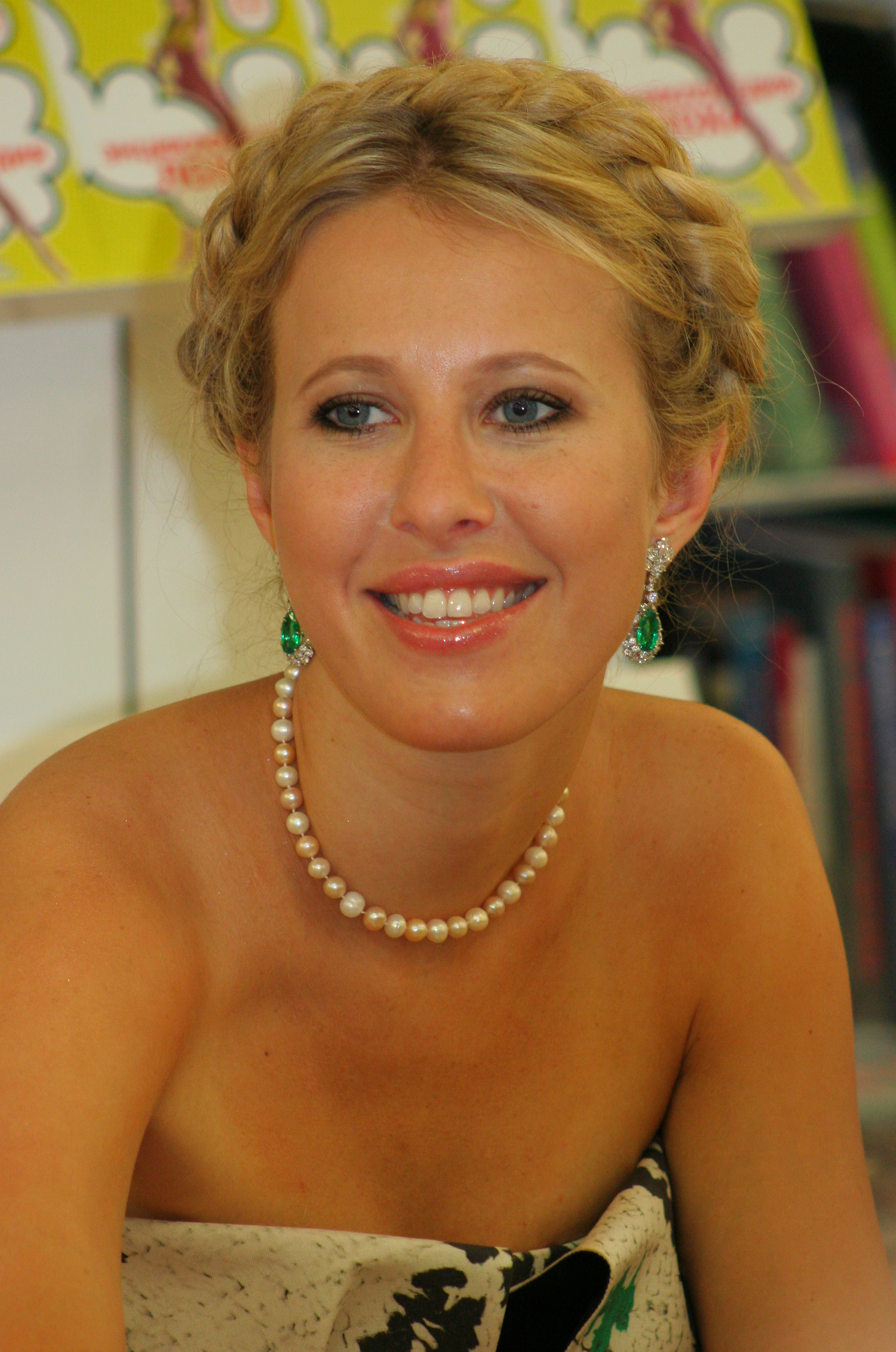
Ksenia Sobchak

- Vladimir Burtsev – revolutionary activist, scholar, publisher and editor
- David Dallin – Belarusian-American one-time Menshevik leader; writer and lecturer
- Ben-Zion Dinur – minister of education of Israel
- Dalia Grybauskaite – president of Lithuania 2009–2019
- Ion Inculeţ – president of the Moldavian Democratic Republic
- Alexander Kerensky – second prime minister of the Russian Provisional Government
- Vladimir Lenin – first head of the Russian SFSR
- Dmitry Medvedev – politician, businessman, lawyer, and the third President of the Russian Federation (2008–2012)
- Lyudmila Narusova – Russian Federation senator
- Vladimir Putin – second president of the Russian Federation (2000–2008, since 2012); (2008–2012)
- Mark Slonim – politician, literary critic, scholar, and translator
- Antanas Smetona – president of Lithuania (first term 1919-1920; second term 1926-1940)
- Anatoly Sobchak – politician and a co-author of the Constitution of the Russian Federation
- Ksenia Sobchak – candidate for Russian presidency, public figure, TV anchor, journalist, socialite, and actress
- Levon Ter-Petrosyan – first President of Armenia (1991–1998)
- Jazep Varonka – first chairman of the People's Secretariat (i.e., prime minister) of the Belarusian National Republic
- Augustinas Voldemaras – prime minister of Lithuania

=== The arts, including literature ===
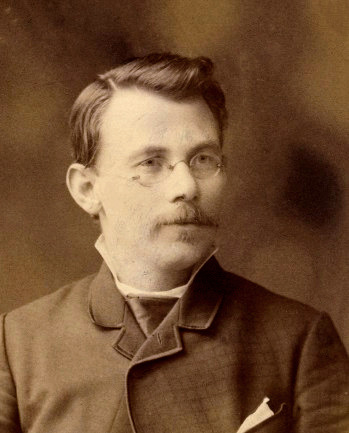
Salomon Mandelkern

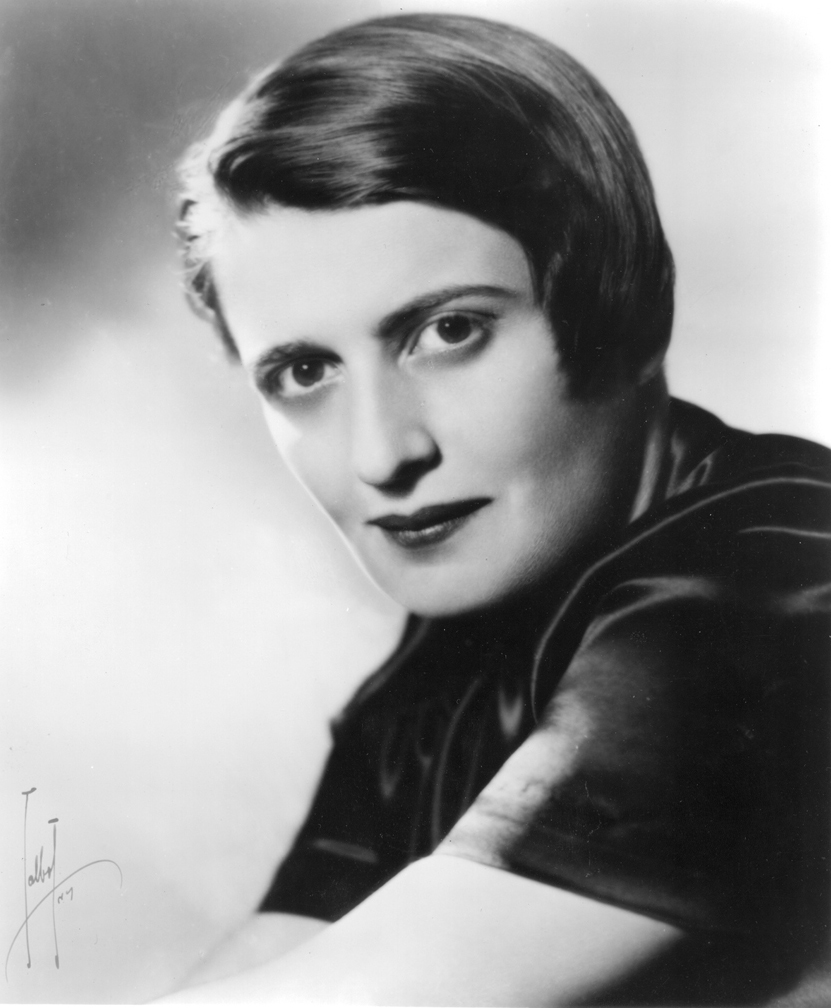
Ayn Rand

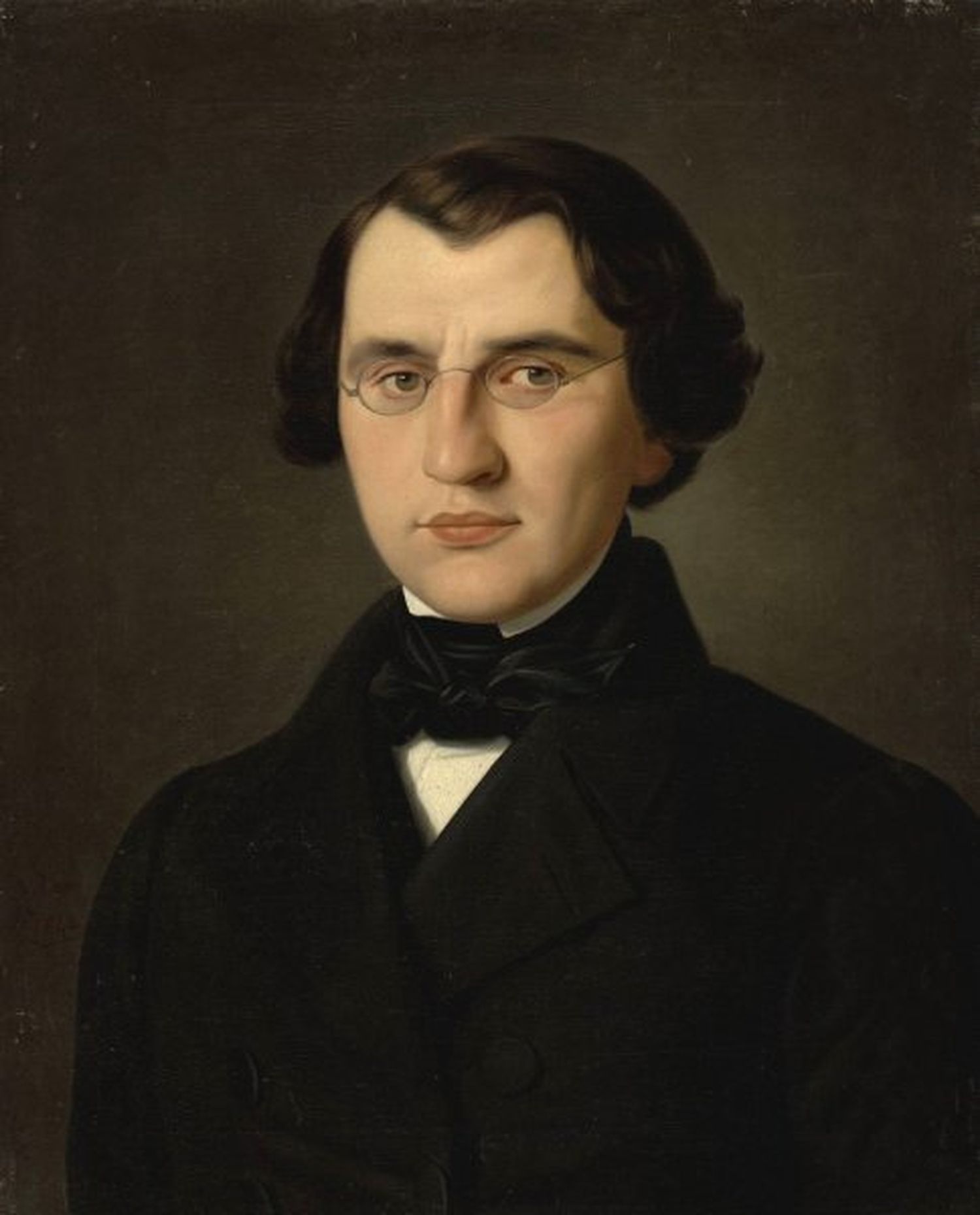
Ivan Turgenev

- Johann Admoni – composer, pianist, teacher, and public person
- Alexander Blok – poet
- Joseph Brodsky – Russian and American poet and essayist; Nobel Prize winner
- Ilia Chavchavadze – Georgian writer, politician and public benefactor
- Igor Chubais – philosopher, sociologist, and author
- Solomon Dodashvili – Georgian philosopher, grammarian, belletrist
- Boris Grebenshchikov – founder and lead singer of the band Aquarium
- Yehuda L. Katzenelson – writer and doctor
- Alexander Kugel – theatre critic and editor
- Julian Henry Lowenfeld – American-Russian poet, playwright, trial lawyer, composer, and translator
- Salomon Mandelkern — poet and author
- Olga Ozarovskaya – folklorist, storyteller, performer, writer, and an archivist of fairy tales
- Ayn Rand – Russian-born American novelist and philosopher
- Nicholas Roerich – artist
- Mahapandit Rahul Sankrityayan – Indian historian
- Lyubov Speranskaya – theater artist
- Maximilian Steinberg – composer of classical music
- Igor Stravinsky – composer
- Ivan Turgenev – writer

=== Science and mathematics ===
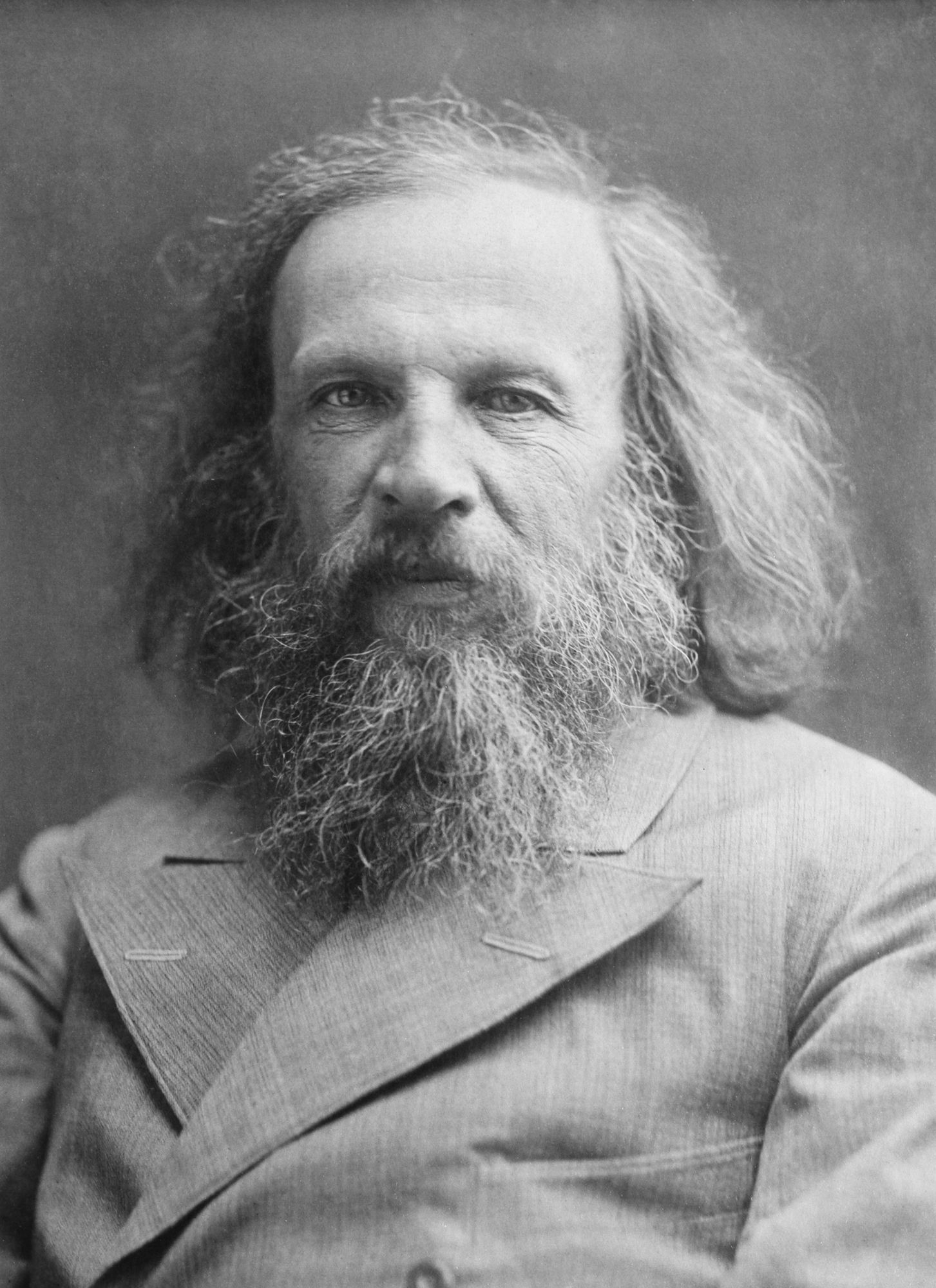
Dmitri Mendeleev

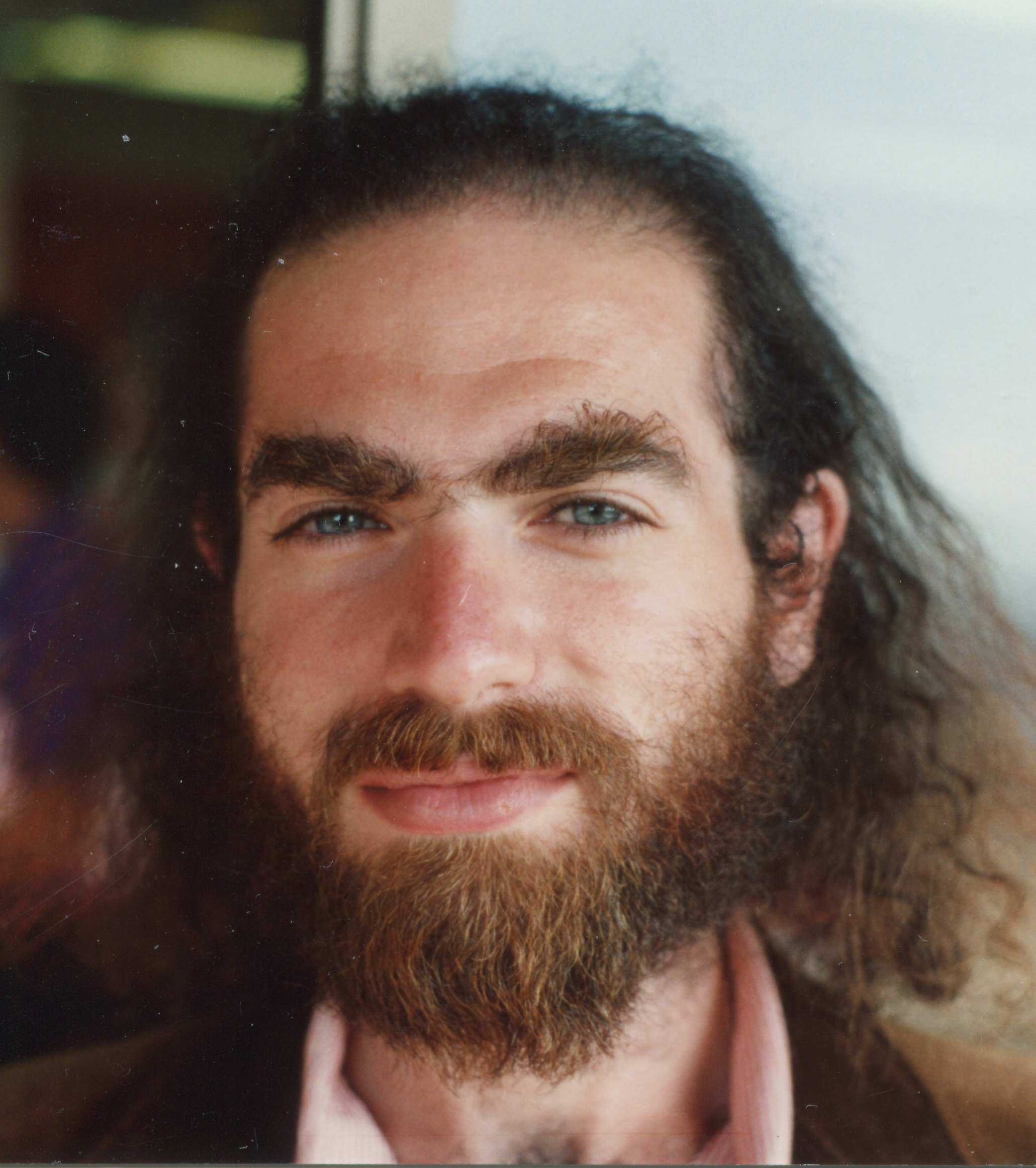
Grigori Perelman

- Alexander Barvinok – mathematician
- Raissa Berg – Russian-American geneticist and evolutionary biologist
- Abram Besicovitch – Russian-British mathematician
- Lev M. Bregman – Soviet-Israeli mathematician
- Pafnuty Chebyshev – mathematician
- Yakov Eliashberg – Russian-American mathematician
- Vera Faddeeva – mathematician
- Vladimir Fock – physicist
- Sergey Fomin – Russian-American mathematician
- Leonid Frankfurt – Russian-Israeli physicist
- George Gamow – Soviet-American cosmologist
- Israel Gohberg – Soviet-Israeli mathematician
- Mikhail Gromov – Franco-Russian mathematician, Abel Prize winner
- Alexander Alfonsovich Grossheim – Ukrainian botanist
- Georges Gurvitch – Russian-born French sociologist and jurist
- Solomon Herzenstein – zoologist
- Cecil Hoare FRS – British protozoologist and parasitologist
- Alexander Its – mathematician
- Ivan Ivanov – mathematician
- Dmitry Ivanovsky – biologist
- Faina Mihajlovna Kirillova – mathematician and control theorist
- Leo Klejn – archaeologist, anthropologist, and philologist
- Wladimir Köppen – Russian-German geographer, meteorologist, climatologist and botanist
- Yuri Linnik – mathematician
- Mikhail Lomonosov – scientist, writer and polymath
- Aleksandr Lyapunov – mathematician, mechanician and physicist
- Victor Lyatkher – renewable energy engineer
- Andrey Markov – mathematician
- Dmitri Mendeleev – chemist; creator of the first version of the periodic table of elements
- Boris Nikolsky – chemist
- Grigori Perelman – mathematician, Fields Medal winner (2006, declined), and only man to solve a Millennium Prize Problem (2010, prize declined)
- Konstantin Petrzhak – physicist
- Alexander Raikhel – Soviet-American entomologist
- Natasha Raikhel – Soviet-American plant cell biologist
- Lev Pavlovich Rapoport – theoretical physicist
- Vladimir Rokhlin – mathematician
- Nikolai Semenov – physicist and chemist
- Stanislav Smirnov – mathematician, Fields Medal winner (2010)
- Jacob Tamarkin – Russian-American mathematician
- Vladimir Vernadsky – mineralogist and geochemist
- Georgy Voronoy – mathematician
- Emil Wiesel – Russian-German artist; museum curator; full member of the Russian Imperial Academy of Arts (since 1914); organizer of international art exhibitions; councilor of Hermitage and Russian museum
- Sergei Winogradsky – microbiologist, ecologist and soil scientist
- Yuri Yappa – theoretical physicist
- Victor Zalgaller – Russian-Israeli mathematician

=== Other ===
- Alexander Alekhine – Russian-French fourth World Chess Champion
- Mahinda Balasuriya – 32nd inspector general of the Sri Lanka Police (IGP) (2009–2011)
- Viktor Korchnoi – Soviet and Swiss chess grandmaster and chess writer
- Grigory Levenfish – chess player; two-time Soviet champion
- Vladas Petronaitis – Lithuanian patriot, soldier and martyr
- Józef Pluskowski – Polish poet and member of the Polish Resistance
- Yakov Rekhter – co-founder of BGP and MPLS networking protocols
- Gennadiy Shatkov – Olympic champion in boxing
- Eduard Vinokurov (1942–2010) – Kazakh-born Soviet Olympic and world champion fencer

== Faculty only ==
- Leonhard Euler – Swiss mathematician and physicist
- Nikolai Gogol – Russian-literature writer of Ukrainian origin; historian
- Rada Granovskaya – psychologist
- Rahul Sankrityayan – Indian independence activist, writer and a polyglot who wrote in Hindi
- Ivan Sechenov – physiologist
- Zare Yusupova – philologist, Kurdish linguist
