= Karagezyan =

Karagezyan (Russian: Карагезян or Карагезьян) is a Russian surname. Notable people with the surname include:

- Andronik Karagezyan (born 1974), Russian football player
- Karen Karagezyan (1935–2025), Soviet and Russian journalist, translator, and writer
