= Anatoly Chernyaev =

Soviet historian and politician

Anatoly S. Chernyaev
- Born: Anatoly Sergeevich Chernyaev; 25 May 1921; Moscow, Russian SFSR, Soviet Union
- Died: 12 March 2017 (aged 95)

Anatoly Sergeevich Chernyaev (May 25, 1921 – March 12, 2017) was a Russian politician and writer, member of the Central Committee of the Communist Party of the USSR, who became foreign-policy advisor to General Secretary Mikhail Gorbachev in 1986–1991.

After fighting in World War II, Chernyaev studied history at Moscow State University, History Faculty, and later taught contemporary history from 1950 to 1958. In 1961, he joined the International Department of the Central Committee of the Communist Party of the Soviet Union, where he became a senior analyst. In March 1976, he was promoted to Central Auditing Commission of the Communist Party of the Soviet Union. In 1986, he became General Secretary Gorbachev's foreign-policy advisor and continued to advise Gorbachev when the latter became President of the Soviet Union.

== Early life ==
Chernyaev was born in Moscow (Maryina Roshcha) in 1921. For high school, he attended the Gorky Experimental School No. 1, which was a top elite high school in Moscow specializing in preparing Soviet intellectual elite mainly in humanitarian disciplines. After graduating high school, he was accepted to Moscow State University History Faculty in 1938.

== Career ==
In July 1941, after Hitler's attack on the Soviet Union, Chernyaev, barely 20, joined the Red Army as volunteer and was sent to the front. He was wounded, spent time in the hospital and returned to the front again. He finished his military service in May 1945 in Riga. After the war he graduated from Moscow University with a doctorate in history and taught there in the Department of Contemporary History in 1950–1958.

=== The Prague Years ===
In 1958 Chernyaev joined the group of Soviet and international editors of the main publication of international communist movement Problems of Peace and Socialism in Prague. The journal became a center of free-thinking and internal dissent, which produced many of future Gorbachev's advisers and allies. In Prague Chernyaev met and developed life-long relationships with leaders of European communist and socialist parties and influential Soviet thinkers such as Alexander Bovin, Georgy Shakhnazarov, Georgy Arbatov and Karen Brutents.

=== Central Committee ===
In 1961 Chernyaev left Prague and was invited to join the International Department of the Central Committee as referent and later rose to deputy head of the department under Boris Ponomarev. His main focus was international communist movement, which gave him an opportunity to travel extensively in Europe and meet with many prominent leaders of the Eurocommunism. Chernyaev was shocked by the Soviet invasion of Czechoslovakia in 1968 and thought of retiring from the Central Committee, but decided to stay on hoping for a reform from within the system. In the 1970s he also worked as speechwriter for the Soviet leader Leonid Brezhnev and his own boss Ponomarev. In 1972 he started writing an almost daily diary documenting the internal life and work of the highest Soviet political organs. He later donated his diary to the National Security Archive. By the mid-1980s, Chernyaev established himself as one of leading intellectual free thinkers in the Central Committee. He published in a wide variety of Soviet and international journals.

=== Perestroika ===
In 1985 Chernyaev welcomed the accession of Mikhail Gorbachev as new General Secretary of the Politburo of the CC CPSU, the top Soviet leader. In March 1986 he joined the reformers as top foreign policy aide to Gorbachev. Over the next six years, Chernyaev was the closest assistant helping Gorbachev formulate his foreign policies and influencing his views. His ideas provided basis for many Soviet reformist policy positions in the late 1980s. Gorbachev called Chernyaev "my alter ego." He accompanied Gorbachev to all his summits with Ronald Reagan and George H. W. Bush in 1986–1991, starting from the famous Reykjavik summit, where the Soviet and American leaders came close to abolishing nuclear weapons. In 1990, Chernyaev was closely involved in negotiations on German unification in a small group of advisers. In August 1991, he was with Gorbachev and his family when the Soviet leader was imprisoned at his summer residence in Foros by hard-line coup plotters led by Soviet KGB head Vladimir Kryuchkov and Defense Minister Dmitry Yazov.

=== Post-Soviet Russia ===
After the dissolution of the Soviet Union, Chernyaev joined the non-governmental research institute and archive, the Gorbachev Foundation, where he worked closely with Gorbachev and other former officials until his retirement in 2010. He edited and published volumes of declassified documents, including a set of Politburo notes taken by Gorbachev's aides during 1985–1990. He became a leading scholar and advocate of access to documents on the Gorbachev period in the post-Soviet Russia. Chernyaev remained a close associate of Mikhail Gorbachev until his death in 2017.

In 2004, Chernyaev donated his diaries from the Gorbachev period to the National Security Archive at George Washington University, which has published portions of them in English translation; according to the editor, "One can confidently say that every bold foreign policy initiative advanced by Gorbachev in the years 1985–1991 bears Chernyaev's mark on it."

Since then, the National Security Archive has made Chernyaev's diaries available from 1972 to the fall of the Soviet Union in 1991. English translations of the original documents are available as pdf files.

== Selected works ==
- Anatoly S. Chernyaev, Моя жизнь и мое время (Moscow: Mezhdunarodnye otnosheniya, 1995)
- Anatoly S. Chernyaev My Six Years with Gorbachev (Penn State University Press, 2000)
- Anatoly Chernyaev, Izbrannoe (Moscow: Sobranie, 2011)
- "My nazyvali ego grafom": Pamyati A.S. Chernyaeva (Moscow: Lyubimaya Rossiya, 2019)
