= Shakhnazarov =

Shakhnazarov (Russian: Шахназа́ров) is a surname. Notable people with the surname include:

- Georgy Shakhnazarov (1924–2001), Soviet politician and political scientist
- Karen Shakhnazarov (born 1952), Soviet and Russian film director, producer, and screenwriter
