= Valery Leibin =

Russian psychoanalysist (born 1942)

Valery Moiseevich Leibin
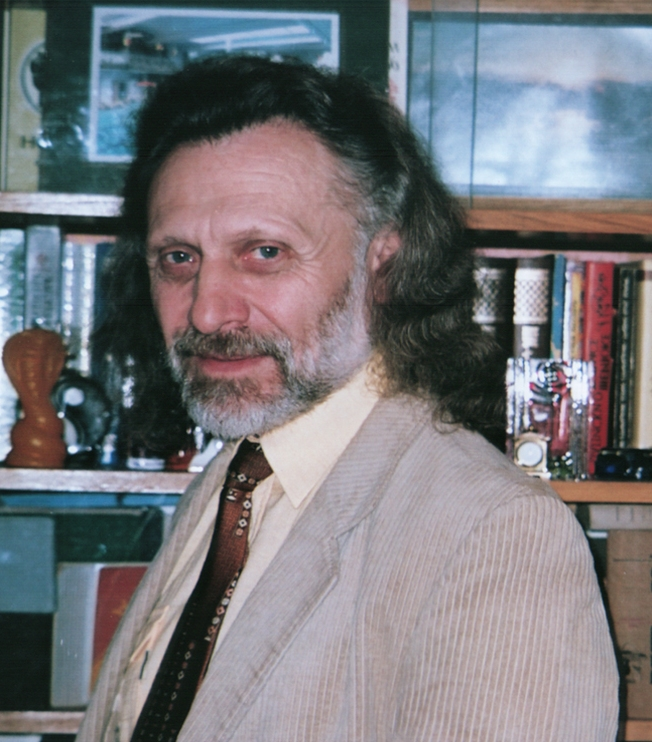
- Born: 8 March 1942 (age 84); Selo Khmelyovka in Kirov region, Russia
- Known for: Expert in the field of psychoanalysis
- Title: Professor
- Scientific career
- Fields: Psychoanalysis, globalistics, system research
- Workplaces: Russian Academy of Sciences

Valery Moiseevich Leibin (born 8 March 1942 in the village of Khmelyovka in Zuevskiy district of Kirov region in Russia) is a Russian psychoanalyst, Ph.D., head of the department of history and theory of psychoanalysis in Institute of Psychoanalysis, Professor of Moscow State Medical Stomatological University, an honorary Doctor of East European Institute of Psychoanalysis, an honorary member of the interregional public organization Russian Psychoanalytical Society, a member of the Academy of Pedagogical and Social Sciences, a chief scientist of Institute for Systems Analysis of Russian Academy of Sciences, a member of the editorial boards of the "Russian Psychoanalytic Bulletin" (since 1991), the philosophic psychoanalytic journal "Archetype" (since 1996), "Psychoanalytic Review" (since 1997) and "Review of Psychoanalysis" (since 2005). According to the rating given by "Psychological newspaper" Valery Leibin is in the top ten most prominent psychoanalysts in Russia.

== Education ==
Valery Leibin graduated from the Faculty of Philosophy of Leningrad State University (1969) and accomplished a post-graduate course in the Institute of Philosophy of the Russian Academy of Sciences (1972). In 1972 he defended his thesis "Philosophy of social criticism in the United States", presented for the degree of PhD, and in 1982 - defended his doctoral thesis on "Psychoanalysis and American neofreydizm (historical-philosophical analysis of Freudianism)".

== Fields of scientific activity ==
Fields of his scientific activities: history, theory and practice of psychoanalysis, globalistics, system research. In the 1970s Valery Leibin wrote and published a number of papers on the analysis of the works of A.Adler, H.Marcuse, V.Reich, H.Sullivan, S.Freud, K.Horney, K.Jung. In the 1980s he published in foreign magazines a number of materials on the spreading of ideas of A.Adler in Russia and about the scientific status of psychoanalysis. In 1995-1997 he conducted an empirical study of the attitude of Russian students to psychoanalytic ideas, particularly to the Oedipus complex. He participated in the International Congress of unconscious mental activity (1978, Tbilisi), in the sections of psychopolitics at the XIV World Congress of the International Political Sciences Association (1988, Washington, DC), in the International Symposium "The Soviet culture today: Rebuilding the past or inventing the future?"(1991, USA, Duke University), in the International Conference "100 years of psychoanalysis: Russian roots, repression and the return of Russia into the international psychoanalytic community" (1996, St. Petersburg), in the International Russian-Austrian scientific and practical conference "Sigmund Freud and psychoanalysis in the context of the Austrian and Russian cultures" (2000, Moscow), in the Second International Conference "System Analysis and Information Technology" (2007, Obninsk), in the Third International Conference "System Analysis and Information Technology"(2009, Zvenigorod) and in several other Russian conferences on psychoanalysis, globalistics, system research. In 1997-1999 Valery Leibin was a member of the commission of the Russian State Committee for Science and High Technology which developed the Federal target program "Revival and development of philosophica, clinical and applied psychoanalysis"].

== Pedagogical activities ==
From 1991 to 1995 at the Russian Open University Valery Leibin read a courses "Global Studies: History and Modernity", "Human: meaning and absurdity of existence", since 1995 in various universities (Institute of Psychoanalysis, Institute of Psychology and Psychoanalysis, Moscow State Medical Stomatological University, School of Psychological Skill) he has been reading lectures on "Introduction to psychoanalysis", "History and theory of psychoanalysis", "Postclassic psychoanalysis," Psychoanalytic pedagogy and psychology", “Psychoanalysis and culture”.
He is the author-compiler of the first anthology on the history of Russian psychoanalysis – “Sigmund Freud, psychoanalysis and Russian thought" (1994) and of a series of reading books on psychoanalysis, including “Sigmund Freud. Psychoanalysis" (2001), "Foreign psychoanalysis" (2001), "Domestic psychoanalysis" (2001), "Carl Gustav Jung. Analytical psychology and psychotherapy" (2001), "Classical psychoanalysis and literary fiction" (2002), "Erich Fromm. Humanistic Psychoanalysis" (2002), "Anna Freud. Child psychoanalysis" (2003, 2004).
For distance studying of the lectures of Valery Leibin there have been prepared video materials "Introduction to psychoanalysis" (Moscow, 1999, video 215 min.), "Fundamentals of psychoanalysis (Moscow, Center of promotion of vocational education, 2007, 2 DVDs – 24 video hours), "Psychoanalysis" (Chelyabinsk, 2008, 2 DVDs), "Lectures on psychoanalysis. Sexual life of man and the Oedipus complex" (Chelyabinsk, 2009, 3 DVDs).

== Publications ==
Valery Leibin is author of more than 30 monographs and over 400 articles, chapters in collective works, reviews and book reviews, published in Russian and foreign magazines, such as «The Psychoanalytic Review», «Behavioral and Brain Sciences», «Individual Psychology. The Journal of Adlerian Theory, Research and Practicе», «The International Journal of Individual Psychology and Comparative Studies», «Gesellschafts wissenschaftliche Beitrage». The works by Valery Leibin have been published in English, Arab, Bulgarian, Hungarian, Spanish, Italian, German, Portuguese, Czech, French.

=== Monographs on psychoanalysis ===
1. Psychoanalysis and philosophy of neofreudism. Moscow, Politizdat, 1977. – 246 p.
2. Freud, psychoanalysis and modern western philosophy. Moscow, Politizdat, 1990. – 397 p.
3. Russianness of Freud. Moscow, "MGU", 1994. – 80 p.
4. Oedipus complex and the Russian mentality. Moscow, "URSS", 1998. – 59 p.
5. Psychoanalytic literature in Russia. Moscow, "Flint", 1998. – 144 p.
6. Anthology of Russian psychoanalysis. Moscow, "Flint", 1999. Book I - 848 p.; Book II - 863 p. (Co-author - V.I. Ovcharenko).
7. Oedipus complex: incest and parricide. Moscow – Voronezh, "MODEK", 2000. – 431 p.
8. Sigmund Freud and psychoanalysis in Russia: Freud S. Works on psychoanalysis; Leibin V. Freud and Russia. Moscow – Voronezh, "MODEK", 2000. – 528 p.
9. Classic psychoanalysis: history, theory, practice. Moscow – Voronezh, "MODEK", 2001. – 1056 p.
10. Reference Dictionary of psychoanalysis. Saint-Petersburg, "Piter", 2001. – 688 p.
11. Psychoanalysis. Textbook. Saint-Petersburg, "Piter", 2002. – 576 p.
12. The first psychoanalysts: conceptual and therapeutic research. Moscow, Publisher "Institute of Psychoanalysis", 2003. – 92 p.
13. Sigmund Freud: psychopoetic portrait. Moscow, Publisher "Moscow Psychological and Social Institute", 2006. — 368 p.
14. Postclassic psychoanalysis. Encyclopedia. Moscow, "Territory of the Future”, 2006. Book 1 — 472 p.; Book 2 — 568 p.
15. Psychoanalysis: problems, research, discussions. Moscow, "Canon+", 2008. – 768 p.
16. Sabina Spielrein: Between a hammer and an anvil. Moscow, “Kogito-Centre", 2008. – 318 p.
17. Psychoanalysis. Textbook. 2nd ed. Saint-Petersburg, "Piter", 2008. – 592 p.
18. Postclassic Psychoanalysis: Encyclopedia. – Moscow, "AST", 2009. - 1022[2] p.
19. Diary of a father. Moscow, “Kogito-Centre", 2010. – 128 p.
20. Reference Dictionary of psychoanalysis. Moscow, "AST", 2010. - 956 p.

== Works ==
Father of three children, in 1985, together with his wife Galina Lytkina, Valery Leibin created a family Puppet Theatre "FANI", focused on education, training, and teaching foreign languages, as well as therapeutic work with children and adults.

=== Collected poems ===
- Psihoanalizmy. Moscow, "Golden Calf", 2004. – 160 p.
- Love and time. Moscow, "Golden Calf", 2005. – 192 p.
- Signs of time. Moscow, "Golden Calf", 2005. – 240 p.
- Smehograd. Moscow, “Canon +", 2008. – 480 p.
- Eros of life. Moscow, "Teler”, 2009. – 182 p.

== Awards ==
Honorary Diploma of the committee organization of the conference "Sigmund Freud and psychoanalysis in the context of Austrian and Russian cultures" (2000), Honorary Doctor Diploma of the Eastern European Institute of Psychoanalysis (2002), Diploma of the publishing house "Piter" in the nomination "For variety of genres of published works and contribution to the study of psychoanalytic theory and practice in Russia” at the Moscow International Book Fair (2002).

== Criticism of Valery Leibin’s activities ==
O.E. Akimov at www.humans.ru had published a critical article entitled "Leibin, Freud and Russia. "Non-Russianness" of psychoanalysis". In this article the author accuses Valery Leibin of having caused enormous damage to Russia by "taking up the promotion of contentious teachings of Freud", by “doing everything for the ideology of Freudianism to become the official ideology of Russia" and by "being a brilliant propagandist; Hitler would have remained satisfied with his work". Akimov believes psychoanalysis harmful and dangerous, calls Sigmund Freud "the father of shamanism of the 20th century", a clever adventurer". One of the author's claims against Valery Leibin is that he introduced the concept of "Russianness", widely used by Russian nationalists now. Also O.E. Akimov, while calling Valery Leibin "a prominent figure in the psychoanalytic world”, "the greatest expert in the field of theory, practice and history of psychoanalysis”, "the leading psychotherapist”, accuses the latter in causing psychological trauma to his students.
