= Victor Ovcharenko =

Russian academician in sociology, philosopher and historian

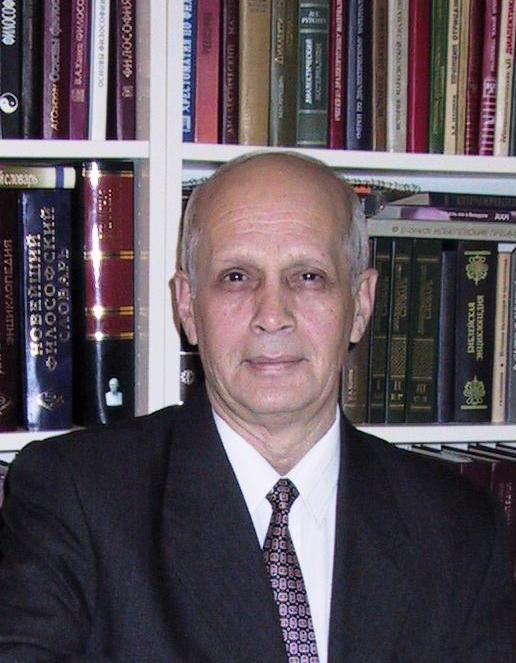
Victor Ovcharenko

Victor Ovcharenko (Russian: Ви́ктор Ива́нович Овчаре́нко; February 5, 1943 – May 5, 2009) was a Russian philosopher, sociologist, historian and psychologist. He also was a PhD., professor, academician of the Russian Academy of Natural Sciences (1997), academician of the Academy for Humanities Research (1998) and academician of the Academy of Pedagogical and Social Sciences (2000). He co-edited the journals The Psychoanalytical Bulletin, The Bulletin of Psychoanalysis, etc. He was a forerunner (with V.S. Stepin) of the Minsk philosophical school "Humanities Encyclopedia". He is considered one of the founders of modern Belarusian sociology.

== Biography ==
In 1969 he graduated from the historical department of the Belarusian State University (BSU). After finishing post-graduate study at the chair of philosophy of BSU he wrote his doctoral thesis Critical analysis of the personality theory of Freud's psychoanalytical system (1973, BSU). From 1972 to 1982 he worked as a lecturer, a senior lecturer, and an assistant professor of the chair of philosophy at the BSU.

In 1982-1983 he was an assistant professor of the chair of philosophy at the Refresher Institute for Lectures of Social Sciences of the BSU. From 1983-1987 he worked as an assistant professor of the chair of philosophy at the Refresher Institute for Lecturers of Social Sciences of Moscow State University, named after M.V. Lomonosov.

In 1987 he was an assistant professor and later a professor (1995) of the chair of philosophy at Moscow State Linguistic University. His doctoral thesis was Genesis, Foundations, Forms and Tendencies of Sociological Psychologism Development as a Phenomenon of Social Thought (1995, MSU).

== Scientific achievements ==
The scientific achievements of V. Ocharenko connect sociological psychologism, the problems of personality and interpersonal relations, the contents and models of mind; history, the theory and methodology of psychoanalysis and post-freudism, the human dimensions of world history, alienation and humanism, the history of philosophy, sociology and psychology; metaphilosophy and methods of teaching philosophy.

He proved that the creation of the Western and Eastern versions of conceptual humanism were one of the first socially significant results of systematic philosophical activity in the Ancient world.

He researched paradigms and trends of classical and modern social thought. In 1990 he elaborated the foundations of the sociological psychologism— "concept that regards action and interaction of social, group and individual psychical factors as a premise of research and explanation of social phenomena and processes" .

In 1993 V. Ovcharenko initiated the campaign to return original documents and materials about the history of the Russian Psychoanalytical movement to Russia.

In 1994 he published the Psychoanalytical Glossary — the first Russian language edition of a dictionary and reference book on psychoanalysis that presented systematized data on the history of psychoanalysis, its ideas and leaders, terminology, founding documents, classical and modern schools and theories. He has marked out three principal stages in the development of classical psychoanalysis: 1) Clinical (1896—1905), 2) Psychological (1905—1913) and 3) Metaphysical (1913—1939).

In 1996 V. Ovcharenko worked out the first historical periods of the Russian psychoanalysis and psychoanalytical movement. With Russian psychoanalyst Valery Leibin, he published The Anthology of Russian Psychoanalysis (in two volumes) describing the first century of Russian psychoanalytical ideas.

V. Ovcharenko introduced the categories of "sociological psychologism", "conceptual problematic complex", "conceptual problematic associations", "latent and contact world history", "dispersed rational sphere", "dispersed psychoanalytical sphere", "multibasisness of a person", etc. He published about 1500 articles in different countries. These include more than 700 biographies of philosophers, sociologists, psychologists and psychoanalysts. He also wrote articles in Russian and foreign journals, encyclopedias and dictionaries.

== Main works ==
- "Psychoanalytical Glossary" (1994)
- "Sociological Psychologism. Critical Analysis" (1990, with A.A. Gritsanov)
- "The Man and Alienation" (1991, with A.A. Gritsanov)
- "The History of Sociology" (1993, 1997, co-author)
- "Philosophical and Social Anthropology" (1997, co-author)
- "Psychoanalytical Literature in Russia" (1998, with V.M.Leibin)
- "Psychoanalysis. Popular Encyclopedia" (1998, co-author)
- "The Anthology of Russian Psychoanalysis" (1999, in two volumes, with V.M.Leibin)
- "The Newest Philosophical Dictionary" (1999, 2001, co-author)
- "Modern Western Philosophy" (2000, co-author)
- "Russian Psychoanalysts" (2000)
- "Classical and Modern Psychoanalysis" (2000)
- "The World Encyclopedia. Philosophy" (2000, co-author)
- "Postmodernism. Encyclopedia" (2001, co-author)
- "The History of Philosophy. Encyclopedia" (2002, co-author)
- "The World Encyclopedia. Philosophy of the 21st Century" (2002, co-author)
- "The English-Russian Psychoanalytical Dictionary" (2003, in two volumes)
- "The Newest Philosophical Dictionary" (2003, co-author)
- "Sociology. Encyclopedia" (2003, co-author)
- "The History of Psychology" (2005, co-author)
- "Summa Psychoanalitica" (2006, in nineteen volumes)
- "Clinical Psychology. Dictionary" (2007, co-author)
- "The Bolshevist Philosophy" (2008, in three volumes)
- "Psychoanalysis. The Newest Encyclopedia" (2009, editor-in-chief)

== Selected articles ==
- Ovcharenko V.I. Under the Badge of Destruction
- Ovcharenko V.I. The History of the Russian Psychoanalysis and Problems of Its Periodization
- Ovcharenko V.I. Psychoanalytical Anthropology
- Ovcharenko V.I. Realization of the Unconscious
- Ovcharenko V.I. Status and Authenticity of Psychoanalysis
- Ovcharenko V.I. Intentions and Prospects of the Russian Psychoanalysis
- Ovcharenko V.I. Multibasisness of a Person
