= Karen Karagezyan =

Soviet and Russian journalist

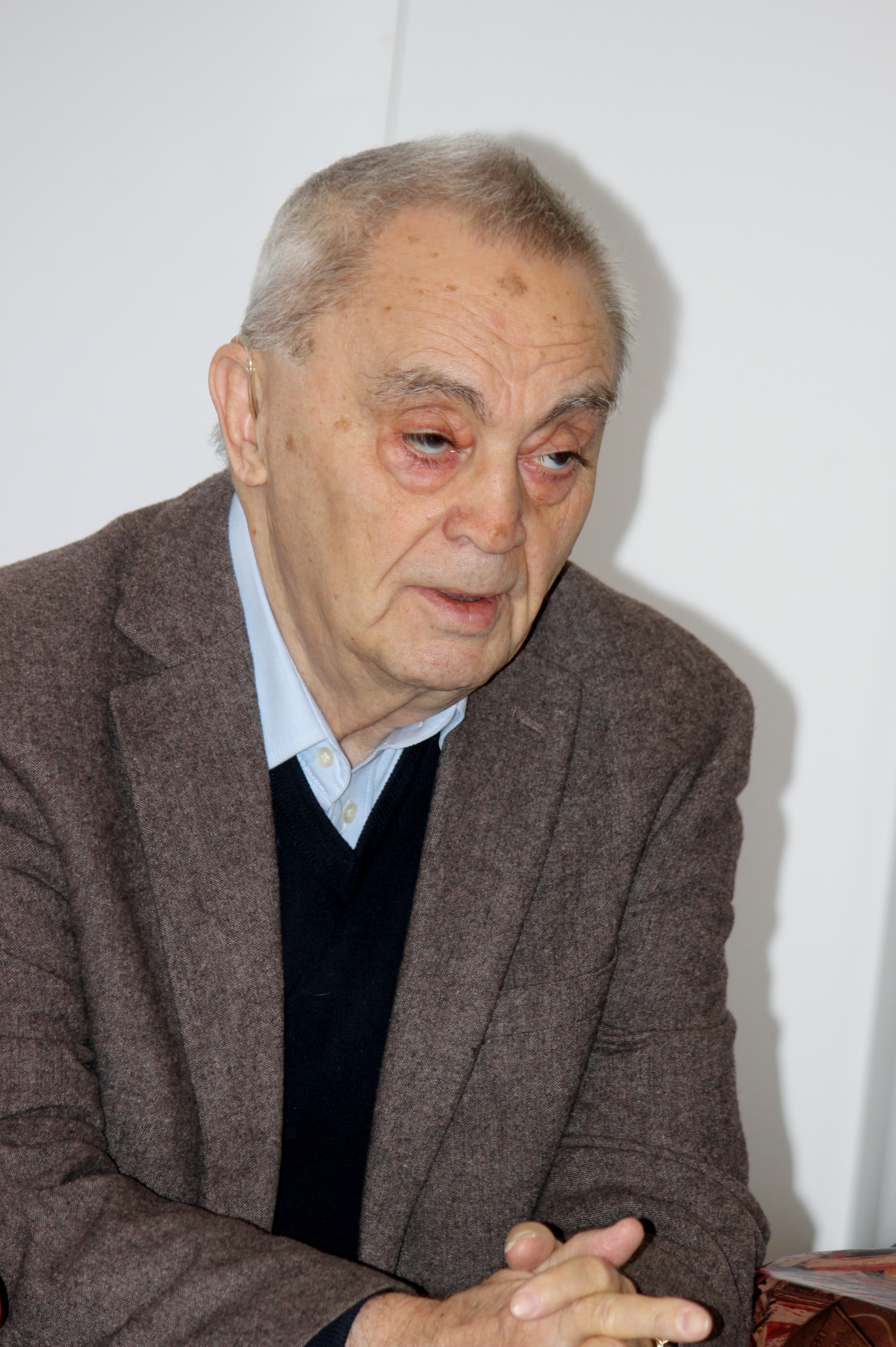
- Karagezyan in 2018
- Born: Karen Karovich Karagezyan; October 6, 1935; Moscow, Russian SFSR, USSR
- Died: February 25, 2025 (aged 89); Moscow, Russia
- Occupations: Journalist, translator, writer

Karen Karovich Karagezyan (Russian: Карен Карович Карагезьян ; October 6, 1935 – February 25, 2025) was a Soviet and Russian journalist, translator and writer who was the deputy head of the press office at The Gorbachev Foundation. In different years he was the press secretary, advisor and assistant of Mikhail Gorbachev.

== Life and career ==
Karagezyan was born on October 6, 1935, in Moscow. In 1953, after leaving the secondary school # 557 he entered the faculty of translation at the first Moscow state pedagogical institute of foreign languages. His speciality was a teacher and a translator of German.

He worked as a teacher at that institute for four years and later worked as a professional translator at the Institute of Social Sciences in Moscow.

In 1959–1960, he studied as an exchange student at Heidelberg University, the Department of German Studies.

In 1964, he began to work as a journalist. He was the editor, observer, head of the department of European countries, an editorial board member of the weekly magazine Za rubezhom.

In 1977, he began to work for the political weekly the New Times. He was sent to Bonn as a correspondent where he worked until 1982. In 1982, he returned to Moscow where he continued his work as an observer for the New Times.

In 1983, he was invited to work for a newly formed department of international information at the Central Committee of the Communist Party of the Soviet Union which was part of the Ideological Department.

In the early 1991, he was accepted for employment at the Press Service of the President of the USSR in the Kremlin.

From February 1992, he worked for the Service of International Contacts and Contacts with the Press at the International Foundation for Socio-Economic and Political Studies (The Gorbachev Foundation). He was engaged in the Foundation's contacts with German partners and accompanied the President of the Foundation in his trips to Germany.

He was a counselor of the chairman of the coordination committee of the forum of civil societies of Russia and Germany "Petersburg's dialogue".

In 2006, he took part in the round table discussion "The breakup of the Soviet Union: reasons and consequences" within the framework of "The Gorbachev Readings".

He authored books and publications in Russian and foreign mass media. In 2016, together with Vladimir Polyakov he published a book "Gorbachev in life".

In October 2019, he became an invited guest-expert in the filming of the documentary Star of Raisa, dedicated to Raisa Gorbachev. He died in Moscow on February 25, 2025, at the age of 89.

== Bibliography ==
- Karagezyan K.K. The 25th anniversary of the republic // Sputnik Publ., 1974. – p. 17 (in Russian).
- Karagezyan K.K. Revanchism – an illusion or a real threat. – Moscow: Agenstvo pechati “Novosti” Publ., 1984. – 56 p. (in Russian).
- Karagezyan K.K., Polyakov V.A. Gorbachev in life. – Moscow: Ves Mir Publ., 2016. – 726 p. (in Russian).
- Karagezyan K.K., Polyakov V.A. Gorbachev in life.2nd edition. – Moscow: Ves Mir Publ., 2017. – 751 p. (in Russian).
