= Georgy Shakhnazarov =

Soviet politician and political scientist (1924–2001)

Personal details
- Born: October 4, 1924 Baku, Azerbaijan SSR, Transcaucasian SFSR, Soviet Union
- Died: May 15, 2001 (aged 76) Tula, Russia
- Occupation: politician and political scientist

Georgy Khosroevich Shakhnazarov (Armenian: Գեորգի Շահնազարով; October 4, 1924 in Baku, Azerbaijan SSR, Transcaucasian SFSR, Soviet Union – May 15, 2001, in Tula, Russia) was a Soviet politician and political scientist. He was one of the half-dozen aides closest to Mikhail Gorbachev while he was Soviet leader and after his fall from power at the collapse of the Soviet Union. Shakhnazarov was an early advocate of reform and helped Gorbachev to shape his plans to open up the system to new ideas and freedoms, but, like his boss, he failed to articulate a clear vision of where he believed the country should go.

After Gorbachev was ousted by Boris Yeltsin, Shakhnazarov became a key figure in the newly established Gorbachev Foundation.

His loyalty to Gorbachev was unquestioned, and he was with him at many of the critical moments as Soviet leader. He was at Gorbachev's side during the strained meeting in East Berlin in October 1989 to help convince the East German Politbüro to reform. The two shared a celebratory private glass of champagne when Gorbachev was elected the first (and last) Soviet president in March 1990.

Shakhnazarov was staying at a sanatorium close to the presidential dacha at Foros in the Crimea during August 1991, when he helped Gorbachev in his plans for a new Union Treaty to define relations between the republics. The two spoke by telephone about the Treaty on the afternoon of 18 August, the last call Gorbachev took before the coup plotters moved in and cut off his contact with the outside world.

Shakhnazarov (the Russified form of Shakhnazaryan) was born into the then large Armenian community in the Azerbaijani capital, Baku. He fought with the Red Army against the Nazis in World War II in Ukraine, Belarus and Lithuania. He graduated from the law faculty of Azerbaijan State University in 1949, and earned a doctorate in political science and philosophy at the Moscow Institute of Law in 1969. From 1952 to 1961 he was an editor at the publisher Politizdat, where he began writing books (one of his first was Burzhuaznoe gosudartsvo v epokhu imperializma (The Bourgeois State in an Age of Imperialism), 1955).

In the 1960s and 1970s he spent two spells at the international Communist magazine Problems of Peace and Socialism, based in Prague, giving him a wider perspective on the world than many of his colleagues in the Party establishment.

His political career in the Central Committee's International Department—which he joined in the early 1960s—was promoted by Fyodor Burlatsky, a member of the Socialist Countries Department who had the ear of Yuri Andropov. In March 1988, he was plucked from the department by Gorbachev to be a full-time adviser. At the same time he was building a parallel career as a political scientist and contributed to the professionalisation of the field in the later Soviet era. In 1975, he became president of the Soviet Association of Political Sciences (until 1991), and vice-president of the International Political Science Association (until 1988).

In published works he recognised that Soviet society had different interest groups—an implicit rejection of a homogenised, communist society—and advocated a greater flow of information at a time of paranoid secrecy. He also publicly rejected the use of nuclear weapons to achieve political goals.

A member of the USSR Academy of Sciences, he was elected on the Academy's list to the first semi-free Soviet parliament, the USSR Congress of People's Deputies, when it was inaugurated in 1989. He was a member of the commission to draw up a new Soviet constitution.

Shakhnazarov wrote up his memoirs of the Gorbachev years as Tsena svobody: reformatsiia Gorbacheva glazami ego pomoshchnika (The Price of Freedom: Gorbachev's Reformation through the Eyes of His Aide, 1993). He was also the author of science fiction and plays. His son, Karen Shakhnazarov, born in 1952, is a noted film director.

More radical than Gorbachev, Shakhnazarov contributed to the destruction of the system of which he had been a member, working tactically to abolish such anachronisms as the Communist Party monopoly on power. "As often happens in revolutionary situations," he later recalled, "there are things which seem banal today but which you couldn't even mention then."

== Awards ==
- Order of the October Revolution
- Two Order of the Patriotic War 2nd class (02.03.1945, 06.04.1985)
- Two Order of the Red Banner of Labour
- Order of Friendship of Peoples
- Order of the Red Star (23.04.1944)
- Medal "For the Victory over Germany in the Great Patriotic War 1941–1945"
- Medal of Zhukov
- Medal "For the Capture of Königsberg"
- Medal "Veteran of Labour"
- USSR State Prize (1980)

== Books online in English ==
- Socialism and Equality (1961)
- The Role of the Communist Party in Socialist Society (1974)
- Socialist Democracy: Aspects of Theory (1974)
- The Destiny of the World: The Socialist Shape of Things to Come (1979)
- Futurology Fiasco: A Critical Study of Non-Marxist Concepts of How Society Develops (1982)
