= Kurdish Language Day =

Kurdish event

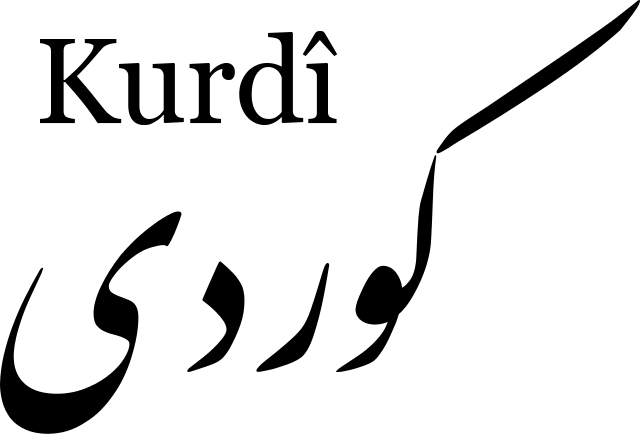

Kurdish Language day (Sorani Kurdish: ڕۆژی زمانی کوردی, romanized: Řojî Zimanî Kurdî, Kurmanji Kurdish: Roja Zimanê Kurdî) May 15 is the Kurdish Language Day. On this day in 1932 the first issue of Hawar was published by Celadet Alî Bedirxan in Damascus, Syria. Hawar Literature Magazine played a crucial role in the development of the Kurdish language and culture. Around 2006-2007 the Kurdistan National Congress designated May 15 as the official Kurdish language day marking the publication of the first issue of the Hawar Literature Magazine in 1932.

== See also ==
- Kurdish Language
- Celadet Alî Bedirxan
- Hawar Literature Magazine
