= Lyubov Speranskaya =

Russian painter

Lyubov Lvovna Speranskaya (1918–2010; Russian: Сперанская Любовь Львовна nee Stein) was a People's Artist of the Republic of Tatarstan, a member of the Russian Artist's Union, the first female scenographer in Tatarstan, a theatre artist, a portraitist, a graphic painter, a ceramist, an ethnographer, and a participant in World War II.

Living in Leningrad (today Saint-Petersburg) in 1941, she finished Leningrad State University and was then mobilized for the children's evacuation from besieged Leningrad. She worked as a tutor until 1944 in a remote village in the Sarmanovsky District of the Republic of Tatarstan. There, she discovered Tatar art. The singularity and charm of Tatar art fascinated her for years, especially the origin of some elements of the art, the character of national clothes, and utensils.

She spent many years of work in museum fonds in Kazan, Volga region, and other cities. In 1972, after 25 years of work, she published the Kostyumi Kazanskikh Tatar (National Clothes of the Kazan Tatars), an illustrated history book. It is considered a premier work in this field.

At the same time as began to work as an artist in TGTO&B, she became a follower of Pyotr Tikhonovich Speranski, a scenographer and the creator of Tatar national decorative art. She would later marry him. She finished Art College in 1953. The first playbill containing her name appeared in 1946. From 1953 to 1957, Speranskaya worked as chief artist in Kazan Dolls Theatre. After 1957, she worked as a stage-art director in Kazan theatres, and she was invited to other cities of the Russian Federation (Ijevsk, Chelyabinsk, Cheboksary, Yoshkar-Ola, Siktivkar, Petrozavodsk, Moscow, etc.). She worked on more than 100 theatre productions. She became famous as a scenographic producer and master of scenic and national clothes.

Her theatre and scenic costumes as a rule turn to character with its own psychology, national characteristics and spirit of the time. Speranskaya was a constant participant in different theatre art exhibitions in Tatarstan, Russia, the former Soviet Union and international exhibitions. She has a diploma for participation in the Russian Exhibition Bolshaya Volga (The Great Volga).
