= Kurdish language =

Northwestern Iranian dialect continuum

Kurdish
- Kurdî, کوردی
- Native to: Armenia, Azerbaijan, Iran, Iraq, Syria, Turkey
- Region: Kurdistan; Also Anatolia, Caucasus, Khorasan, Kurdish diaspora
- Ethnicity: Kurds
- Native speakers: 29 million (2017–2024)
- Language family: Indo-European: Indo-Iranian; Iranian; Western; Northwestern; Kurdish
- Dialects: Northern Kurdish (Kurmanji); Central Kurdish (Sorani); Southern Kurdish (Xwarîn, Palewani); Laki
- Writing system: Hawar alphabet (Latin script; used mostly in Turkey and Syria); Sorani alphabet (Perso-Arabic script; used mostly in Iraq and Iran); Cyrillic alphabet (former Soviet Union); Armenian alphabet (1921–29 in Soviet Armenia)

Official status
- Official language in: Iraq (Note: Official at state level); Kurdistan Region
- Recognised minority language in: Armenia; Syria (Note: Recognized as a national language)

Language codes
- ISO 639-1: ku
- ISO 639-2: kur
- ISO 639-3: kur – inclusive code Individual codes: kmr – Northern Kurdish ckb – Central Kurdish sdh – Southern Kurdish lki – Laki Kurdish
- Glottolog: kurd1259
- Linguasphere: 58-AAA-a
Geographic distribution of Kurdish dialects and other Iranian languages spoken by Kurds
Kurmanji (Northern Kurdish)
Sorani (Central Kurdish)
Xwarin (Southern Kurdish) and Laki
Zazaki and Gorani
Mixed dialect areas

Kurdish (Kurdî, کوردی, pronounced [kʊrdiː]) is a Northwestern Iranian language or group of languages spoken by Kurds in the region of Kurdistan, namely in southeast Turkey, northern Iraq, northwest Iran, and northern Syria. It is also spoken in northeast Iran, as well as in certain areas of Armenia and Azerbaijan.

Kurdish varieties constitute a dialect continuum except for Zaza, with some mutually unintelligible varieties, and collectively have 29 million native speakers. The main varieties of Kurdish are Kurmanji, Sorani, and Southern Kurdish (Xwarîn). The majority of the Kurds speak Kurmanji, and most Kurdish texts are written in Kurmanji and Sorani. Kurmanji in Turkey is written in the Hawar alphabet, a derivation of the Latin script, and Sorani is written in the Sorani alphabet, a derivation of the Arabic script.

A separate group of non-Kurdish Northwestern Iranian languages, the Zaza–Gorani languages, are also spoken by several million ethnic Kurds.

The literary output in Kurdish was mostly confined to poetry until the early 20th century, when more general literature became developed. Today, the two principal written Kurdish dialects are Kurmanji and Sorani. Sorani is, along with Arabic, one of the two official languages of Iraq and is in political documents simply referred to as "Kurdish".

== Classification and origin ==
The Kurdish varieties belong to the Iranian branch of the Indo-European family. They are generally classified as Northwestern Iranian languages, or by some scholars as intermediate between Northwestern and Southwestern Iranian. Martin van Bruinessen notes that "Kurdish has a strong South-Western Iranian element", whereas "Zaza and Gurani [...] do belong to the north-west Iranian group".

Ludwig Paul concludes that Kurdish seems to be a Northwestern Iranian language in origin, but acknowledges that it shares many traits with Southwestern Iranian languages like Persian, apparently due to longstanding and intense historical contacts.

Windfuhr identified Kurdish dialects as Parthian, albeit with a Median substratum. Windfuhr and Frye assume an eastern origin for Kurdish and consider it as related to eastern and central Iranian dialects. Vladimir Minorsky regarded Kurdish as a descendant of the Median language, describing it as an "ancient and powerful basic language." He argued that this origin explains why the fundamental structural and lexical characteristics of Kurdish are preserved in all dialects despite their wide geographical distribution, reflecting a shared historical foundation.

The present state of knowledge about Kurdish allows, at least roughly, drawing the approximate borders of the areas where the main ethnic core of the speakers of the contemporary Kurdish dialects was formed. The most argued hypothesis on the localisation of the ethnic territory of the Kurds remains D.N. Mackenzie's theory, proposed in the early 1960s (Mackenzie 1961). Developing the ideas of P. Tedesco (1921: 255) and regarding the common phonetic isoglosses shared by Kurdish, Persian, and Baluchi, Mackenzie concluded that the speakers of these three languages may once have been in closer contact.

== Varieties ==
Kurdish varieties are divided into three or four groups, with varying degrees of mutual intelligibility.

- Kurmanji is the largest dialect group, spoken by an estimated 15 to 20 million Kurds in Turkey, Syria, northern Iraq, and northwest and northeast Iran.
- Sorani is spoken by an estimated 6 to 7 million Kurds in much of Iraqi Kurdistan and the Iranian Kurdistan province.
- Southern Kurdish (Pehlewani) is spoken in the Kermanshah, Ilam and Lorestan provinces of Iran and in the Khanaqin District of eastern Iraq. Laki and Kordali (Palai) are often included in Southern Kurdish, but they have some distinct features.

In historical evolution terms, Kurmanji is less modified than Sorani and Pehlewani in both phonetic and morphological structure. The Sorani group has been influenced by among other things its closer cultural proximity to the other languages spoken by Kurds in the region including the Gorani language in parts of Iranian Kurdistan and Iraqi Kurdistan.

Philip G. Kreyenbroek, an expert writing in 1992, says:

Since 1932 most Kurds have used the Roman script to write Kurmanji.... Sorani is normally written in an adapted form of the Arabic script.... Reasons for describing Kurmanji and Sorani as 'dialects' of one language are their common origin and the fact that this usage reflects the sense of ethnic identity and unity among the Kurds. From a linguistic or at least a grammatical point of view, however, Kurmanji and Sorani differ as much from each other as English and German, and it would seem appropriate to refer to them as languages. For example, Sorani has neither gender nor case-endings, whereas Kurmanji has both.... Differences in vocabulary and pronunciation are not as great as between German and English, but they are still considerable.

According to Encyclopaedia of Islam, although Kurdish is not a unified language, its many dialects are interrelated and at the same time distinguishable from other Western Iranian languages. The same source classifies different Kurdish dialects as two main groups, northern and central. The average Kurmanji speaker does not find it easy to communicate with the inhabitants of Sulaymaniyah or Halabja.

The Mokriani variety of Sorani is widely spoken in Mokrian. Piranshahr and Mahabad are two principal cities of the Mokrian area.

== Zazaki and Gorani ==
Zaza–Gorani languages, which are spoken by communities in the wider area who identify as ethnic Kurds, are not linguistically classified as Kurdish. Zaza-Gorani is classified as adjunct to Kurdish, although authorities differ in the details. Windfuhr (2009:589) groups Kurdish with Zaza Gorani within a "Northwestern I" group, while Glottolog based on Encyclopædia Iranica prefers an areal grouping of "Central dialects" (or "Kermanic") within Northwest Iranic, with Kurdish but not Zaza-Gorani grouped with "Kermanic".

Gorani is distinct from Northern and Central Kurdish, yet shares vocabulary with both of them and there are some grammatical similarities with Central Kurdish. The Hawrami dialects of Gorani includes a variety that was an important literary language since the 14th century, but it was replaced by Central Kurdish in the 20th century.

European scholars have maintained that Gorani is separate from Kurdish and that Kurdish is synonymous with the Northern Kurdish group, whereas ethnic Kurds maintain that Kurdish encompasses any of the unique languages or dialects spoken by Kurds that are not spoken by neighbouring ethnic groups.

Gorani is classified as part of the Zaza–Gorani branch of Indo-Iranian languages. The Zaza language, spoken mainly in Turkey, differs both grammatically and in vocabulary and is generally not understandable by Gorani speakers but it is considered related to Gorani. Almost all Zaza-speaking communities, as well as speakers of the closely related Shabaki dialect spoken in parts of Iraqi Kurdistan, identify themselves as ethnic Kurds.

Geoffrey Haig and Ergin Öpengin in their recent study suggest grouping the Kurdish languages into Northern Kurdish, Central Kurdish, Southern Kurdish, Zaza, and Gorani, and avoid the subgrouping Zaza–Gorani.

Professor Zare Yusupova has carried out much work and research into the Gorani dialect (as well as many other minority/ancient Kurdish dialects).

== History ==
During his stay in Damascus, historian Ibn Wahshiyya came across two books on agriculture written in Kurdish, one on the culture of the vine and the palm tree, and the other on water and the means of finding it out in unknown ground. He translated both from Kurdish into Arabic in the early 9th century AD.

In the 12th century, the botanist and geographer Muhammad al-Idrisi (d. 1165), working at the Norman court in Sicily, compiled an Arabic pharmacological treatise listing plants and simple drugs alphabetically with equivalent names in several languages, including Kurdish. Its surviving manuscript contains 34 Kurdish terms.

Among the earliest Kurdish religious texts is the Yazidi Black Book, the sacred book of Yazidi faith. It is considered to have been authored sometime in the 13th century by Sheikh Hasan ibn Sheikh Adi II (b. 1195), the great-grandnephew of Sheikh Adi ibn Musafir (d. 1162), the founder of the faith. It contains the Yazidi account of the creation of the world, the origin of man, the story of Adam and Eve and the major prohibitions of the faith. According to The Cambridge History of the Kurds, "the first proper 'text'" written in Kurdish is a short Christian prayer. It was written in Armenian characters, and dates from the fifteenth century. From the 15th to 17th centuries, classical Kurdish poets and writers developed a literary language. The most notable classical Kurdish poets from this period were Ali Hariri, Ahmad Khani, Malaye Jaziri and Faqi Tayran.

The Italian priest Maurizio Garzoni published the first Kurdish grammar titled Grammatica e Vocabolario della Lingua Kurda in Rome in 1787 after eighteen years of missionary work among the Kurds of Amadiya. This work is very important in Kurdish history as it is the first acknowledgment of the widespread use of a distinctive Kurdish language. Garzoni was given the title Father of Kurdology by later scholars. The Kurdish language was banned in a large portion of Kurdistan for some time. After the 1980 Turkish coup d'état until 1991 the use of the Kurdish language was illegal in Turkey.

== Current status ==
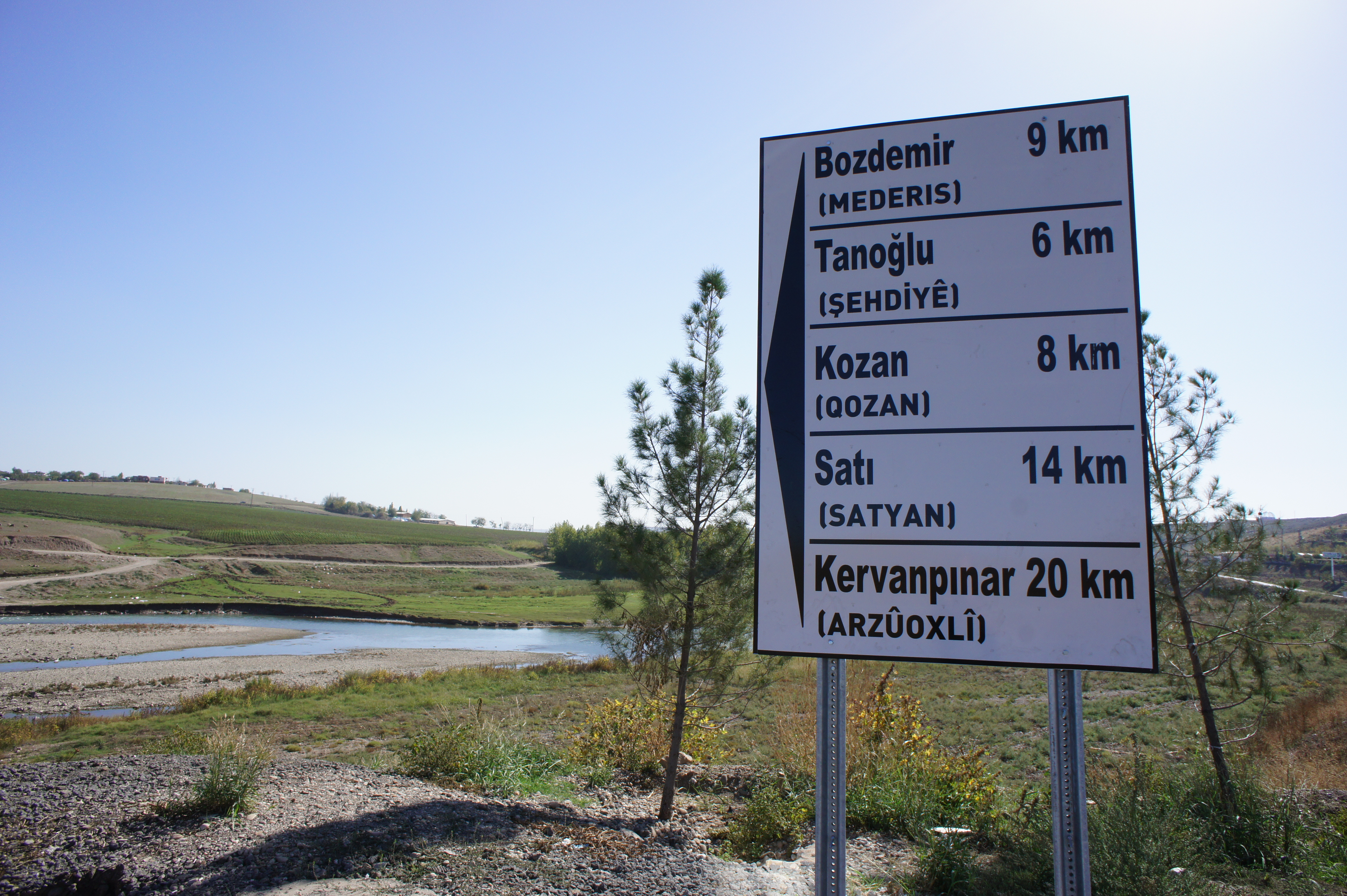
Road signs near Diyarbakır showing the place names in Turkish and Kurdish

Today, Sorani is an official language in Iraq, and Kurmanji is a recognized national language in Syria. Prior to the Fall of the Assad regime, publishing materials in Kurdish was forbidden in Syria, although this prohibition was not enforced since the Syrian civil war.

Before August 2002, the Turkish government placed severe restrictions on the use of Kurdish, prohibiting the language in education and broadcast media. In March 2006, Turkey allowed private television channels to begin airing programming in Kurdish. However, the Turkish government said that they must avoid showing children's cartoons, or educational programs that teach Kurdish, and could broadcast only for 45 minutes a day or four hours a week. The state-run Turkish Radio and Television Corporation (TRT) started its 24-hour Kurdish television station on 1 January 2009 with the motto "we live under the same sky". The Turkish prime minister sent a video message in Kurdish to the opening ceremony, which was attended by Minister of Culture and other state officials. The channel uses the X, W, and Q letters during broadcasting. However, most of these restrictions on private Kurdish television channels were relaxed in September 2009. In 2010, Kurdish municipalities in the southeast began printing marriage certificates, water bills, construction and road signs, as well as emergency, social and cultural notices in Kurdish alongside Turkish. Also Imams began to deliver Friday sermons in Kurdish and Esnaf price tags in Kurdish. Many mayors were tried for issuing public documents in Kurdish language. The Kurdish alphabet is not recognized in Turkey, and prior to 2013 the use of Kurdish names containing the letters X, W, and Q, which do not exist in the Turkish alphabet, was not allowed. In 2012, Kurdish-language lessons became an elective subject in public schools. Previously, Kurdish education had only been possible in private institutions.

In Iran, though it is used in some local media and newspapers, it is not used in public schools. In 2005, 80 Syrian and Iranian Kurds took part in an experiment and gained scholarships to study in Kurdistan Region, Iraq, in their native tongue.

In Kyrgyzstan, 96.21% of the Kurdish population speak Kurdish as their native language. In Kazakhstan, the corresponding percentage is 88.7%.

== See also ==
- Kurds
- Kurdish culture
- Kurdish literature
- Kurdish Language Day
- Kurdish Institute of Paris
- Kurdish Institute of Istanbul
- Kurdish population
