= Zare Yusupova =

Russian philologist (1934–2022)

Zare Alievna Yusupova
- Заре Алиевна Юсупова
- Born: 16 December 1934
- Died: 3 February 2022 (aged 87)
- Known for: Work on Kurdish dialects

Academic background
- Education: Doctor of Philological Sciences degree
- Alma mater: Leningrad University
- Thesis: Prepositions and postpositions in the southern dialect of the Kurdish language (sorani) (1965: Leningrad University)

Academic work
- Discipline: Languages
- Sub-discipline: Kurdish language/dialects
- Institutions: Saint Petersburg State University

Zare Alievna Yusupova (Russian: Заре Алиевна Юсупова; 16 December 1934 – 3 February 2022) was a Russian philologist specializing in the Kurdish language.

== Career ==
Yusupova held a Doctor of Philological Sciences degree and worked as a professor at the Saint Petersburg State University, where she taught Kurdish. She published more than 70 scientific works, including six monographs.

Yusupova's main fields of research were the less studied Kurdish dialects, focusing on Sorani and Hawrami (based on folklore and written materials) and the publication of the classics of the Kurdish literature.

== Later life ==
Yusupova died on 3 February 2022, at the age of 87. She died after a brief illness.
