= Alexander Raikhel =

- Education: M.S in zoology, Leningrad University (1970): Ph.D in biological sciences, Zoological Institute of the Russian Academy of Sciences (1975)
- Organization: National Academy of Sciences
- Title: Distinguished professor of entomology: Editor of Insect Biochemistry and Molecular Biology
- Spouse: Natasha Raikhel
- Awards: Entomological Society of America's Recognition Award in Insect Physiology, Biochemistry and Toxicology (2001): National Institutes of Health MERIT Award (2002)
- Website: sites.google.com/site/raikhellab/

Alexander S. Raikhel is a distinguished professor of entomology at the University of California, Riverside, and an elected member of the United States National Academy of Sciences.

== Early life and education ==
Raikhel grew up in Siberia in the Soviet Union. Raikhel was the son of two medical professionals, and was inspired by the books he read to become a scientist. He was fixated on the stereotypical image of intellectuals wearing glasses, and at one point deliberately failed a vision test so that he could wear glasses. Raikhel applied to Leningrad State University in 1965, but was delayed by the quota system due to his Jewish heritage. As a result, he cleaned pens at Leningrad Zoo and took night courses to further his education, eventually earning his master's degree in 1970. Again delayed by the quota system for Jews, Raikhel worked for Yu. S. Balashov at the Zoological Institute of the Russian Academy of Sciences during his studies; Raikhel defended his thesis about blood-feeding organisms in 1975.

== Career ==
Raikhel's travels to study ticks in warmer climates influenced him and his wife, fellow Soviet scientist Natasha Raikhel, to look for a livelihood outside the USSR. With the help of visiting University of Georgia professor Jerry Paulin, the couple emigrated to the United States in 1979 as political refugees. Under Arden O. Lea at the University of Georgia, Raikhel switched from studying ticks to mosquitoes, which led him to study vector biology. Raikhel's work focused on identifying the chemical precursors to reproduction (vitellogenesis) in Drosophila, Aedes aegypti, and Culex quinquefasciatus. His lab discovered that the female mosquito, after having a blood meal, begins producing eggs. Raikhel began work at Michigan State University in 1986 as an associate professor of entomology where he received the university's Distinguished Faculty Award. While there, his work focused on the possibility of breeding mosquitoes to internally eliminate diseases they typically pass on to the animals they feed on. In January 2002, Raikhel moved from Michigan to the University of California, Riverside, in Southern California. That year, Raikhel was named a fellow of the American Association for the Advancement of Science and also awarded a MERIT award, a ten-year US$10,000,000 (equivalent to $17,900,093 in 2025) grant to continue his mosquito research by the National Institutes of Health. In 2009 Raikhel was elected to the National Academy of Sciences in recognition of his "groundbreaking contributions to understanding mosquito physiology". The same year he was named a fellow of the Entomological Society of America. Raikhel founded and currently leads UCR's Center for Disease Vector Research. Raikhel's recent research is on identifying how to manipulate the juvenile hormones of female mosquitos to impair their ability to reproduce healthy offspring, thus reducing vectors for yellow fever, dengue fever, and chikungunya.
