= Natasha Raikhel =

American botany professor

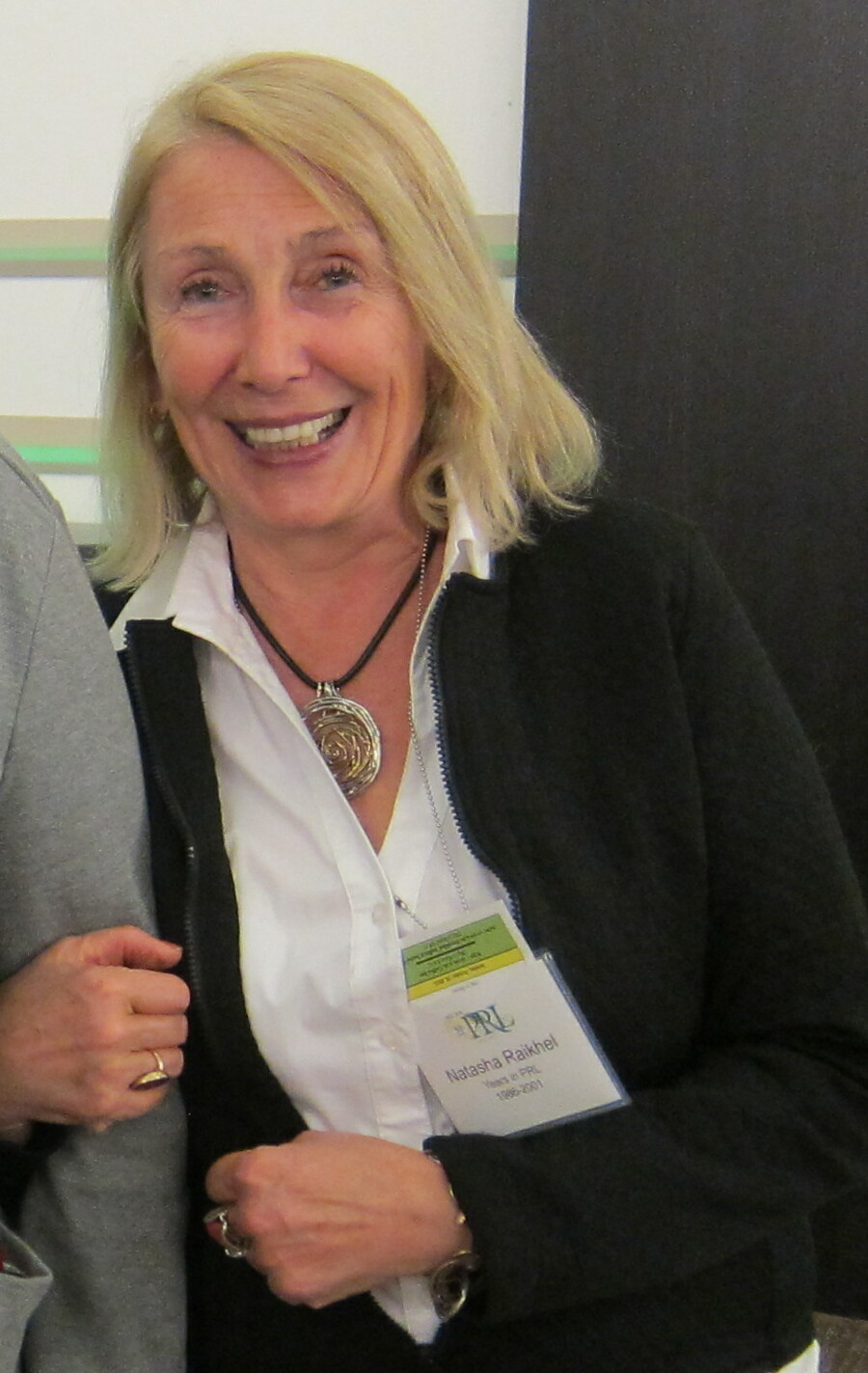
- In 2014
- Born: January 11, 1947 (age 79); Magdeburg, Germany
- Education: M.S . in Biology, Leningrad State University (1970): Ph.D. in Cell Biology, Institute of Cytology at Russian Academy of Sciences (1975)
- Occupation: Biologist
- Title: Distinguished professor of plant cell biology at UCR: Editor-in-chief, Plant Physiology (2000–2005)
- Spouse: Alexander Raikhel
- Awards: American Society of Plant Biologists Adolph E. Gude, Jr. Award (2013): American Society for Cell Biology Women in Cell Biology Senior Award (2002)
- Website: cepceb.ucr.edu/people/raikhel.html

Natasha V. Raikhel (born 1947) is a professor of plant cell biology at University of California, Riverside and a member of the National Academy of Sciences.

== Early life and education ==
Raikhel, the daughter of a surgeon and an X-Ray technician, grew up in Leningrad in the Soviet Union. From a young age, she was cultivated to become a concert pianist, until a teacher dissuaded her during her final year of high school from pursuing music as a career. After transferring to a regular high school from the music conservatory, she studied various sciences day and night, finally earning high enough scores to attend Leningrad State University to study invertebrae biology. Raiklhel graduated in 1970 with her master's degree and went on to receive her Ph.D from the Russian Academy of Sciences in 1975.

== Immigrating to America ==
In 1978, she, her husband, and their son survived a deadly plane crash—which the airline refused to acknowledge had even taken place. The incident, alongside the death of her father and regular anti-Semitic encounters, convinced the couple to take their son abroad rather than to continue to live in the Soviet Union. Due to their Jewish heritage, they obtained permission to emigrate shortly before the Soviet border closed for the last time concurrent with the Soviet invasion of Afghanistan. With the help of University of Georgia professor Jerome Paulin, who had temporarily worked alongside Raikhel in Leningrad in the late 1970s, Raikhel and her family emigrated to Rome and then to Georgia in 1979 as political refugees.

== Education career ==
Shortly after arriving Raikhel started her post-doctoral work at University of Georgia, concluding in 1984 when she was hired by the University as an assistant research scientist in their botany department. Beginning in 1986, she taught at Michigan State University's East Lansing campus as an assistant professor of botany. She was advanced to full professor in 1994. In 1996 Raikhel was awarded a Guggenheim fellowship for the study of plant sciences. She has done research related to SNARE proteins in plants, an understudied area, including Zheng et al 1999 in which she and her team found AtVTI1a to be essential to Golgi⇄vacuole trafficking. In 2001, the Raikhel family moved to University of California, Riverside (UCR) where she teaches plant cell biology. In 2012 Raikhel was elected to the National Academy of Sciences for "pioneering the use of novel genetic and biochemical techniques to elucidate the organization and function of the secretory system in plant cells." She holds the Ernst and Helen Leibacher Endowed Chair in Plant Molecular, Cell Biology & Genetics at UCR. She is the founding director of UCR's Center for Plant Cell Biology and the current director of UCR's Institute for Integrative Genome Biology.

== Personal life ==
She is an old and intimate friend of Susan R. Wessler. In 1989, she was diagnosed with breast cancer and received treatment for eight years before the cancer went into remission.

== Published works ==
- —; Smith, Harley M. S. (April 1999). "Protein Targeting to the Nuclear Pore. What Can We Learn from Plants?". Plant Physiology. 119 (4). American Society of Plant Biologists: 1157–1164. doi:10.1104/pp.119.4.1157. JSTOR 4278725. PMC 1539210. PMID 10198074.
- Raikhel, Natasha V.; Hicks, Glenn R. (June 2012). "Small Molecules Present Large Opportunities in Plant Biology". Annual Review of Plant Biology. 63: 261–282. doi:10.1146/annurev-arplant-042811-105456. PMID 22404475.
- —; Hicks, Glenn R. (September 8, 2014). "Plant chemical biology: are we meeting the promise?". Frontiers in Plant Science. 5: 455. doi:10.3389/fpls.2014.00455. PMC 4157539. PMID 25250041.
- —; Li, Ruixi; Sun, Ruobai; Hicks, Glenn R. (December 22, 2014). "Arabidopsis ribosomal proteins control vacuole trafficking and developmental programs through the regulation of lipid metabolism". Proceedings of the National Academy of Sciences. 112 (1): E89–E98. doi:10.1073/pnas.1422656112. PMC 4291620. PMID 25535344.
