= The Gorbachev Foundation =

Moscow-based non-profit organization

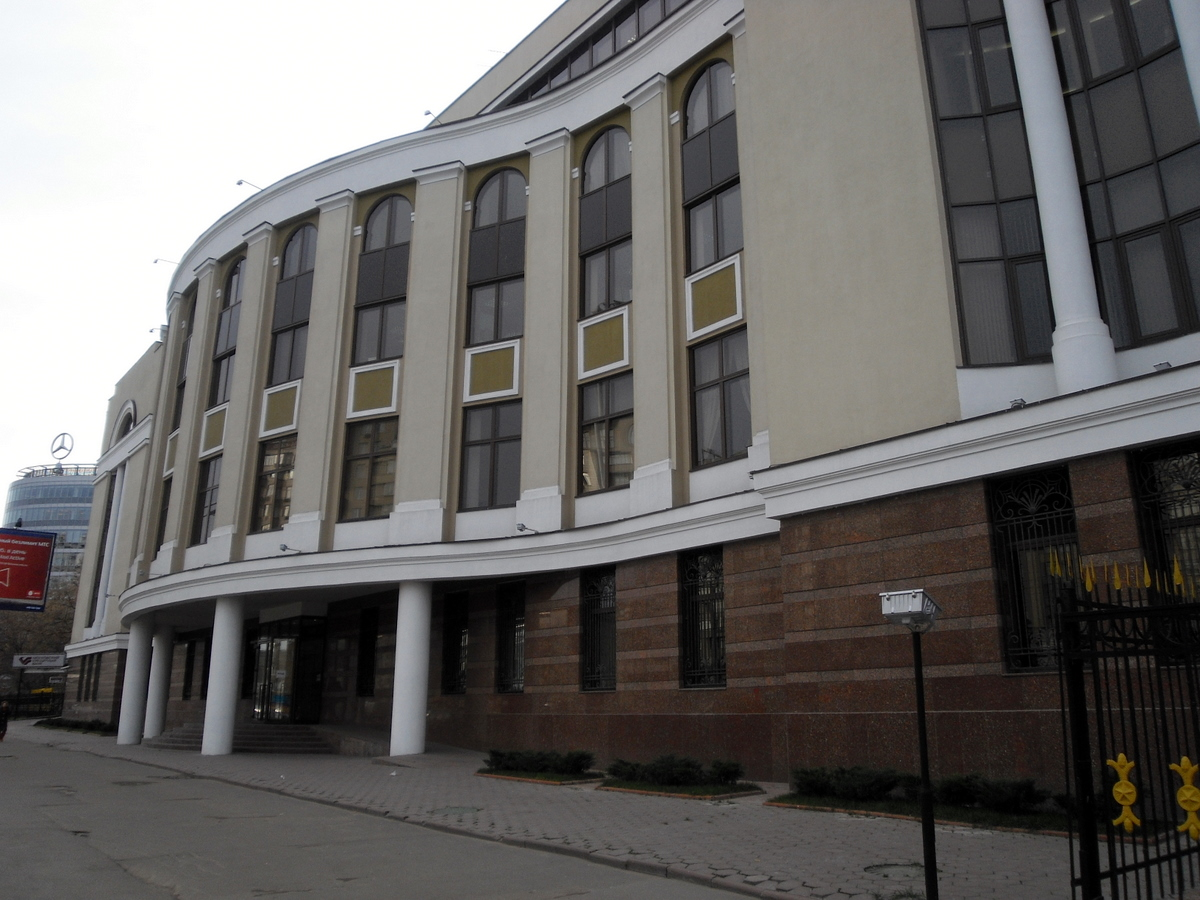
- The Gorbachev Foundation Building at Leningradsky Prospekt.
- Abbreviation: GF
- Formation: December 1991
- Type: NPO
- Legal status: foundation
- Headquarters: Moscow
- Coordinates: 55°47′48″N 37°32′19″E
- Website: gorby.ru

The Gorbachev Foundation (Note: Russian: Горбачёв-Фонд, romanized: Gorbachyov-Fond) (GF, officially the Non-Governmental Foundation for Socio-Economic and Political Studies) (Note: Russian: Некоммерческая организация международный фонд социально-экономических и политологических исследований, romanized: Nekommercheskaya organizatsiya mezhdunarodnyy fond sotsial'no-ekonomicheskikh i politologicheskikh issledovaniy) is a non-profit organization headquartered in Moscow, founded by the former Soviet leader Mikhail Gorbachev in December 1991. The foundation researches the Perestroika era, as well as Russian history and politics. It was initially financed by Gorbachev himself and by taking donations.

== History ==
After 1991, late Soviet foreign policy adviser Anatoly Chernyaev worked with the Gorbachev Foundation and also published books.

In May 1992, Gorbachev toured the United States in a two-week speaking tour as part of the foundation.

In June to October 1992, Boris Yeltsin transferred the Gorbachev Foundation's headquarters and buildings to the Russian government by decree, and assigned them to the Finance Academy, though ordered the academy to leave some rooms for Gorbachev to rent. This occurred without notice while the Gorbachev Foundation was building a library. The dispute with Gorbachev followed Yeltsin's ban on the Communist Party. After the Russian Constitutional Court requested in 1992 that Gorbachev be forbidden from leaving the country because he refused to testify in that court's trial over the banning, Gorbachev described himself as the first "refusenik of Russia".

In 1993, Gorbachev founded Green Cross International, a separate organization whose Russian national office is headquartered in the Gorbachev Foundation building.

In 1995, the foundation hosted its first event, the State of the World Forum, at the Fairmont Hotel in San Francisco, which discussed international political goals of the 21st century such as resolving differences following the Cold War. The forum included guests such as Mikhail Gorbachev, economist Milton Friedman, former U.S. national security adviser Zbigniew Brzezinski, former U.S. Secretary of State George P. Shultz, as well as former U.S. President George H.W. Bush, former British PM Margaret Thatcher, scientists Carl Sagan and Jane Goodall, broadcaster Ted Turner, billionaire David Packard, former Senator Alan Cranston, singer John Denver, and chef Wolfgang Puck, South Korean politician Kim Dae-jung, the 1992 Nobel Peace Prize winner Rigoberta Menchu, journalist Bernard Shaw, and Reagan administration US-Soviet Exchange official Stephen Rhinesmith. The conference was described and partially criticized by the book The Global Trap in 1996, written by later populist European Parliament member Hans-Peter Martin. The book noted that the idea of a "one-fifth society" was discussed, and the book, as some speakers, claimed that 20% of the population would sustain the world economy, whereas 80% would be distracted by what Zbigniew Brzezinski criticized and purportedly called "tittytainment" a mindless form of entertainment.

The first World Summit of Nobel Peace Laureates was held in 1999 as encouraged by the Gorbachev Foundation. Major World Summits have included the 2009 Berlin Summit celebrating the end of the Cold War and reunification of East and West, the 2010 Hiroshima Summit about global nuclear disarmament, and the 2012 Chicago Summit. World Summits have included guests such as the Dalai Lama, F.W. de Klerk and Lech Walesa, and Jayantha Dhanapala.

In February 2012, bankers from Russia's National Reserve Bank, after 130 Russian security service agents raided the bank, demanded information on funding to the Gorbachev Foundation, as well as to Novaya Gazeta.

During a Gorbachev Foundation-TIME interview in December 2014, following the Russian invasion of Crimea, Gorbachev claimed that the U.S. was starting a "new Cold War" although also stated "We have to return to what we started with at the end of the Cold War."

In 2017, the Gorbachev Foundation hosted a conference called "Russian Lessons for Reagan" involving various end of the Cold War diplomats, a book of the same name by Suzanne Massie, and guests included U.S. Ambassador John Huntsman, and former Soviet Foreign Minister Alexander Bessmertnykh.

In August 2021, on the 30th anniversary of the failed 1991 coup by hardliners, Gorbachev published a statement through the foundation: "I believe that the democratic path of Russia's development is the only correct one, that only on this path can our country develop and solve any problems."

== Foundation projects ==
- The Raisa Maximovna Club (launched in 1997)
- World Summit of Nobel Peace Laureates
- Green Cross International (Russian national office)
- The Global World of the XXI Century: Challenges and Responses
- The University of Calgary – the Gorbachev Foundation (1993–2003)
- Documentary History of Perestroika
- Mikhail Gorbachev After the Kremlin: a Record of Events and Socio-Political Activities
- Expertise Round Table
- The Gorbachev Readings
- The Public Affairs Center
