= Politizdat =

Soviet Pubslishing House

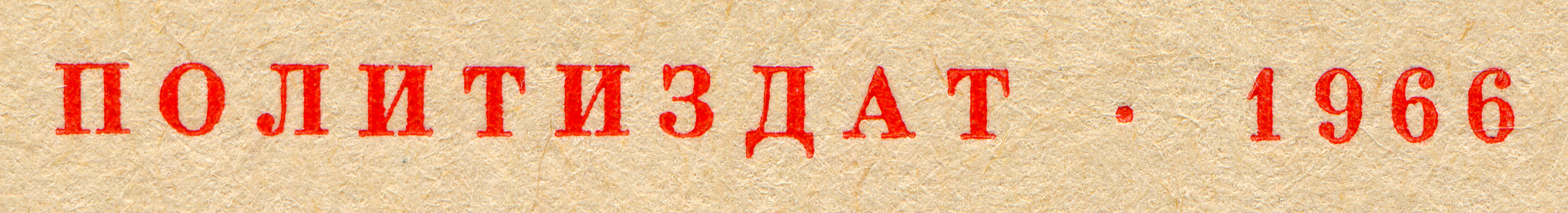
- Status: defunct
- Founded: 1918; 108 years ago
- Defunct: November 1991; 34 years ago
- Successor: Respublika
- Country of origin: Soviet Union
- Headquarters location: 125811, Moscow, Miusskaya Square, 7
- Key people: Vasily Sergeevich Molodtsov; Nikolai Vasilievich Tropkin
- Publication types: books
- Nonfiction topics: political literature
- Owner: Central Committee of the Communist Party of the Soviet Union

Politizdat (Note: Russian: Политиздат, full name: Publishing House of Political Literature of the Central Committee of the CPSU, Russian: Издательство политической литературы ЦК КПСС, lit. 'Izdatel'stvo politicheskoy literatury TsK KPSS') was the primary party publishing house of the Central Committee of the Communist Party of the Soviet Union (CPSU). It held a dominant position in the production and dissemination of ideological, Marxist-Leninist, and propagandistic literature throughout much of the Soviet era. In quantitative terms, Politizdat was consistently the most "mass" publisher in the Soviet Union, with print runs that far outstripped those of other publishing houses.

As the official organ for political literature, Politizdat published key party documents, collected works of leaders, theoretical treatises, and biographical materials designed to educate and mobilize the Soviet populace. Its output formed a cornerstone of state propaganda.

== History ==
The origins of Politizdat date back to the summer of 1918, shortly after the October Revolution, when it was established as the publishing house "Kommunist" to coordinate political literature. In May 1919, it became part of the State Publishing House (Gosizdat) under the People's Commissariat of Education. Through reorganizations in the 1920s–1930s, it evolved into Partizdat (Party Publishing House) in 1931, then Gospolitizdat in 1941. In 1963, it was renamed Politizdat and became the central publishing house directly subordinate to the CPSU Central Committee. It operated continuously from 1918 until 1991.

Politizdat operated as the default leader in mass political publishing, producing materials on party building, scientific communism, atheism, and international revolutionary movements. Its publications included official congress materials, plenary resolutions, and speeches by party leaders.

=== The Post-Stalin "Literary Turn" ===
A pivotal shift occurred in the 1950s and 1960s, characterized as Politizdat's "literary turn" after Stalin. Previous publications were criticized for their dry, ineffective style, prompting a deliberate search for more engaging forms of propaganda..

The critique of earlier styles as "dry and ineffective" led to unprecedented internal discussions within the publishing house about improving propaganda's appeal. This period saw Politizdat experimenting with genre and authorship to make ideological content more attractive to mass readers..

=== The "Fiery Revolutionaries" Series ===
The most significant outcome of this literary turn was the launch of the "Fiery Revolutionaries" (Plamennye revoliutsionery) biographical series in the late 1960s (starting around 1968). This long-running project, which continued through late socialism until the Soviet collapse, comprised over 150–156 biographies and historical novels.

Targeted explicitly at mass readers, the series aimed to rekindle enthusiasm for the revolutionary past by blending historical narratives with party orthodoxy. Politizdat deliberately privileged novelists and literary authors when commissioning works, sometimes "borrowing" from existing popular literature to enhance appeal.

The series represented a large-scale, long-term experiment with the biography genre, reflecting Politizdat's precarious position between Central Committee oversight and the need for reader engagement.

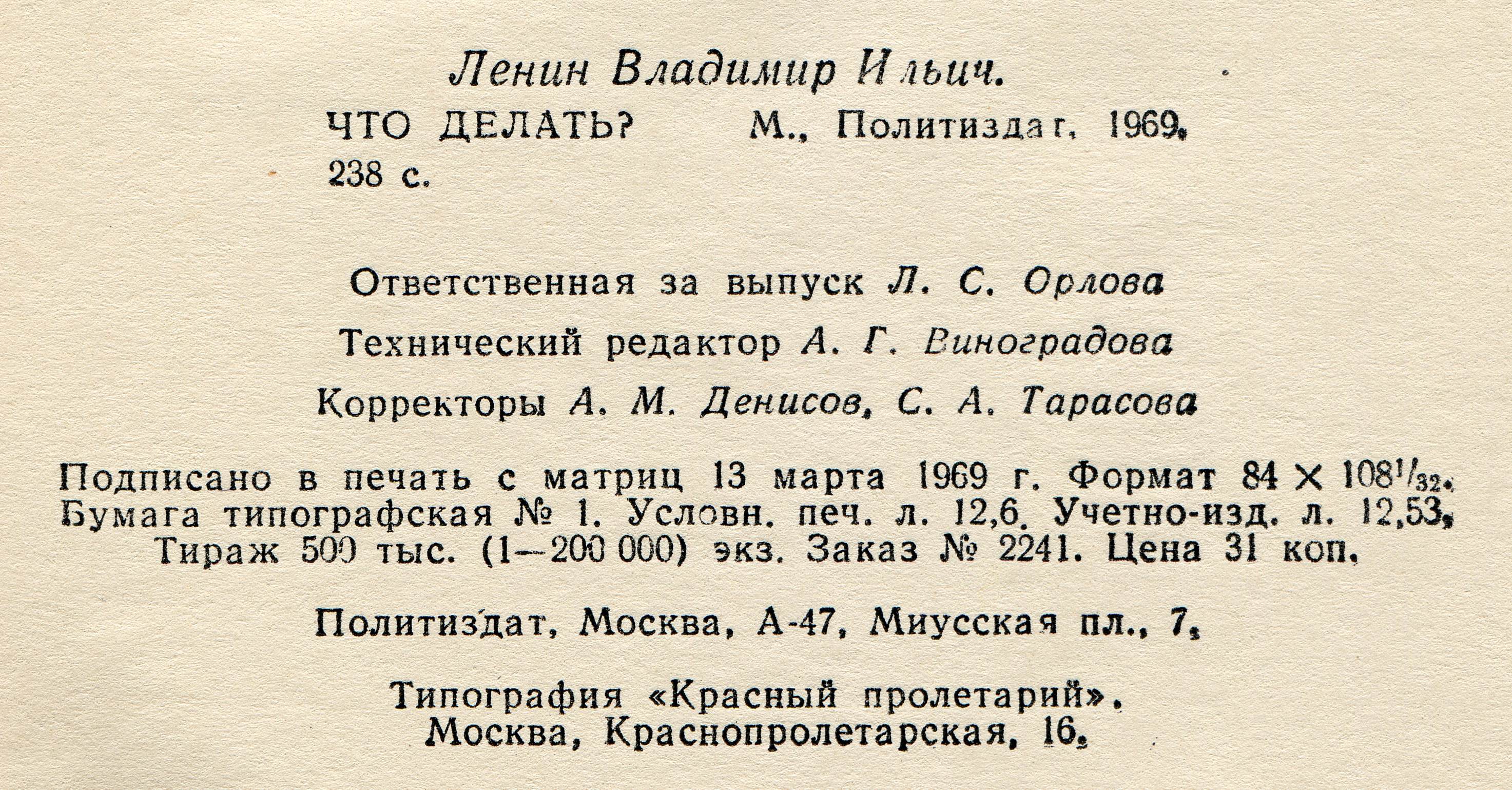
What Is to Be Done? by Vladimir Lenin book data

Beyond the Fiery Revolutionaries, Politizdat published multi-volume collected works (e.g., Lenin, Marx-Engels), anti-religious materials, and critiques of bourgeois theories.

=== Closure ===
Politizdat ceased operations in 1991 amid the collapse of the Soviet Union and the ban on CPSU activities. Its late initiatives, particularly the Fiery Revolutionaries series, have been analyzed as attempts to sustain revolutionary fervor in an era of stagnation, ultimately revealing the challenges of adapting propaganda to changing reader expectations.

== Bibliography ==
- Jones, Polly (2019). Revolution Rekindled: The Writers and Readers of Late Soviet Biography. Oxford University Press. p. 320. ISBN 9780191842658.
