= Gafur Mendagaliev =

Russian painter

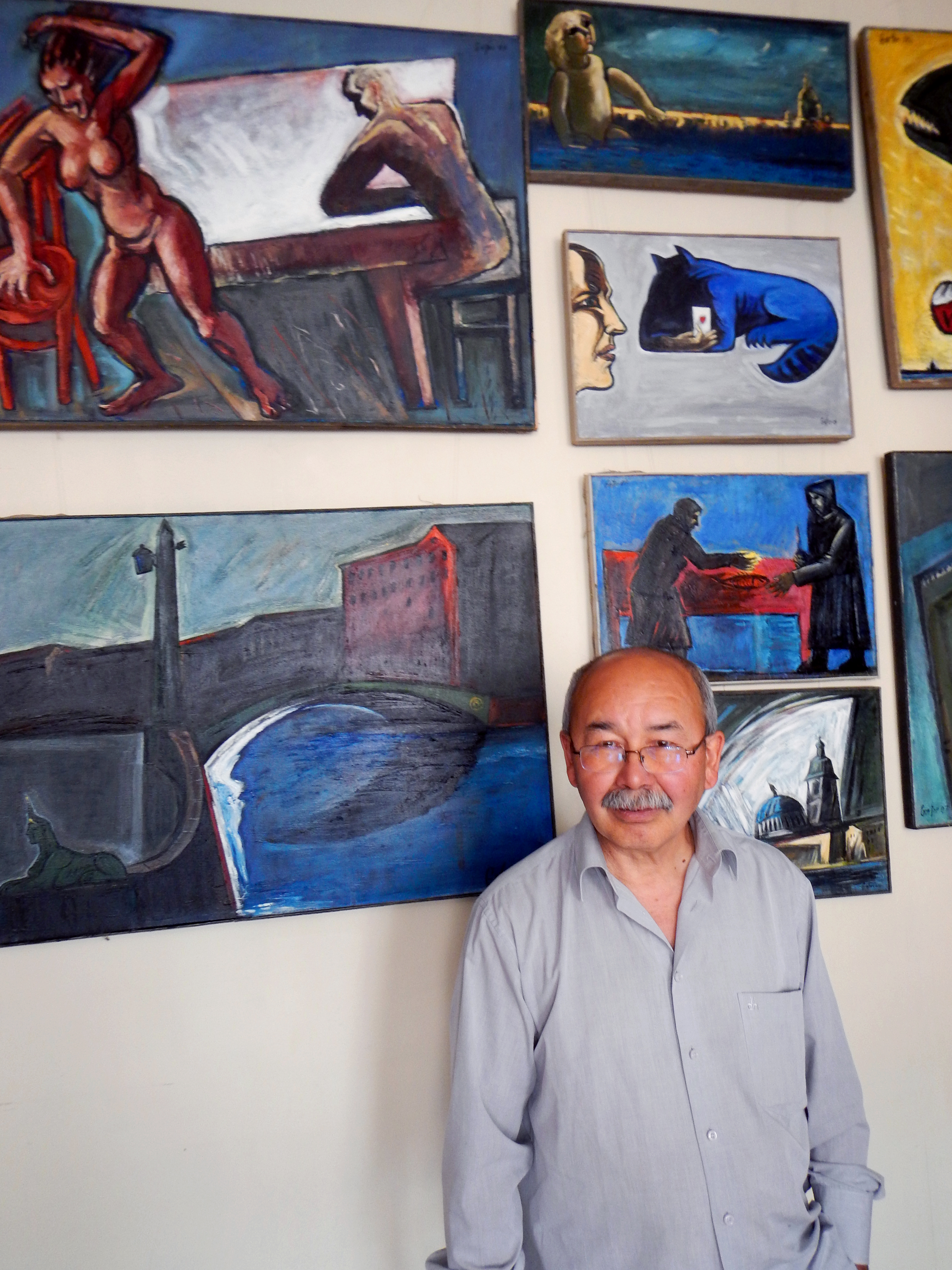
- Born: Gafur Sifatovich Mendagaliev; June 2, 1954 (age 72); Kamyzyak, Soviet Union
- Known for: Painting, Graphics
- Movement: arts

Gafur Sifatovich Mendagaliev (known by his pen name Gafor. Russian: Гафур Сифатович Мендагалиев; June 2, 1954) is a Soviet and Russian painter, graphic artist, book artist, and sculptor.

== Biography ==
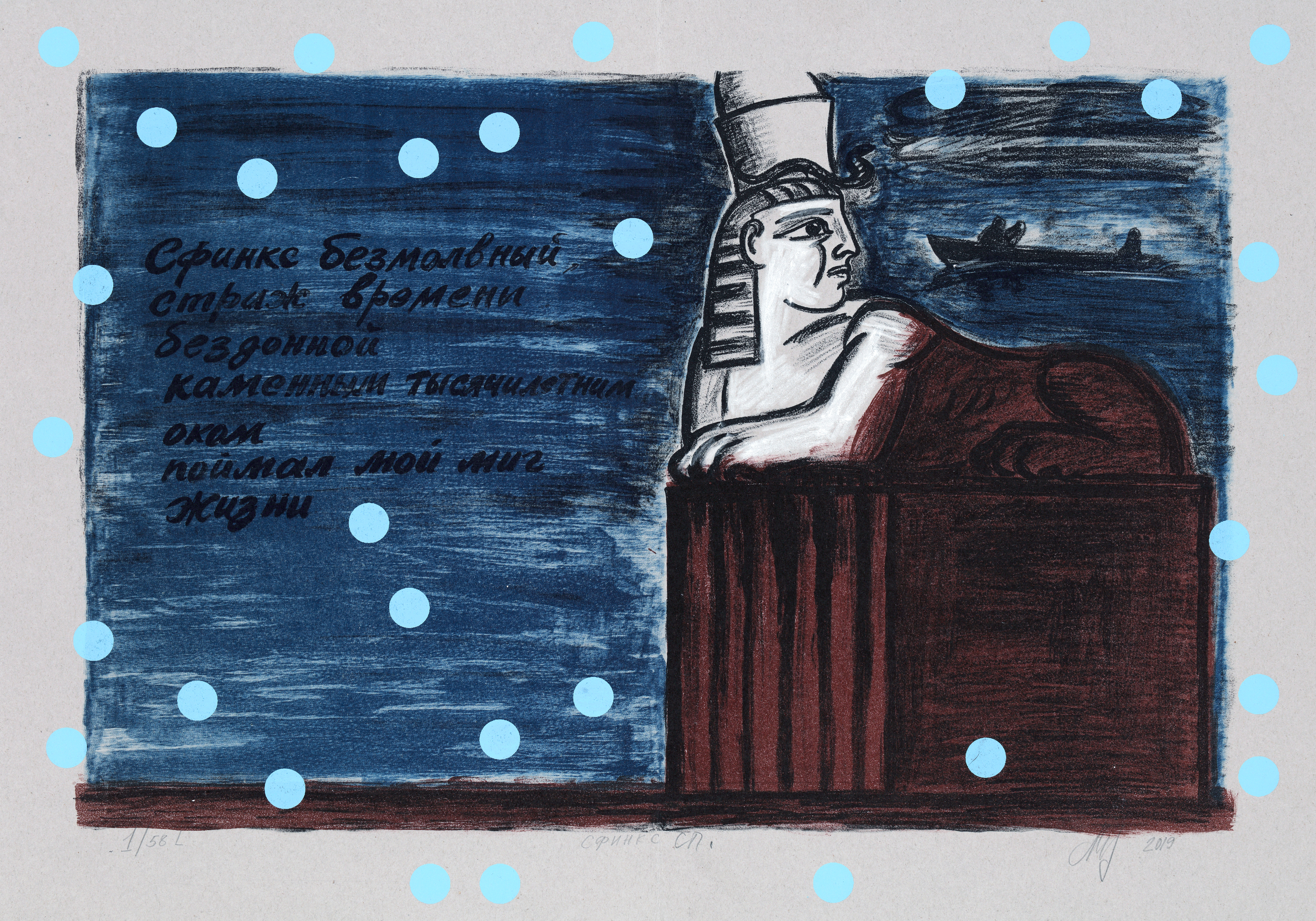
The Sphinx St. Petersburg. No. 1/58. 2019, mixed media. The Hermitage Museum. Hermitage Academic Library Collection. (For the project City as an Artist's Subjectivity)

Gafur Mendagaliev was born in Kamyzyak (Astrakhan region). Graduated from Astrakhan Art School named after Vlasov (1979-1983). Studied painting in A.V. Kondratyev's studio. Member of "Kochevye" group. Participant of over 100 exhibitions in Russia and abroad (since 1987).

An avant-garde artist of Leningrad, Mendagaliev’s style is naïve. Vibrant colors and thick, heavy strokes form simple scenes that feel more symbolic than real.In each painting, there are repeated motifs: a table, a chimera, women, a bird, a fish. There appears to be a story begging to be told about the city he has lived in for so long, and, perhaps, a painful one. In the paintings, faces of people look in different directions, they pull from each other, guiding the viewer’s eyes into a chaos as the sphinx overlooks it all with a sense of doom. Then, there are portraits of chimeras and demons stalking individuals on the metro, women tormented next to a table or underwater beneath a fish in flight. They have a sinister tone to them. Fantastical, but simple, Mendagaliev’s works linger in the mind and resurface in the memory of St. Petersburg as a city.

The artist's personal exhibitions were presented in St. Petersburg, Paris and Munich (Opera Galerie, Paris, 1993; Galerie Kloska und Vinogradov, Munich, 1995; Galerie im Stiegoibaus, Munich, 1997; Mednis Gallery, 1995; Kaliningrad, 2000; Museum of Urban Sculpture, 2002 (St. Petersburg); Stray Dog Cafe, 2007 (St. Petersburg); Konstantinovsky Palace, National Congress palace, 2008; Diaghilev Center, St. Petersburg State University, 2010 (St. Petersburg); Pushkinskaya 10, 2012 (St. Petersburg); Borey, 2013 (St. Petersburg); Hotel Rachmaninov, 2014 (St. Petersburg); Matiss Club, 2017 (St. Petersburg); Guild of Masters, 2017 (St. Petersburg), etc.

Project member: City as an Artist's Subjectivity (2020).

Lives and works in St. Petersburg (since 1983).

== Museum collections ==
The artist's works are in the following museum collections/ State Catalogue of the Museum Fund of Russia:

- Hermitage Museum. Hermitage Academic Library/ Rare Books and Manuscripts Sector. (St. Petersburg).
- Russian Museum. Department of engraving XVIII-XXI centuries. (St. Petersburg)
- National Library of Russia. Department of Prints (St. Petersburg)
- Diaghilev Contemporary Art Museum (St. Petersburg);
- Garage Museum of Contemporary Art. (Moscow). Library/ Artist's Books Dept;
- MISP the Museum of 20th and 21st Century St. Petersburg Art (St. Petersburg);
- Museum of Non-conformist Art Pushkinskaya 10 (St. Petersburg);
- Museum of Urban Sculpture (St. Petersburg).
- Yaroslavl Art Museum;
- Mordovian Republican Museum named after S.D. Erzya (Saransk);
- Astrakhan Art Museum;

== Bibliography ==
- Alexey Parygin A City as the Artist's Subjectivity // Book Arts Newsletter. — No. 140. Bristol: CFPR (Centre for Fine Print Research). University of the West of England, 2021, July–August. — pp. 46–48. ISSN 1754-9086
- City as Artist's subjectivity. Artist's book project. Catalog. Authors of the articles: Parygin A.B., Markov T.A., Klimova E.D., Borovsky A.D., Severyukhin D.Ya., Grigoryants E.I., Blagodatov N.I. (Rus & En) — Saint Petersburg: Ed. T. Markova. 2020. — 128 p. ISBN 978-5-906281-32-6

== Gallery of works ==
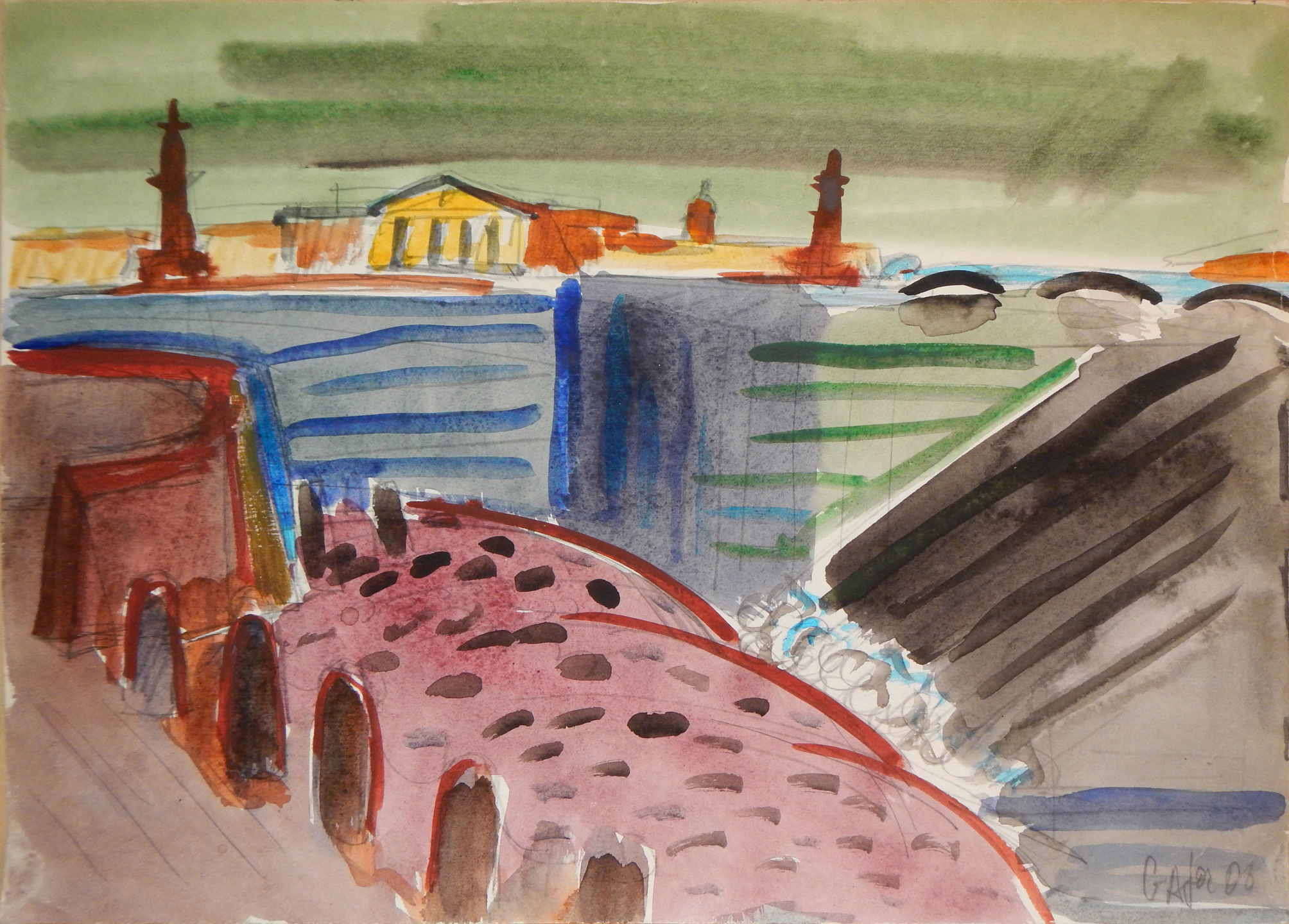

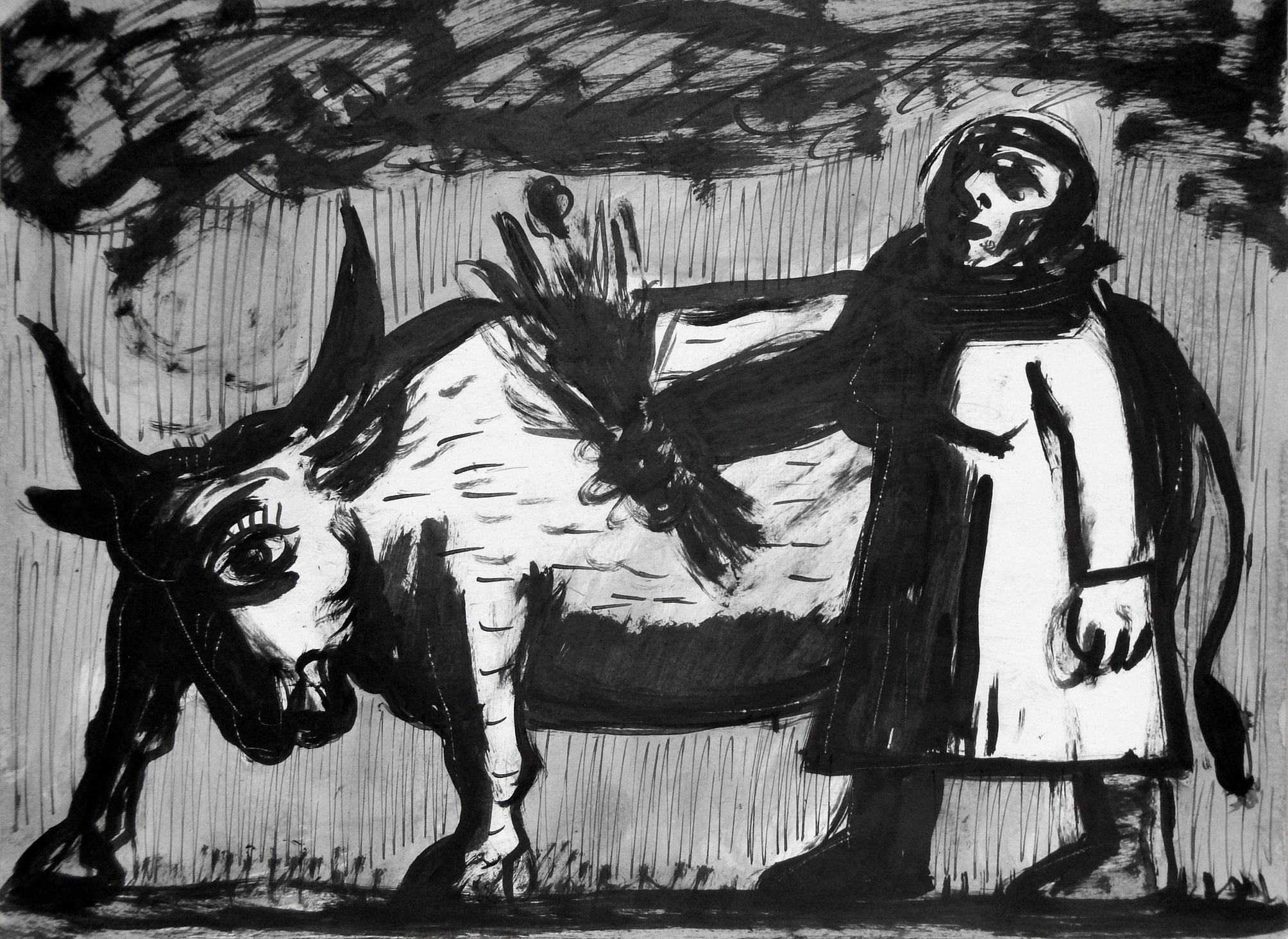

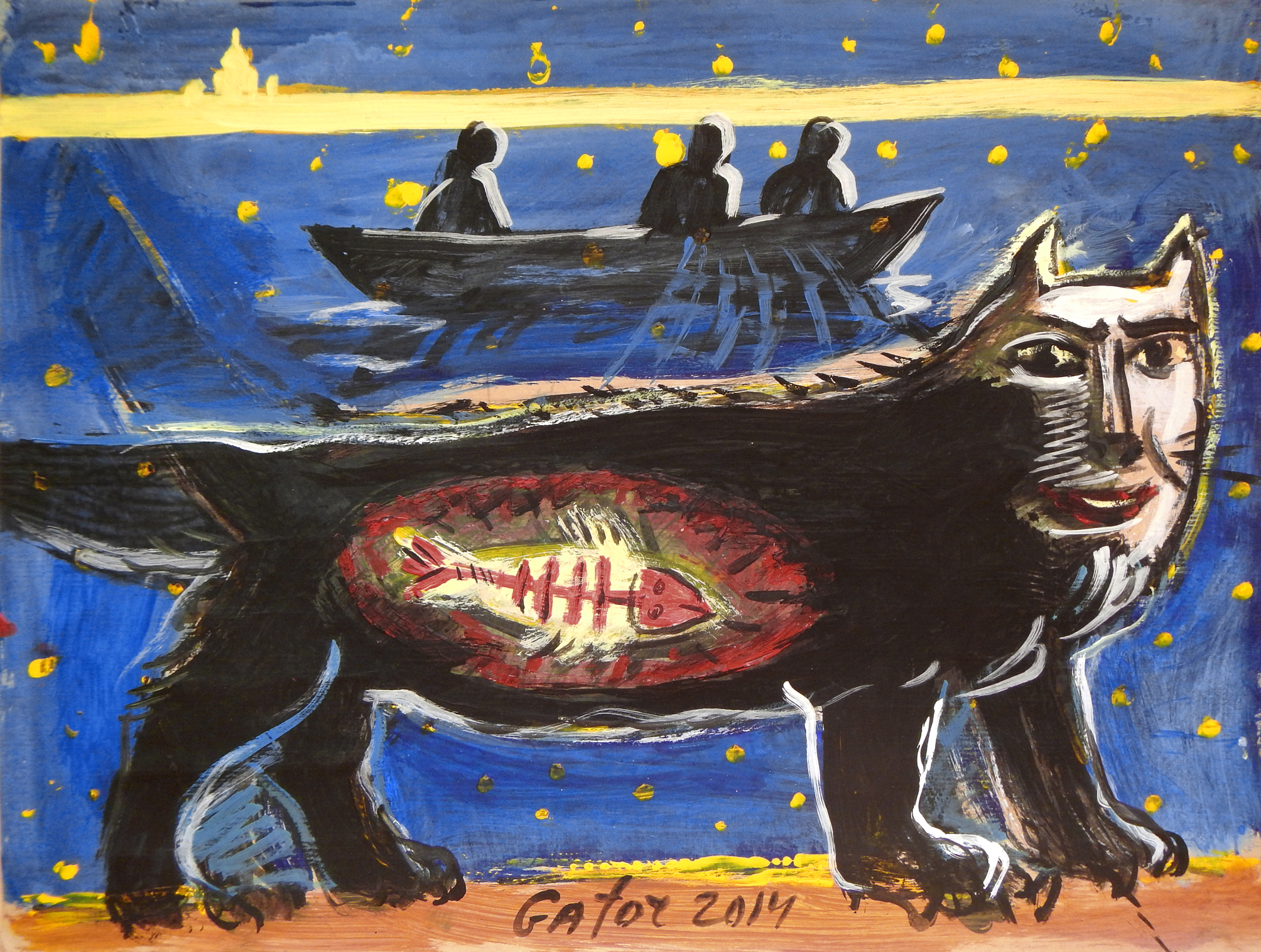

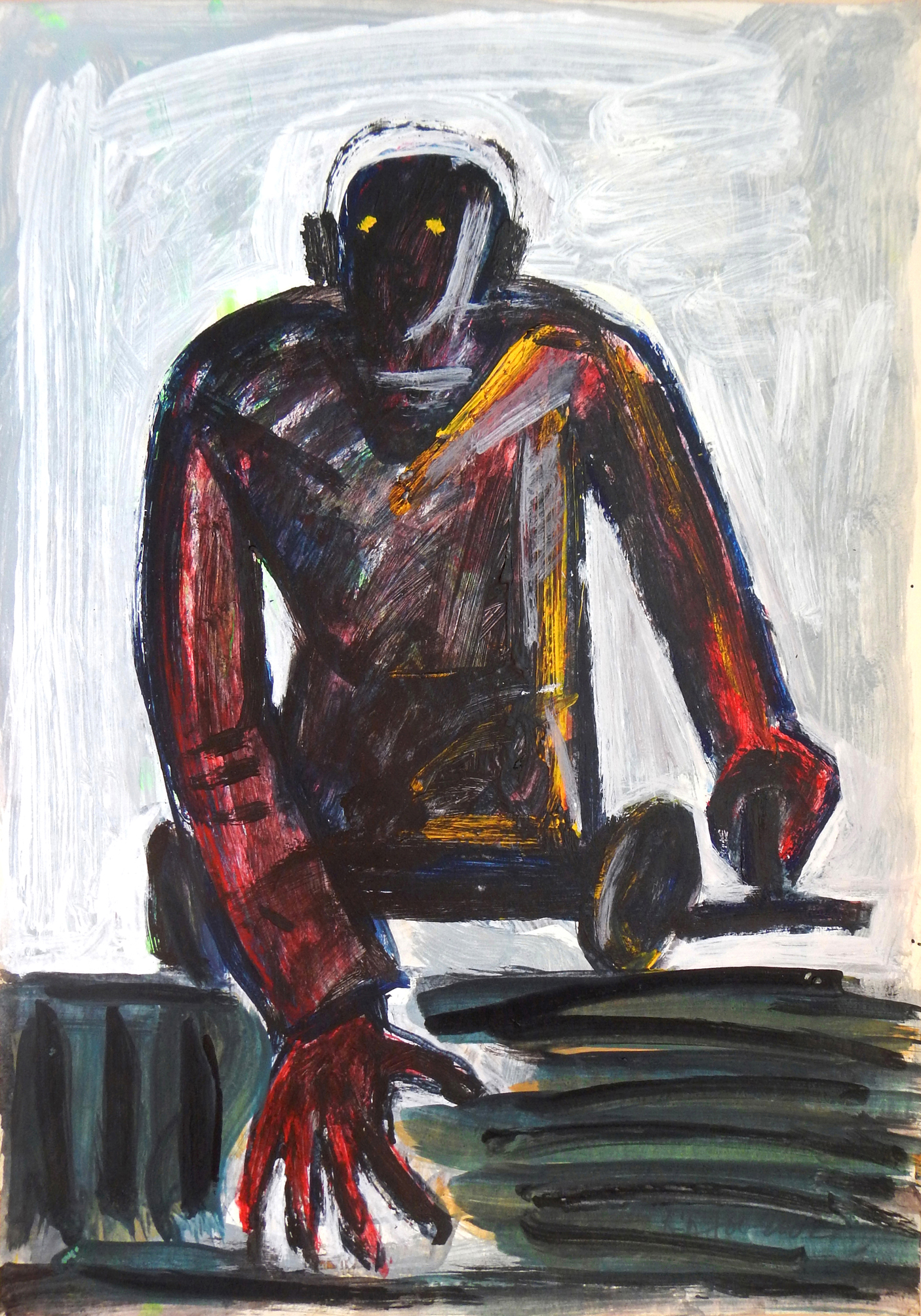

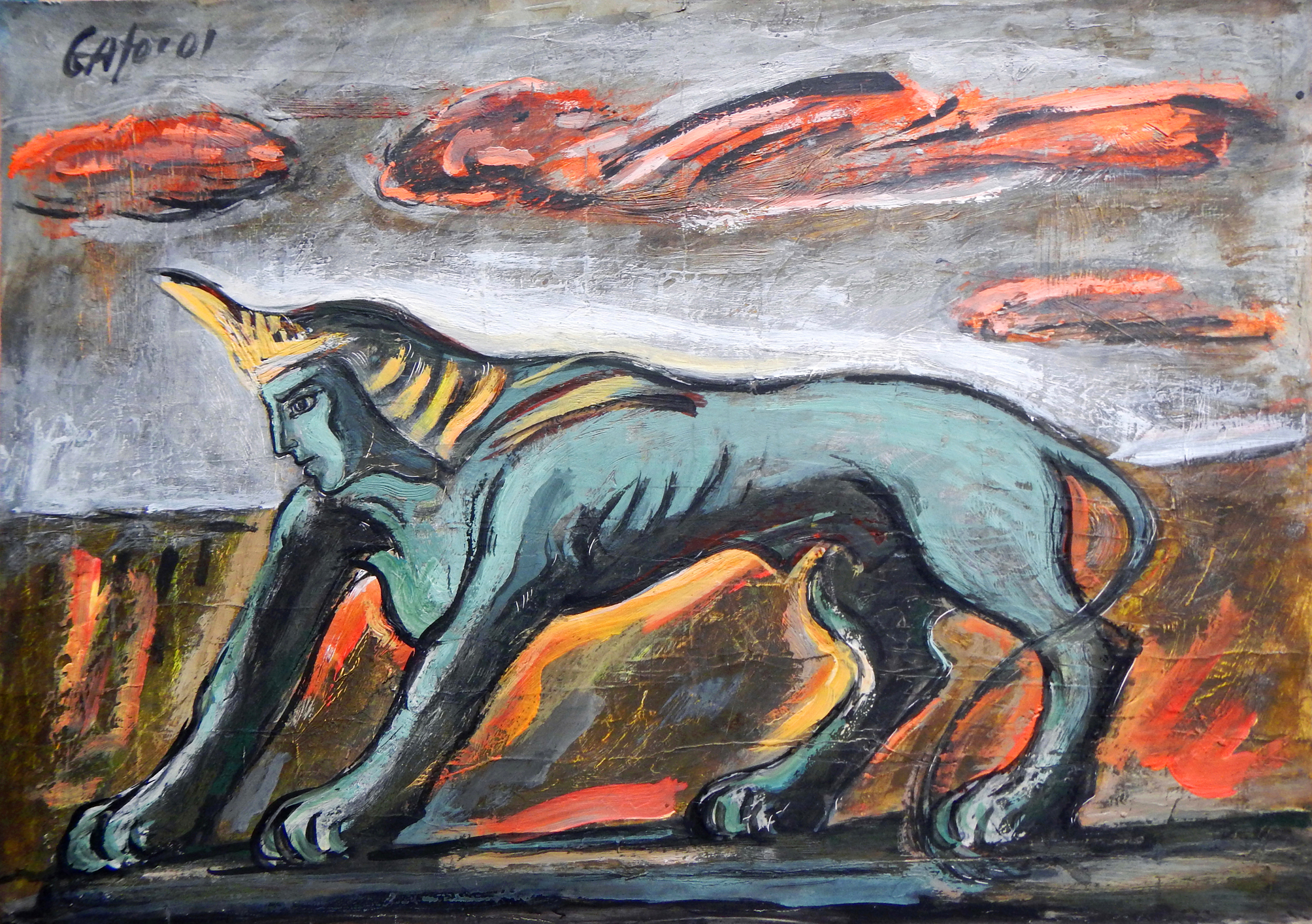

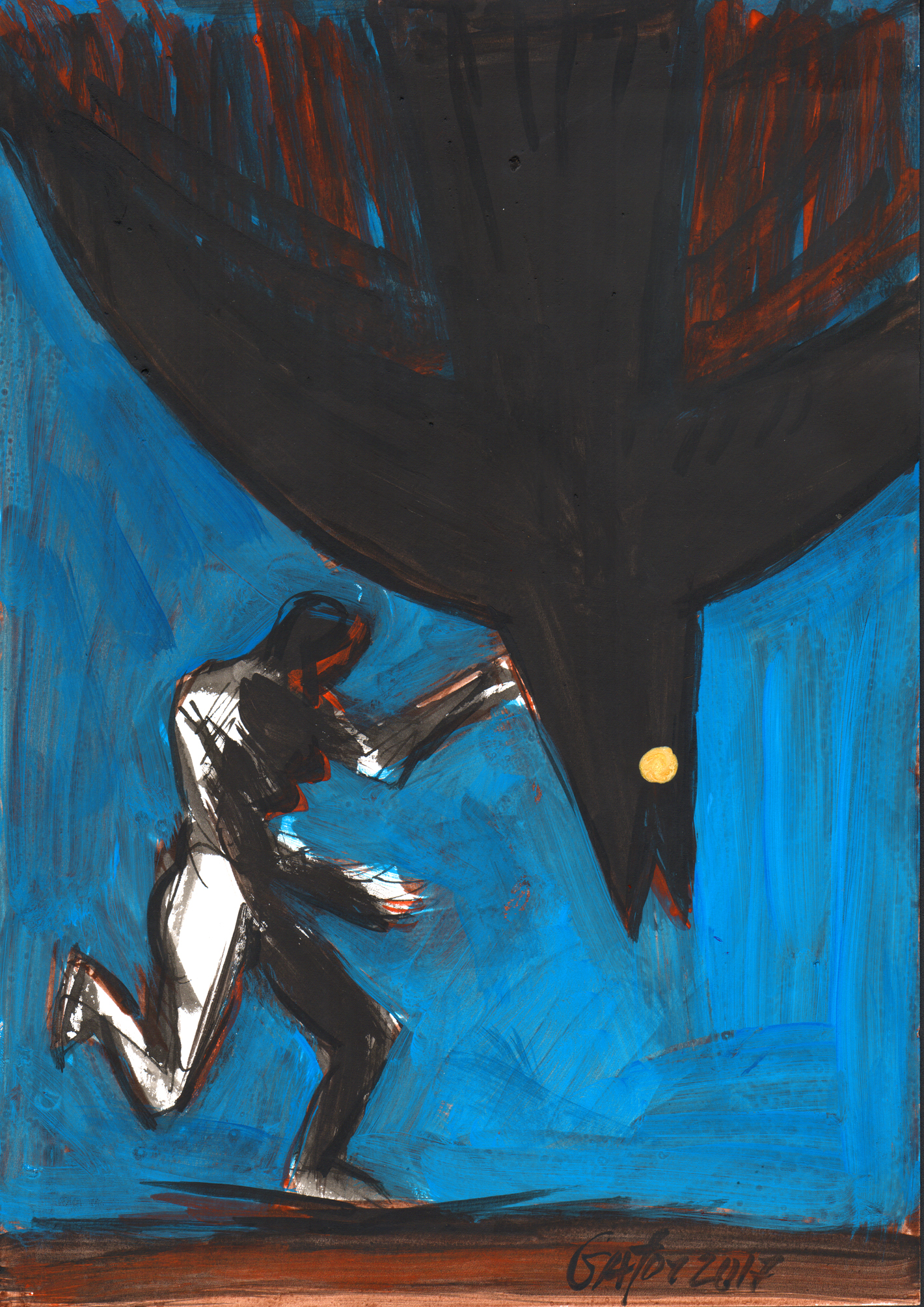

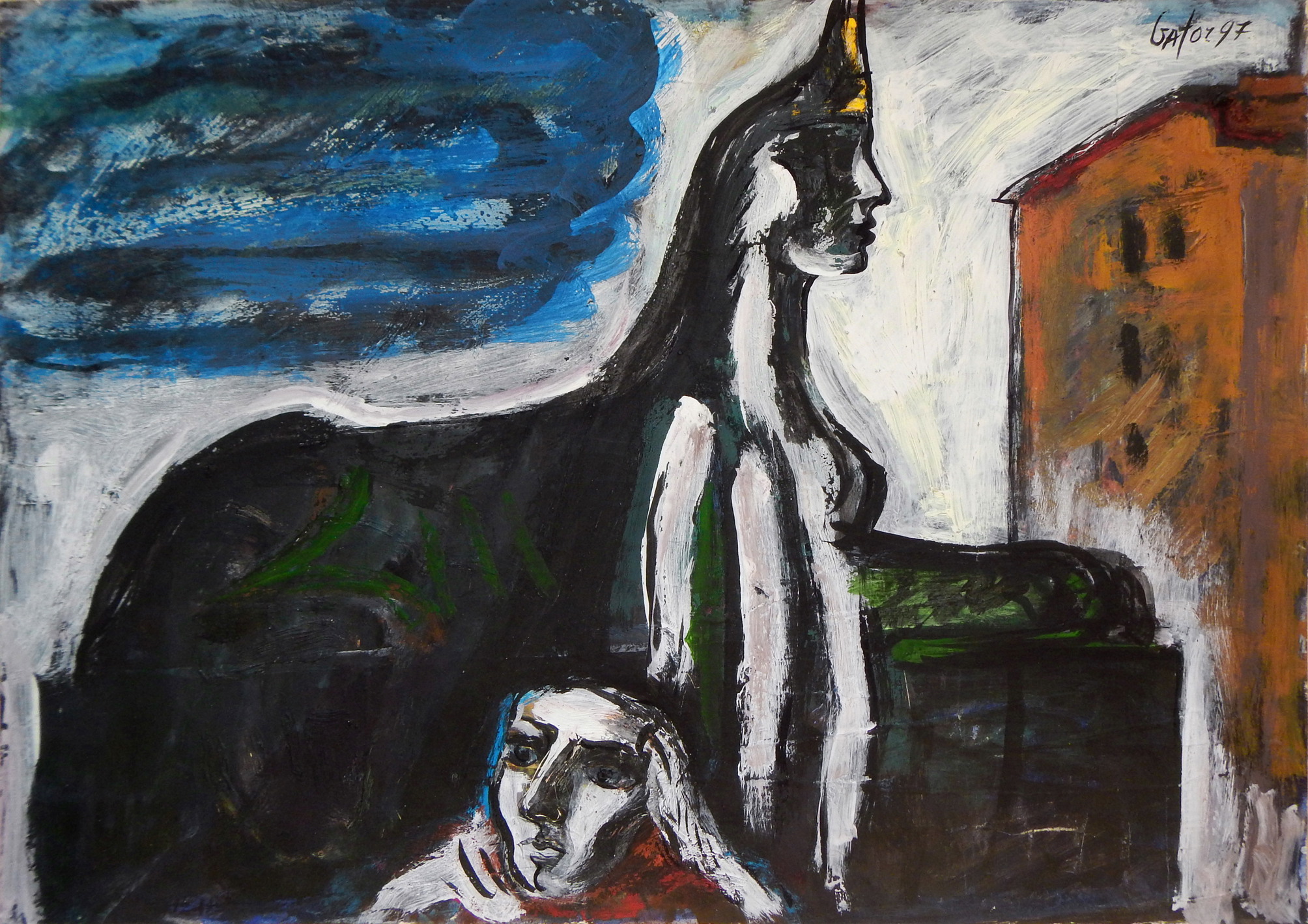
