= Anatoly Vasiliev (painter) =

Russian painter

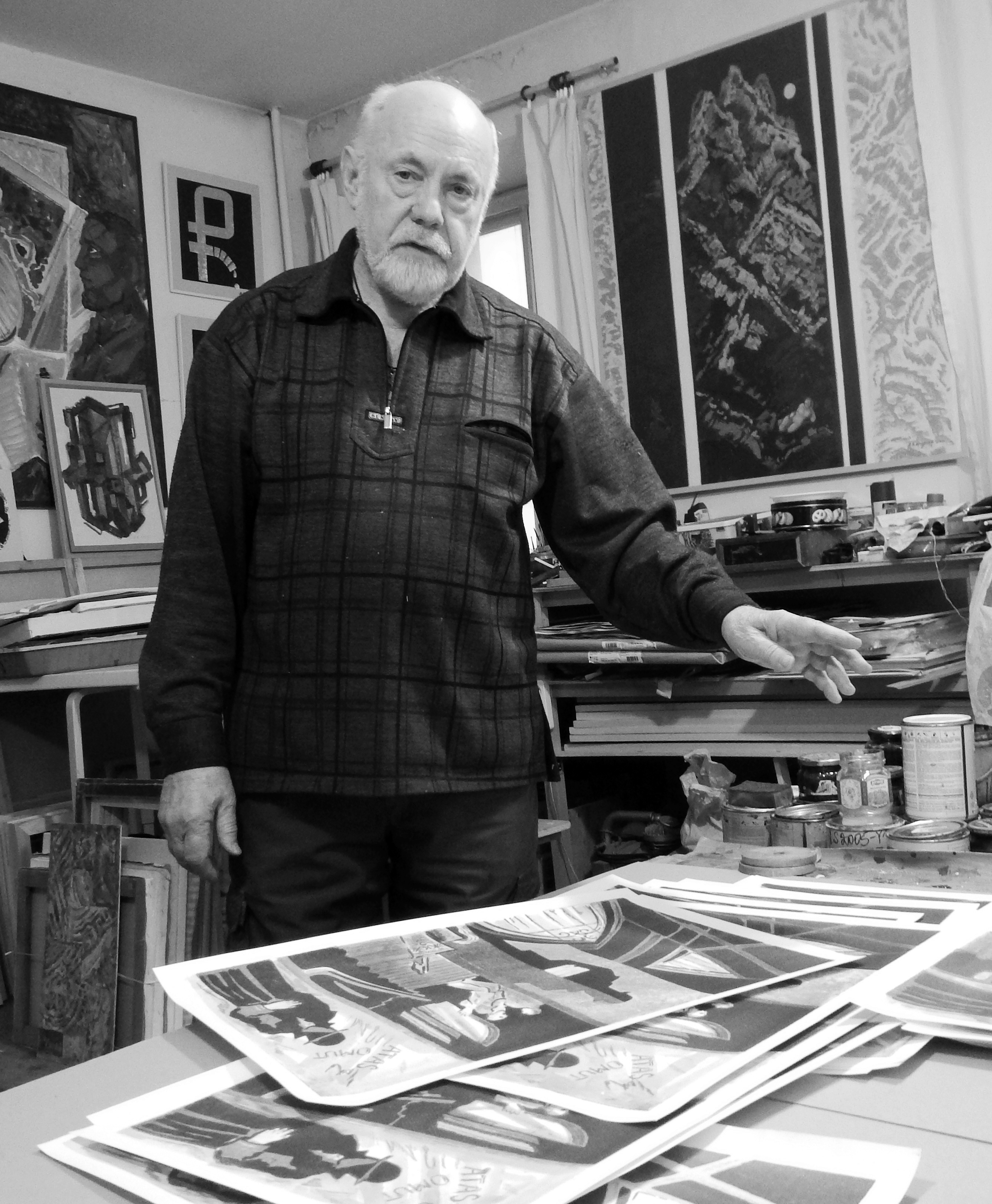
- Born: Anatoly Nikolayevich Vasiliev; November 22, 1940; Riga, Latvian SSR, USSR
- Died: November 13, 2020 (aged 79); Saint Petersburg
- Known for: Painting, Graphics
- Movement: arts

Anatoly Nikolayevich Vasiliev (Russian: Анато́лий Никола́евич Васи́льев; November 22, 1940 – November 13, 2020) was a Soviet and Russian painter, architect, graphic artist and book artist.

== Biography ==
Anatoly Vasiliev was born in Riga (Latvia). Later, he lived in Poland, Germany; From 1945 to 1954—in Kaliningrad. Since 1955 he lived in Leningrad. Graduated from Leningrad Higher Art School named after V.I. Mukhina, Department of Buildings Interior Decoration (1965).

One of the first Leningrad nonconformists. Participated in unofficial art exhibitions and manifestations (Harbor, 1962; on Kustarny, 1971; at Kuzminsky, 1974; Nevsky Palace of Culture, 1975; Ordzhonikidze Palace of Culture, 1976). Participant and exhibitor of associations: Experimental Exhibitions Association, Association of Experimental Fine Art, IFA.

Upon Perestroika, started travelling abroad: France (1989); Belgium (1990); USA (since 1991); Austria (personal exhibition in Saalbach, 1999). As artist, took part in Venice Carnivals (together with Mihail Chemiakin). First personal exhibition—Borey Gallery (St. Petersburg, 1994).

Project member: City as an Artist's Subjectivity (2020).

He lived and worked in Saint Petersburg. Anatoly Vasiliev died in November 13, 2020.

== Museum collections ==
The artist's works are in the following museum collections/ State Catalogue of the Museum Fund of Russia and others.

- Hermitage Museum. Hermitage Academic Library/ Rare Books and Manuscripts Sector. (St. Petersburg).
- Russian Museum. Department of engraving XVIII-XXI centuries. (St. Petersburg)
- National Library of Russia. Department of Prints (St. Petersburg)
- Garage Museum of Contemporary Art. (Moscow). Library/ Artist's Books Dept.
- Museum of Art of St. Petersburg of the 20th and 21st centuries. Saint Petersburg Manege. (St. Petersburg)
- State Museum of the History of St. Petersburg. (St. Petersburg)
- Dostoevsky Museum. (St. Petersburg)
- Anna Akhmatova Literary and Memorial Museum. (St. Petersburg)
- State Museum of Urban Sculpture. (St. Petersburg)
- Museum of Nonconformist Art, Pushkinskaya 10 (St. Petersburg)
- Kaluga Museum of Fine Arts. (Kaluga)
- State Fine Arts Museum of the Republic of Tatarstan. Graphics collection. (Kazan)
- Pushkin Museum (Kazan)
- Murmansk Regional Art Museum (Murmansk)

== Bibliography ==
- Alexey Parygin A City as the Artist's Subjectivity // Book Arts Newsletter. — No. 140. Bristol: CFPR (Centre for Fine Print Research). University of the West of England, 2021, July–August. — pp. 46–48. ISSN 1754-9086
- City as Artist's subjectivity. Artist's book project. Catalog. Authors of the articles: Parygin A.B., Markov T.A., Klimova E.D., Borovsky A.D., Severyukhin D.Ya., Grigoryants E.I., Blagodatov N.I. (Rus & En) — Saint Petersburg: Ed. T. Markova. 2020. — 128 p. ISBN 978-5-906281-32-6
- Анатолий Васильев. Живопись. Графика/ Альбом. Серия Авангард на Неве. Авторы статей: Харолд ван де Перре, Заславский А., Герман М. — СПб: Диан. 2017. — 216 с.: цв. ил. ISBN 978-5-99099-78-4-4
