= City as an Artist's Subjectivity =

Artist's book by Alexey Parygin

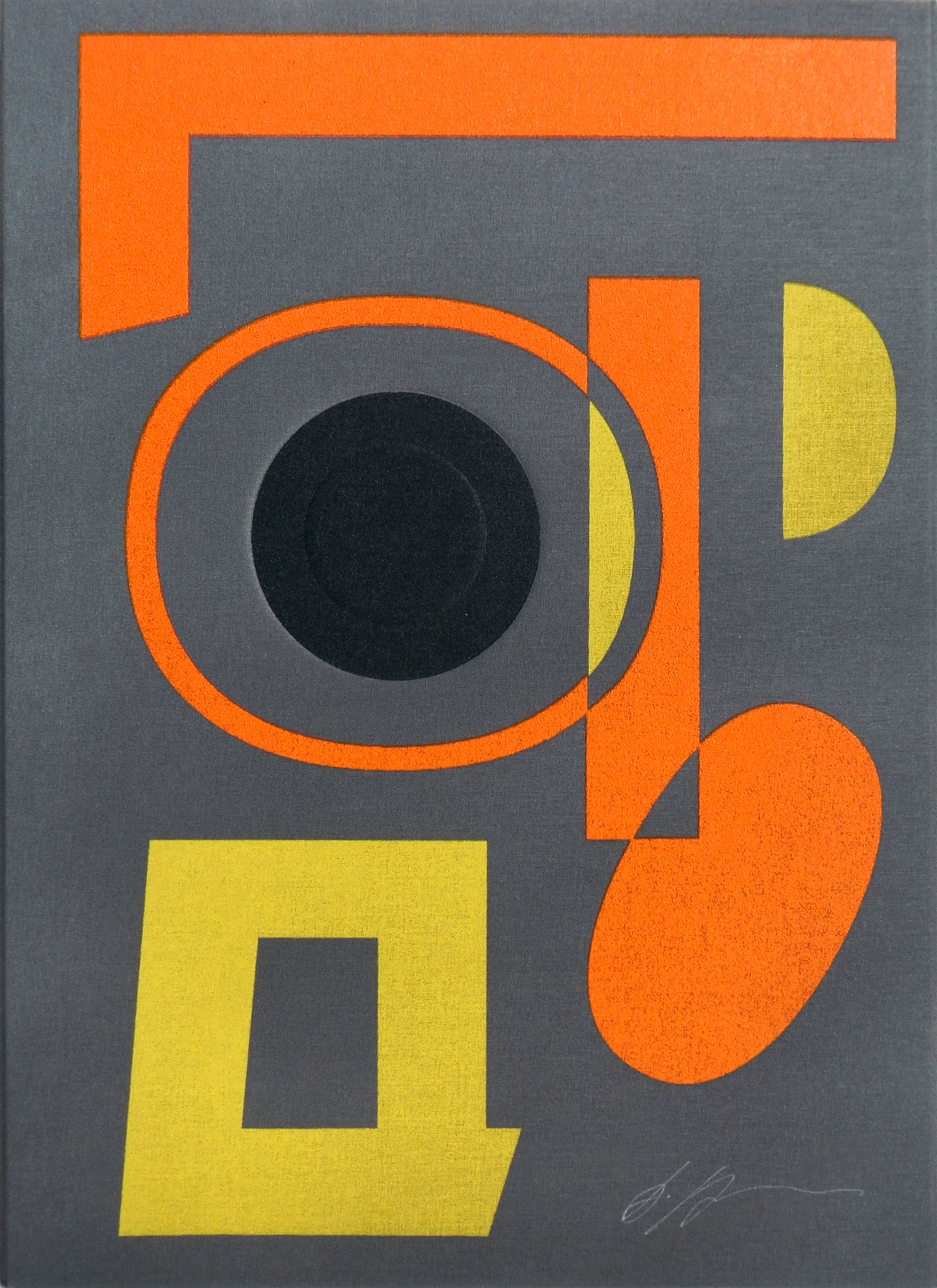
- Author: Alexey Parygin
- Original title: Город как субъективность художника
- Language: Russian
- Genre: Artists' books
- Publisher: Timofey Markov Publishing House
- Publication date: 2020
- Media type: Book
- Pages: 38

City as an Artist's Subjectivity (Russian: Го́род как субъекти́вность худо́жника, romanized: Górod kak sub"yektívnost' khudózhnika. 2020) is a publication in the format of an artist's book, spearheaded in St. Petersburg by the artist-curator Alexey Parygin. Thirty-five modern artists from four Russian cities took part in the project (Saint Petersburg, Moscow, Nizhny Novgorod, Kazan).

== History of creation ==
Every invited artist created only one graphic composition accompanied by the author's commentary, a short text with their understanding of a large modern city. All graphic sheets are collected in specially designed publishing boxes. The limited edition of the portfolio included 58 numbered copies, signed by the authors of the compositions, the curator and the publisher.

All graphic sheets are made in color, in various printed graphic techniques: lithography, linocut, woodcut, plywood engraving, serigraphy, stencil, etching, manual typesetting, manual photo printing and others. So each sheet of this edition is different from one another: tinting with a brush and spray paint, colored pencils, watercolor or acrylic. All graphic sheets are created on paper of different type and tone, specially selected for each author, which was the project's program setting.

The curator invited artists with an established creative style to participate in this publication. All of them belong to different generations and schools and have different, sometimes diametrically opposed views on the tasks and value criteria of art.

Thirty-five project artists: Vladimir Kachalsky, Valery Mishin, Alexandr Borkov, Valery Korchagin, Viktor Remishevsky, Alexey Parygin, Viktor Lukin, Marina Spivak, Mikhail Pogarsky, Igor Ivanov, Grigory Katsnelson, Leonid Tishkov, Andrey Korolchuk, Gafur Mendagaliev, Kira Matissen, Petr Perevezentsev, Ella Tsyplyakova, Yan Antonyshev, Mikhail Molochnikov, Dmitry Kawarga, Igor Baskin, Boris Zabirokhin, Evgeny Strelkov, Anatoly Vasilev, Vasiliy Vlasov, Alexandr Pozin, Vyacheslav Shilov, Nadezhda Anfalova, Ekaterina Posetselskaya, Andrey Chezhin, Igor Ganzenko, Yuri Shtapakov, Alexandr Artamonov, Anastasiya Zykina and Vasya Khorst.

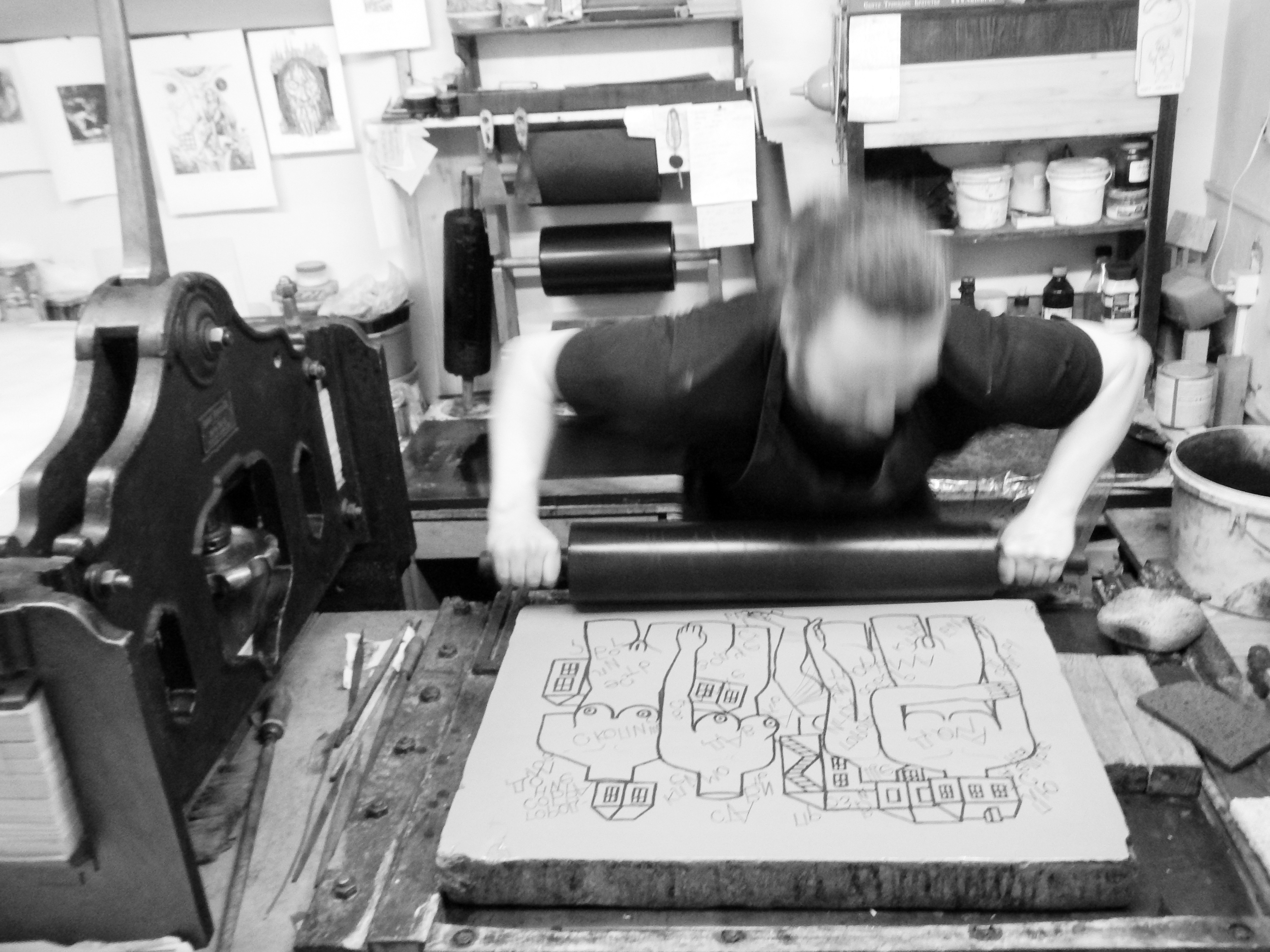
City as an Artist's Subjectivity. Work in progress. Lithography. 2019

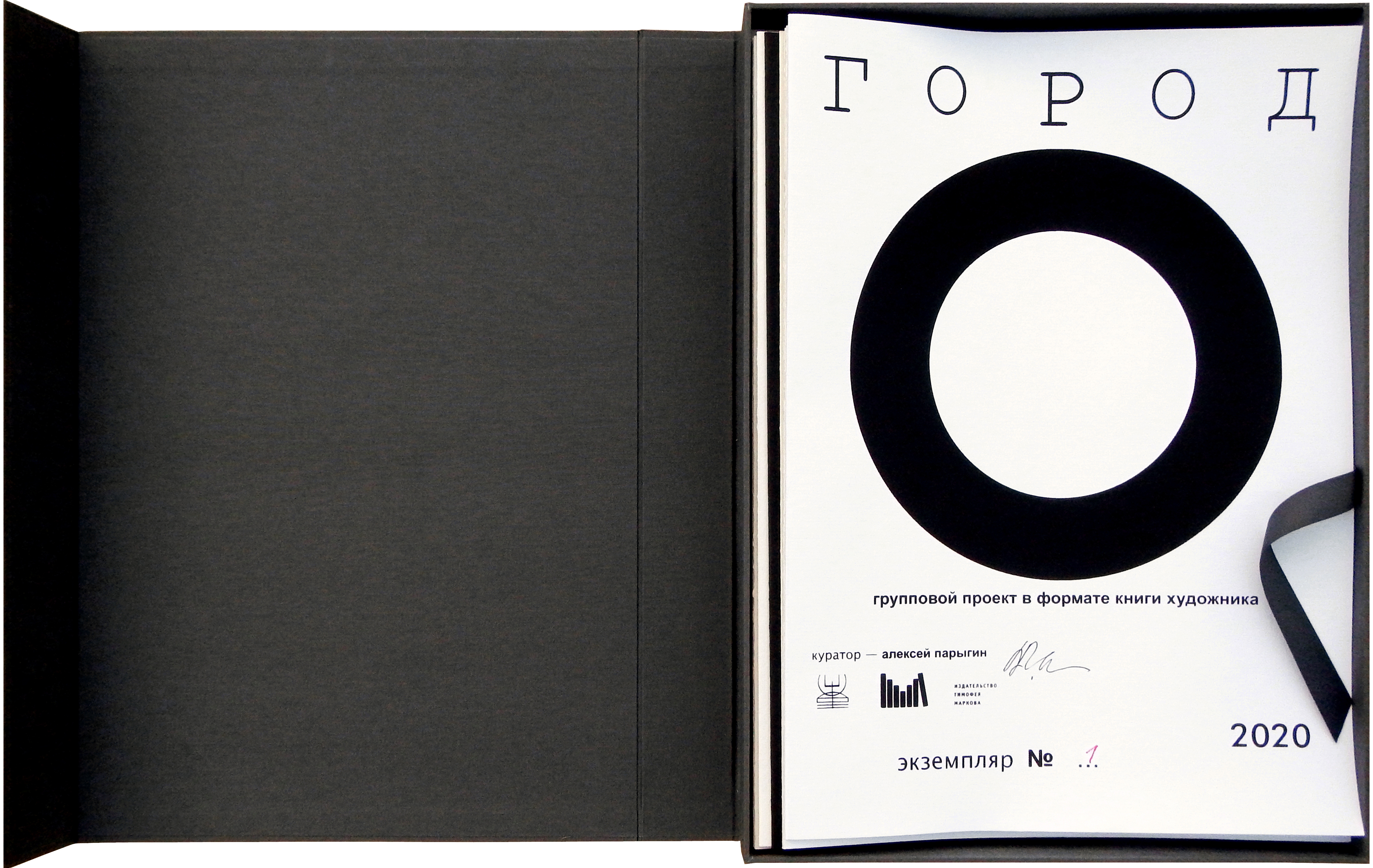
City as an Artist’s Subjectivity. No. 1/58. 2020, box, serigraphy. The Hermitage Museum. Hermitage Academic Library Collection

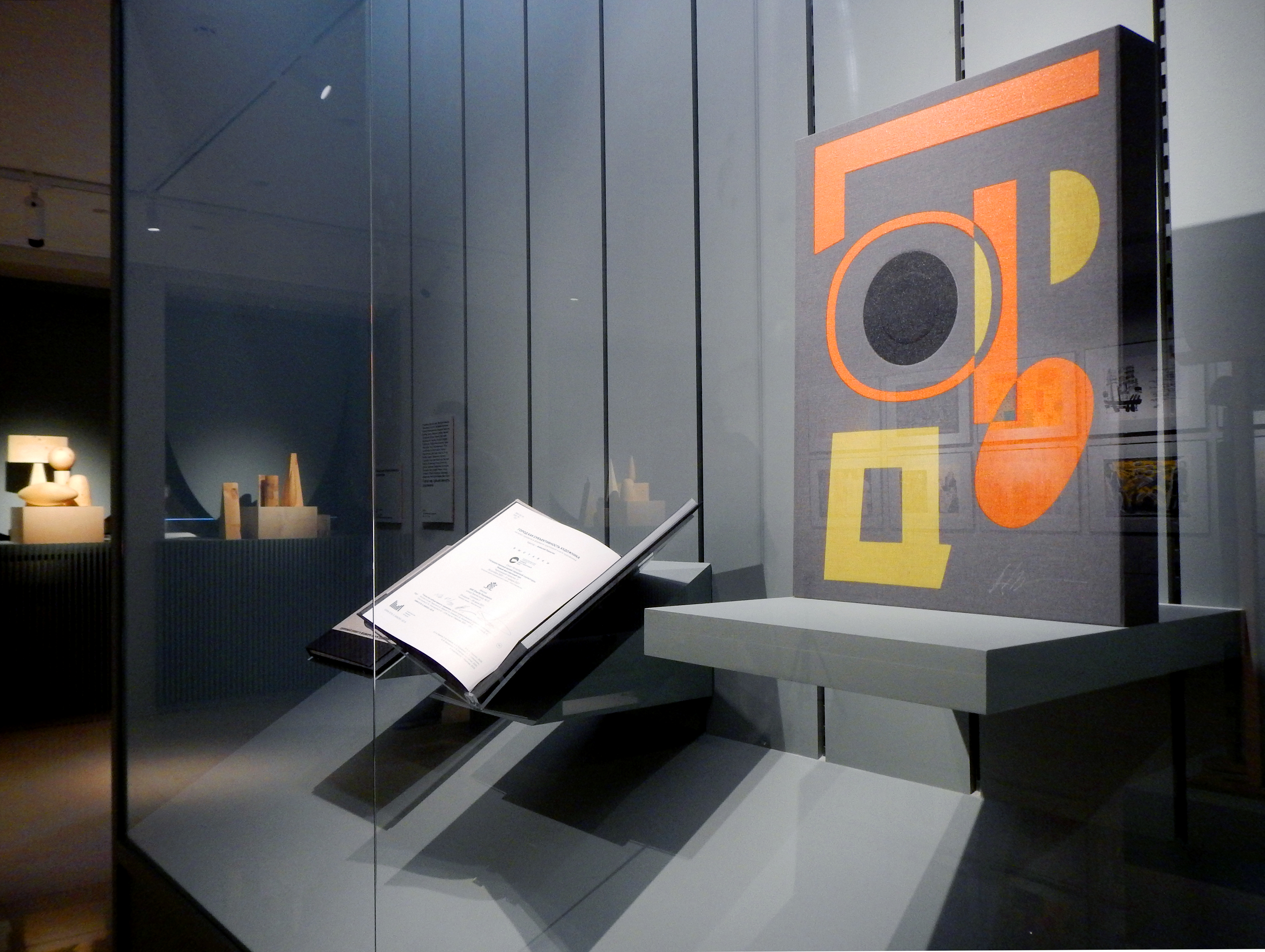
City as an Subjectivity. Exhibition. 2021. Moscow

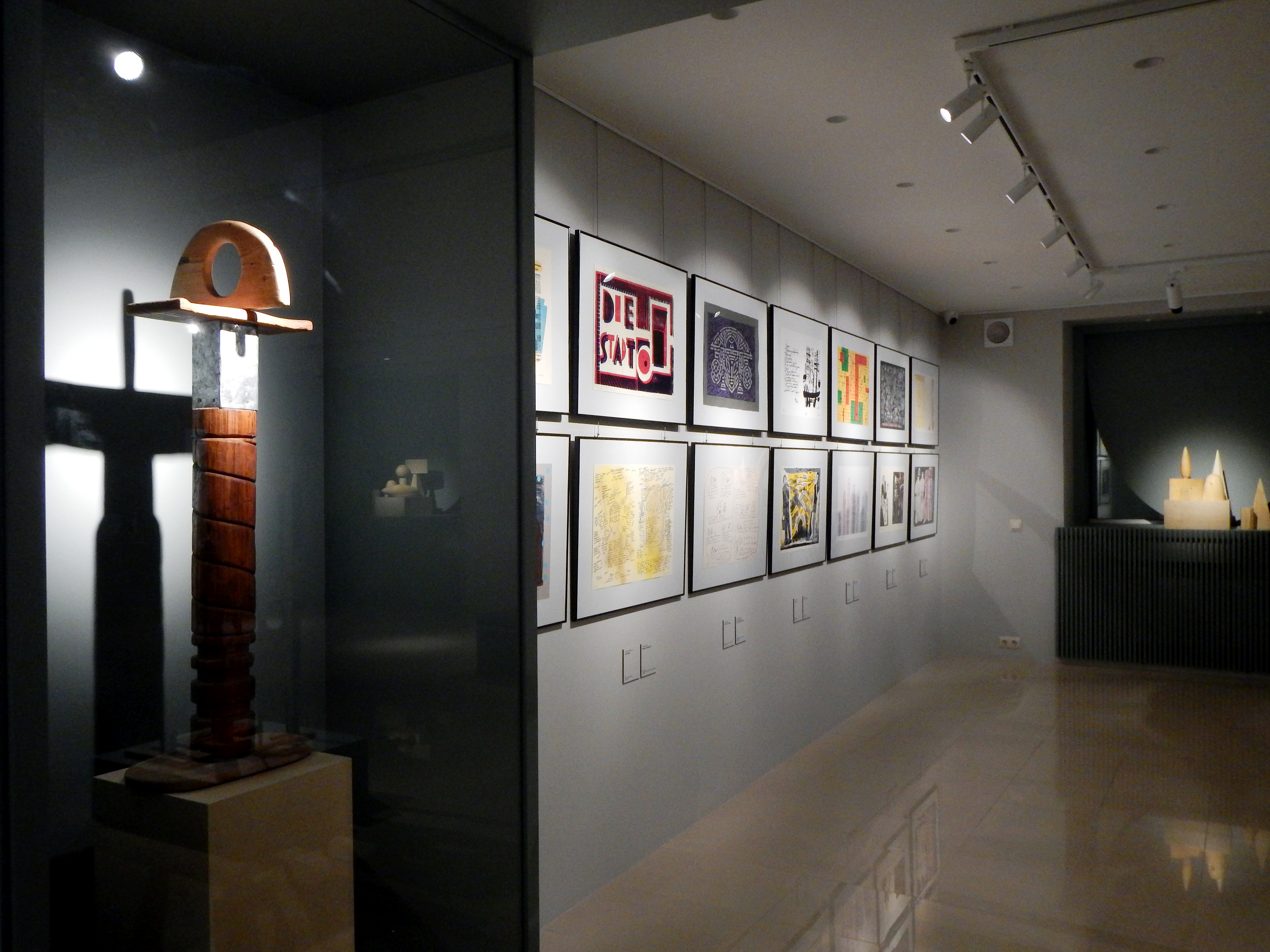
City as an Subjectivity. Exhibition. 2021. Moscow

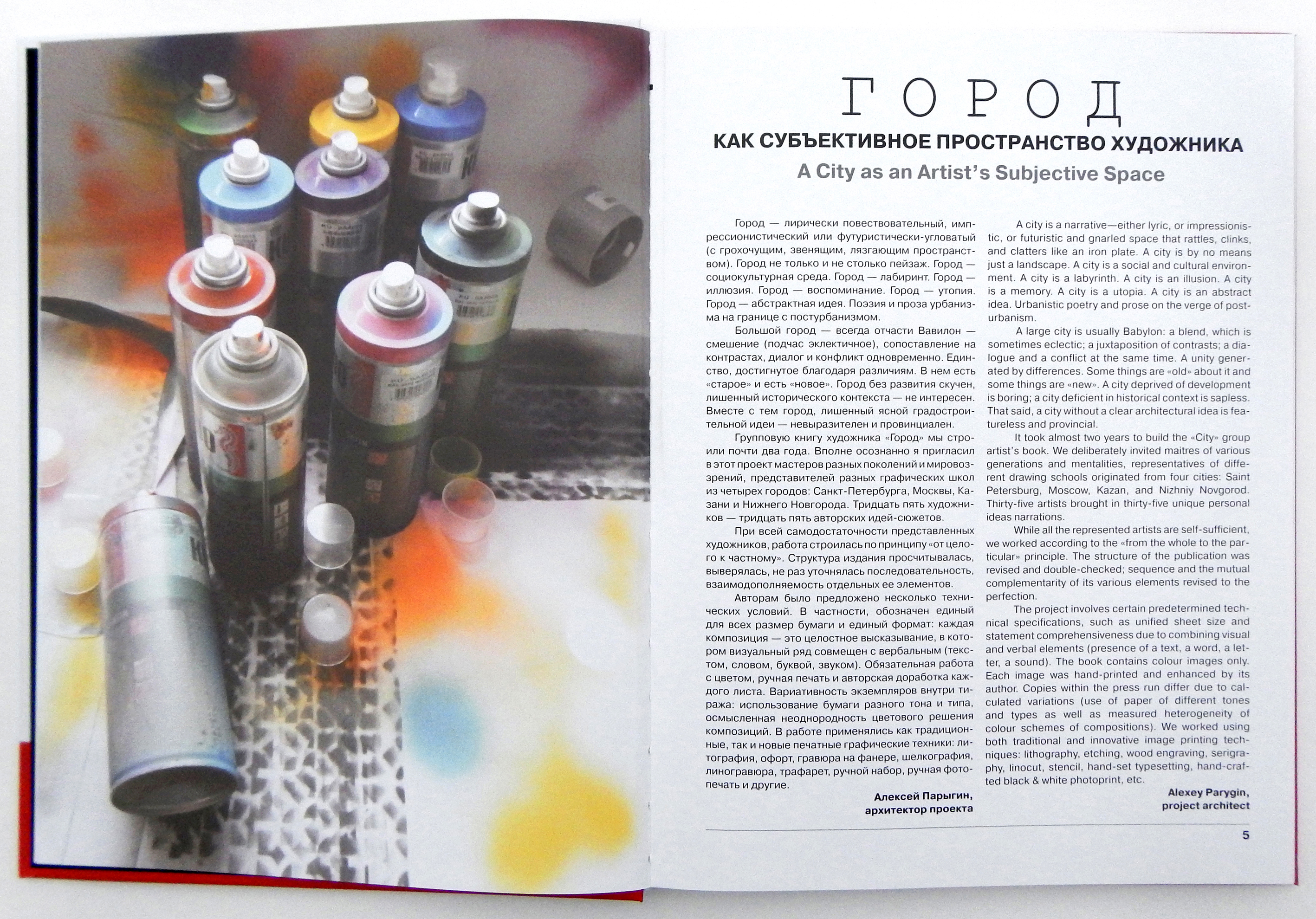
A City as an Artist’s Subjective Space. Catalog. (Rus & En). 2020. ISBN 978-5-906281-32-6

City as an Subjective Space. Animation. 2021

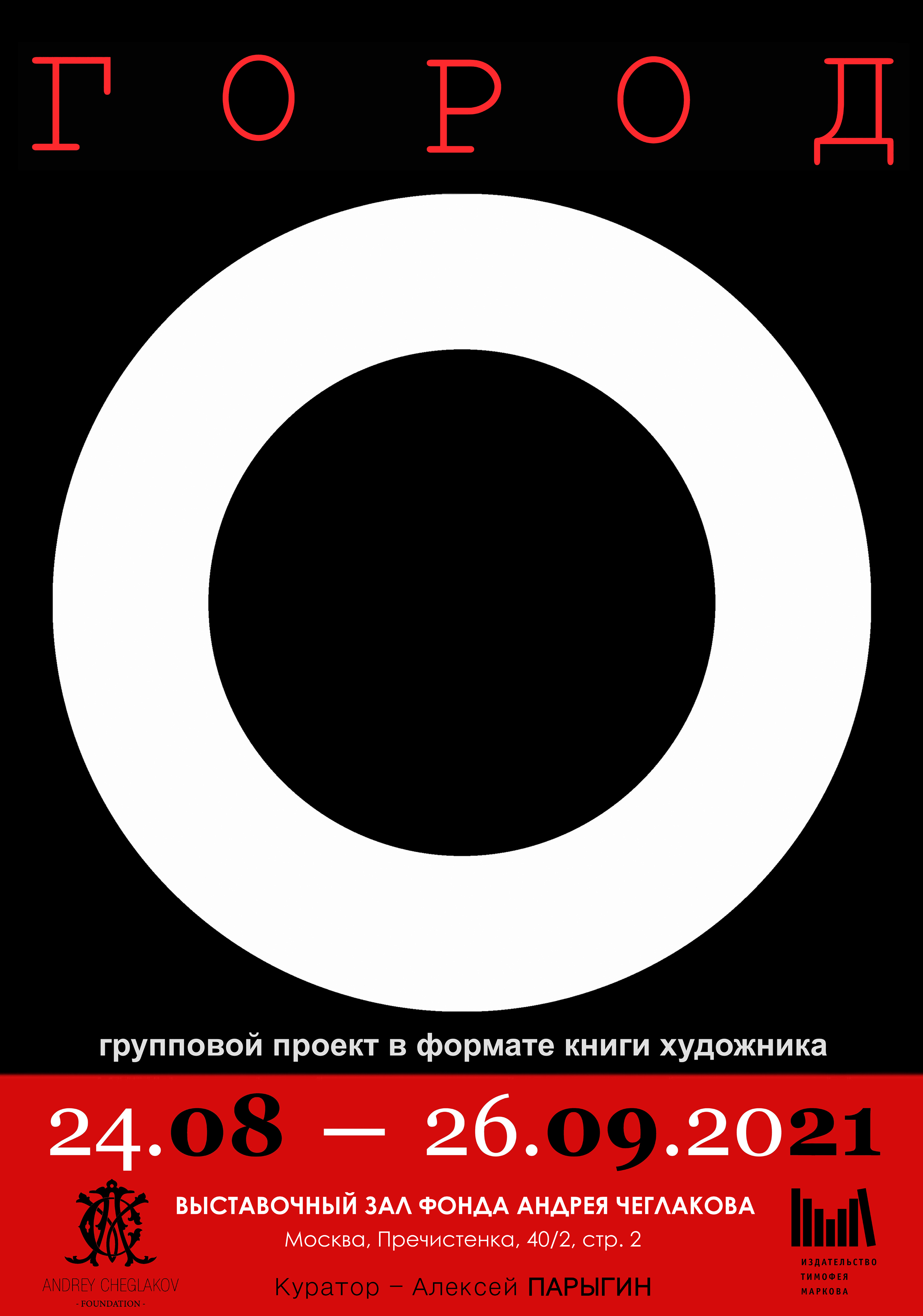
The City. Exhibition poster. 2021

== Key ideas ==
A big city is always partially a Babylon, sometimes an eclectic mixture, juxtaposing contrasts, dialogue and conflict all at once. It is a Unity achieved thanks to our differences. It contains both old and new things. A city without development is dull. A city deprived of its historical context is uninteresting. Moreover, a city without clear urban planning ideas is a toneless backwater....

The project logo is a black circle that outlines the sheet; it appears on the title page of the publication, on the cover of the catalog and on posters for exhibitions. The designer's intent was to create a recognizable symbol of metropolitan life. It is described as a wheel that functions as a minimalistic sign of movement and hermetic completeness. The publication covers a subjective, personally-experienced understanding of the modern metropolis.

== Museum collections and foundations ==
- Hermitage Museum. Hermitage Academic Library/ Rare Books and Manuscripts Sector. (St. Petersburg).—″Instance No. 1″.
- National Library of Russia. Prints Department. (St. Petersburg).—″Instance No. 3″.
- AVC Charity Foundation. (Moscow).
- Garage Museum of Contemporary Art. Library/ Artist's Books Dept. (Moscow).—″Instance No. 7″.
- Pushkin Museum. Science Library/ Rare Books Dept. (Moscow).—″Instance No. 8″.
- Russian Museum. Department of engraving XVIII-XXI centuries. (St. Petersburg).—″Instance No. 18″.
- Yekaterinburg Museum of Fine Arts. (Yekaterinburg).—″Instance No. 36″.
- Van Abbemuseum. LS Collection. (Eindhoven, Netherlands).—″Instance No. 49″.
- Tretyakov Gallery. The Tretyakov Gallery Library. Rare Books Sector. (Moscow).—″Instance No. 54″.

== Exhibitions ==
- NEformat. A Contemporary Artist's Book / Yekaterinburg.—Yekaterinburg Museum of Fine Arts. October 3, December 24, 2025—February 23, 2026.
- The city as an Subjectivity / Kazan.—The State Museum of Fine Arts of the Republic of Tatarstan. Hazine. October 3, 2024—January 19, 2025.
- The city as an Subjectivity / Moscow.—AVC Charity Foundation. Exhibition Center. August 24—October 4, 2021.
- The city as an Subjectivity / St. Petersburg.—Museum of Urban Sculpture in St. New Exhibition Hall. October 23, 2020—February 22, 2021.

== Bibliography ==
- Danilyants T. Communicative strategies of the "artist's book" (Based on the work of Alexey Parygin) // Сборник материалов тринадцатой научно-практической конференции «Трауготовские чтения 2022» / ed. A. K. Kononova.—St. Petersburg: BKG, 2024. 424 pp. 334–343. ISBN 978-5-907889-07-1 (RUS)
- Parygin Al. A City as an Artist's Subjectivity / Artist’s Book Yearbook 2022-2023. Edited by Sarah Bodman.—Bristol: CFPR (Centre for Fine Print Research). University of the West of England, 2022. 292 pp. ISBN 978-1-906501-22-8
- Parygin Al. Reports & Reviews/ A City as the Artist's Subjectivity // Book Arts Newsletter. No. 140. Bristol: CFPR (Centre for Fine Print Research). University of the West of England, 2021, July—August. P. 46–48. ISSN 1754-9086
- Klimova Ek. A City as a Book / Artist’s Book Yearbook 2022-2023. Edited by Sarah Bodman. Bristol: CFPR (Centre for Fine Print Research). University of the West of England. 2022. 292 pp. ISBN 978-1-906501-22-8
- Blagodatov N.I. Субъективные пространства города // Петербургские искусствоведческие тетради, выпуск 67, СПб: АИС, 2021. С. 66–68. ISBN 978-5-906442-31-4
- Koshkina O. Yu. Воодушевлённые городом // Петербургские искусствоведческие тетради, выпуск 67, СПб: АИС, 2021. С. 69–71. ISBN 978-5-906442-31-4
- Grigoryants El. «Город» в формате Artist's book // Петербургские искусствоведческие тетради, выпуск 65, СПб: АИС, 2021. С. 96–100.
- Parygin Al. Город как субъективность художника // Петербургские искусствоведческие тетради, выпуск 64, СПб: АИС, 2021. С. 77–84. ISBN 978-5-906442-28-4
- Savitsky S. Климатическая западня: "Город как субъективность" в Музее городской скульптуры // Деловой Петербург. 2020, 11 декабря.
- City as Artist's subjectivity. Artist's book project. Catalog. Authors of the articles: Parygin A.B., Markov T.A., Klimova E.D., Borovsky A.D., Severyukhin D.Ya., Grigoryants El., Blagodatov N.I. (Rus & En) SPb: Ed. T. Markova. 2020. 128 pp. ISBN 978-5-906281-32-6
- Emme Ek. Художники сыграли в города // Вечерний Санкт-Петербург. 2020, 6 ноября.
- Биосоциальный "город" (интервью с Денисом Ивановым) // Инфоскоп. 2020, ноябрь. No. 271.
- Самойлова А. Город напечатали вручную // Kommersant.СПб. No.196. 2020, 26 октября. С. 20.
- В Петербурге создан крупнейший в мире проект в формате книги художника // Argumenty i Fakty-Петербург. 2020, 20 октября.
- Alekseeva M. Петербуржцам покажут, как выглядит город, глазами десятков художников // Петербургский дневник. 2020, 20 октября.
- Город как субъективность художника // Линия полета. 2020, октября.

== Interview ==
- Город — как комикс, город — как настольная игра, город — как биполярное расстройство. We are talking to the curators of the exhibition — the artist Alexey Parygin and the head of the engraving department of the State Russian Museum Ekaterina Klimova. Radio Komsomolskaya Pravda. Broadcast archive. 2020, October 26. (Rus)

== TV Reports ==
- Ценное приобретение. Lana Konokotina. NTV—St. Petersburg. «Today—St. Petersburg». February 26, 2024. 19:20. (Rus)
- Российские художники рассказали истории о любви и ненависти к городам. Lana Konokotina. NTV—St. Petersburg. «Today—St. Petersburg». October 23, 2020. 19:20. (Rus)
- Выставка книги художника «Город как субъективность» в Музее городской скульптуры. Vyacheslav Rezakov. Saint Petersburg TV. «Cultural Evolution». October 24, 2020. 11:15. (Rus)
- «Книга художника». В Петербурге представили уникальный альбом с изображениями 35 городов России. Saint Petersburg TV. October 24, 2020. (Rus)
- "Город как субъективность" в Музее городской скульптуры. Igor Tsyzhonov. Channel One Russia—St. Petersburg. «Good morning, St. Petersburg!». January 15, 2021. 10:10. (Rus)
- 35 стилей, методов и историй взаимоотношений с городом на Неве. Выставка «Город как субъективность» собрала уникальную Книгу художника. Saint Petersburg TV. «Morning in St. Petersburg». 2020, 26 October. (Rus)

== Selected compositions ==
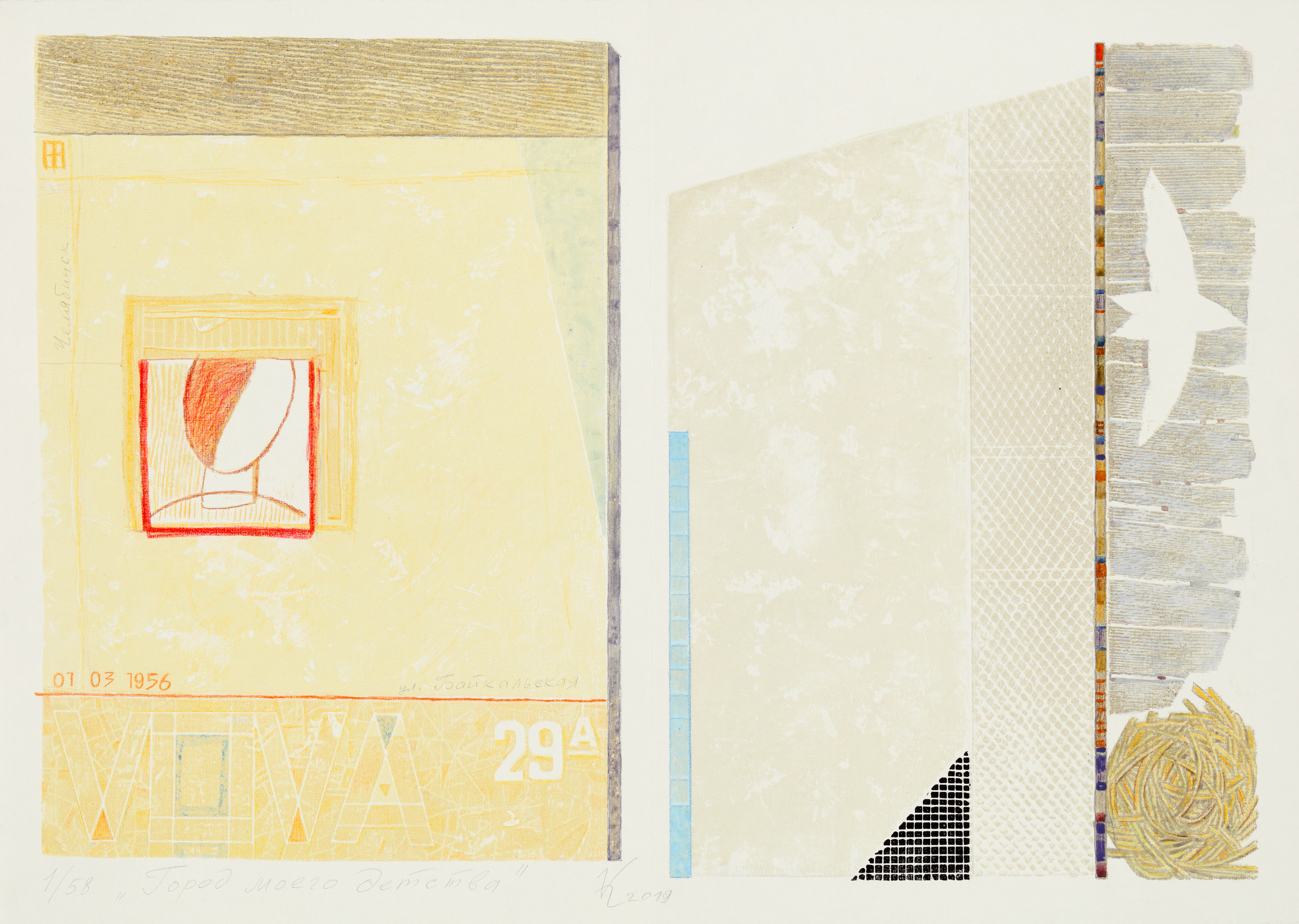

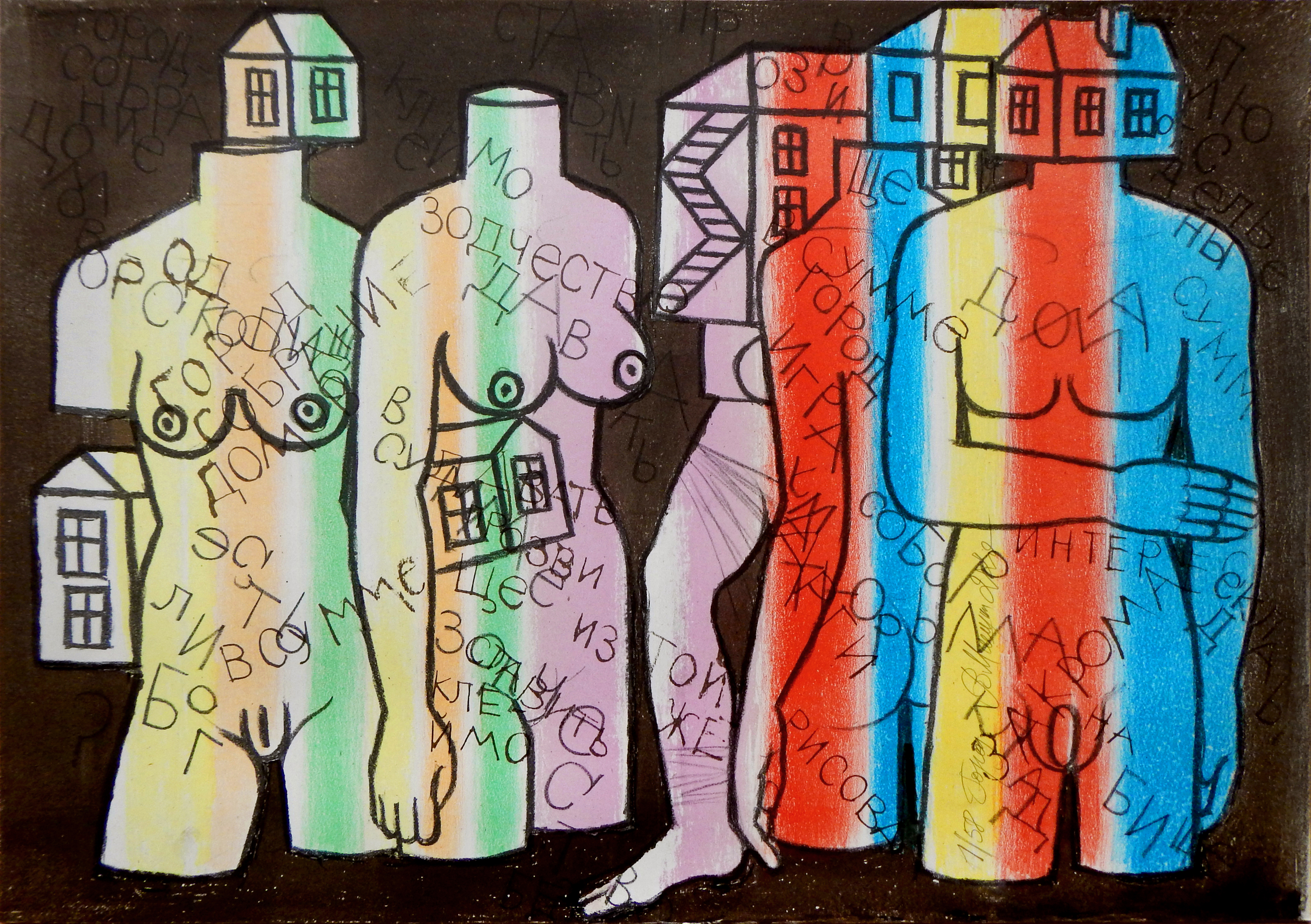

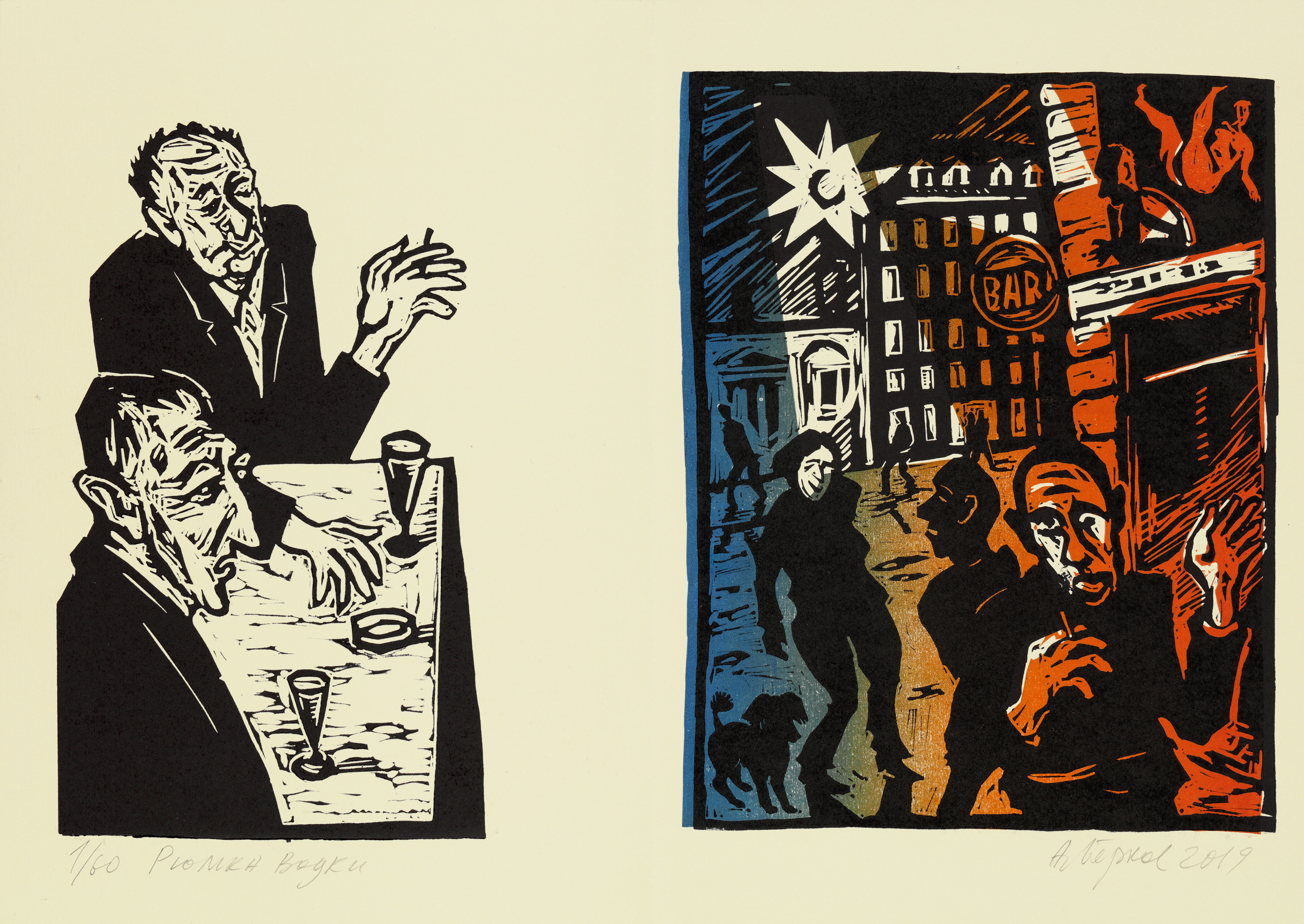

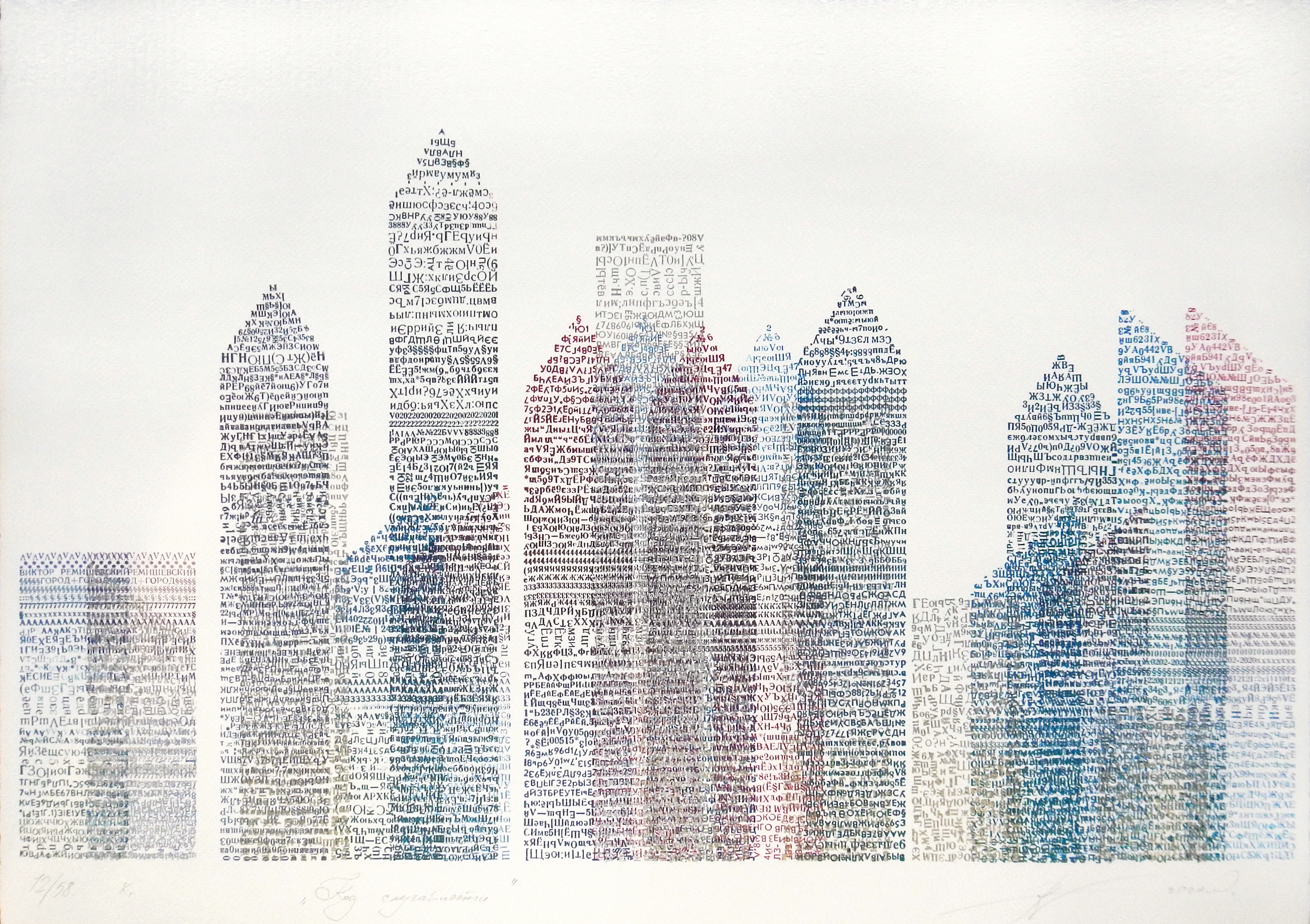

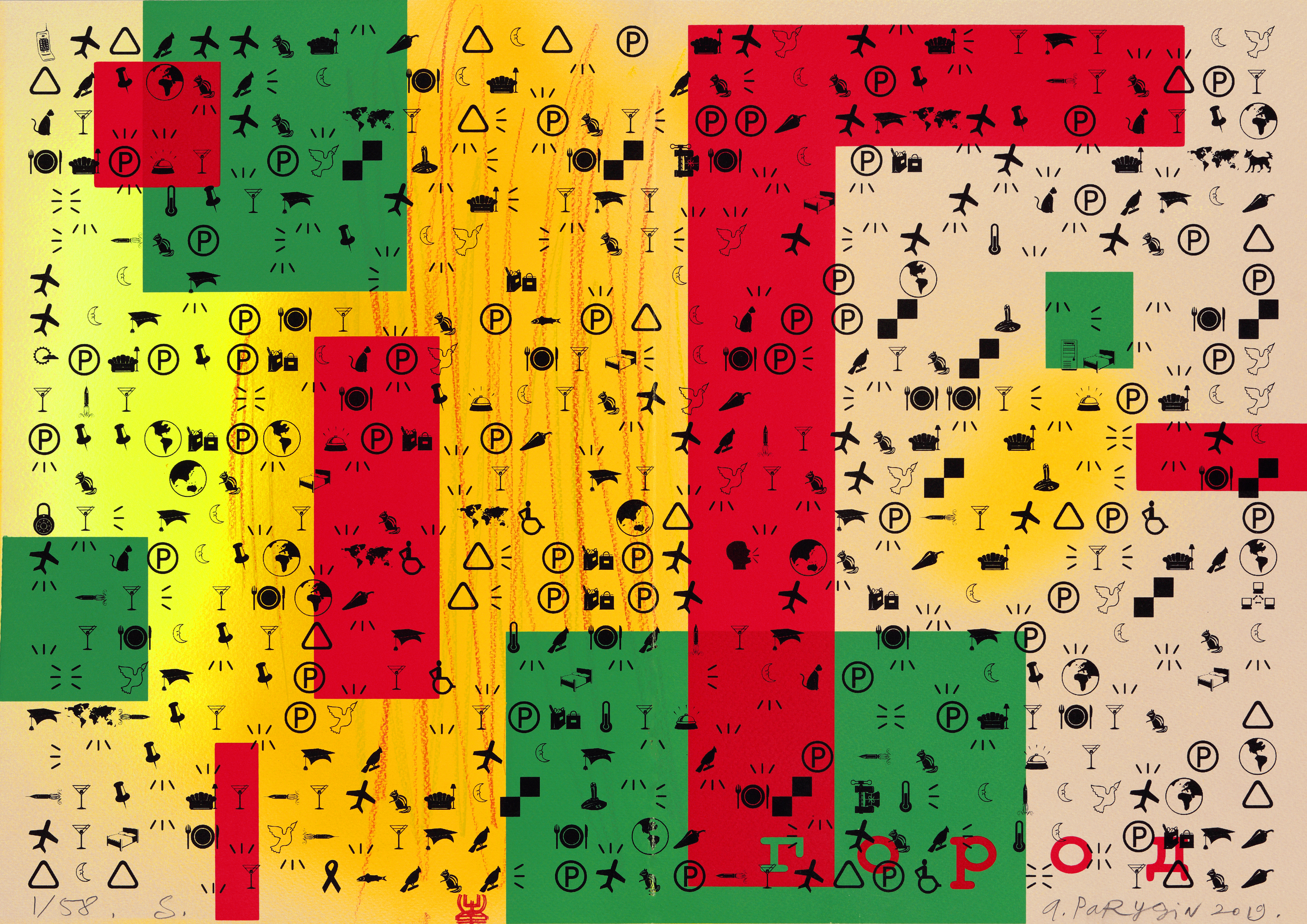
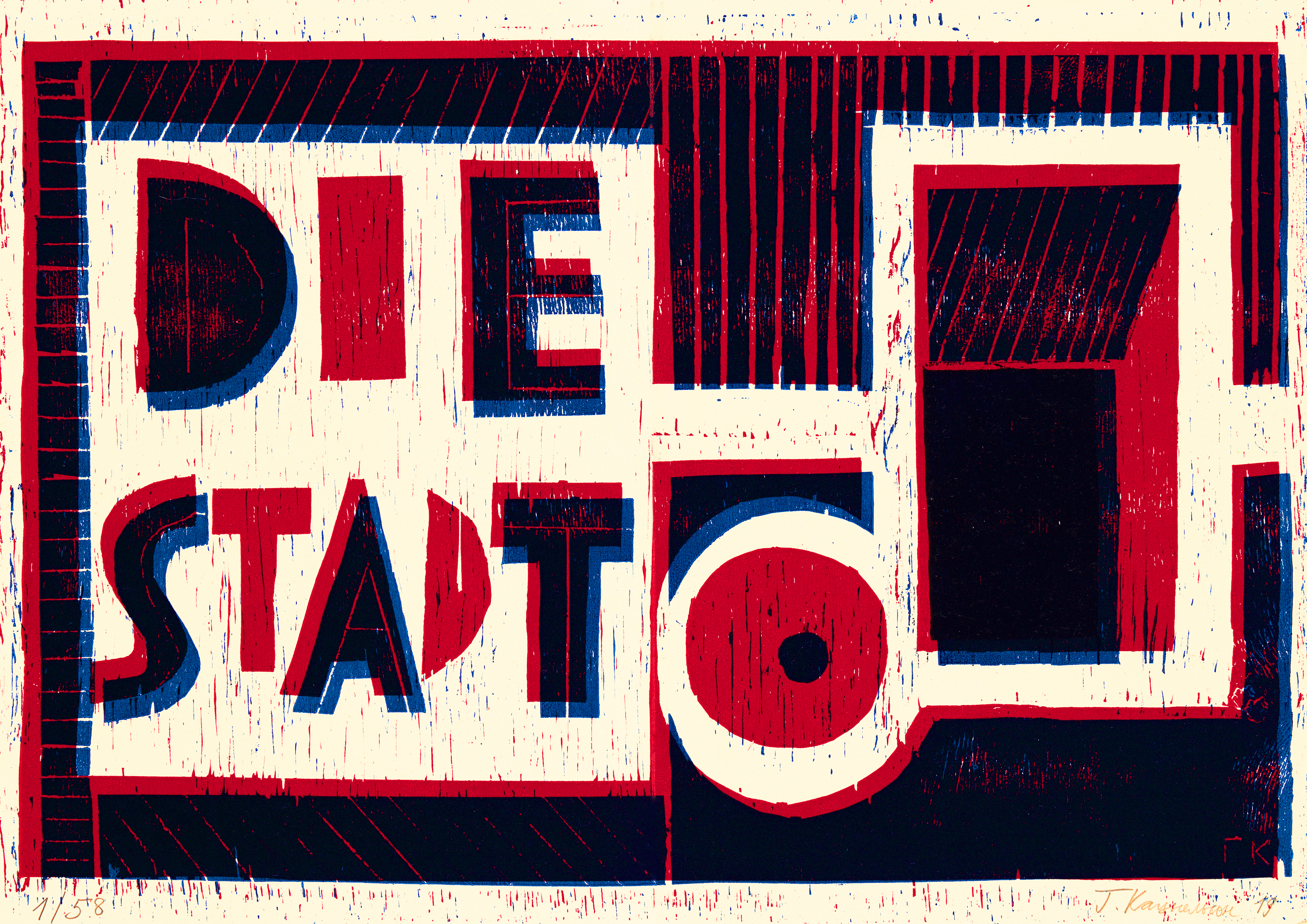

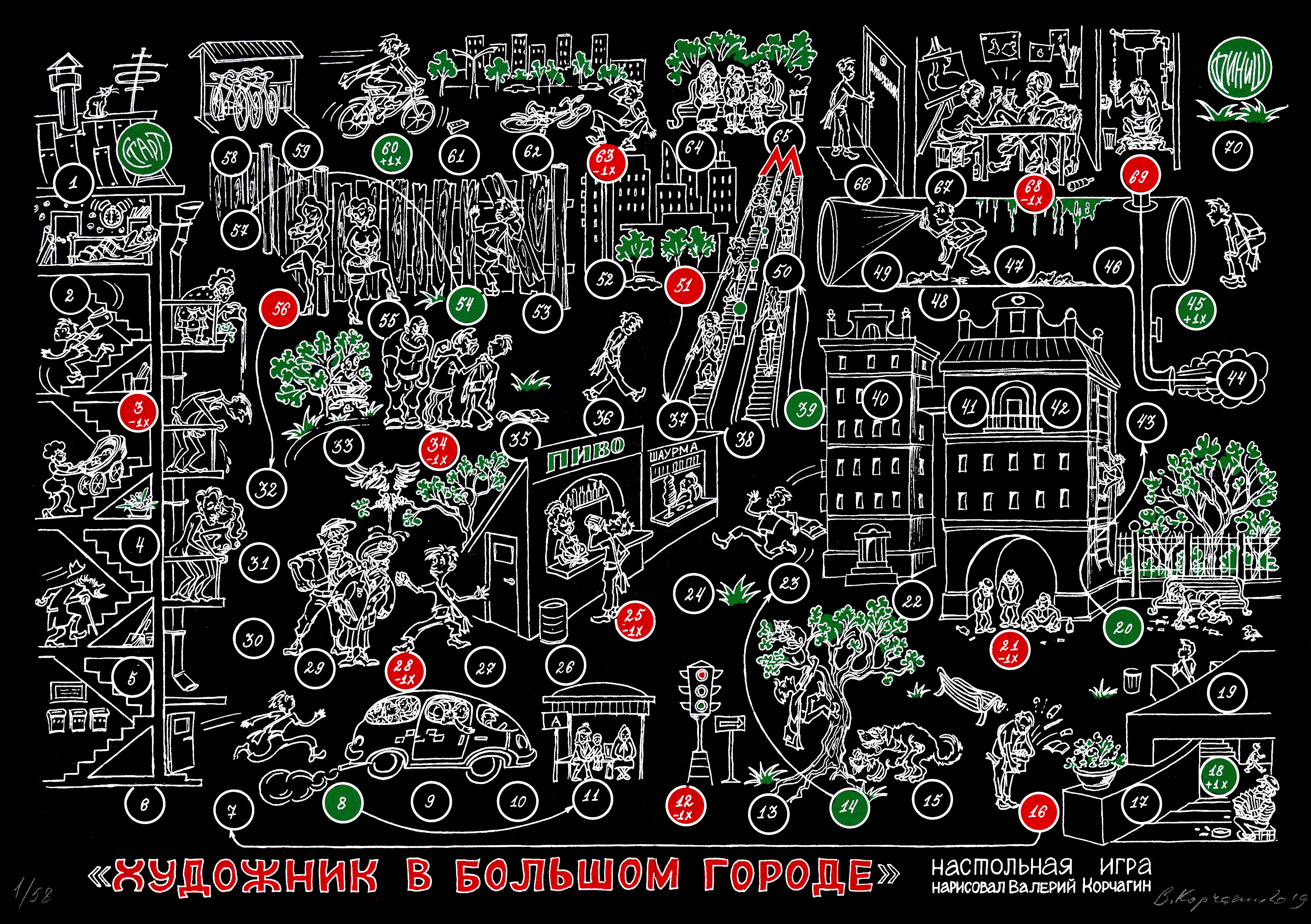

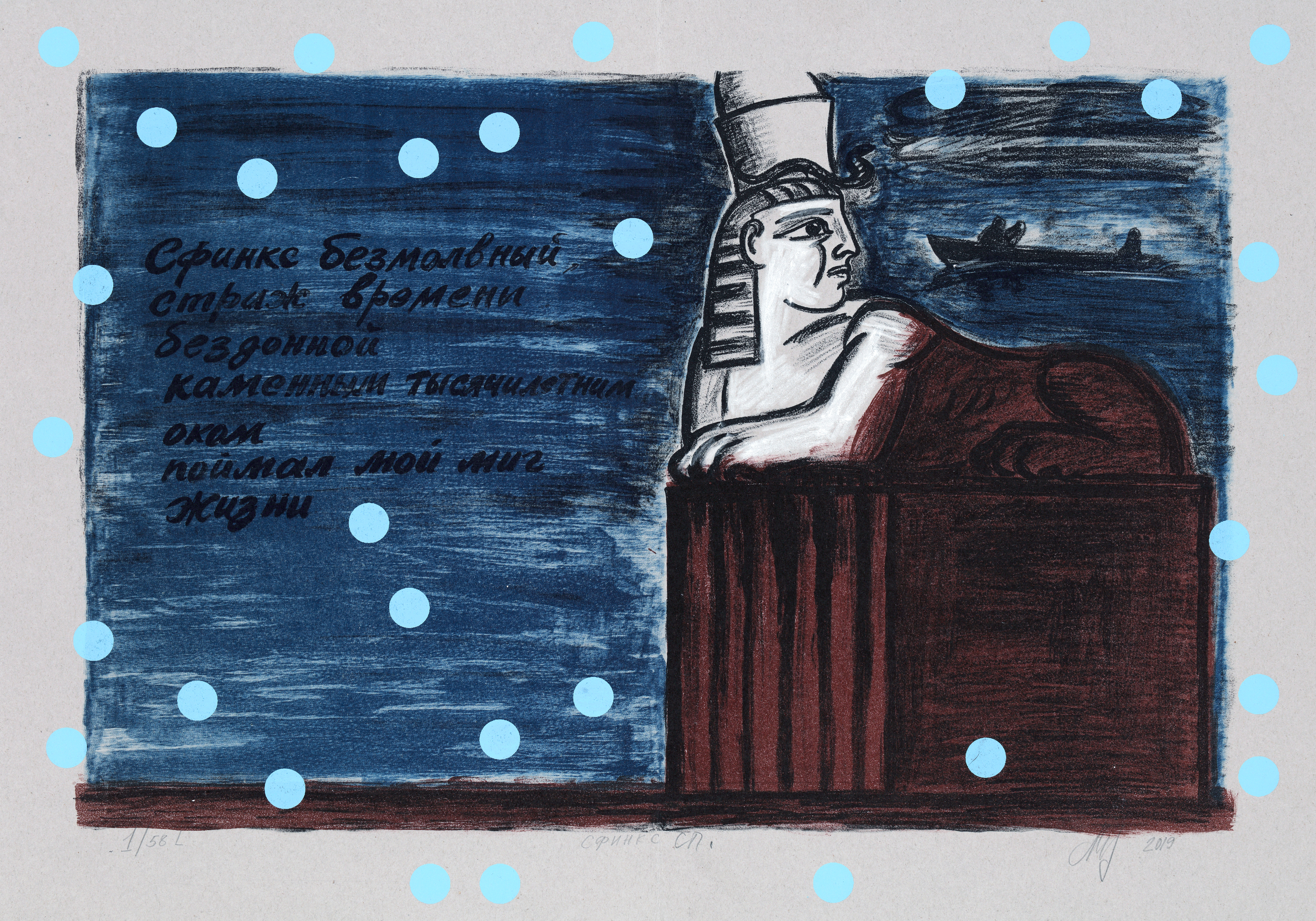

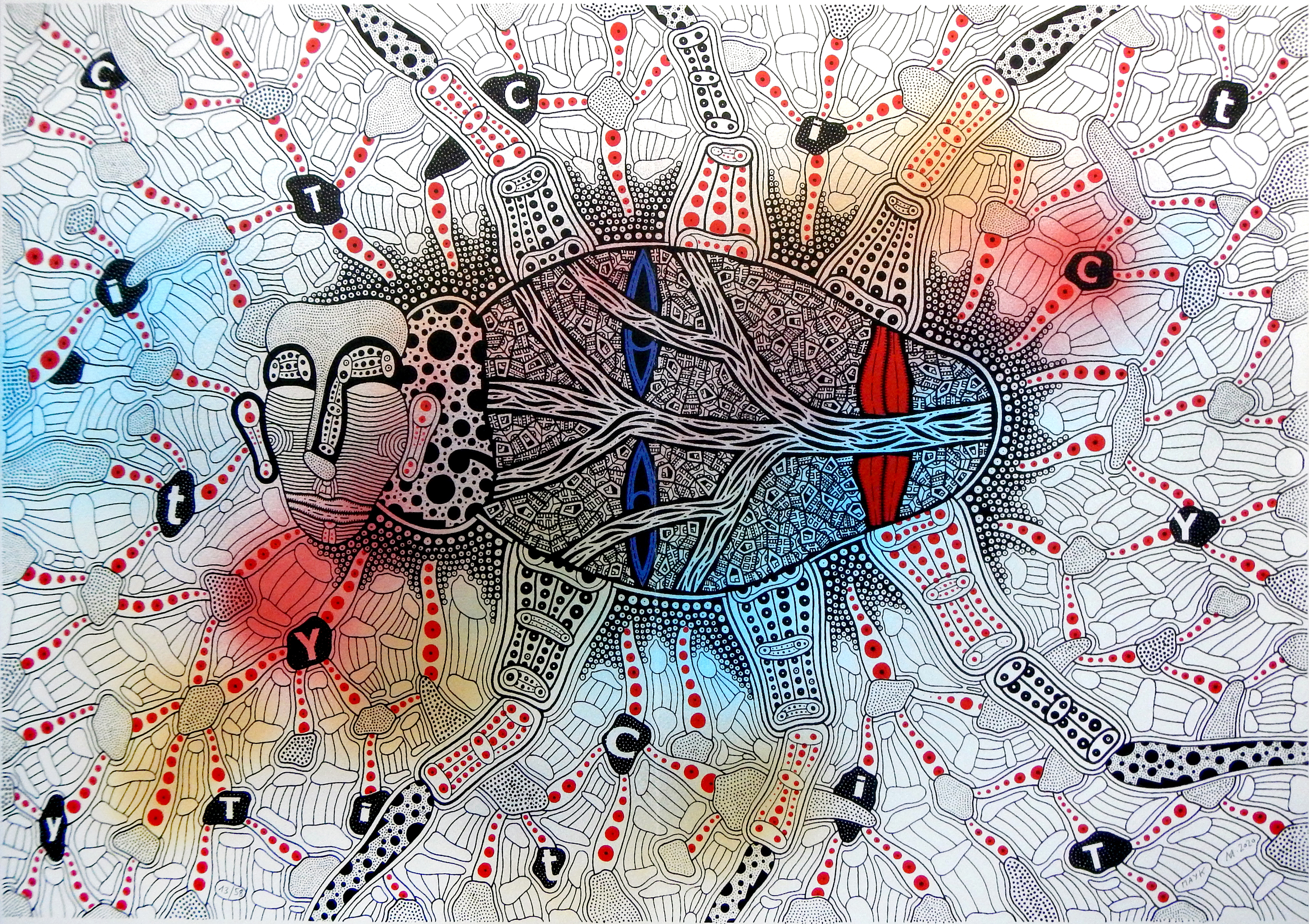

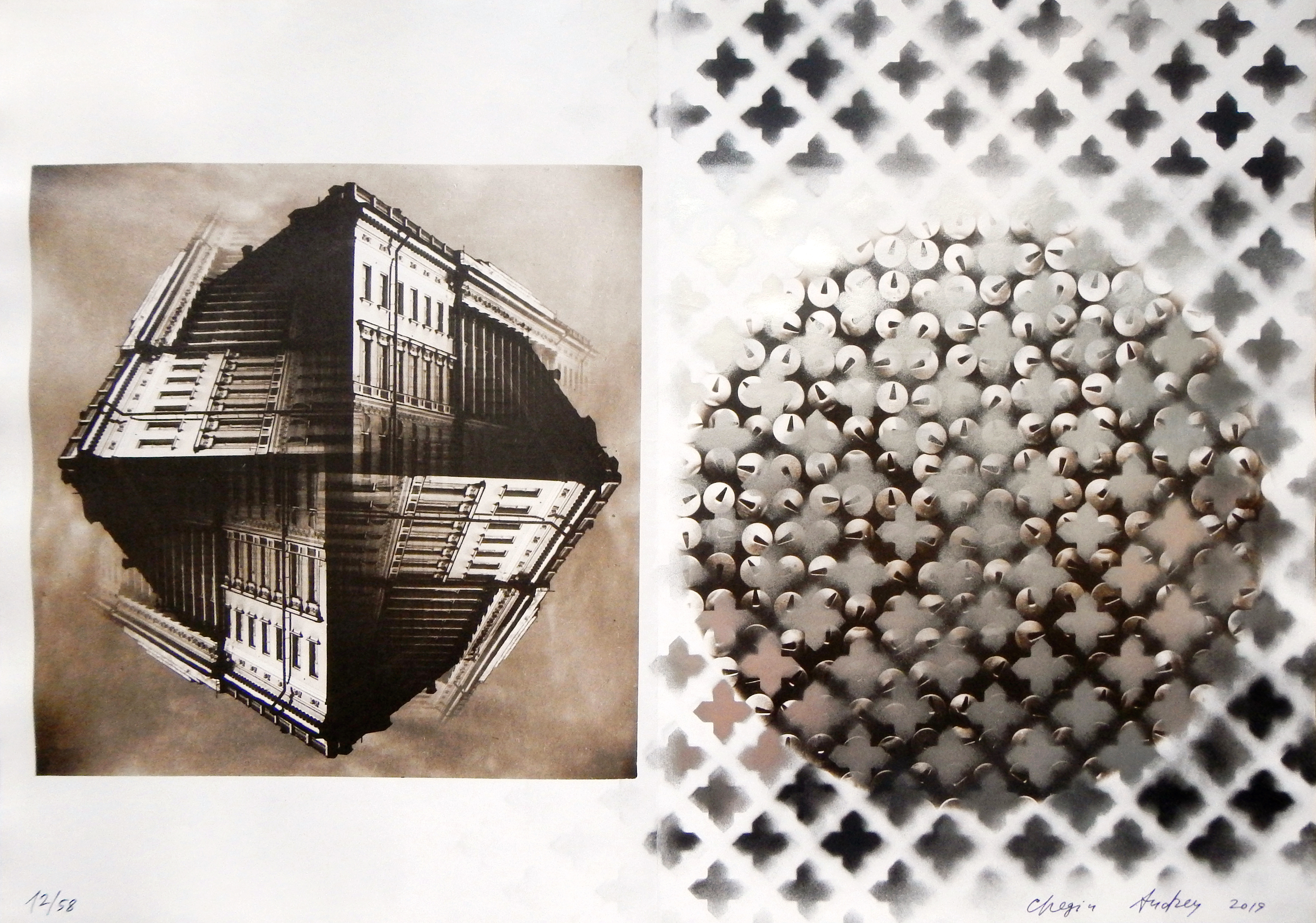
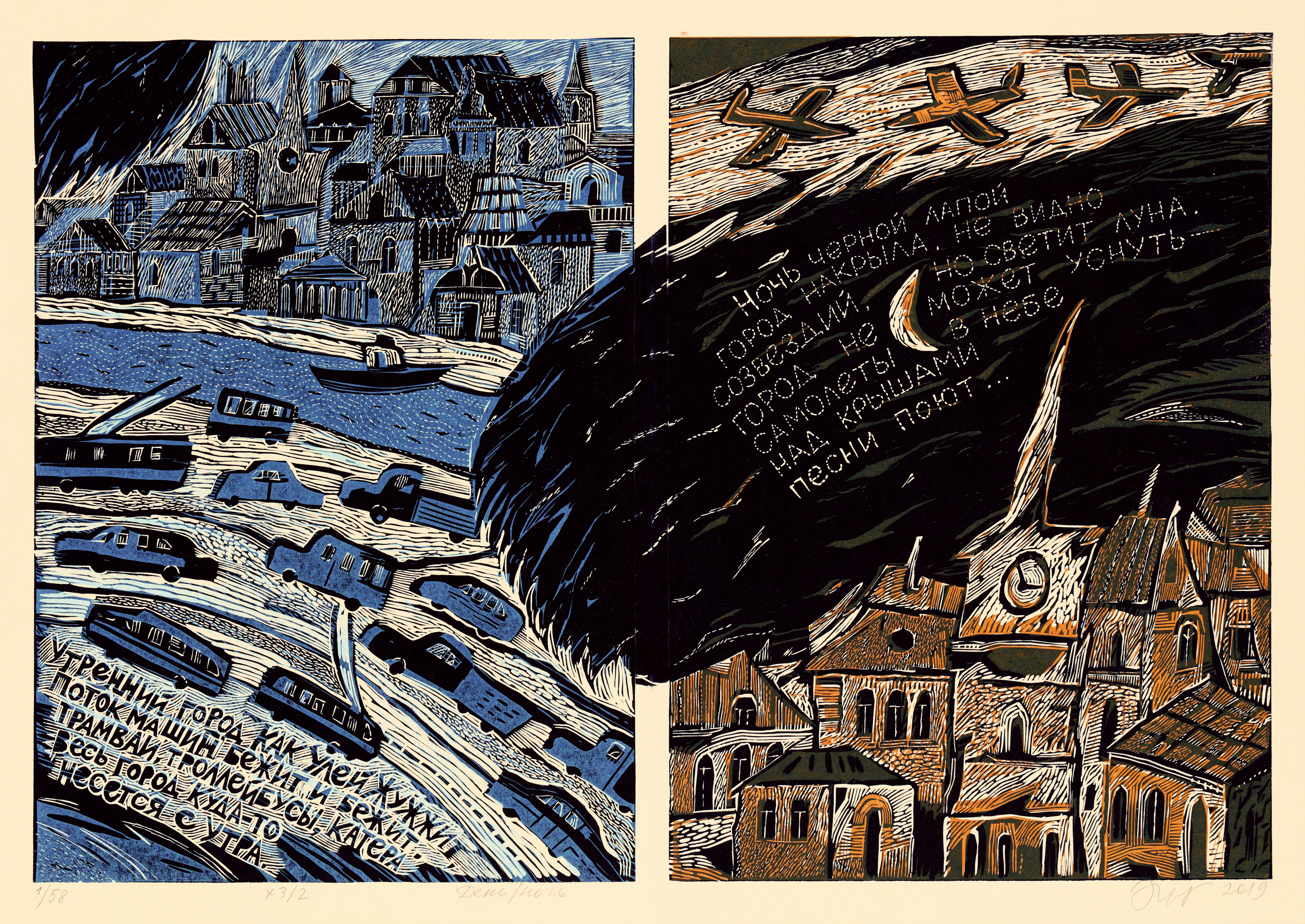

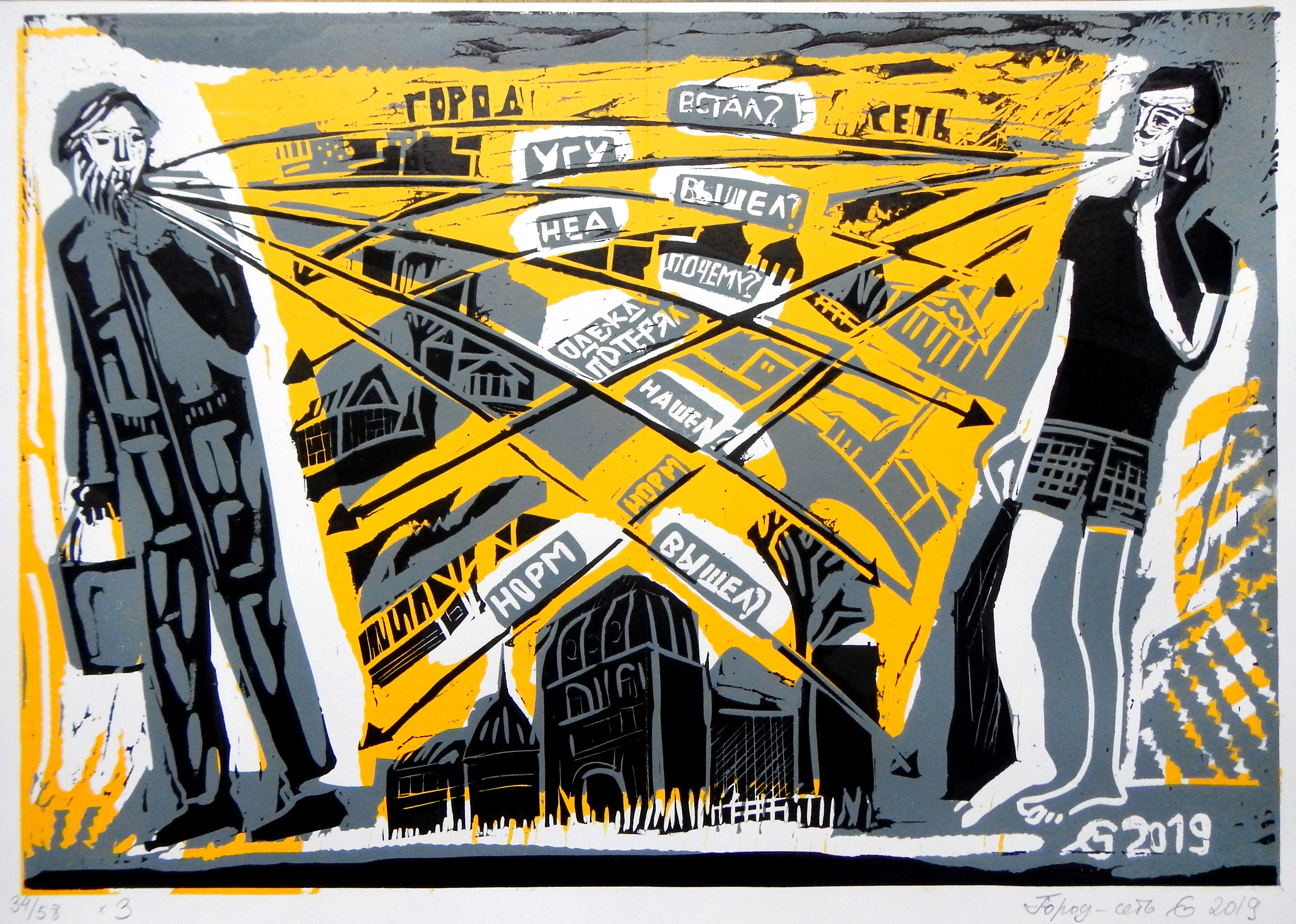

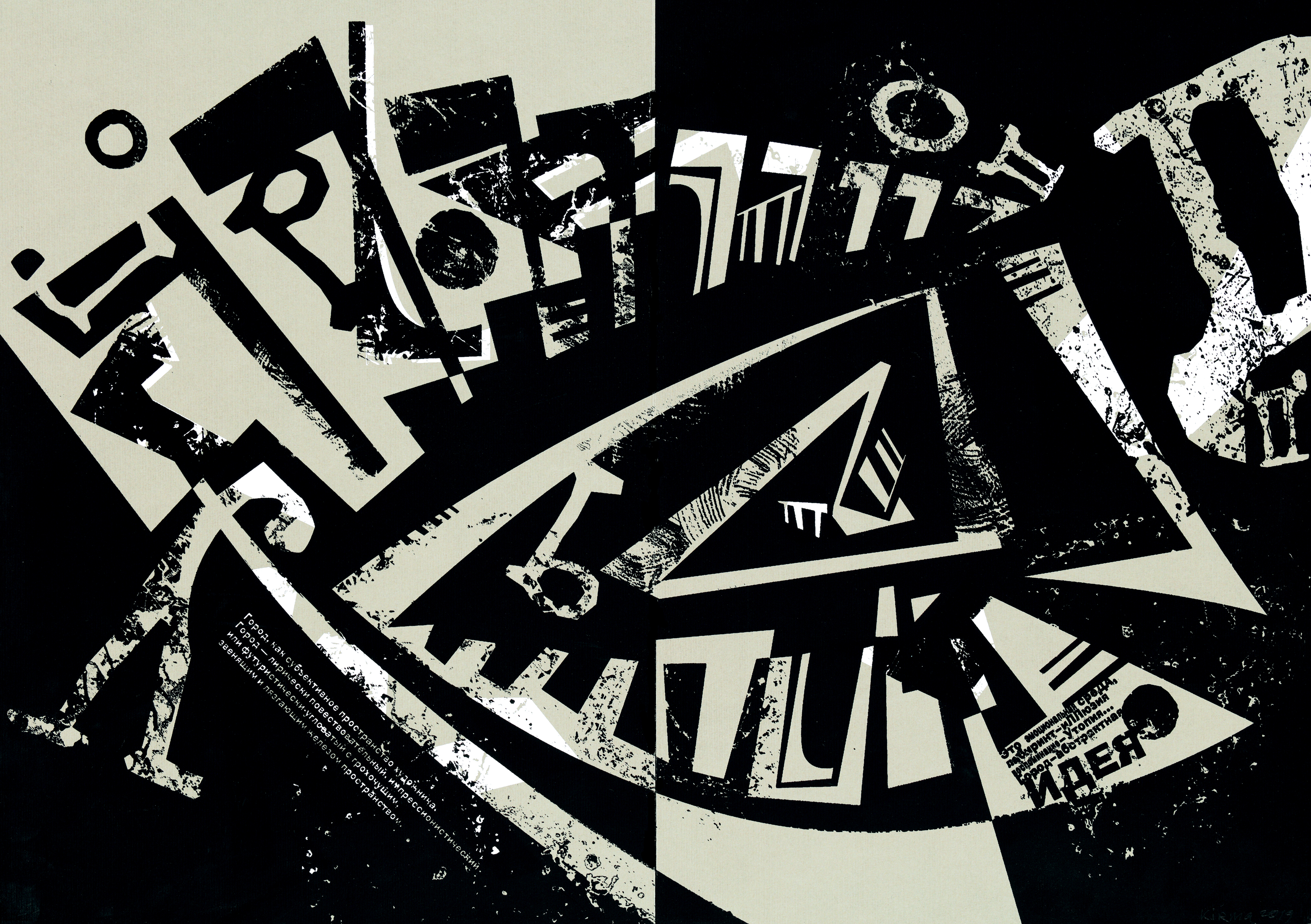

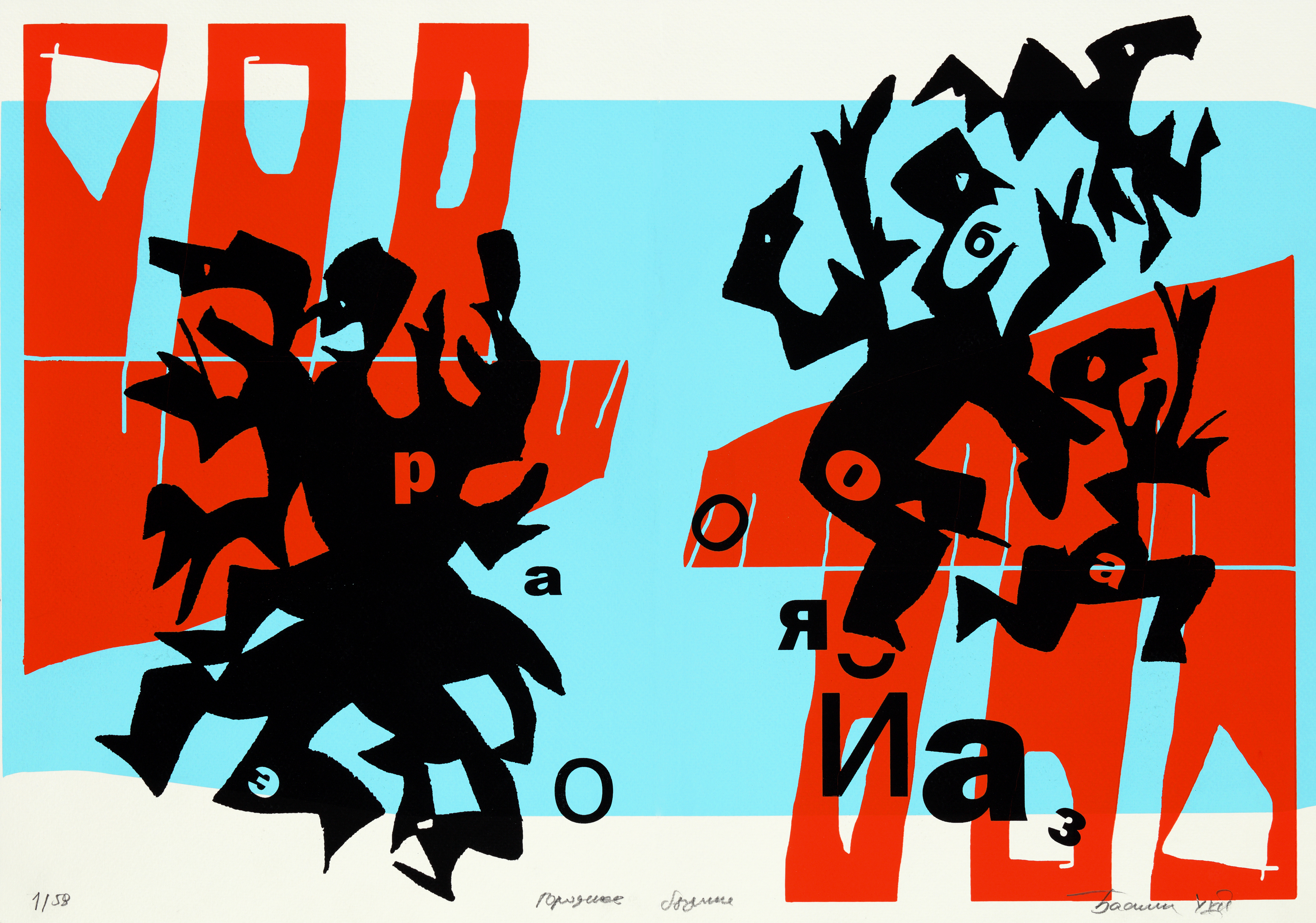

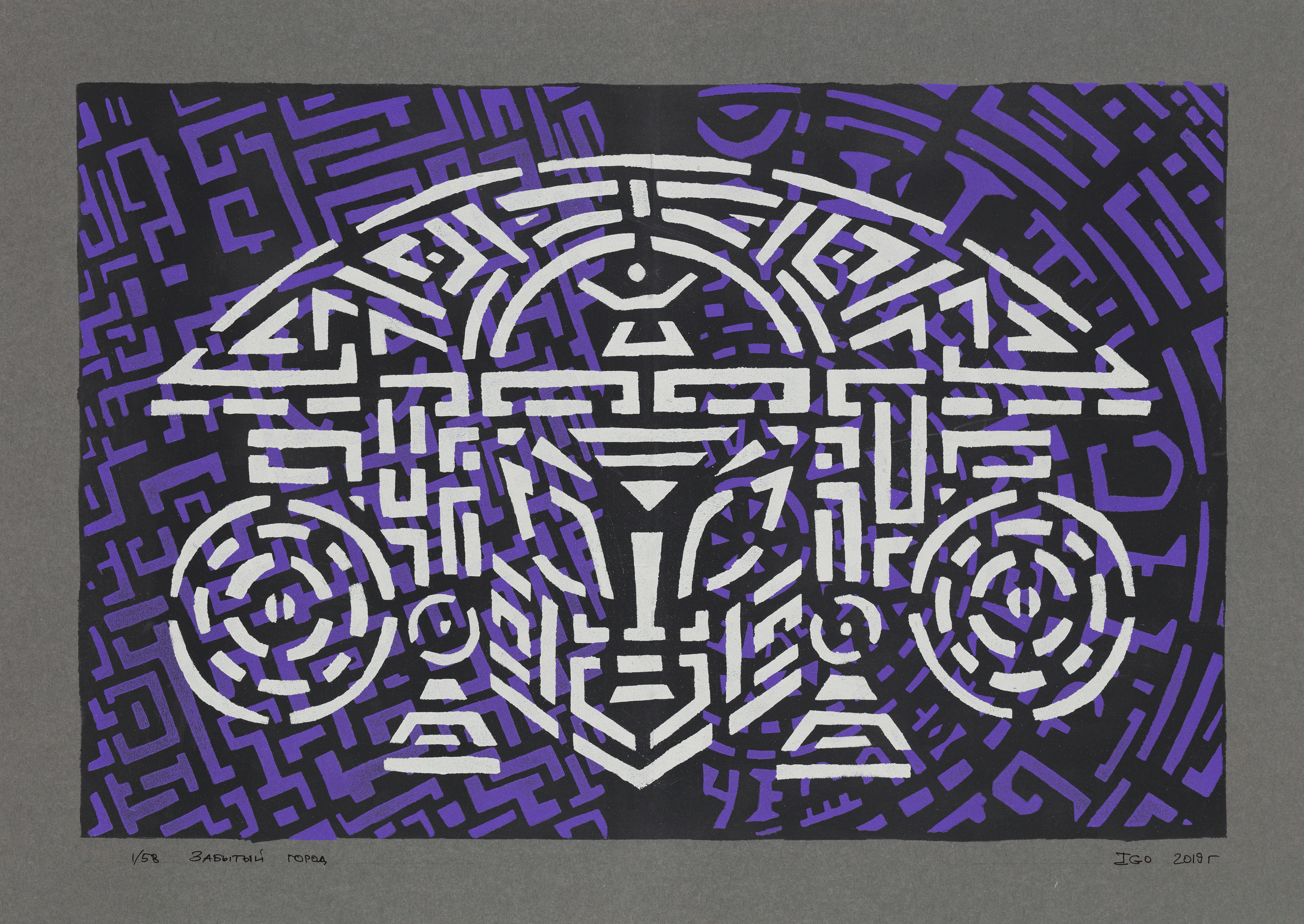
