= Anatoly Vasiliev =

Anatoly Vasiliev may refer to:

- Anatoly Vasiliev (theatre director) (born 1942), Russian theatre director
- Anatoly Vasiliev (painter) (1940–2020), Soviet and Russian painter
- Anatoly Vasilyev (actor) (born 1946), Soviet and Russian film and theater actor
