= Neva (magazine) =

- Editor: Natalia Grantseva (since 2007)
- Former editors: Oleksandr Chernenko (1955-1957), Sergey Voronin (1957-1964), Alexander Popov (1964-1978), Dmitry Khrenkov (1979-1984), Boris Nikolsky (1985-2006)
- Frequency: Once per month
- Total circulation (1994): 26,640
- Founder: JSC
- Founded: 1955
- First issue: April 1955
- Company: Coffee Hall
- Country: Russia
- Based in: St. Petersburg
- Language: Russian
- Website: nevajournal.ru
- ISSN: 0130-741X

Neva is a Russian monthly literary magazine, founded in the Soviet era.

== History ==
The magazine was first published in St. Petersburg in April 1955. It was founded on the basis of yield up to being the "Leningrad almanac" as the official organ of the Leningrad writers' organizations.

In Soviet times, the magazine published works by Mikhail Zoshchenko, Mikhail Sholokhov, Veniamin Kaverin, Lydia Chukovskaya, Lev Gumilyov, Dmitry Likhachov, Aleksandr Solzhenitsyn, Daniil Granin, Fyodor Abramov, Viktor Konetskiy, Arkady and Boris Strugatsky, Vladimir Dudintsev, Vasil Bykaŭ, and others.

In addition to prose, poetry, journalism, and literary criticism, the magazine also printed translations from the literature of the socialist countries, as well as (since 1981) under the heading "Seventh Notebook" - a group of short essays on the history of St. Petersburg and the surrounding areas.

Until 1989, the cover of the magazine featured views of St. Petersburg – drawings and photographs. Since 1989, these have published on the first inside page.

== Circulation ==
- 1958 - 75,000 copies.
- 1963-200 000 copies.
- 1973-260 000 copies.
- 1986-290 000 copies.
- 1989-660 000-675 000 copies.
- 1990-615 000-640 000 copies.
- 1993 - 58 000 copies.
- 1994 - 26,640 copies.

== Authors ==
In the 2000s, their journalists include Eugene Alekhin, Gleb Gorbovsky, Aleksandr Karasyov, Alexander Kushner, Nikolay Blagodatov, Vladimir Lorchenkov, Sergei Pereslegin, Yuri Polyakov, Yevgeni Anatolyevich Popov, Galina Talanov, Igor Nikolayevich, Vladislav Kurash and others.
