= Nikolay Blagodatov =

Soviet and Russian art collector (1937–2026)

- Николай Благодатов
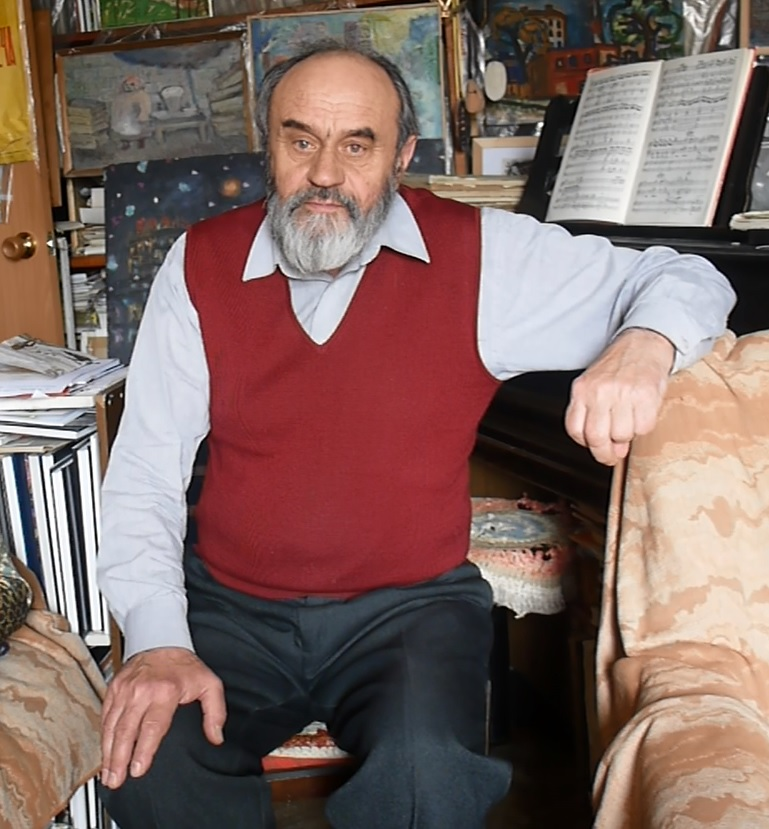
- Blagodatov in 2014
- Born: 21 December 1937; Leningrad, Russian SFSR, Soviet Union
- Died: 23 February 2026 (aged 88)
- Citizenship: Russian
- Occupation: Collector of Soviet Nonconformist Art
- Nikolay Blagodatov's voice Recorded 18 November 2012

Nikolay Innokentievich Blagodatov (Russian: Николай Иннокентьевич Благодатов; 21 December 1937 – 23 February 2026) was a Russian collector of Soviet nonconformist art. He was a member of the Section of Criticism and Art Criticism of the Saint Petersburg Union of Artists.

== Life and career ==
Blagodatov graduated from St. Petersburg State University of Water Communications in 1962. In 1975, he became interested in collecting works of modern art. At the moment, his collection of Soviet Nonconformist Art (1970–1990) is one of the most significant in Russia. From 1979, he wrote articles about art (more than 250 articles). As a collector, organizer and participant of more than 50 exhibitions, including eight personal collections. He was a partner of the Saint Petersburg Union of Artists. He personally met with many representatives of Soviet Nonconformist Art. Blagodatov died on 23 February 2026, at the age of 88.

Conversation with Blagodatov, recorded by I. R. Sklyarevskaya for the Oral History Foundation

== Bibliography (selected) ==
- Subjective spaces of the city. — Petersburg Art History Notebooks, issue 67, St. Petersburg: AIS, 2021. — pp. 66–68. (RUS) ISBN 978-5-906442-31-4
- Blagodatov N. City: Subjective Improvisations / City as an Artist's Subjectivity. Artist's book project. Catalog. Authors of the articles: Parygin A.B., Markov T.A., Klimova E.D., Borovsky A.D., Severyukhin D.Ya., Grigoryants E.I., Blagodatov N.I. (Rus & En) — Saint Petersburg: Ed. T. Markova. 2020. — 128 p. — S. 5. ISBN 978-5-906281-32-6
- Blagodatov N., Herman M., Dmitrenko A.; scientific hands. Petrova E. N. Alexey Stern. Graphics, painting, sculpture: Exhibition catalog (Rus & En). — Saint Petersburg: Palace Editions, 2004. — 144 p.
- Walking with memories // THE! — 2004. — No. 4.
- Art is a search, search is an art. — Neva, No. 2, 2002. — P. 253—255. (RUS).
