= State Catalogue of the Museum Fund of Russia =

State Catalogue of the Museum Fund of Russia (Russian: Государственный каталог Музейного фонда Российской Федерации) (also known as Goskatalog.RU) — a division of The Ministry of Culture of the Russian Federation.

== Feature ==
Regularly updated online catalog. The only electronic database of museum collections in the Russian Federation. Unites all state museums of the Russian Federation. The database contains basic information about each museum object and each museum collection included in the Museum Fund of the Russian Federation.

As of November 2024, the State Catalogue of the Museum Fund of Russia database contains: 3,736 museums; museum items—4,761,949. (There are 870 museums registered in the database; registered museum items—3 485 8933/ for January 2023).
