= Elena Grigoryants =

Russian culturologist

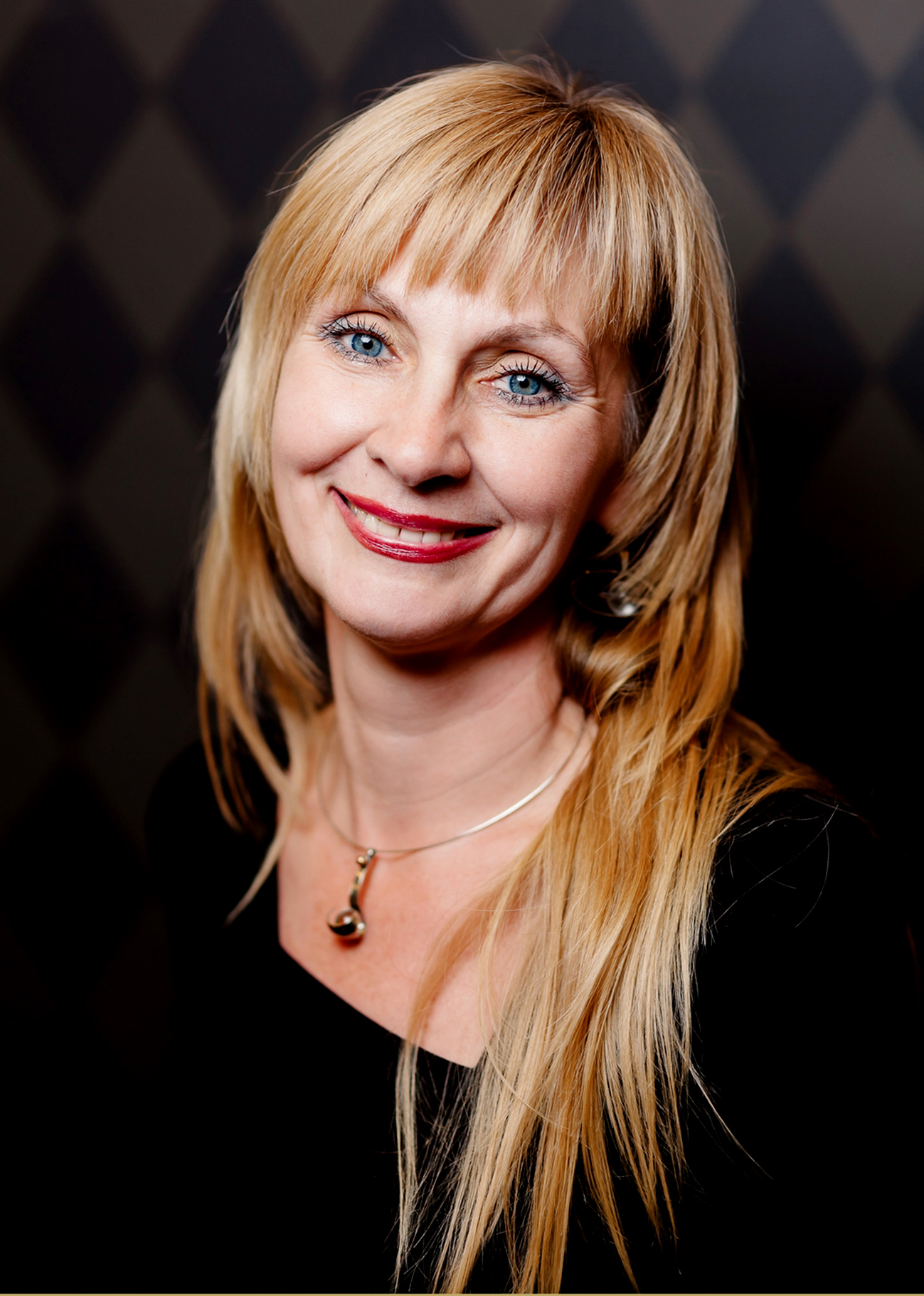
- Born: Elena Igorevna Grigoryants; August 12, 1965 (age 59); Leningrad, USSR
- Education: Saint-Petersburg State University of Culture and Arts
- Known for: Art critic, culturology, curator

Elena Igorevna Grigoryants (Russian: Еле́на И́горевна Григорья́нц; (b. August 12, 1965, in Leningrad) is a Soviet and Russian culturologist, art critic, curator. Associate Professor. PhD in Philosophy, member of Association of Specialists in Art History.

== Biography ==
Elena Grigoryants was born in Leningrad August 12, 1965. Elena studied at the Librarys Faculty of the Saint-Petersburg State University of Culture and Arts from 1983 to 1986. Joined the Art Critics Association (ACA) member (since 2003). PhD in Art History with the thesis "The book in culture" (1993).

Elena Grigoryants the author of more than 200 articles on the history of Russian artist's book, and graphics art, including the artists of St. Petersburg Alexey Parygin, Andrey Korolchuk, Georgy Kovenchuk, and (P. Veshchev, E. Gindper, S. Koltsov, Yu. Yu. Klever, M. Klodt, A. Korzukhin, N. Koshelev, Ya. Krestovsky, O. Kotelnikov, M. Karasik, G. Katsnelson, Yu. Lyukshin, G. Lavrenko, A. Molev, A. Florensky, V. Shinkarev and others) for the German academic directory Allgemeines Künstlerlexikon Die Bildenden Künstler aller Zeiten und Völker (AKL).

Elena Grigoryants lives and works in St. Petersburg.

== Bibliography ==
- Алексей Парыгин. Постурбанизм: знаки в пространстве идей.—Interview with Elena Grigoryants // Авансцена. 2023 (11), December, No. 3, 4. 195 p.—pp. 148–155. Circulation–2000 copies. (Rus) ISSN 2712-7982 ISBN 978-5-907685-39-0
- City as Artist's subjectivity. Artist's book project. Catalog. Authors of the articles: Parygin A.B., Markov T.A., Klimova E.D., Borovsky A.D., Severyukhin D.Ya., Grigoryants E.I., Blagodatov N.I. (Rus & En) — SPb: Ed. T. Markova. 2020. — 128 p. ISBN 978-5-906281-32-6
- Grigoryants El. The Futurist Tradition in Contemporary Russian Artists’ Books // International Yearbook of Futurism Studies / Special Issue on Russian Futurism. Ed. by Günter Berghaus.—Walter de Gruyter. Vol. 9—2019, 520 p.—pp. 269–296 ISBN 978-3-11-064623-8.
- Grigoryants El. В мастерской Алексея Парыгина «Невский—25» // St. Petersburg art notebooks, # 38, St. Petersburg: AIS, 2015, pp. 88–92. (Rus)
- Grigoryants El. Искусство книги и книга в искусстве // Первая Балтийская биеннале искусства книги: каталог выставки.—СПб., 2014.—С. 6–9. (Rus)
- Grigoryants El. Образ текста в современной петербургской «книге художника» и livre d`artiste // Печать и слово Санкт-Петербурга: Сборник научных трудов. Ч.1 — СПб., 2014. (Rus)
- J. J. Klever // Allgemeines Künstlerlexikon. Band 80 – 2013, 540 S.—Walter de Gruyter.
- A. I. Korzuchin; O. Kotel’nikov; N. A. Koselev; J. I. Krestovskiy; S. V. Kol’cov // Allgemeines Künstlerlexikon. Band 81 – 2013, 540 P.—Walter de Gruyter.
- Grigoryants El. «Автографическая книга» в рамках направления «Artists book» («книга художника» // XX век. Две России — одна культура: Сборник научных трудов по материалам 14 Смирдинских чтений. — СПб, 2006. (Rus)
- Grigoryants El. Диалоги культур в современной петербургской книге художника // Книжная культура Петербурга: Сборник научных трудов по материалам 13 Смирдинских чтений. — СПб: СПбГИК, 2004. (Rus)
- Grigoryants El. «Книга художника» в современном петербургском искусстве // Актуальные проблемы теории и истории библиофильства: Материалы 8 международной научной конференции. — СПб., 2001 — С. 124–128. (Rus)
- Grigoryants E. I. Images by Alexei Parygin // St. Petersburg Panorama, 1993, No. 3.—P. 11. (RUS).
