= Alexey Parygin =

Russian painter

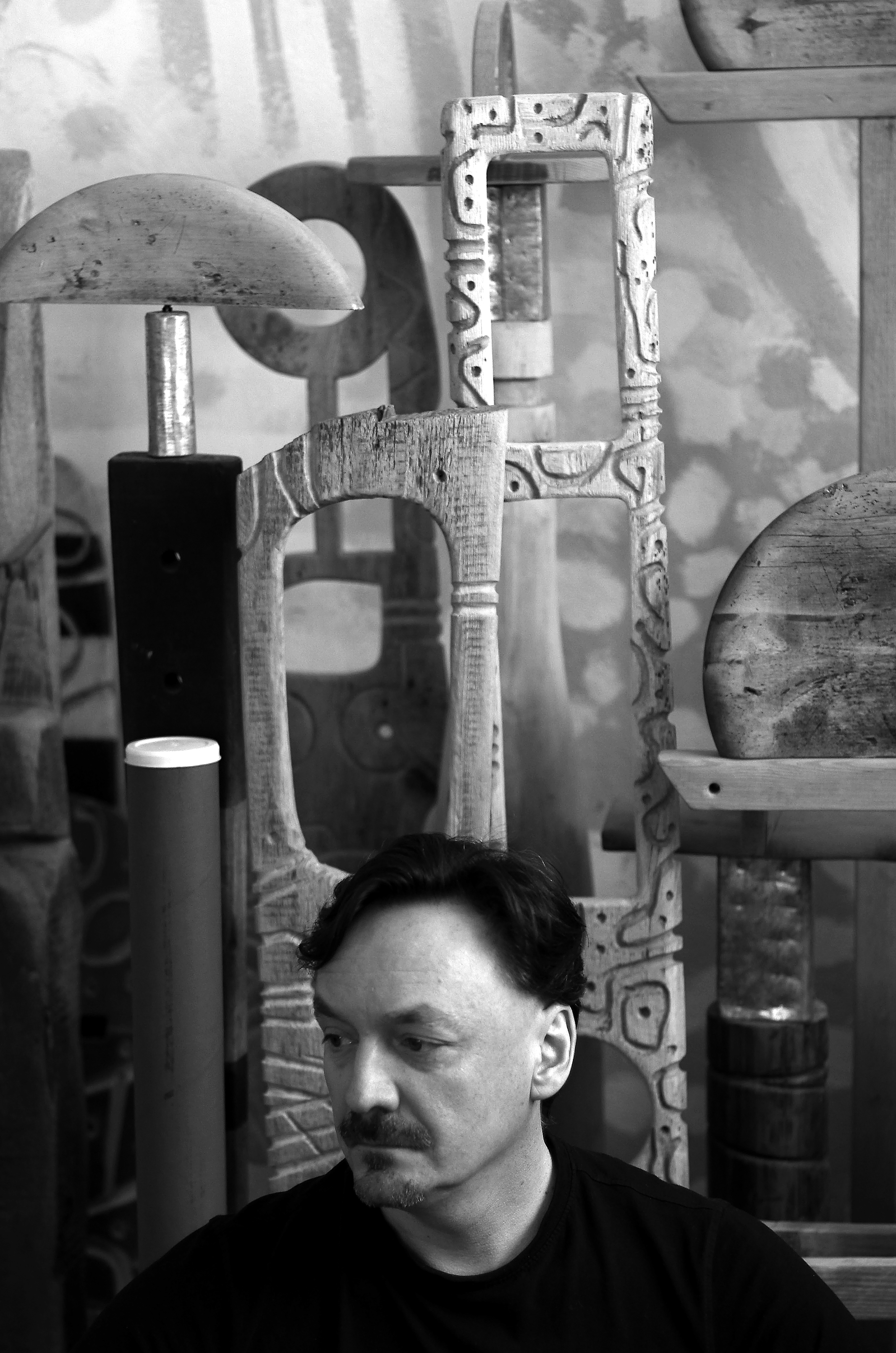
- Al. Parygin in his workshop. SPb. 2015
- Born: Alexey Borisovich Parygin; December 2, 1964 (age 61); Leningrad, Soviet Union
- Education: Herzen University
- Known for: Contemporary art, Painting, Graphics, Artist's book
- Movement: arts

Alexey Borisovich Parygin (Russian: Алексе́й Бори́сович Па́рыгин; born December 2, 1964) is a Soviet and Russian artist, philosopher, art historian, art theorist and curator. He is the author of several philosophical art projects, including Contemplation of Money (1997–2000), Art is a Business (2000–2015), Art in the Forest (2000–2005), City as an Artist's Subjectivity (2019–2020), Posturbanism Art Project (since 2005).

== Biography ==
Alexey was born in Leningrad 2 December 1964. His father Boris Parygin was a social psychologist. Alexey studied at the graphics faculty of the Herzen University from 1982 to 1989. He organized the art group “Union № 0” in Leningrad in 1986–1989 and created the art squatters’ workshop “Nevsky-25” in Leningrad in 1987–1990. Joined the Professional Artists’ Union of Russia in 1994. Member of the Bureau of the Graphics Section (since 2019), and member of the Board of the Saint Petersburg Union of Artists (since 2022). The Art Critics Association (ACA) member since 2003. PhD in Art History with the thesis Silk Screening as a phenomenon of the 20th Century art (2002).

Since the mid—1980s, the artist perfected printed graphic technics of serigraphy, linocut, woodcut, lithography, cardboard engraving and collagraphy). The artist's works are in many museum collections in Russia (State Catalogue of the Museum Fund of Russia) and the world. The artist lives and makes art in his workshop at the Benois House (St. Petersburg, Russia).

=== The nature of creativity ===
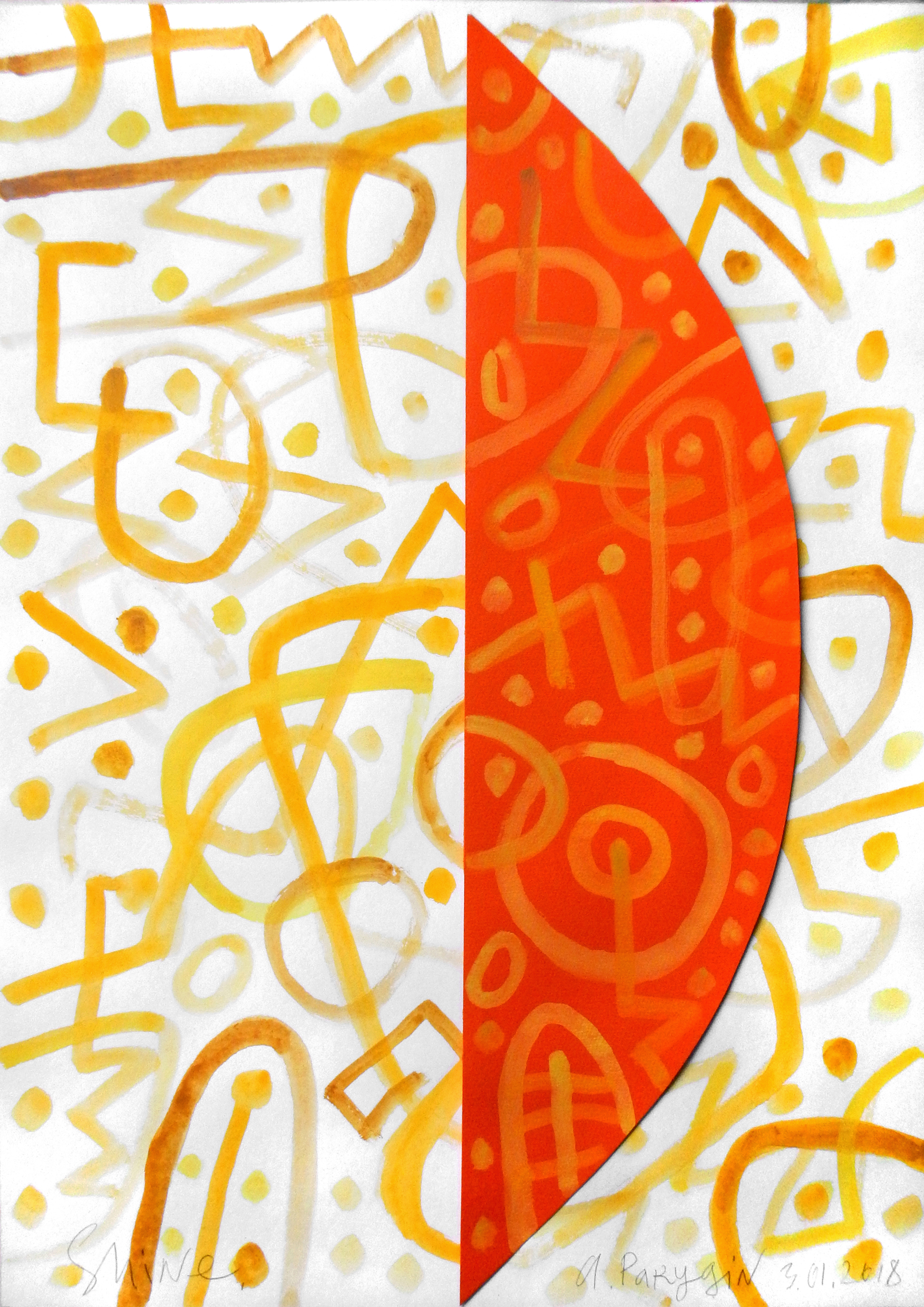
The Shine. 2018, paper, watercolor

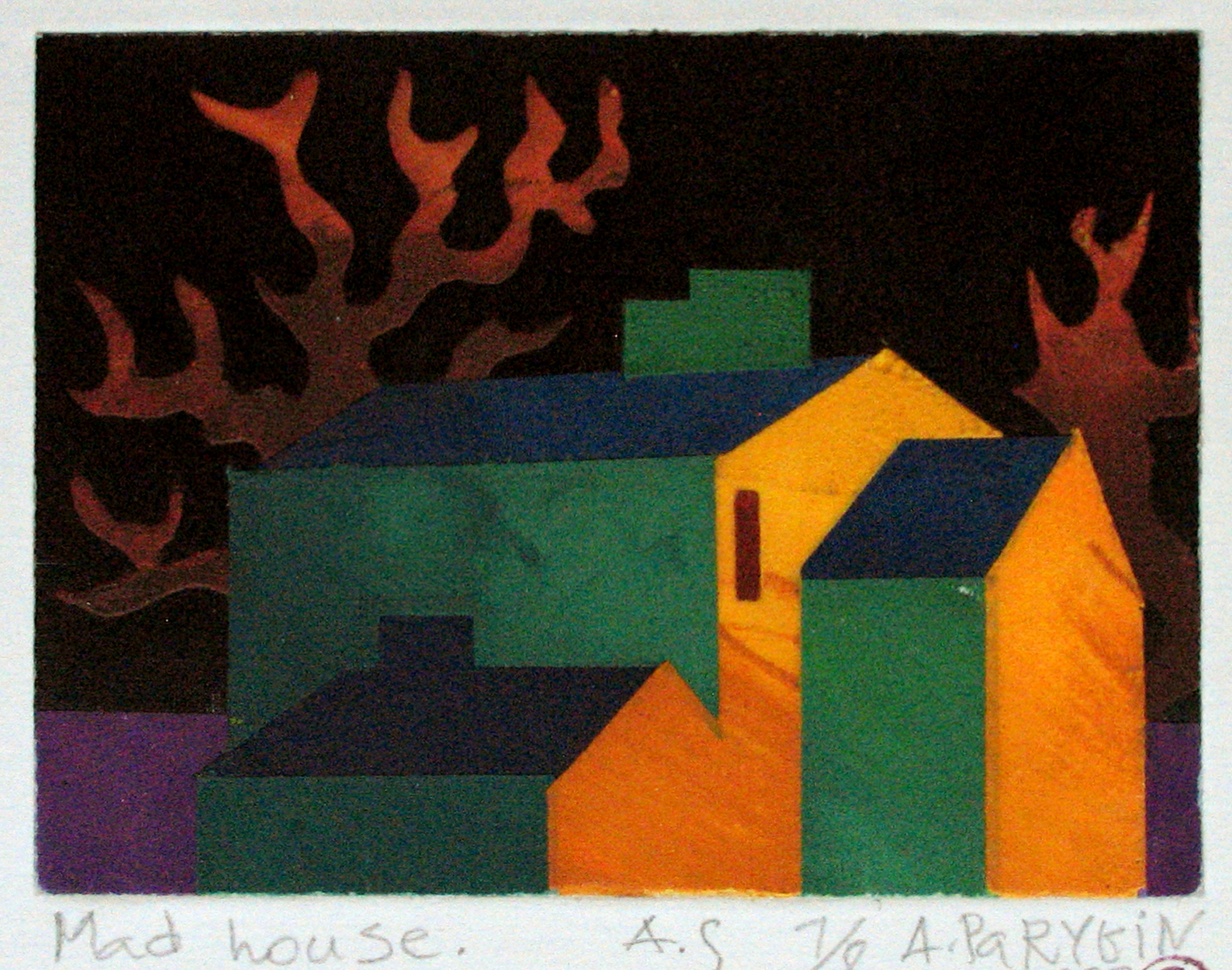
Mad House. 1987, paper, serigraphy

In 1980-1990 Parygin concentrated on easel oil painting outside and using models at the studio, experimented with various paint foundations such as canvas, plywood, glass and other media and used texture and relief techniques.

From Aleksandr Kamensky’s article (1988):

The works create new poetry, which involuntarily rivals with habitual esthetic stereotypes. For instance, we accept as a common notion to worship joyously the classic beauty of St. Petersburg, its harmony and stately grandeur. This exposition does have variations of that sort. But observe “Night Nevsky” by Parygin. Rough to the touch texture, dark abyss. In the darkness urgent lights explode. They bring forth immediate spiritual angst. One does not regard the regal magnificence of the urban landscape-it is neither cast aside, nor left behind the curtains, as dramatism of modern perception takes over. One regards not a city museum for curious crowds, but one beholds the habitat of our days where we seek, love, fight, suffer. That art defines perception...

From Mikhail German’s article (1991):

...from my point of view, a very serious, worthy and professional exhibition. It's nice that there is a solid culture of color, ...there is a persistent desire to express their feelings of life, their artistic vision.

From the middle of the 90-ies the artist’s main studies subject matter and experiments became signs and sign systems as communicative link of the contemporary society. From 1997 the artist created a series of extended multimedia projects Contemplation of Money, Art is a Business, Art in the Forest.

From Nikolay Blagodatov's article (2002):

His works show high culture, erudition and taste, it is hard to favor any particular piece. Moreover, the artist prefers options on a particular plastic theme, as he himself puts it. He uses various in techniques, and revisits it in different periods of creativity. He believes his plastic theme conveys the plastic state. The state arises and manifests in very different ways, yet retaining its basic sign. Perhaps this art form blends both the sign and its notion.

Since 2000, Parygin has been developing the utopian concept of the form of art after the death of art—Posturbanism Art Project / PostUrbanism.

=== Artist's books ===
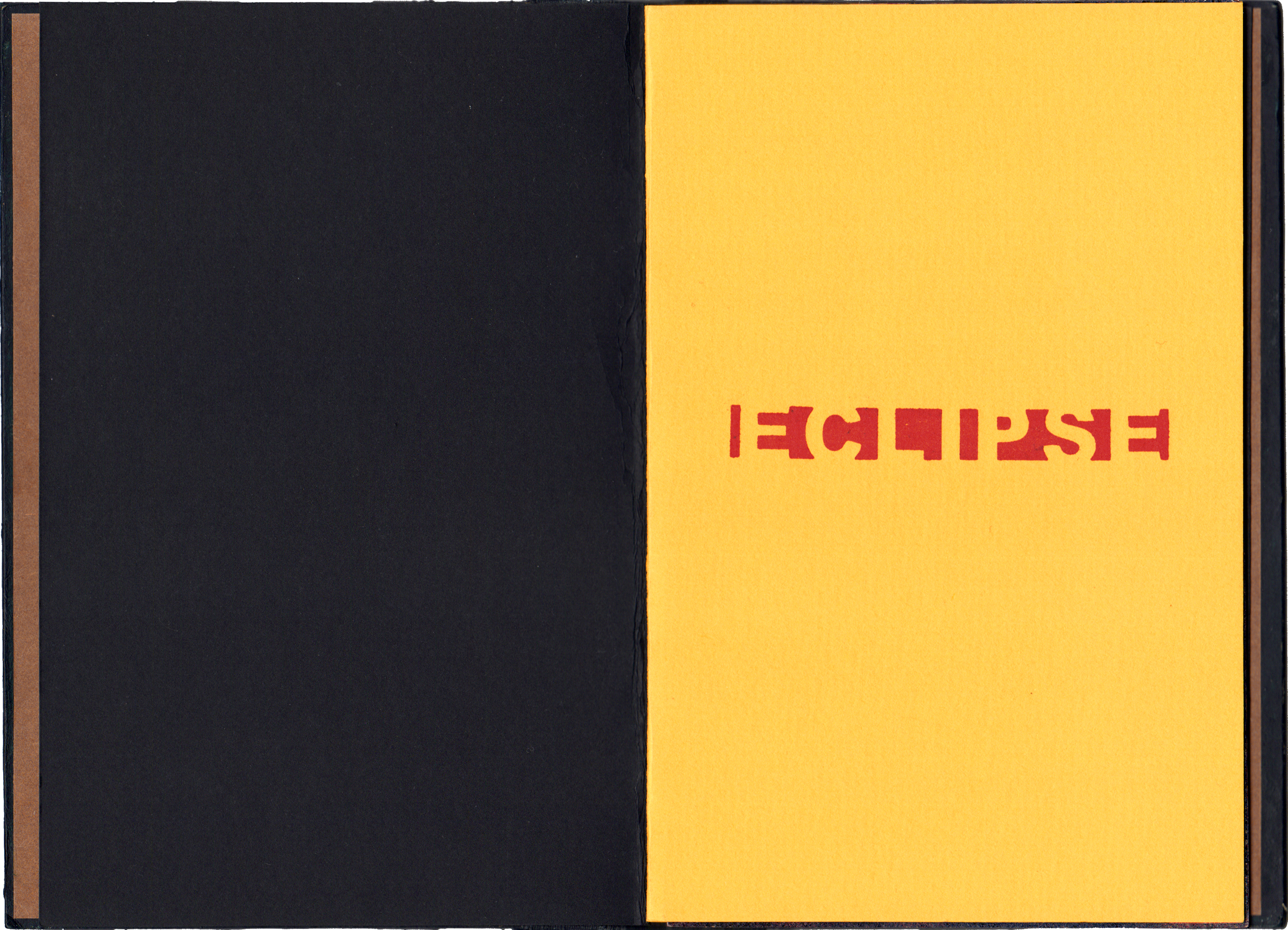
Title page spread / Al. Parygin Eclipse. St. Petersburg. 2015. The Garage Museum of Contemporary Art Collection

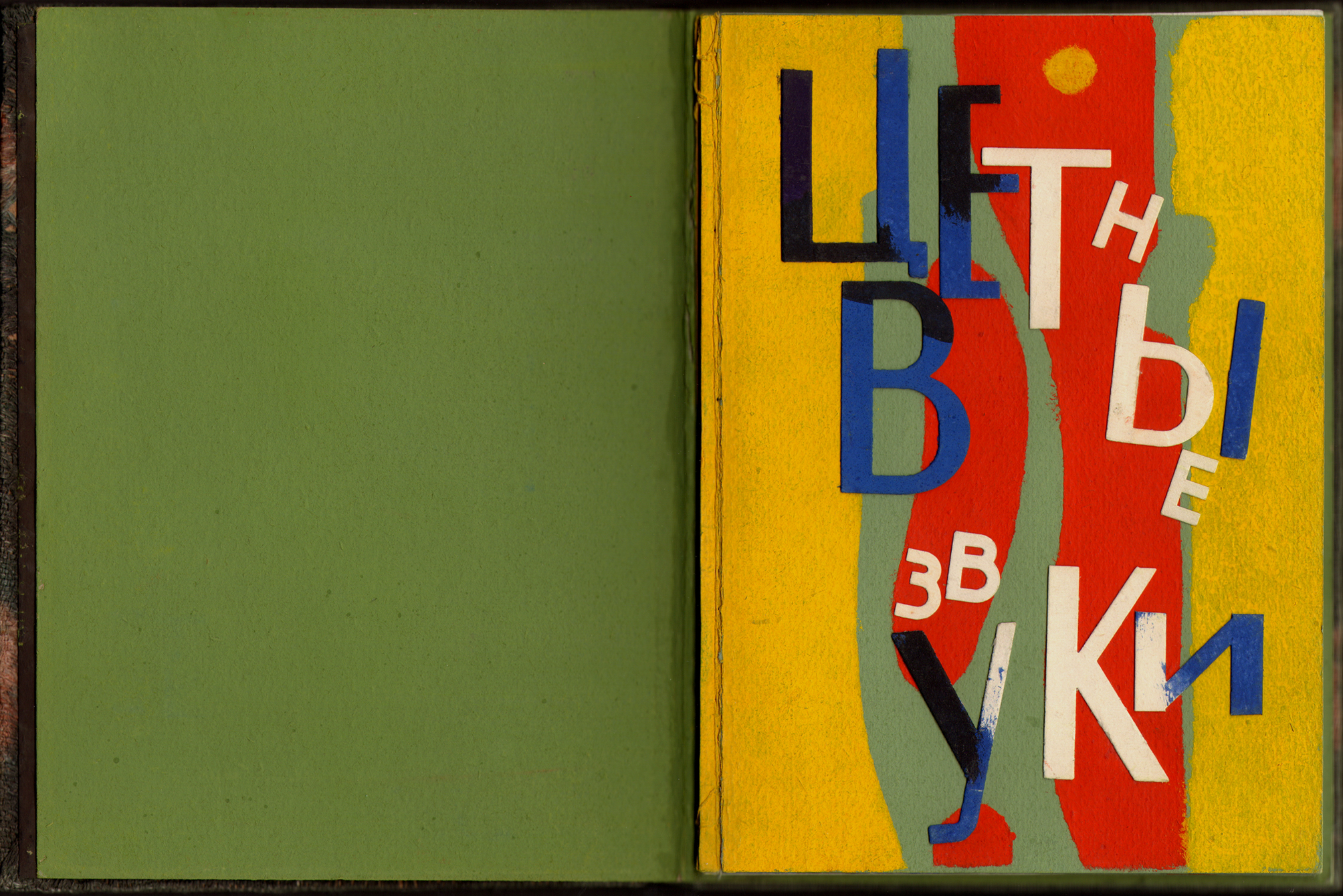
Title page spread / Al. Parygin Tsvetnye zvuki (The Colored Sounds). Leningrad. 1989. The Van Abbemuseum Collection

Since 1989, Parygin has been contributing to artist's books. His first editions featured visual series of the author's poetic text: Pesok (The Sand). Leningrad. 1989; Circulation—5 numbered and signed copies; Tsvetnye zvuki (The Coloured Sounds). Leningrad. 1989. Circulation—5 numbered and signed copies; Zelenaia kniga (The Green Book). Leningrad. 1989. Circulation—6 numbered and signed copies; Moia mansarda (My Attic). Leningrad. 1990. Circulation—6 numbered and signed copies. And the artist’s book Krasnye karliki (The Red Dwarfs). Saint Petersburg. 1990. Circulation—8 numbered and signed copies.

From Elena Grigoryant’s article (2019):

Another important direction in contemporary Russian artists’ books, with many precedents set by the Futurists, is the fusion of poetic and artistic talent of artist-authors blessed with Doppelbegabung. The intimate relationships between text and image is enhanced when author and artist are one and the same person and engage in an inter-art discourse that leads to creations that are truly unified works of art. An artist who achieved equal mastery in more than one medium and made different arts merge in his personality was no doubt Alexey Parygin. His poetic collections <...> represent an attempt to synthesize text and plastic figurative form in books where literary and visual languages are calculated to have a simultaneous effect on the reader/viewer. The work of Alexey Parygin have common features that are not accidental as the books were created at more or less the same time.

Spanning for three decades of featured art works the legacy holds about forty unique book objects. In the past decade the artist has participated several major group art editions: Metamorphosis. LS Collection Van Abbemuseum. 2013; Mayakovsky-Manifesto. St. Petersburg. 2014. Strannik Gumilëv (Wanderer Gumilyov). 2016; Jubilaeus. LS Collection Van Abbemuseum. 2018; Russkiy bukvar' (Russian Alphabet book). M. 2018; Poeziya neizvestnykh slov: Variatsii v kirillitse (Poetry of Unknown Words: Variations in the Cyrillic alphabet). M. 2019.

== Museum collections ==
Parygin in his workshop at the Benois House. Photo by A. Yakubovich. 2016

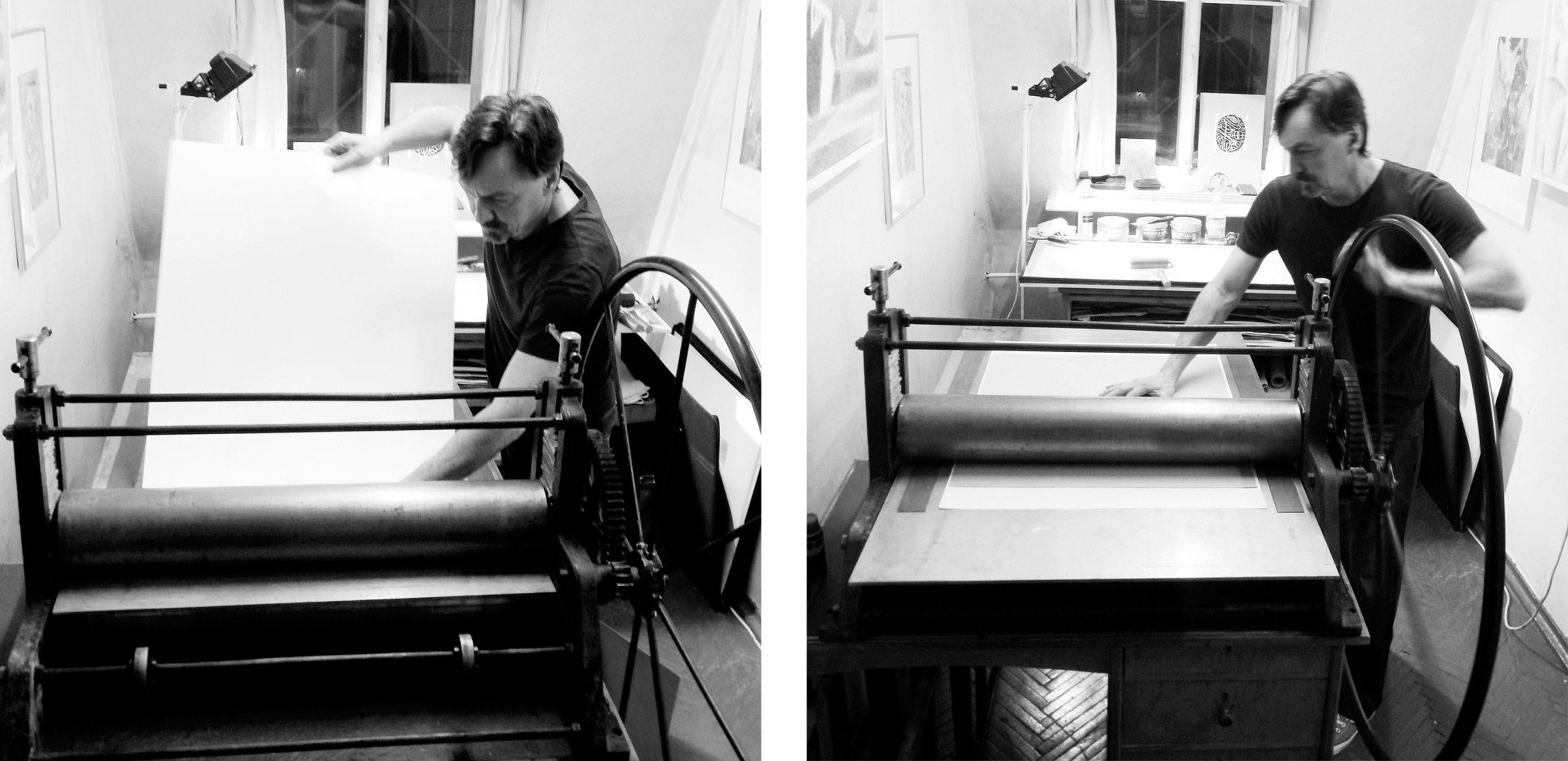
Printmaking / Work in progress. Photo by Andrey Korolchuk. 2019

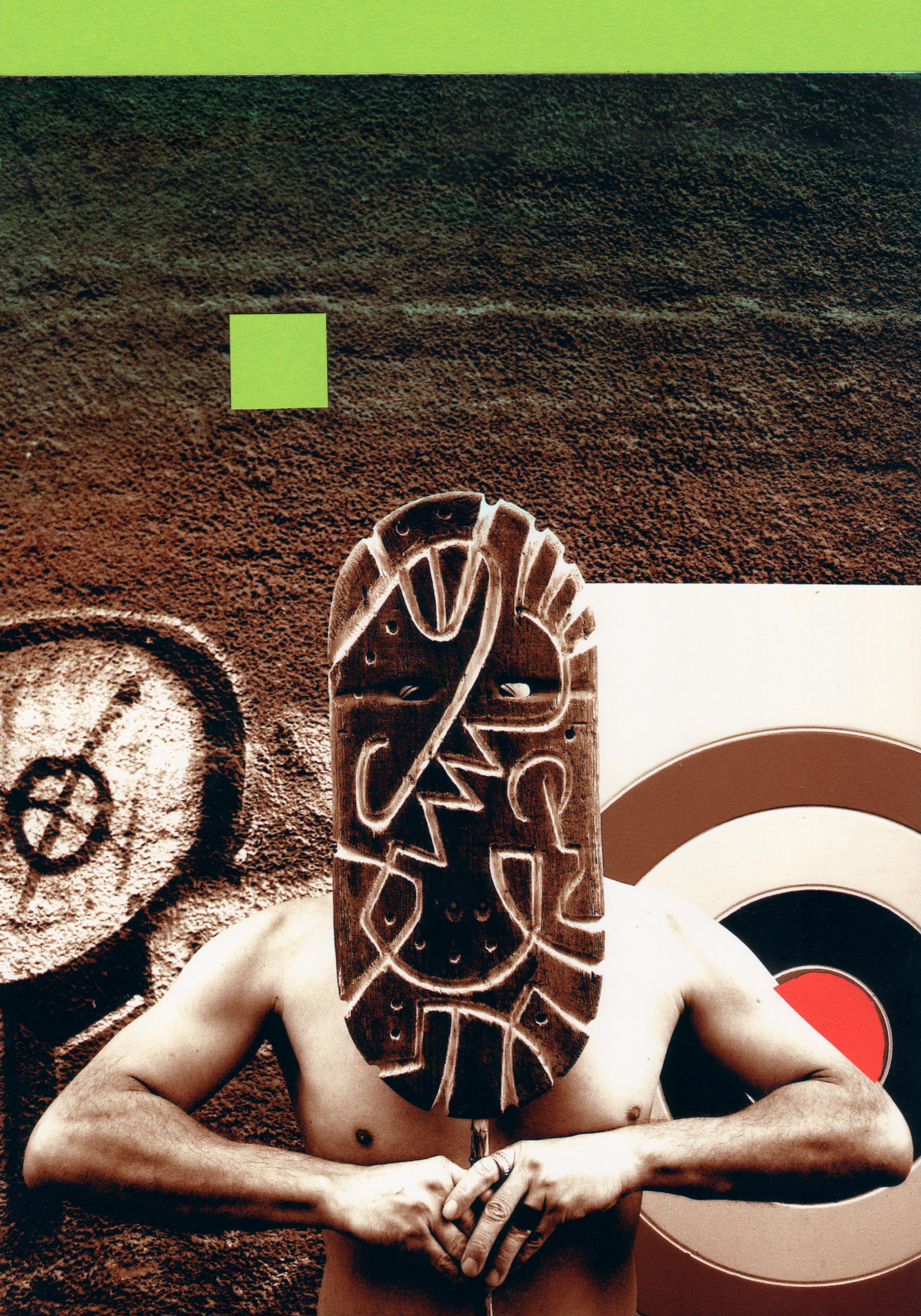
PostUrbanism Human V. 2014, 100 × 70 cm, paper, mixed media

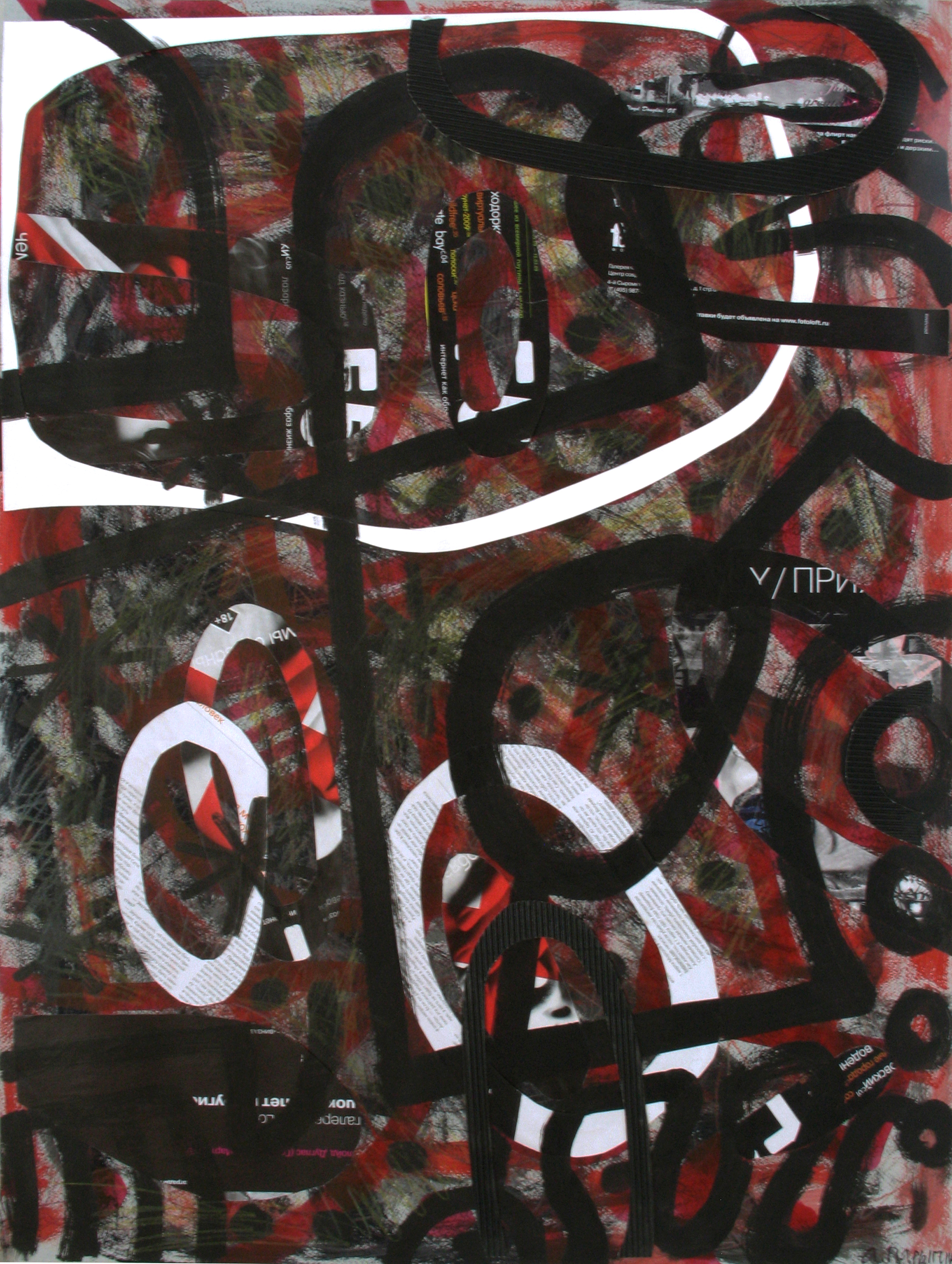
Lines and Planes VIII, 2010, 80 × 60 cm, paper, mixed media

- British Library. (London).
- J. Paul Getty Museum. Getty Research Institute. (Los Angeles).
- Princeton University Library. Rare Books and Special Collections Dept. (New Jersey).
- Van Abbemuseum. Russian book art collection LS (Albert Lemmens & Serge Stommels). (Eindhoven).
- Saxon State and University Library Dresden. (Dresden).
- Hamburg State and University Library Carl von Ossietzky. (Hamburg).
- National Museum, Warsaw. Cabinet of modern graphics and drawings. (Warsaw).
- A. Kasteyev State Museum of Arts. Graphics collection. (Almaty).
- Library of Catalonia. Prints and Drawings Collection. (Barcelona).
- National Library of Latvia. Prints and Drawings Collection. (Riga).
- Latvian National Museum of Art. Arsenal/ Artist's Book Foundation. Science library. (Riga).
- Deering Library. Northwestern University. Artist Book Foundation. (Evanston, Illinois).
- Chapin Library. Artist's Book Foundation. (Williamstown, Massachusetts).
- Kumu. Science Library. Tallinn.
- Luciano Benetton Collection Imago Mundi. Gallerie delle Prigioni. (Treviso).
- Alfredo Guati Rojo National Watercolor Museum. Mexico City.
- Museo de la Acuarela. (Toluca).
- Archivio di Comunicazione Visiva e Libri d’Artista. (Sicily).
- Mezinárodní portrétní galerie. (Tuzla).
- Остен музеј на цртеж. Skopje.
- Hermitage Museum. Hermitage Academic Library/ Rare Books and Manuscripts Sector. (St. Petersburg).
- Pushkin Museum. Science Library/ Rare Books Dept. (Moscow).
- Russian Museum. Department of engraving XVIII-XXI centuries. The contemporary photography sector; GRM Science Library/ Rare Books Sector (St. Petersburg).
- National Library of Russia. Department of Prints (St. Petersburg).
- Russian State Library. Department of Prints/ Artist's Book Foundation (Moscow).
- Library of the Russian Academy of Sciences. Rare Book Sector (St. Petersburg).
- Research Library of the Russian Academy of Arts. Rare Book Sector (St. Petersburg).
- Museum of Art of St. Petersburg of the 20th and 21st centuries. Saint Petersburg Manege. (St. Petersburg).
- Garage Museum of Contemporary Art. Library/ Artist's Books Sector. (Moscow).
- State Museum of the History of St. Petersburg. (St. Petersburg).
- Anna Akhmatova Literary and Memorial Museum. (St. Petersburg).
- Russian State Archive of Literature and Art. (St. Petersburg).
- The Museum Complex The Universe of Water. (St. Petersburg).
- Kuryokhin Center. (St. Petersburg).
- Peterhof State Museum-Reserve/ Benoit Family Museum. Russia.
- The Mayakovsky State Museum. (Moscow).
- The State Museum and Exhibition Center "ROSISO. Graphics collection. (Moscow).
- Russian State Library of Arts. (Moscow).
- State Darwin Museum. Graphics. (Moscow).
- State Fine Arts Museum of the Republic of Tatarstan. Graphics collection. (Kazan).
- Yekaterinburg Museum of Fine Arts. (Yekaterinburg).
- Volgograd Museum of Fine Arts named after I. Mashkov. (Volgograd).
- P. M. Dogadin Astrakhan State Art Gallery. (Astrakhan).
- Bashkir Nesterov Art Museum. Graphics collection. (Ufa).
- Tsiolkovsky State Museum of the History of Cosmonautics. (Kaluga).
- Dagestan Museum of Fine Arts named after P. S. Gamzatova. (Makhachkala).
- Murmansk Regional Art Museum. Graphics collection. (Murmansk).
- Contemporary Fine Art Museum on Dimitrovsky Street. (Rostov on Don).
- Omsk Vrubel Museum of Fine Arts. Graphics collection. (Omsk).
- Liberov Center State Regional Art Museum. (Omsk).
- Lipetsk Museum of Decorative and Applied Arts. (Lipetsk).
- Krasnodar Kovalenko Art Museum. Graphics collection. (Krasnodar).
- Elabuz State Museum Reserve. Contemporary Graphics Foundation. (Elabuga).

== Exhibitions ==
Since 1986, the artist participated in more than 250 exhibitions held in Russia (St. Petersburg, Moscow, Rostov-on-Donn, Kazan, Nizhny Novgorod, Kaluga, Arkhangelsk, Saratov, etc.). The artist exhibited in the Netherlands in Groningen, Eindhoven; Germany in Kiel, Hamburg, Aachen; Italy in Naples, Rome, Caltanissetta; Spain in Bilbao; Montenegro in Bar; Latvia in Riga; Poland in Warsaw; China in Beijing; Mexico in Mexico City; India; Brazil in Bagé; Guatemala in San Pedro Carchá; Ethiopia in Addis Ababa and others.

=== Group projects ===
The artist participated in international art projects, festivals and open-air exhibits: “Kubachi Tower” (Kubachi, Amuzgi, Makhachkala / Dagestan, 2022); “Artisterium XII” (Kutaisi, Tbilisi/ Georgia, 2019); “Museum for Friends” (Lipetsk/ Russia, 2019); "Clouds" (Art-village Witland. Vistula Spit, 2018); “Printed Graphics” (Kazan, Sviyazhsk/ Tatarstan, 2016); “Crna Gora u o'ima ruskih slikara” (Bar/ Montenegro, 2012); “Warszawa w budowie — architektura XXI w malarstwie (Warsaw/ Poland, September 16–26, 2011) and others.

Principal Artist, Printmaking Studio, Timofey Markov Publishing House, St. Petersburg (2012-2014). The artist worked on several joint publishing projects with Georgy Kovenchuk.

=== Solo exhibitions ===
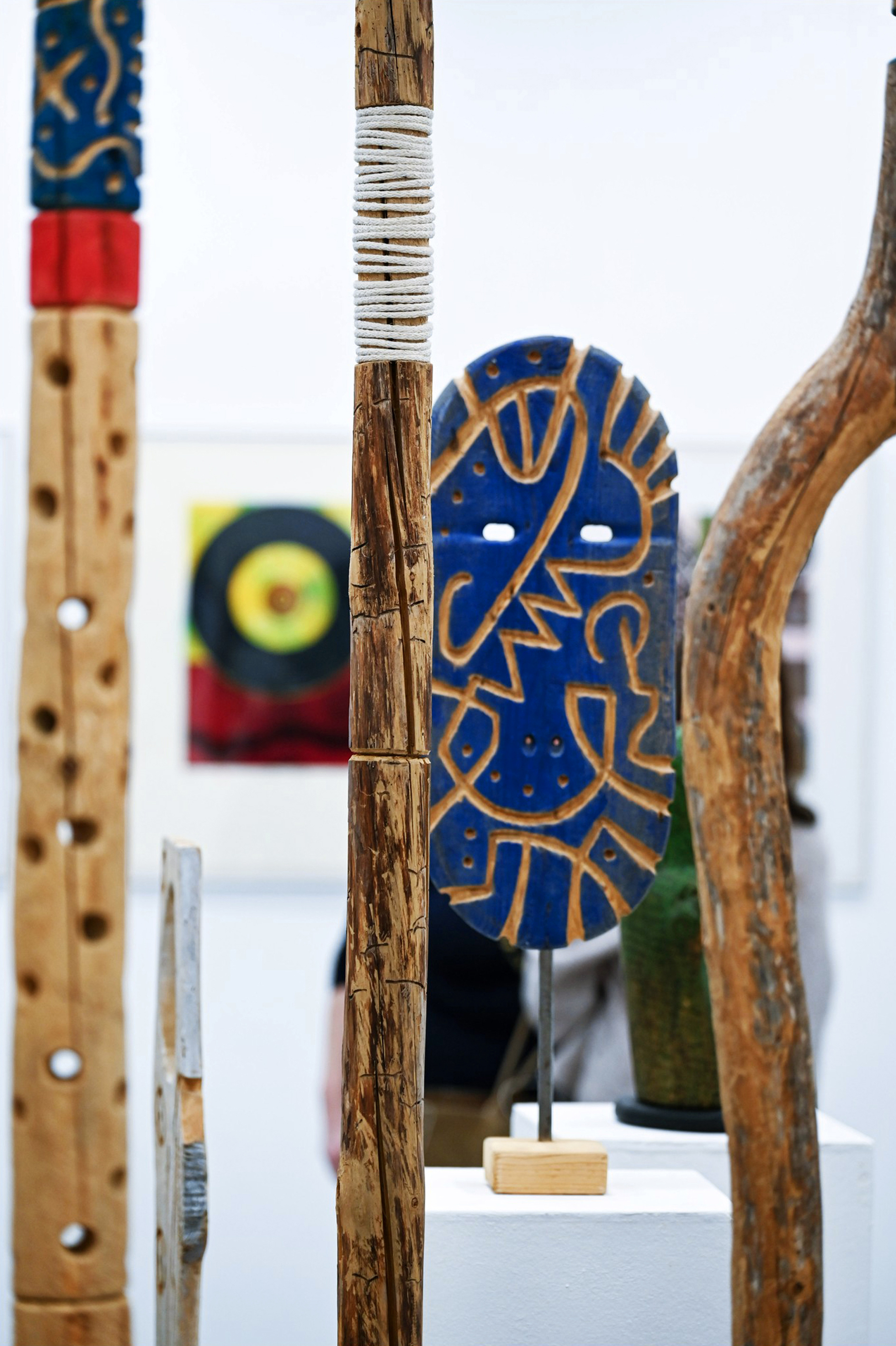
Posturbanism Back to the Future. Solo exhibition. SPb. 2023

- Alexey Parygin/ PostUrbanism-Northwest.—Alvar Aalto Library. Vyborg. July 1—31, 2025.
- PostUrbanJazz.—JFC Jazz Club. Saint Petersburg. December 22, 2023—February 22, 2024.
- Posturbanism: Back to the Future. Alexey Parygin. Engravings, art objects, collection.—Book Graphics Library. Saint Petersburg. March 16—April 16, 2023.
- Aqua-Silk.—House of Scientists. Saint Petersburg. October 4—22, 1998.
- Parygin & Korolchuk (painting, graphics).—Russian Museum, Lecture Hall. Saint Petersburg. November 30—December 31, 1991.

=== Group exhibitions ===
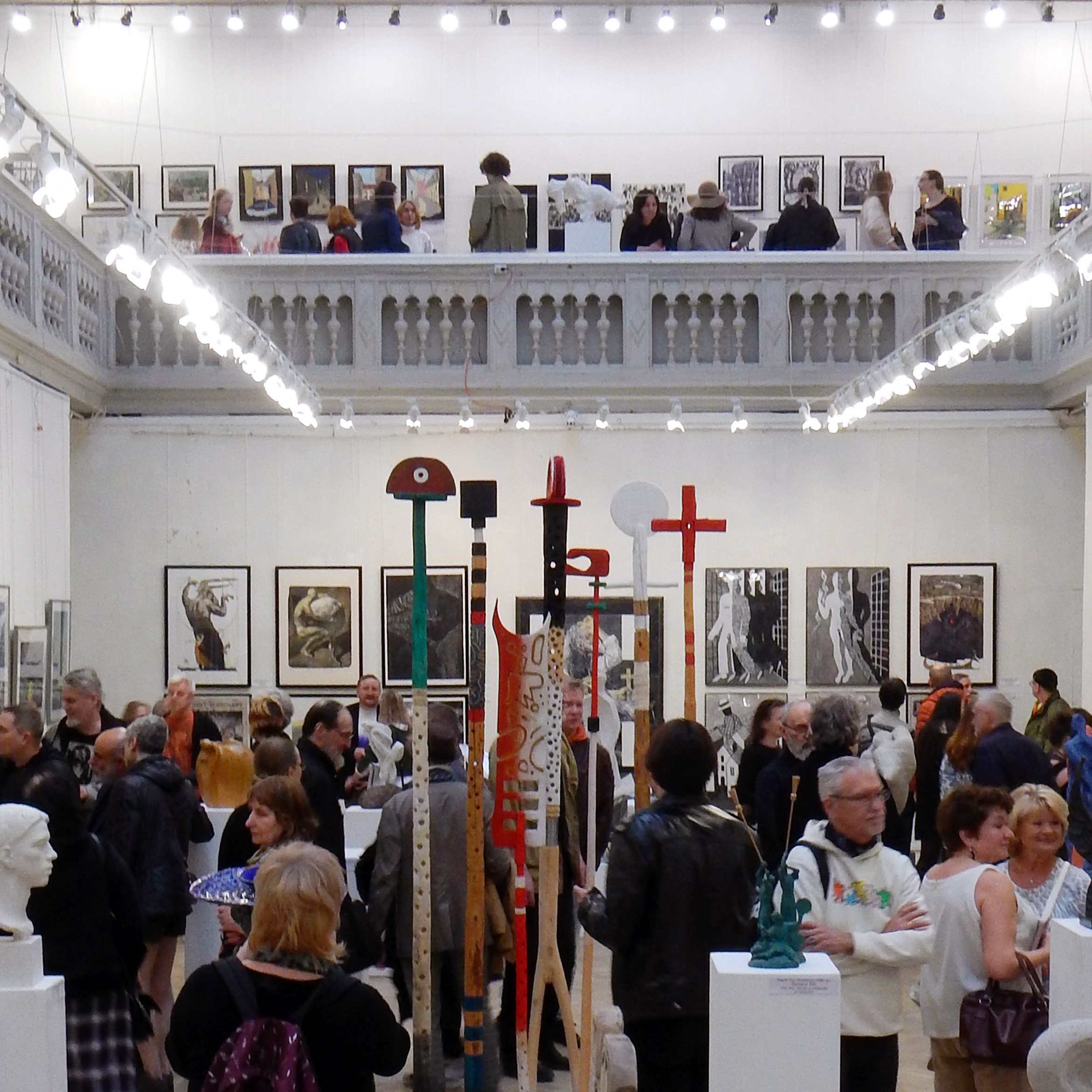
Opening of a group exhibition. SPbUA. 2026

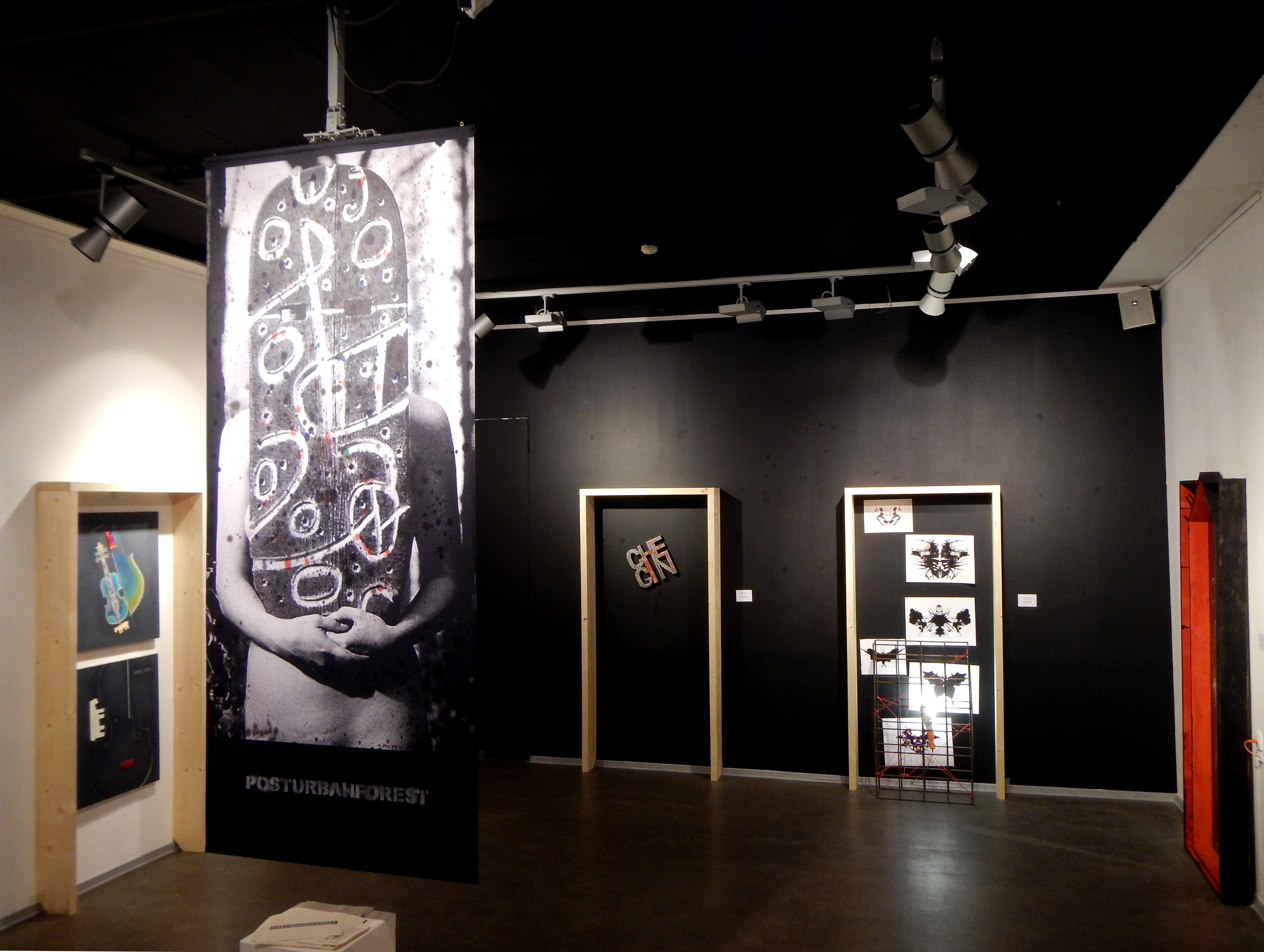
Fragment of the exhibition. SPb. 2022

- 2 IBMB International Biennial Of Miniature Art-Graphics And Drawings. Officers' Hall. Bitola. North Macedonia. August 12—31, 2025.
- Non Stop Jazz / Valery Mishin, Alexey Parygin, Yuri Shtapakov (graphics, art objects). Borey Art Center. Saint Petersburg. May 3—24, 2025.
- BureauGraphics. Saint Petersburg Union of Artists. Saint Petersburg. March 11—23, 2025.
- Chinese-Russian exhibition / The 3rd Jinan International Biennale 'The Age of Human Wisdom'. Shandong Art Museum. Jinan. China. December 20–26, 2024.
- Kazan International Printmaking Triennale „Rider“ 2024. The State Museum of Fine Arts of the Republic of Tatarstan. Kazan. October 3, 2024–January 19, 2025.
- Da(r)shak: A Decade of IPEP. Government Museum and Art Gallery, Chandigarh. Chandigarh. February 12–April 30, 2024.
- Contemporary Artist's Book. National Library of Russia. Department of Prints and Photographs. Saint Petersburg. December 4, 2023–February 28, 2024.
- Da(r)shak: A Decade of Printmaking & Viewership. Bihar Museum. Patna. 2023.
- Nuovi corpi nuove forme, Libri d’Artisti. Libri Oggetto (Dalla collezione Archivio di Comunicazione Visiva e Libri d’Artista). Galleria Civica d'Arte di Palazzo Moncada. Caltanissetta. 2022.
- 5ª Bienal Internacional de Gravura „Lívio Abramo“. Casa da Cultura Luiz Antonio Marinez Corrêa. Araraquara. 2018—2019.
- OSTEN Biennial of Drawing. National Gallery of Macedonia—Chifte Hammam. Skopje. North Macedonia. 2018.
- E’CARTA Mini carte contemporanee. MAiO Museo dell’Arte in Ostaggio e delle grafiche visionarie. Cassina de' Pecchi. 2018.
- Il PIACERE NEI LIBRI rassegna di arte erotica dagli ex libris ai libri d’artista. Castel Nuovo. Naples. 2018.
- Sculture da Viaggio — omaggio a Bruno Munari. Museo regionale interdisciplinare di Caltanissetta. Caltanissetta. 2017.
- Die Verwandlung. 25 Jahre russische Künstlerbücher. Staats- und Universitätsbibliothek Hamburg. Hamburg. 2013—2014.
- Latvijas Nacionālās bibliotēkas grafikas jaunieguvumi (gravīras, grāmatu plates, zīmējumi): 2010—2011. National Library of Latvia. Riga. 2012.
- V Bienal Internacional de la Acurela. Alfredo Guati Rojo National Watercolor Museum. Mexico City. 2002, November—2003, February.
- Равноденствие. Gallery Nevsky 20. Leningrad. 1991, June 22—July 22.
- Молодежная выставка. Exhibition Hall of the Artists Union of Russia on Okhta. Leningrad. 1990, June.
- Без жури. Exhibition Hall of the Artists Union of Russia on Okhta. Leningrad. 1989, April.
- Ленинград, история, люди (молодежная республиканская выставка). Exhibition Hall of the Artists Union of Russia on Okhta. Leningrad. 1988, June 10—July 10.

== Teaching ==
Teaching work since 1988.

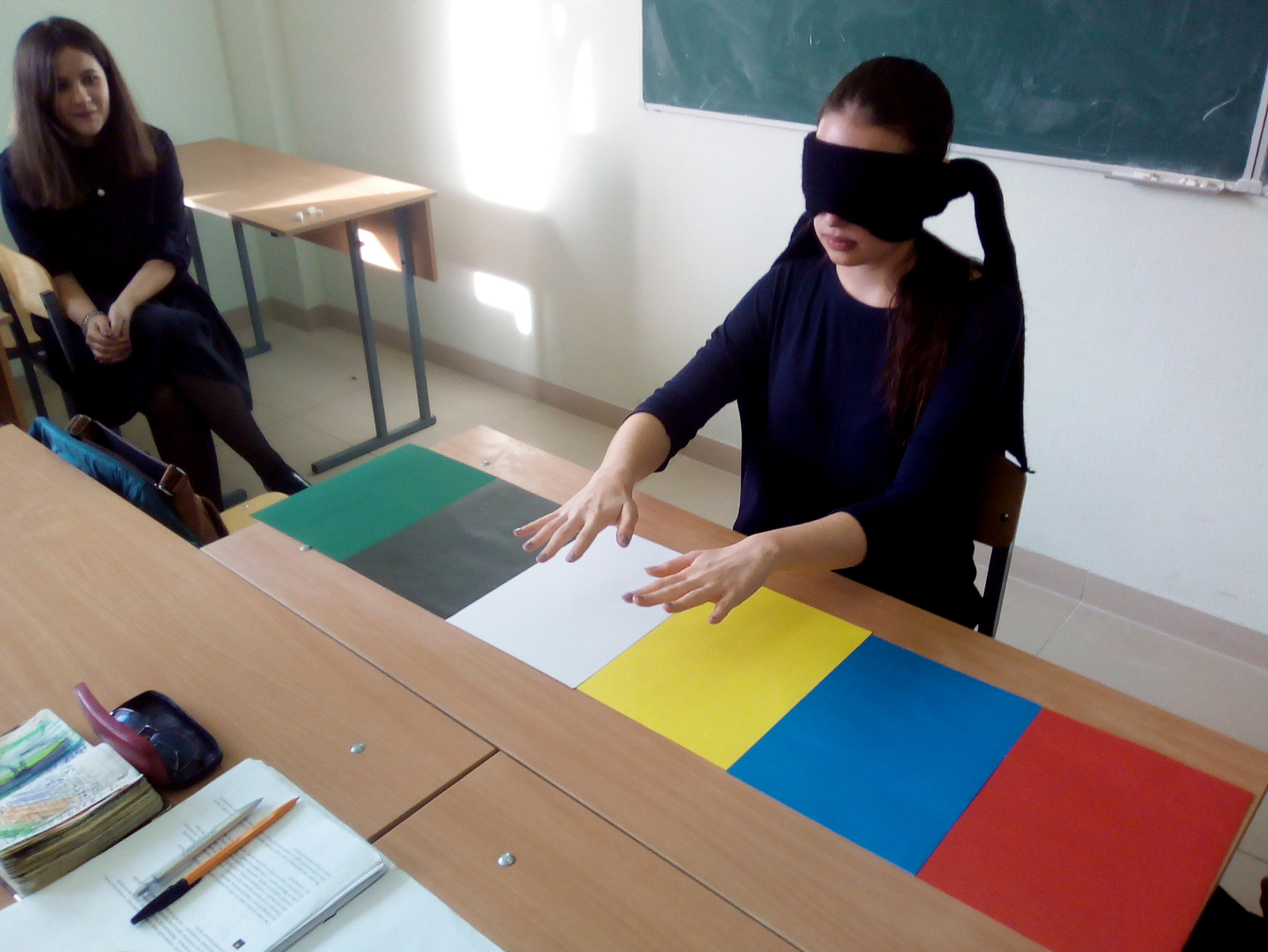
A fragment of photo documentation of an experiment on extrasensory perception of color. On the wave nature of light/color perception. 2018. SPb (SUITD).

Taught courses: Drawing and Photography Courses at the Department of Graphics and Sculptures Herzen University (2023 to present; 2020–2021). Color science, printed graphics, research at the Department of Graphic Design at St. Petersburg State University of Industrial Technologies and Design (2018–2019). He taught layout, the basics of composition, and the foundations of sculpture at the Institute of Landscape Architecture Saint-Petersburg State Forestry University (2017–2019). Painting course and drawing course at the Department of Interior Design/ St. Petersburg State University of Industrial Technologies and Design (2003–2012), for which the concept of learning and working programs of the 1st in the 4th course was developed; painting course at the Design School, St. Petersburg, (2004–2009). Author's course Basics of examination of graphic works of art at the Department of Art Studies of St. Petersburg Humanitarian University of Trade Unions, the management of diploma works (1995–2001).

== Bibliography ==
=== Texts by A. Parygin ===
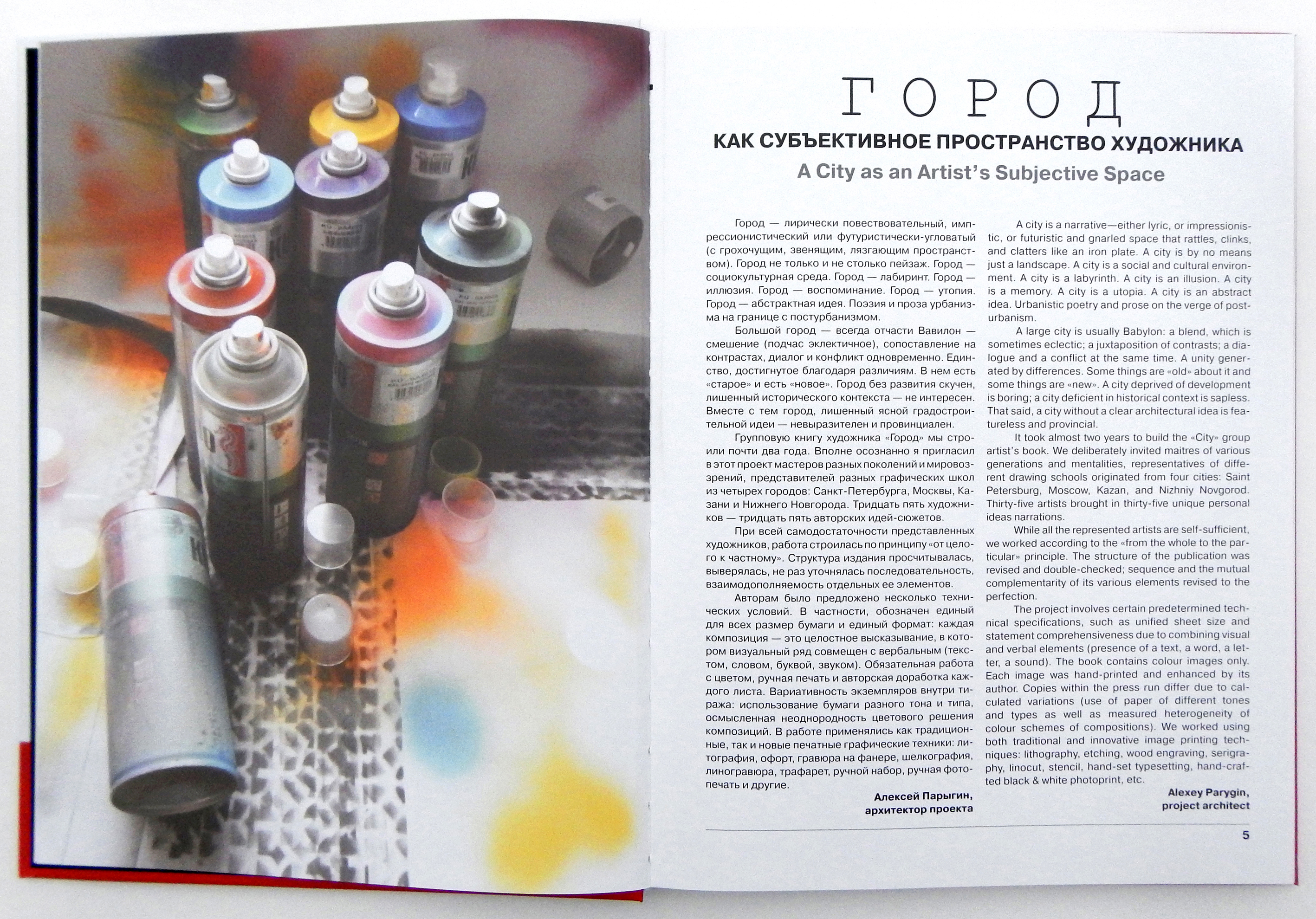
A City as an Artist’s Subjective Space. (Rus & En) 2020

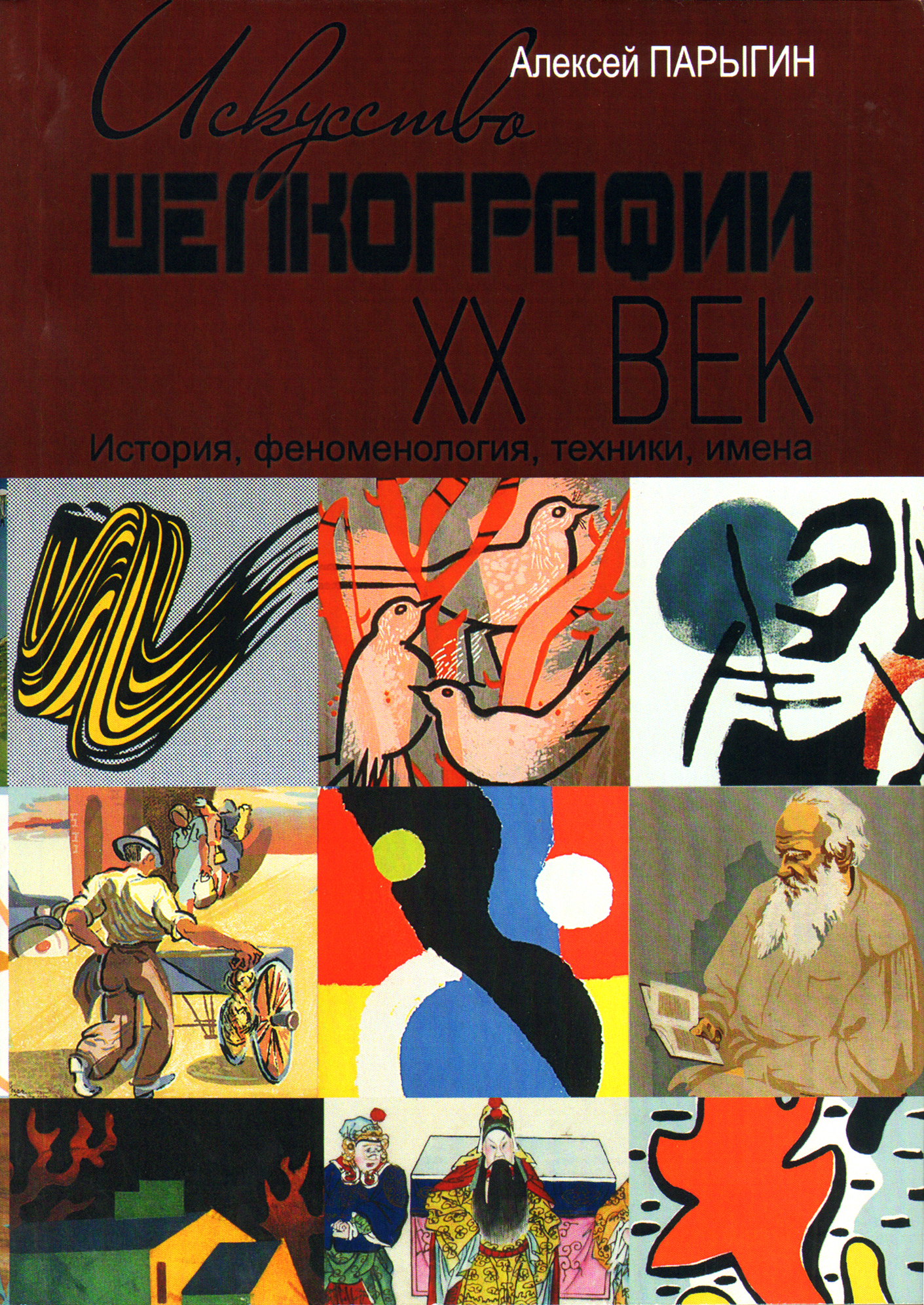
The Art of Silk Screening. The 20th century. / Cover. 2010

Among the priority scientific interests of A. B. Parygin is the history of the techniques of the author's printed graphics, first of all—silk screening. Issues of the primacy of using silkscreen as an art technique; Regional schools and an early history of the process; The chronology and geography of its spread in the world; the interconnection of the latest currents and technological innovations in art. Silkscreen in the art of the United States and Canada and Cuba (1920-60s), in European art: Germany, England, France, Finland (1930-60s) and the USSR. Parygin is the author of Russia's first fundamental art research on the history and phenomenology of creative silk screening. The results are published in two monographs (2009, 2010).

Parygin is the author of Russia's first fundamental art research on the history and phenomenology of creative silk screening . The results are published in two monographs (2009, 2010). The author of more than 100 articles on the history of graphics and contemporary art, including the artists of St. Petersburg (N.F. Lapshin, O.A. Lyagachev, Yu.K. Lyukshin, A. I. Kuindzhi, V.M. Konashevich, A.A. Korolchuk, M.A. Kopylkove, N.I. Kofanove, B.N. Koshelokhov, G.V. Kovenchuk, A.V. Kaplun, L.K. Kazbekove, T.S. Kerner and others) for the German academic directory Allgemeines Künstlerlexikon Die Bildenden Künstler aller Zeiten und Völker (AKL).

=== Monographs ===
- Parygin A.B. The Art of Silk Screening. The 20th century. History, Phenomenology, Techniques, Names.—St. Petersburg: ST. Petersburg GUTD, 2010.—304 pp. (in Russian) ISBN 978-5-7937-0490-8
- Parygin A.B. Silk Screening As Art. Techniques, History, Phenomenology, Artists.—St. Petersburg: ST. Petersburg GUTD, 2009.—261 pp. (in Russian) ISBN 978-5-7937-0397-0

=== Publications by A. Parygin ===
- Parygin Alexey A City as an Artist's Subjectivity / Artist’s Book Yearbook 2022-2023. Edited by Sarah Bodman.—Bristol: CFPR (Centre for Fine Print Research). University of the West of England, 2022. 292 pp. ISBN 978-1-906501-22-8
- Parygin A. B. Постурбанизм как гипотеза.—St. Petersburg art notebooks, # 68, St. Petersburg: AIS, 2022. P. 255-259. ISBN 978-5-906442-32-1 (in Russian)
- Parygin A. B. Созерцание денег (авторский комментарий к проекту).—St. Petersburg art notebooks, # 68, St. Petersburg: AIS, 2022. P. 260-265. ISBN 978-5-906442-32-1 (in Russian)
- Parygin A. B. Искусство — это бизнес (авторский комментарий к проекту).—St. Petersburg art notebooks, # 68, St. Petersburg: AIS, 2022. P. 248-254. ISBN 978-5-906442-32-1 (in Russian)
- Parygin Alexey "A City as the Artist's Subjectivity" is an Artist is a large Russian project in the livre d'artiste format // Book Arts Newsletter. No. 140. Bristol: CFPR (Centre for Fine Print Research). University of the West of England, 2021, July—August. P. 46-48. ISSN 1754-9086
- Parygin A. B. A City as an Artist’s Subjective Space / City as Artist's subjectivity. Artist's book project. Catalog. Authors of the articles: Parygin A.B., Markov T.A., Klimova E.D., Borovsky A.D., Severyukhin D.Ya., Grigoryants E.I., Blagodatov N.I. (in Russian and English)—SPb: Ed. T. Markova. 2020. 128 pp. P. 5. ISBN 978-5-906281-32-6
- Parygin A.B. Printed graphics between "yesterday" and "tomorrow" / Vs. Art. catalogue of "Printed Graphics of St. Petersburg Artists." St. Petersburg: SPb SH. 2020. 192 pp. P. 3–8. ISBN 978-5-6043891-1-9 (in Russian)
- Parygin A. B. Posturbanism as a concept of the future // St. Petersburg art notebooks, # 53, St. Petersburg: AIS, 2019. P. 236–238. ISBN 978-5-906442-17-8 (in Russian)
- Paryguine А. Idée et Manifeste [Posturbanisme] // Revue Trakt. Nu. 6; Juin 2018.—Paris. pp. 26–28. ISSN 2558-3522 (in French)
- Parygin A. B. Artist's Book as an art form / "The Art of Printed Graphics: History and Modernity." In Sat. Articles on the materials of the scientific conference Fourth Kazan Art Studies Readings November 19–20, 2015. Kazan: GMAI RT, 2015. P. 75–78, il. ISBN 978-5-4428-0085-2 (in Russian)
- Parygin A. B. Ljukšin, Jurij, Ljagačev, Oleg // Allgemeines Künstlerlexikon Die Bildenden Künstler aller Zeiten und Völker.—Walter de Gruyter. Band 85, 2015. 540 pp. ISBN 978-3-11-023190-8 (in German)
- Parygin A. B. Lapšin, Nikolaj; Kuindži, Archip // Allgemeines Künstlerlexikon Die Bildenden Künstler aller Zeiten und Völker.—Walter de Gruyter. Band 82 — 2014, 539 pp. ISBN 978-3-11-023187-8 (in German)
- Parygin A. B. Konasevic, Vladimir; Korolcuk, Andrej; Kopylkov, Mikhail; Kofanov, Nikolaj // Allgemeines Künstlerlexikon Die Bildenden Künstler aller Zeiten und Völker.—Walter de Gruyter. Volume 81, 2013. 540 pp. ISBN 978-3-11-023186-1 (in German)
- Parygin A. The Bedbug—2013. P. 140-165 / In the book: Georgy Kovenchuk (Gaga) draws "The Bedbug" (book-album) // Kovenchuk G., Borovsky A.—SPb: T. Markov Publishing House.—2013, 160 pp. ISBN 978-5-906281-08-1 (in Russian)
- Parygin A. B. Koselochov, Boris; Kovencuk, Georgij; Kovalskij, Sergei // Allgemeines Künstlerlexikon Die Bildenden Künstler aller Zeiten und Völker.—Walter de Gruyter. Volume 80, 2013. 540 p. ISBN 978-3-11-023185-4 (in German)
- Parygin A. B. The birth of Russian silk screening / Ural art and museum business: experience, problems, perspectives. Sat. Mat. Conf. All-Russian art readings of B. V. Pavlovsky's memory. EMIYA, 2011. Yekaterinburg. 2013. pp. 194–198 (in Russian)
- Parygin A. B. Moscow silkscreen 1950-2010 // Design. Materials. Technology. No 3 (28), St. Petersburg: SPb GUTD, 2013. P. 77–82, Il. 1. ISSN 1990-8997 (in Russian)
- Parygin A. B. Kabacek, Leonid; Kacnelson, Grigory; Kaplun, Adrian; Kazbekov, Latif; Kerner, Tatjana // Allgemeines Künstlerlexikon Die Bildenden Künstler aller Zeiten und Völker.—Walter de Gruyter. Volume 79, 2013. 535 pp. ISBN 978-3-11-023184-7 (in German)
- Parygin A. B. Canadian Silk-Screen Project. (1942-1963) // St. Petersburg Art Notebooks, # 26, St. Petersburg: AIS, 2013. P. 228–230. ISBN 978-5-906442-01-7 (in Russian)
- Parygin A. B. Silk Screening in the Art of Post-War Germany // Design. Materials. Technology. No 2 (22), St. Petersburg: SPb GUTD, 2012. P. 66-72, Il. ISSN 1990-8997 (in Russian)
- Parygin A. B. The Picturesque Avant-garde of the XX century as a School // St. Petersburg: SPb GUTD, 2012. Series 3. No 1, St. Petersburg: SPb GUTD, 2012. pp. 88–92, Il. ISSN 2079-8210 (in Russian)
- Parygin A. B. The First Steps of Creative Silk Screening in Russia // Design. Materials. Technology. No 2 (17), St. Petersburg: SPb GUTD, 2011. P. 74-78, il. ISSN 1990-8997 (in Russian)
- Parygin A. B. Course of painting and drawing at the Interior Department // St. Petersburg Art Notebooks, # 21, St. Petersburg: AIS, 2011. P. 181-190. ISBN 978-5-9902810-2-8 (in Russian)
- Parygin A. B. The First Steps of Creative Silk Screening (serigraphy) in Europe // Design. Materials. Technology. No 3 (14), St. Petersburg: SPb GUTD, 2010. P. 114-116, Il. ISSN 1990-8997 (in Russian)

=== Public lectures ===
- ‘Subjective City as a Project (Printmaking and Artist’s Books)‘. The State Museum of Fine Arts of the Republic of Tatarstan. Kazan. 2024, October 4. 1-2.30 p.m
- ‘Subjective City as a Project‘. Vologda. 2024, July 13. 2-3.30 p.m
- ‘Manifesto as a Book‘. Book Graphics Library. Saint Petersburg. 2024, May 18. 9.45-10.45 p.m
- ‘Fundamentals of Printmaking Examination and a Short Course in the History of Engraving from its Appearance to the Present Day‘. Express course for artists of Goznak. Peter and Paul Fortress. Saint Petersburg. 2024, April 3, 4, 5. 1-3 p.m
- ‘The Artist About the Artist’s Books. From Z to A‘. National Library of Russia. Department of Prints and Photographs. Saint Petersburg. 2024, February 13. 6-7 p.m.
- ‘Posturbanism: yesterday, today, tomorrow‘. Library of book graphics. Saint Petersburg. 2023, April 1. 5-6.30 p.m. (As part of a personal exhibition).
- Five lectures: ‘The Artist's Book in the Department of Prints NLR Russian‘. National Library of Russia. Department of Prints and Photographs. Saint Petersburg. 2023, February 2, February 9, February 16, March 2, March 7. 7-8.40 p.m.
- Five lectures: ‘Pleasure accessible to many. History of Prints‘ for the lecture hall of the Russian Museum. Mikhailovsky Castle. Saint Petersburg. 2022, September 29, October 13, November 10, December 15, December 29. 7-9 p.m.
- ‘The Artist's Book: Torment and Ecstasy‘ for Lobachevsky Lab. N. I. Lobachevsky State University of Nizhny Novgorod. Nizhny Novgorod. 2022, September 22. 6-8 p.m.
- ‘Post Urbanism as the Concept of the Future‘. David Kakabadze Kutaisi Fine Art Gallery. Kutaisi. 2019, June 15, Saturday. 3-4 p.m. (As part of the art festival “Artisterium XII”).

=== Interview ===
- Алексей Парыгин. Постурбанизм: знаки в пространстве идей.—Interview with Elena Grigoryants // Авансцена. 2023 (11), December, No. 3, 4. P. 148-155. (in Russian) Circulation–2000 copies. ISSN 2712-7982 ISBN 978-5-907685-39-0
- Возвращение к истокам. Lana Konokotina. NTV—St. Petersburg. "Today in St. Petersburg". March 16, 2023 19:30. (in Russian)
- „Россия докатилась до новой этики“: художник Парыгин назвал жалобы на „обнажёнку“ в Эрмитаже декларацией варварства. Interview with artist Alexey Parygin. Rosbalt. 2021, April 8. 19:05. (in Russian)
- Российские художники рассказали истории о любви и ненависти к городам. Lana Konokotina. NTV—St. Petersburg. "Today in St. Petersburg". October 23, 2020. 19:30. (in Russian)

=== Critique ===
- Alexeeva A. Aleksej Parygin. Parola. Colore. Emozione / Il libro d'artista. Problemi e tendenze nell'arte dei maestri pietroburghesi // Trame di letteratura comparata.—Nuova Editrice Universitaria. Nuova sene anno VIII, numero 8, gennaio-dicembre 2024. 269 p. Р. 162—163. (in Italian) ISSN 1720-5417 ISBN 978-88-95155-89-0
- Danilyants T. Communicative strategies of the "artist's book" (Based on the work of Alexey Parygin) // Сборник материалов тринадцатой научно-практической конференции «Трауготовские чтения 2022» / ed. A. K. Kononov.—St. Petersburg: BKG, 2024. 424 pp. 334-343. (in Russian) ISBN 978-5-907889-07-1
- Pavlovsky A. S. Designing yourself: About the first books of Alexei Parygin // Сборник материалов двенадцатой научно-практической конференции «Трауготовские чтения 2022» / ed. A. K. Kononova.—St. Petersburg: BKG, 2023. 360 pp. pp. 153–160. (in Russian) ISBN 978-5-6049512-9-3
- Klimova Ek. A City as a Book / Artist’s Book Yearbook 2022-2023. Edited by Sarah Bodman.—Bristol: CFPR (Centre for Fine Print Research). University of the West of England. 2022. 292 pp. (in English) ISBN 978-1-906501-22-8
- Wilkins, Caroline A vocal journey through the language of zaum // Journal of Interdisciplinary Voice Studies. Volume 4, Number 1, 1 April 2019, pp. 85–99 (15)
- Grigoryants El. Absorbing the Futurist heritage: Vasily Vlasov and Alexey Parygin / The Futurist Tradition in Contemporary Russian Artists’ Books // International Yearbook of Futurism Studies / Special Issue on Russian Futurism. Ed. by Günter Berghaus.—Berlin & Boston: Walter de Gruyter. Vol. 9. 2019, 520 p. pp. 269–296. (in English) ISBN 978-3-11-064623-8
- Blagodatov N. Art is a search, search is an art.—Neva, No. 2, 2002. P. 253—255. (in Russian)
- Grigoryants E. I. Images by Alexei Parygin // St. Petersburg Panorama, 1993, No. 3. P. 11. (in Russian)
- Zhavoronkova S. M. Two artists are two worlds.—The Evening Petersburg, 1991, December 20. (RUS).
- Gorskaya M. In the hour of the equinox.—Leningradskaya Pravda, 1991, June 26. (in Russian)
- Kamensky A. A. Что значит быть современным? Ответ на этот вопрос ищут молодые художники. (Review of two youth Leningrad's and Moscow's art exhibitions) // Pravda, 1988, September 9. (in Russian)

=== Exhibition catalogs ===
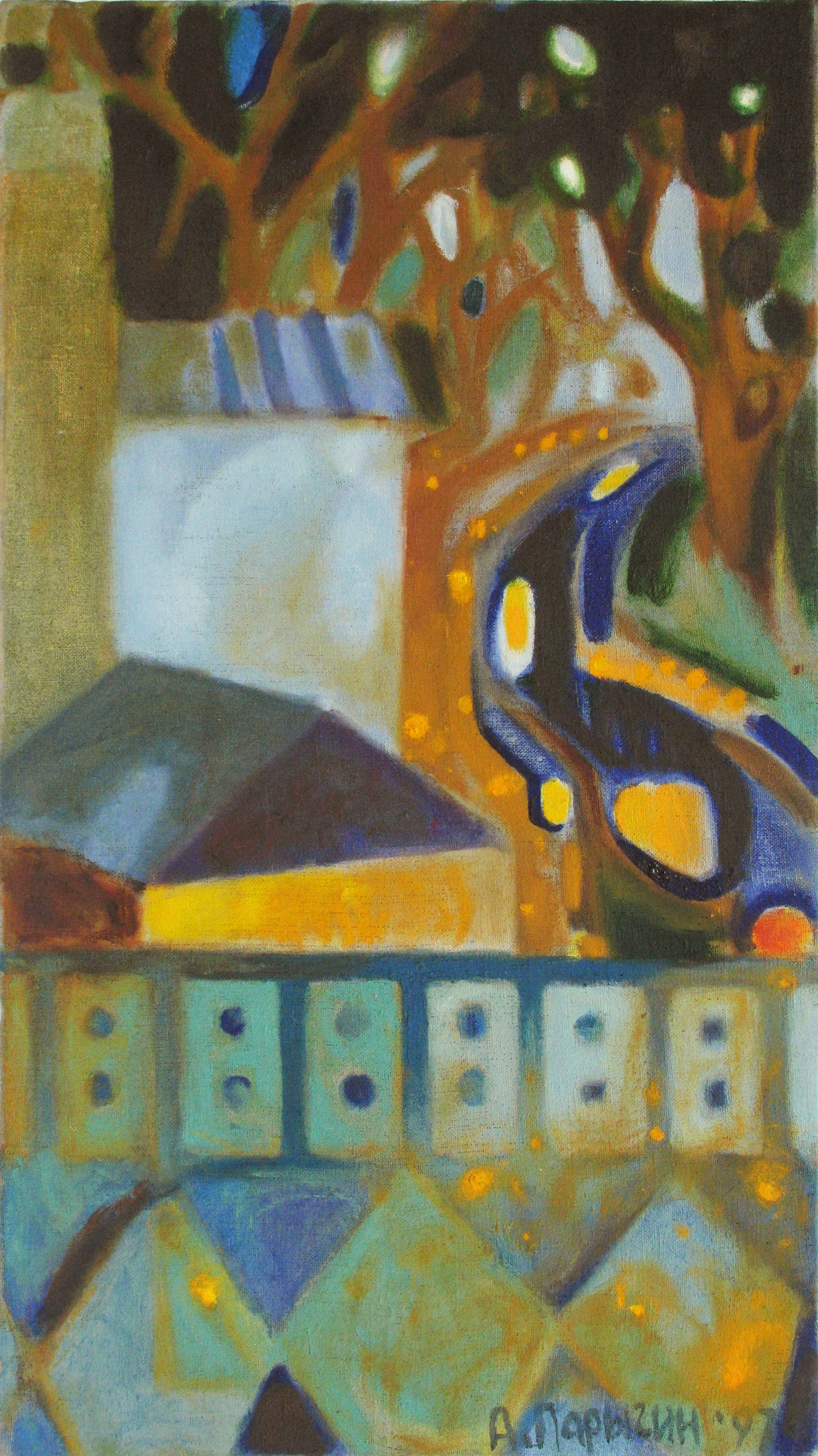
The Romantic Landscape. 1997, oil on canvas

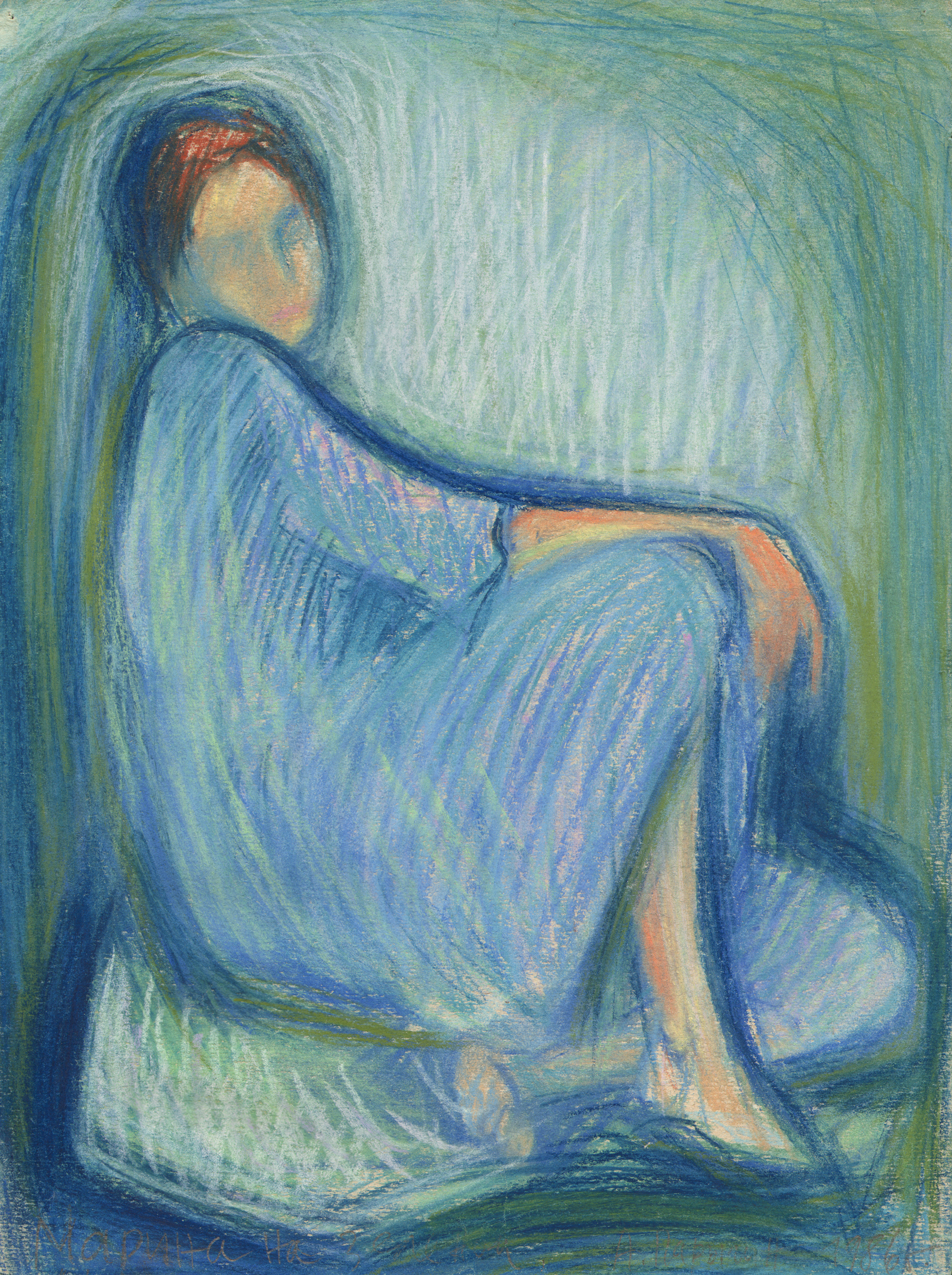
Marina on Green. 1986, paper, pastel

- Posturbanism: Back to the Future. Alexey Parygin. Engravings, art objects, collection. Authors of the articles: Konokotina L., Kononikhin N. St. Petersburg: BKG. 2023. 24 pp. (RUS)
- Kolekcija. Iespiedgrafika Latvijas Nacionālās bibliotēkas Mākslas krājumā/ Mākslas krājumā. Dmitrijs Zinovjevs, Mārtiņš Mintaurs, Anda Boluža. Rīga: National Library of Latvia. 2022. 230 lpp. ISBN 9789934610240
- Imago Mundi/ Beyond the Black square. Contemporary Artists from St. Petersburg. Texts: Luciano Benetton, Liliana Malta, Gleb Ershov. Treviso: Antiga Edizioni, 2021. 480 pp. P. 308-309. ISBN 978-88-8435-135-7
- III Международная триеннале современной графики в Новосибирске. Новосибирский государственный художественный музей. Novosibirsk: Изд-й дом «Вояж». 2021. 276 с.
- Second International Print Biennale (07.09—07.11.2019). Yerevan. 2021. P. 357.
- City as Artist's subjectivity. Artist's book project. Catalog. Authors of the articles: Parygin A.B., Markov T.A., Klimova E.D., Borovsky A.D., Severyukhin D.Ya., Grigoryants El., Blagodatov N.I. (Rus & En) SPb: Ed. T. Markova. 2020. 128 pp. ISBN 978-5-906281-32-6
- The Looking Glass and Through It. International art project. Catalog / Зеркала и зазеркалье. Международный выставочный проект. Каталог. МИСП. Авт. вст. статей: Толстая О., Шакирова Л., Пацюков В., Ипполитов А. Saint Petersburg: НП-Принт. 2020. 208 с.
- Печатная графика Санкт-Петербургских художников / Каталог. Авт. вст. ст.: Н. Ю. Кононихин, А. Б. Парыгин. СПб.: СПбСХ. 2020. — 192 с. ISBN 978-5-6043891-1-9
- 4-я Казанская международная биеннале печатной графики "Всадник". Каталог / Авт. вст. ст. О. Л. Улемнова. Kazan: Заман. 2019. 128 с. ISBN 9785442801408
- IX Международная выставка Уральской триеннале печатной графики. Каталог / Авт. сост. И. Н. Оськина. Ufa. 2019. 216 с.
- Artisterium XII. Artisterium On the Road // Catalog (7 notebooks in the cover). Tbilisi: Artisterium. 2019.
- Nuire № 5. Quatrième biennale internationale de poésie visuelle d’Ille sur Tet Catalogne nord // Catalog. Ille-sur-Têt. 2019. 95 pp. P. 82.
- 5ª Bienal Internacional de Gravura "Lívio Abramo" // Catalog. Araraquara. 2019. 23 pp.
- OSTEN BIENNIAL of DRAWING Skopje 2018 // Catalog. Skopje: Остен музеј на цртеж 2018. 224 рp. ISBN 978-608-4837-04-6
- V Фотобиеннале современной фотографии. Русский музей // Каталог. Saint Petersburg: Palace Editions, Russian Museum. 2018. 240 с.
- MicroMacroCosm // Catalog. Mumbai. IPEP. 2018. 24 pp.
- Il PIACERE NEI LIBRI rassegna di arte erotica dagli ex libris ai libri d’artista // Catalogo Biennale del libro d’artista IV Edizione. Naples: Lineadarte, 2018. 180 pp.
- Third International Printmaking Biennial in Cacak // Catalog. Čačak. 2018. 105 рp.
- “17. INTERBIFEP” Mezinárodní bienále festivalu portrétu // Catalog. Tuzla: Mezinárodní portrétní galerie Tuzla. 2018. 186 pp.
- Die Verwandlung. 25 Jahre russische Künstlerbücher 1989—2013. LS collection Van Abbemuseum Eindhoven. Antje Theise, Klara Erdei, Diana Franssen. Eindhoven, 2013. 120 pp.
- 黑龙江美术出版社(黑龍江美術出版社) Heilongjiang Fine Arts Publishing House. Harbin (哈尔滨). (中国). Chief Editor Chen Fenyue. Executive Chief Editor Catherine Druzhinin. V. 1. Graphics St. Petersburg. 2013. 292 pp.
- V Bienal Internacional de la Acurela. Articolo introduttivo: Dr. Gerardo Estrada, A. Guati Rojo. Mexico City, 2002. 88 pp.
- Петербург 95; Петербург 96; Петербург 97; Петербург 98; Петербург 2000; Петербург 2011. Авт. вст. ст.: Л. Скобкина. Saint Petersburg: Saint Petersburg Manege, 1996; 1997; 1998; 1999; 2001; 2012, ил.
- II-й Международный фестиваль экспериментальных искусств и перформанса/ Каталог. Авт. вст. ст.: Л. Скобкина. Saint Petersburg: Saint Petersburg Manege, 1998. 63 с.
- Равноденствие// Буклет к выставке на Невском 20. Автор вступит. ст. Юдина Т. К. Галерея ТСХ. Saint Petersburg., 1991.
