= Nevsky-25 =

Former Russian artist group

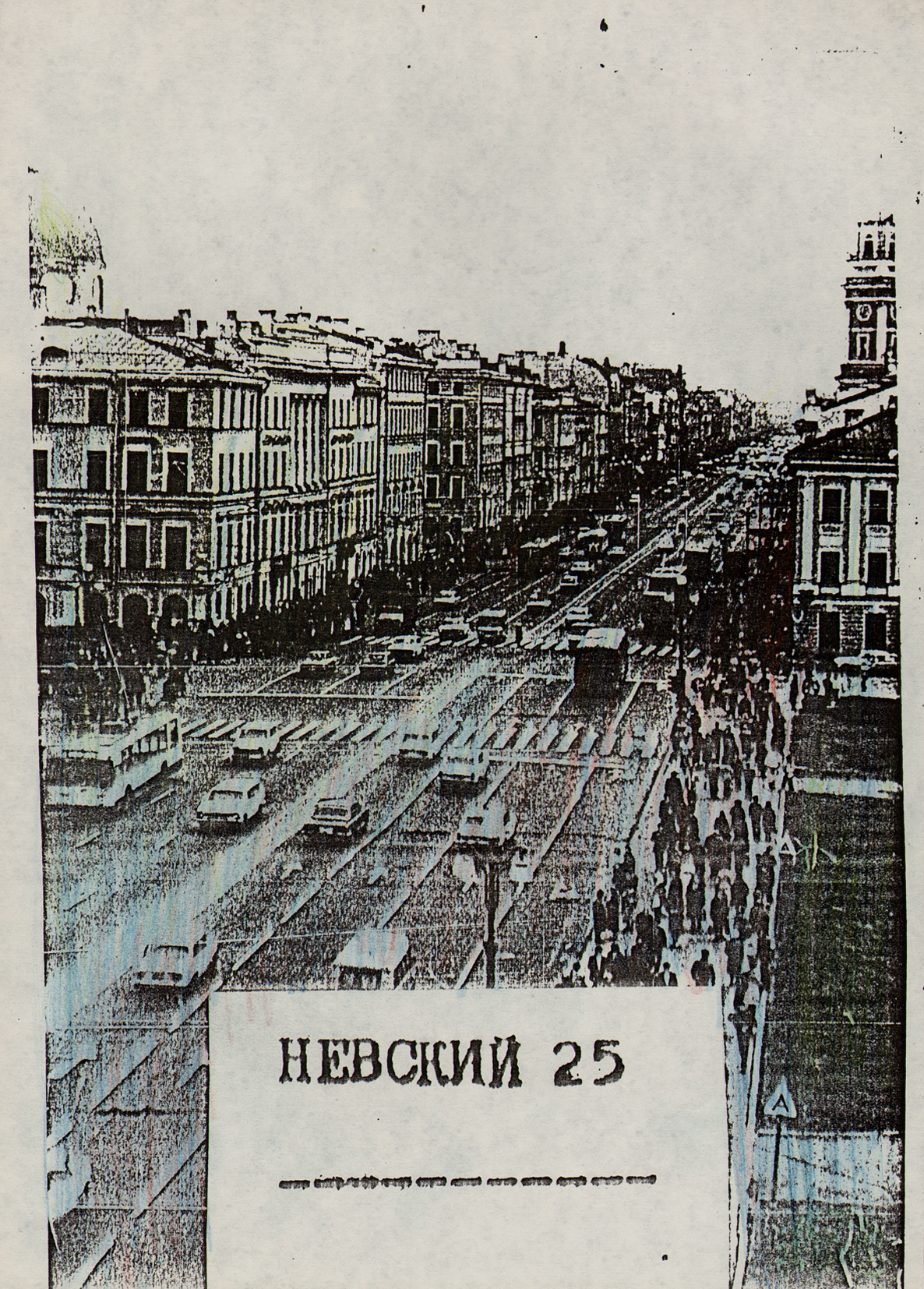
Nevsky–25. Book title/ A poetry collection. 1989

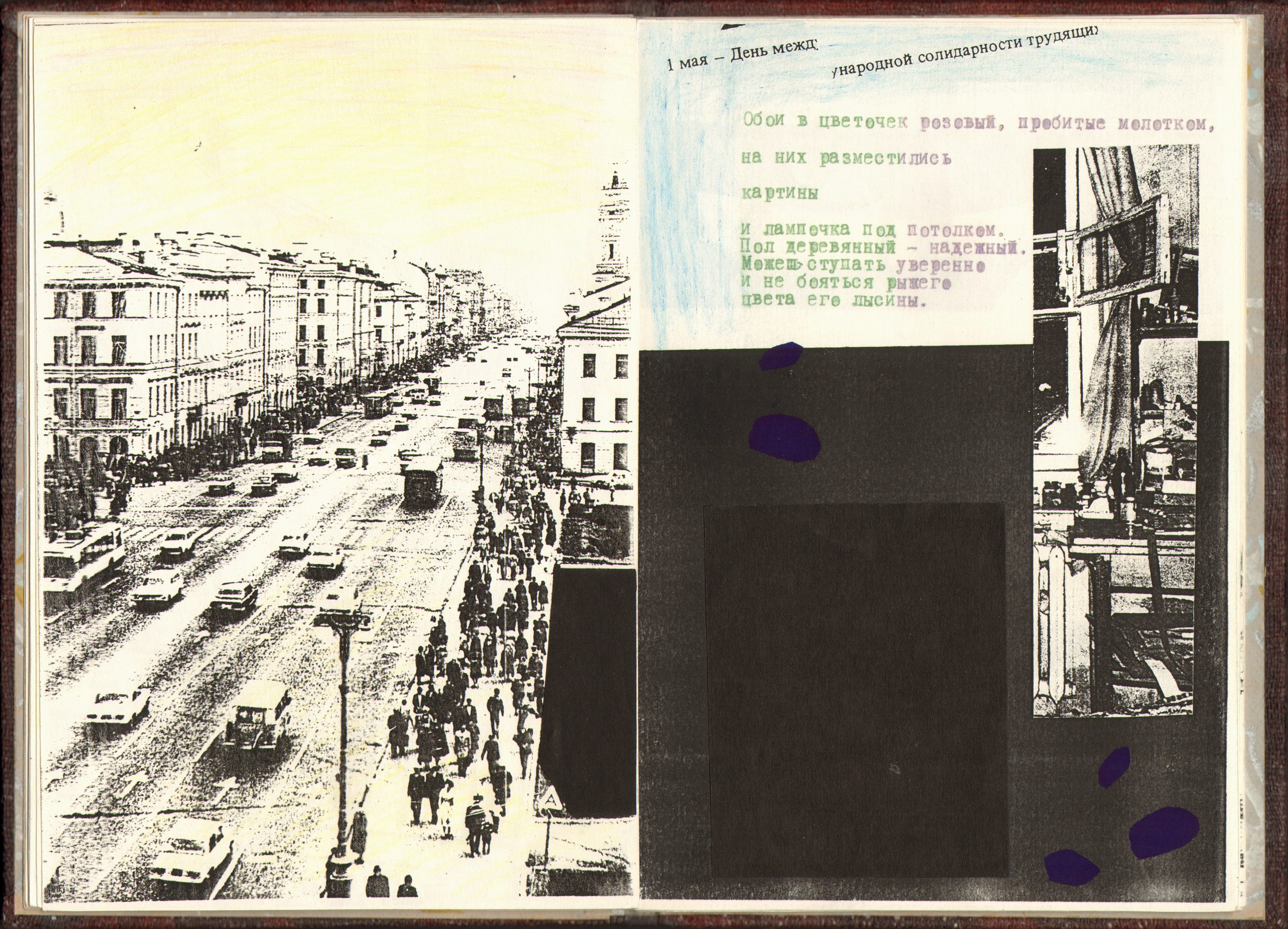
A. Parygin Moja mansarda. Book spread. 1990

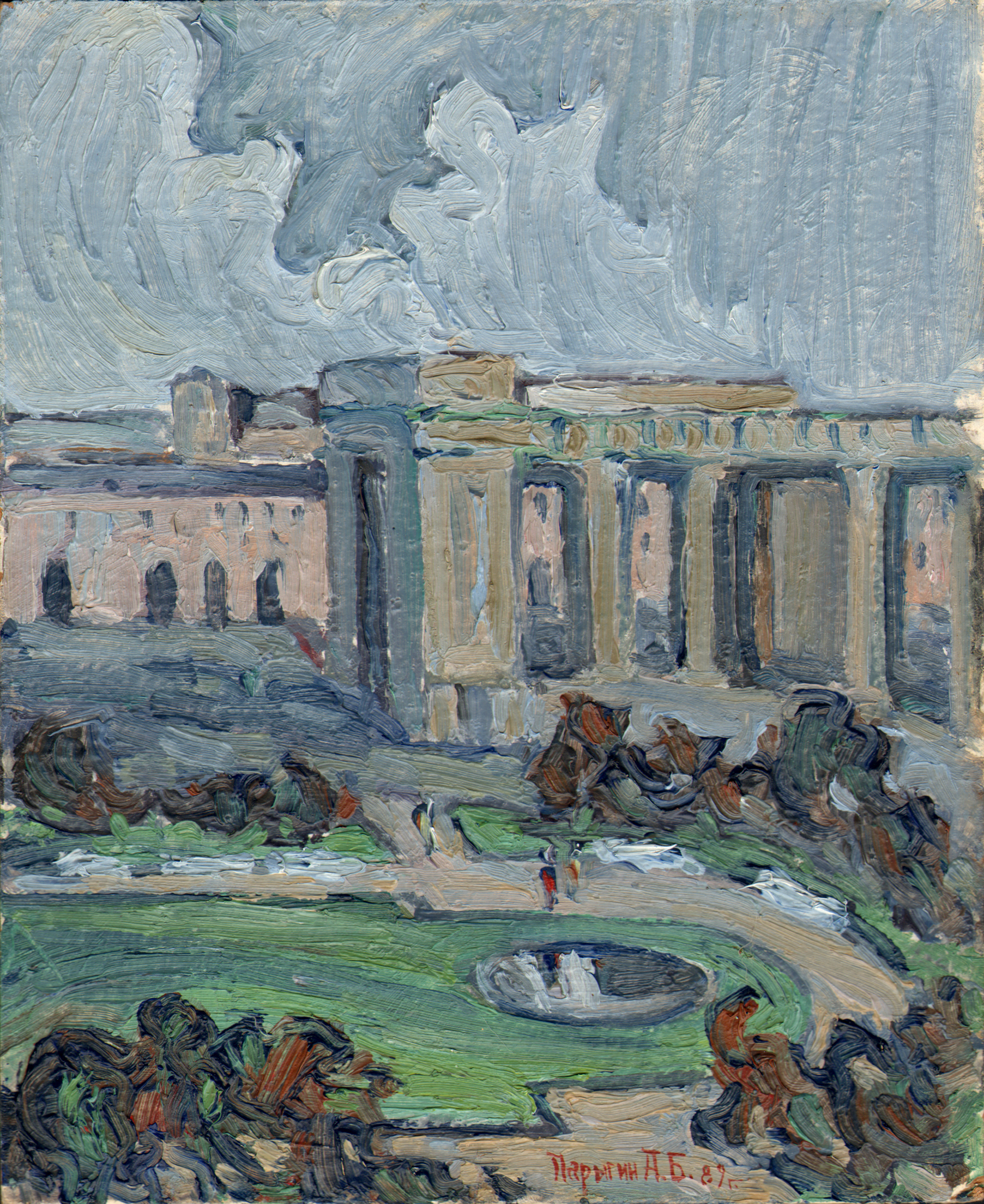
A. Parygin Kazan Cathedral from the Window Workshop. 1989, oil on canvas

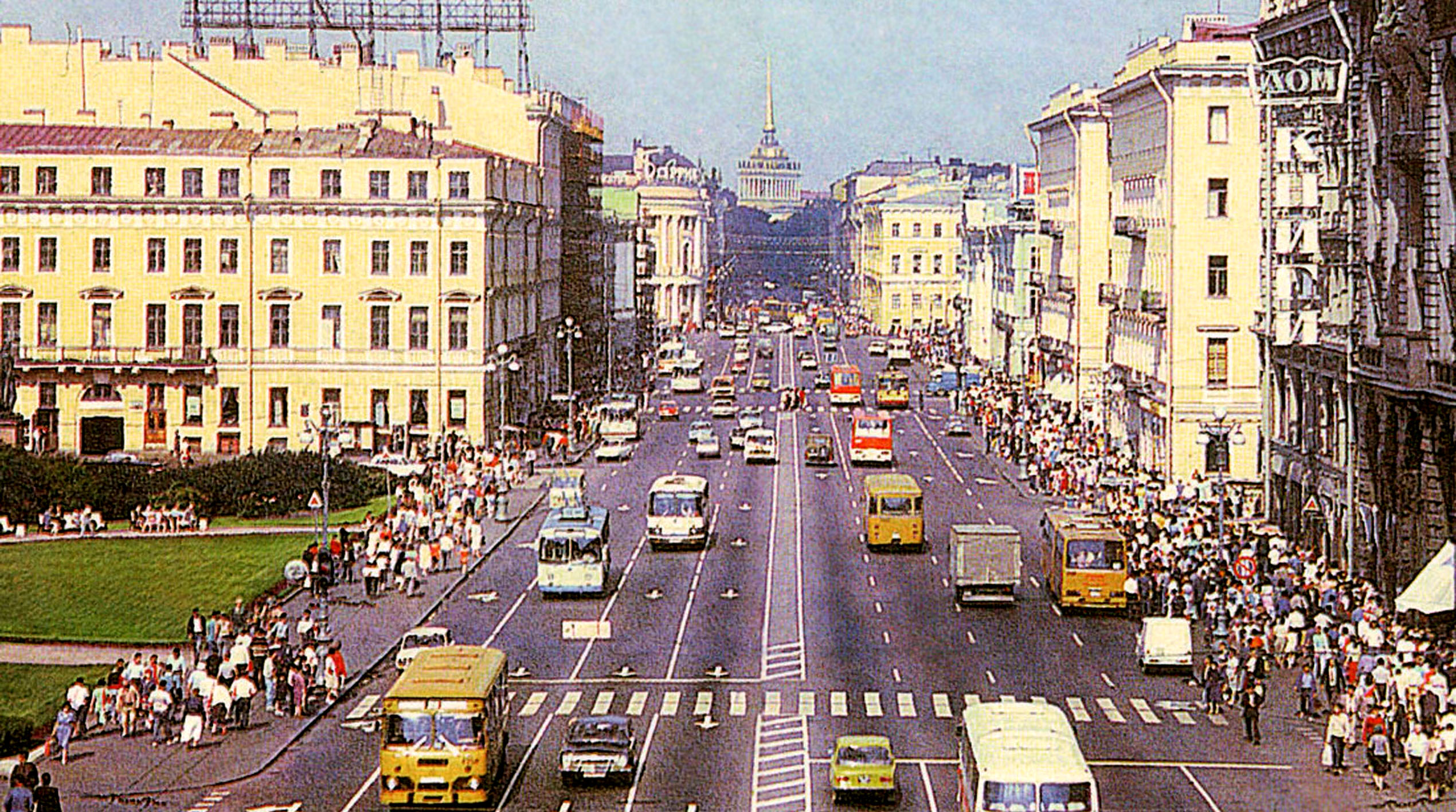
Panorama of Nevsky Prospect. Kazan Cathedral House (on the left). 1987, photo

Nevsky–25 (Russian: Не́вский–25, romanized: Névskiy–25) was a group of Russian underground culture artists (1987–1990). Association of artists and squatters’ workshop in the time of perestroika in the Soviet Union. Date of creation–March 13, 1987. The founder is Alexey Parygin. Location: Top floor of Kazan Cathedral House. Leningrad, Nevsky Prospect, 25 & Kazanskaya street, 1.

== History ==
The history of art squat began on March 13, 1987—on that day, the former shared apartment No. 20 in the apartment building under repair was annexed by artists. This association not only had no official status, but was literally underground.

The double front doors were skillfully camouflaged, barred up with meter-long sheets of old partially rusted tin with inch-thick boards nailed across them. Thick curved nails (glued with epoxy resin) stuck out of wood and iron. Everything was well thought out and the scenery looked convincing. To the right of the door frame, an inhospitable wire with two bare contacts was hanging. You needed to close them to make the bell ring in the depths of the apartment. In case everyone left the workshop, there was a way to securely close the entrance. For this purpose, a strong and heavy inter-door hook and a system of levers were used. The door could be opened and closed by means of two external rope ends tied to the latch. Seeing this mechanism in action always made an indelible impression on newcomers.

In the workshop, poetry readings and debates on contemporary art were held. Young artists, musicians, and writers exchanged their ideas. Books were self-published. The series [Pesok (The Sand. 1989), Tsvetnye zvuki (The Colored Sounds. 1989), Zelenaia kniga (The Green Book. 1989), Moia mansarda (My Attic. 1990)] and others. Experiments were conducted to create noise music.

Members of the group included Leonid Kiparisov, Marina Parygina, Elena Grigoryants, Andrey Vermishev, Tamara Mitina, Andrey Korolchuk, Alexander Borkov, Vladimir Iosifov, Alexander Fedorov, Anatoly Yasinsky, Anton Nikolaev, Andrey Akishin, Evgenia Drigo and other artists.

Having survived the persecution of the police, the invasion of homeless people and fires in neighboring apartments, the association ceased to exist in June 1990, after all the residents were rehoused and all utilities were cut off.

== Bibliography ==
=== Articles ===
- Alexey Parygin Богема (записки художника) // Volga. Saratov. 2022, # 7-8 (499). — P. 138-145. (RUS)
- Alexey Parygin Про искусство (в ритме автобиографии) // St. Petersburg art notebooks, # 58, St. Petersburg: AIS, 2020. — P. 223-252. (RUS)
- Elena Grigoryants Absorbing the Futurist heritage: Vasily Vlasov and Alexey Parygin / The Futurist Tradition in Contemporary Russian Artists’ Books // International Yearbook of Futurism Studies / Special Issue on Russian Futurism. Ed. by Günter Berghaus. — Berlin & Boston: Walter de Gruyter. Vol. 9 — 2019, 520 p. pp. 269–296. ISBN 978-3-11-064623-8.
- Elena Grigoryants В мастерской Алексея Парыгина «Невский — 25» // St. Petersburg art notebooks, # 38, St. Petersburg: AIS, 2015, pp. 88–92. (RUS)
- Alexey Parygin Невский-25. Субъективные записки художника // St. Petersburg art notebooks, # 31, St. Petersburg: AIS, 2014. — P. 187-194. (RUS)
- Elena Grigoryants «Автографическая книга» в рамках направления Artists book» (книга художника) // XX век. Две России — одна культура: сб. н. трудов по материалам 14-х Смердинских чтений, Volume 160. — St. Petersburg: SPb GUKI, 2006. — P. 96-108. (RUS)
- Elena Grigoryants A"Книга художника": к феноменологии жанра // St. Petersburg art notebooks, # 7, St. Petersburg: AIS, 2006. P. 260-267. (RUS)
- Alexey Parygin Объединение художников "Невский-25″ в контексте своего времени // Bulletin of St. Petersburg State University of Technology and Design. — 2014. — Серия 3. № 1, SPb: SPb GUTD, 2014. — P. 84-92. (RUS)
- Книги и стихи из сквота: Алексей Парыгин и другие // ACT Literary samizdat. Volume 15. St. Petersburg, August-November, 2004. — P. 21-22. (RUS)
- Zhavoronkova S. M. Два художника — два мира // Evening Petersburg, 1991, December 20. (RUS)
- Gorskaya M. В час равноденствия // Leningradskaya Pravda, 1991, June 26. (RUS)
- Aleksandr Kamensky Что значит быть современным? Ответ на этот вопрос ищут молодые художники (Review of two youth Leningrad's and Moscow's art exhibitions) // Pravda, 1988, September 9. (RUS)

=== Artist's book ===
- Alexey Parygin Moia mansarda. — Leningrad: Nevsky-25. 1990. — 24 pp. (RUS)
- Nevsky-25 (A poetry collection A. Parygin, A. Vermishev, A. Lukhityan, A. Razumets, D. Strizhov, S. Firsov). — Leningrad: Nevsky-25, 1990. — 37 pp. (RUS)
