= Colored Sounds =

Artist's book by Alexey Parygin

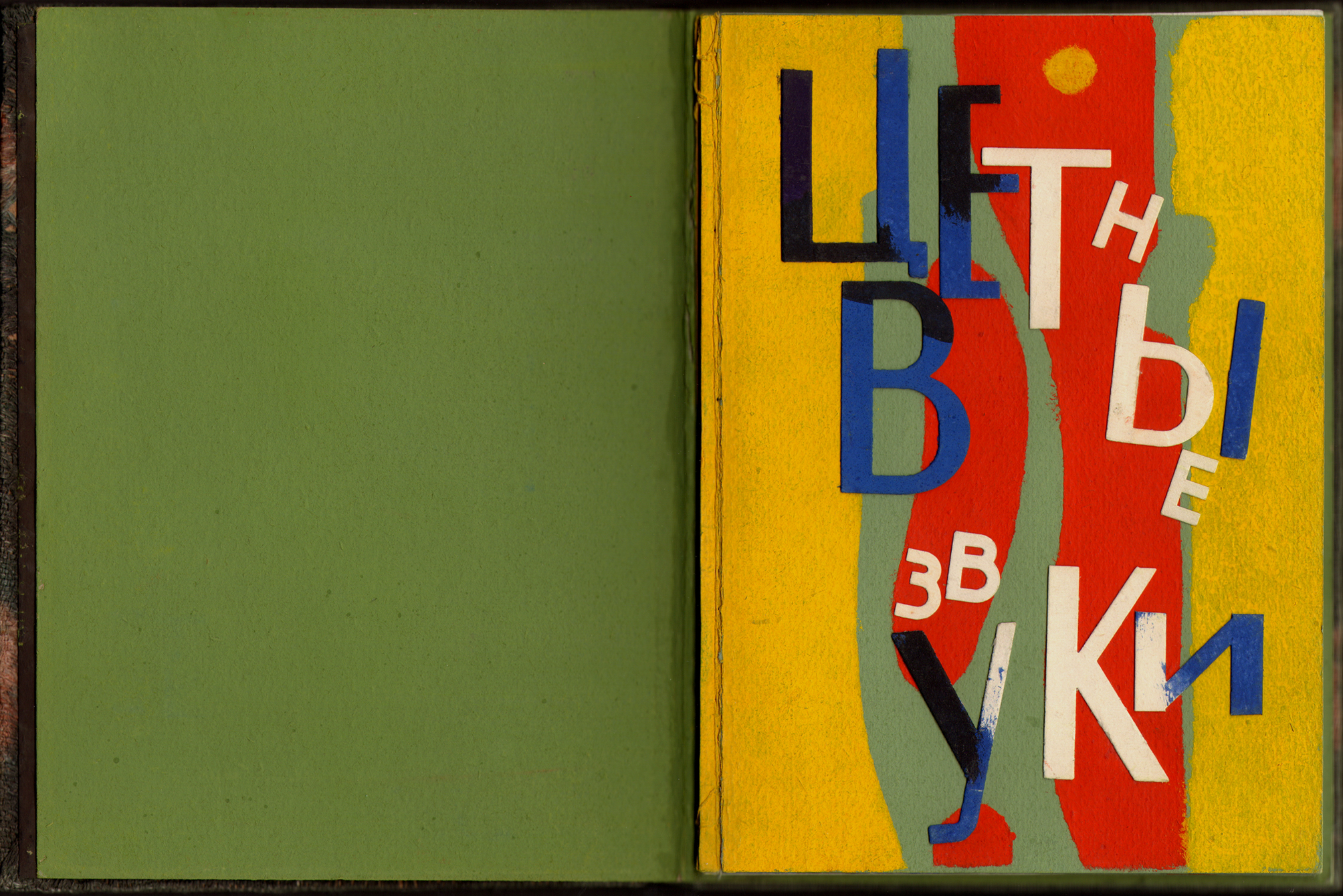
- Book spread with title page
- Author: Alexey Parygin
- Original title: Цветные звуки
- Language: Russian
- Genre: Artists' books
- Publisher: Alexey Parygin
- Publication date: 1989
- Media type: Book
- Pages: 24

The Colored Sounds (Russian: Цветны́е зву́ки, romanized: Tsvetnýe zvúki. 1989) is the second book in a series of four Alexey Parygin author's editions.

== History of creation ==
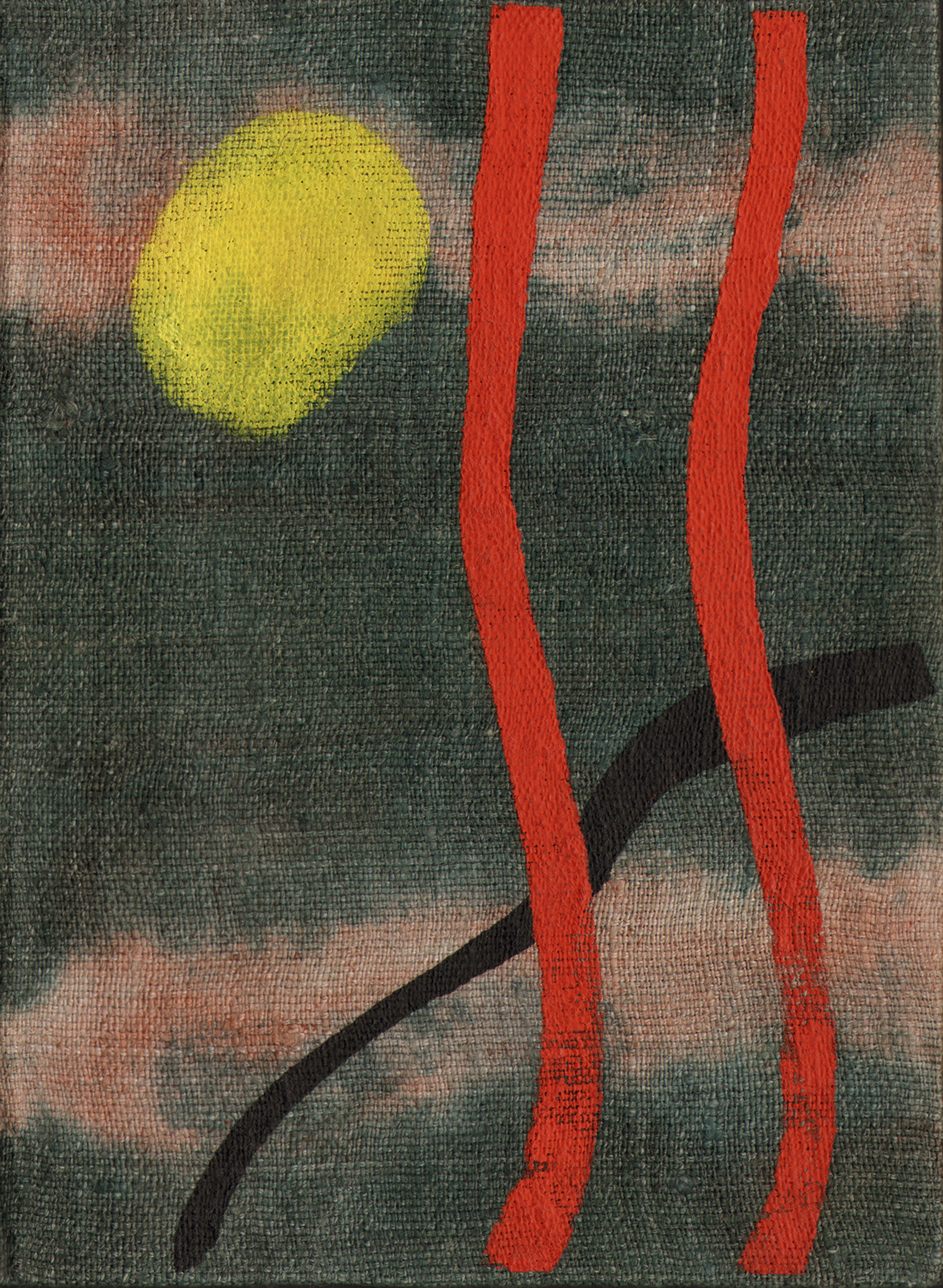
Colored Sounds #3 (Cover). The Saxon State and University Library Dresden Collection/ Artist's Book Foundation

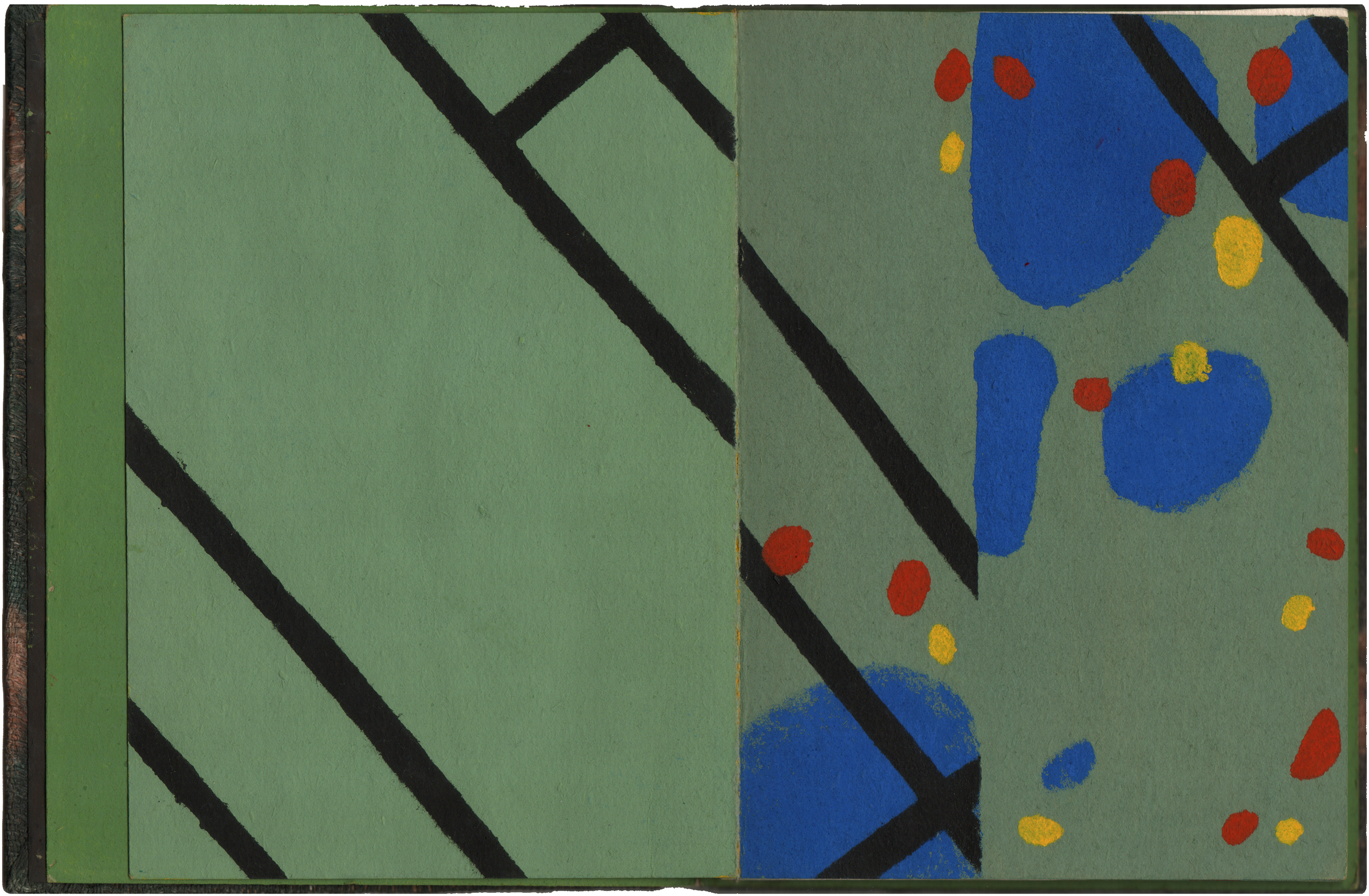
Colored Sounds #1 (Book spread)

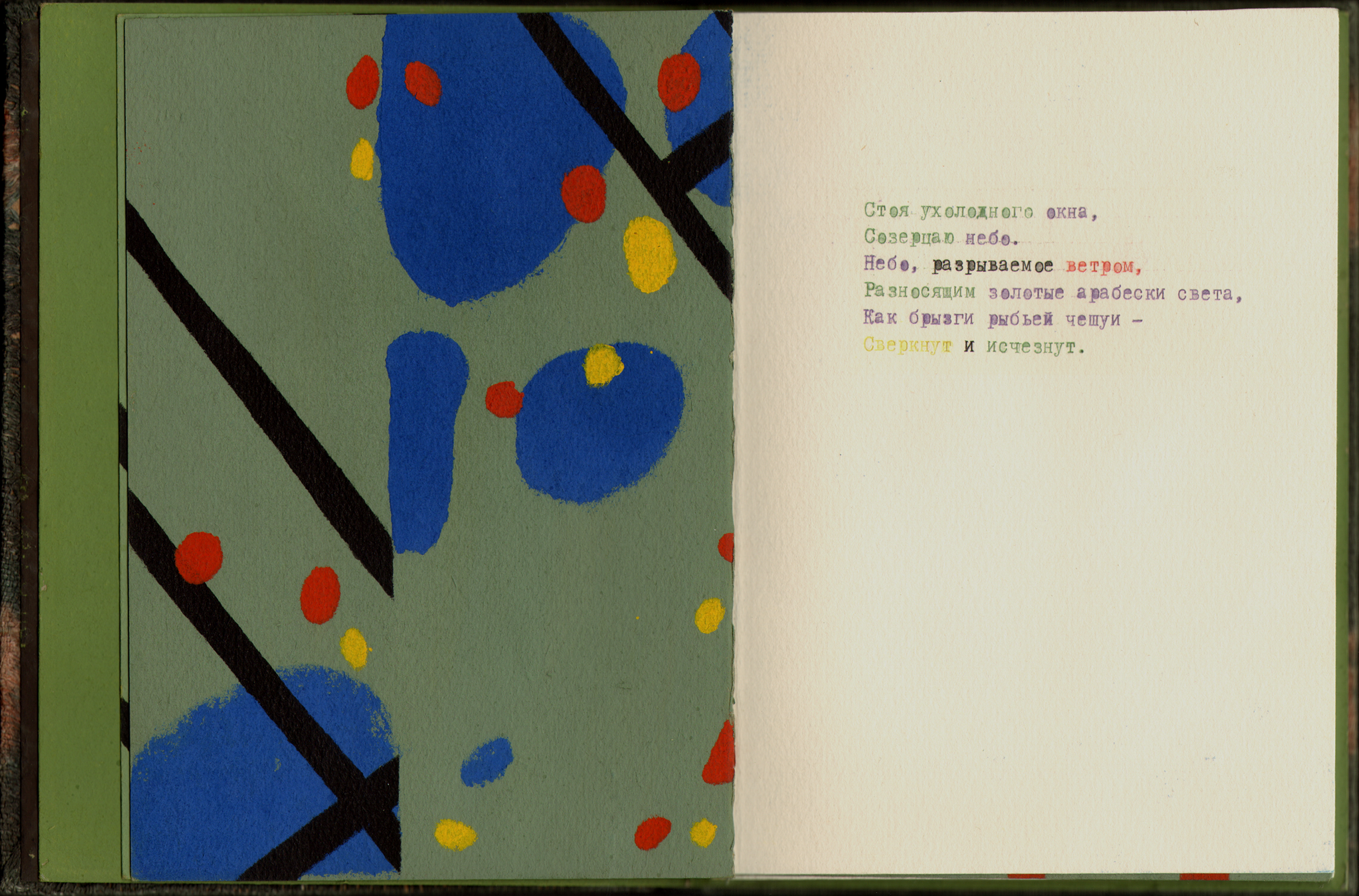
Colored Sounds #2 (Book spread)

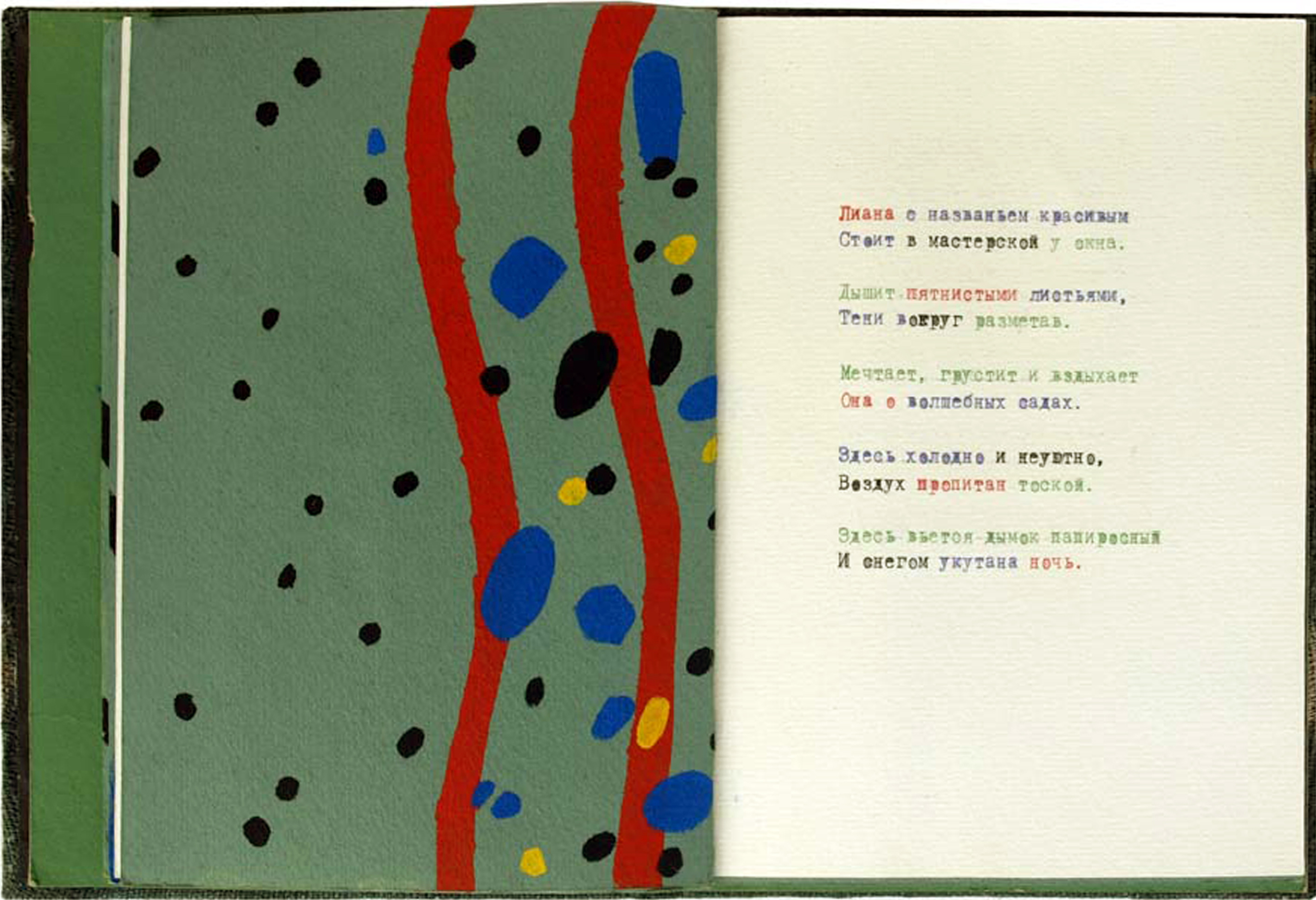
Colored Sounds #6 (Book spread)

The series [Pesok (The Sand. 1989), Tsvetnye zvuki (The Colored Sounds. 1989), Zelenaia kniga (The Green Book. 1989), Moia mansarda (My Attic. 1990)] was created in 1989-1990 at the Nevsky-25 squat workshop (Kazan Cathedral House, Leningrad) on the basis of the artist's own poetic texts, the free-verse poems of 1987-1989. All books have similar format, stylistic unity of design, and are of limited edition.

The Colored Sounds (Cvetnye Zvuki) consist of five short poems and a parallel conventionally-shaped pictorial series printed on stencils (blue, black, scarlet and yellow). In those years, the artist was interested in the problem of synthesis of verbal and visual material in one artwork, so the texts were typed by hand on a typewriter using colored carbon paper (green, purple, red, black and yellow), thereby accentuating the individual elements of the poems. The title page header is made with cardboard letters cut out and tinted with colored gouache. All copies are stitched by hand (except #1). The cover is hand-dyed fabric with a laconic abstract composition. The Colored Soundsis a homage to the artist's book Sounds (German: Klänge) by Russian painter and art theorist Wassily Kandinsky.

A sheet of graphic ‘sounds’ alternates with a poem printed on recto (the sheets’ versos remain blank). The visual elements work as an independent ‘text’ that prompts certain analogies between colour and sound, with which the early twentieth-century avant-garde also experimented, not only in painting, but also in music. Thus, colour is not only a decorative element but it also provides the main ‘sound’ of the book and adds different layers of meaning.

Hardcover, no pagination (24 pages). Circulation—5 numbered and signed copies. Size: 209 × 152 × 15 mm (cover); 209 × 315 mm (book spread). All the work, from layout to circulation, was done by the author himself.

== Collections ==
- Timofey Markov Collection. (St. Petersburg).—″Instance #1″.
- In the property of the author. (St. Petersburg).—″Instance #2″.
- Saxon State and University Library Dresden/ Artist's Book Foundation. (Dresden). Signatur: 2007 8 029473; Barcode: 31480781.—″Instance #3″
- Van Abbemuseum/ LS Collection of Russian Artists' books. (Eindhoven). No. 8820.—″Instance #4″.
- Location' has not been set. (Europe).—″Instance #5″.

== Exhibitions ==
- Contemporary Artist's Books. Department of Prints & Photographs National Library of Russia. Saint Petersburg. December 4, 2023—February 28, 2024.
- Die Verwandlung. 25 Jahre russische Künstlerbücher. Hamburg State and University Library Carl von Ossietzky. Hamburg. December 13, 2013—March 2, 2014; Kiel University Library. Kiel. March 14—April 27, 2014; Van Abbemuseum. Eindhoven. May 31—July 31, 2014.
- Museum "Artist's Book". Erarta. Saint Petersburg. June 9—July 9, 2011.
- Independent Art Festival. Saint Petersburg Manege. Saint Petersburg. November 6—20, 2004.

== Bibliography ==
=== Articles ===
- Alexeeva A. Aleksej Parygin. Parola. Colore. Emozione / Il libro d'artista. Problemi e tendenze nell'arte dei maestri pietroburghesi // Trame di letteratura comparata. — Nuova Editrice Universitaria. Nuova sene anno VIII, numero 8, gennaio-dicembre 2024. 269 p. Рp. 162—163. (in Italian) ISSN 1720-5417 ISBN 978-88-95155-89-0
- Pavlovsky A. S. Designing yourself: About the first books of Alexei Parygin // Сборник материалов двенадцатой научно-практической конференции «Трауготовские чтения 2022» / ed. A. K. Kononova. — St. Petersburg: BKG, 2023. — 360 p. — pp. 153–160. (in Russian) ISBN 978-5-6049512-9-3
- Parygin A. B. Мои ранние авторские книги. — Петербургские искусствоведческие тетради, выпуск 67, СПб: АИС, 2021. — С. 232-241. (in Russian) ISBN 978-5-906442-31-4
- Koshkina O. Yu. Особенности языка графики Алексея Парыгина — семиотический аспект // Сборник материалов десятой научно-практической конференции — "Трауготовские чтения 2020". — СПб, 2021. — 304 с. — С. 149-165. (in Russian)
- Pogarsky M. Книга художника [х]. Том I. Теория (264 с.); Том II. История (180 с.); Том III. Практика (290 с). — М.: Треугольное колесо — 2021. (in Russian) ISBN 978-5-9906919-6-4
- Parygin A. B. Про искусство (в ритме автобиографии) // Петербургские искусствоведческие тетради, выпуск 58, СПб: АИС, 2020. — С. 223-252/ (in Russian)
- Grigoryants El. Absorbing the Futurist heritage: Vasily Vlasov and Alexey Parygin / The Futurist Tradition in Contemporary Russian Artists’ Books // International Yearbook of Futurism Studies / Special Issue on Russian Futurism. Ed. by Günter Berghaus. Berlin & Boston: Walter de Gruyter. Vol. 9—2019, 520 p. Pp. 269–296. (in German) ISBN 978-3-11-064623-8.
- Parygin A. B. Книга художника как форма искусства // «Искусство печатной графики: история и современность». В сб. н. статей по материалам научной конференции Четвертые казанские искусствоведческие чтения 19-20 ноября 2015. — Казань: ГМИИ РТ, 2015. — С. 75-78, ил. (in Russian)
- Grigoryants El. Искусство книги и книга в искусстве // Первая Балтийская биеннале искусства книги: каталог выставки. — СПб, 2014. — С. 6-9. (in Russian)
- Grigoryants El. Образ текста в современной петербургской «книге художника» и livre d`artiste // Печать и слово Санкт-Петербурга: Сборник научных трудов. Ч.1 — СПб., 2014. (in Russian)
- Grigoryants El. «Автографическая книга» в рамках направления «Artists book» («книга художника» // XX век. Две России — одна культура: Сборник научных трудов по материалам 14 Смирдинских чтений. — СПб, 2006. (in Russian)
- Grigoryants El. Диалоги культур в современной петербургской книге художника // Книжная культура Петербурга: Сборник научных трудов по материалам 13 Смирдинских чтений. — СПб: СПбГИК, 2004. (in Russian)
- Книги и стихи из сквота: Алексей Парыгин и другие // АКТ Литературный самиздат. Выпуск 15. СПб, август-ноябрь, 2004. — С. 21-22. (in Russian)
- Grigoryants El. «Книга художника» в современном петербургском искусстве // Актуальные проблемы теории и истории библиофильства: Материалы 8 международной научной конференции. — СПб., 2001 — С. 124–128. (in Russian)

=== Exhibition catalogues ===
- Die Verwandlung. 25 Jahre russische Künstlerbücher 1989-2013. LS collection Van Abbemuseum Eindhoven (Exhibition catalogue). Auth. articles: Serge-Aljosja Stommels, Antje Theise, Klara Erdei, Diana Franssen. Eindhoven, 2013. 120 pp., col. ill. P. 16—17. (in German) ISBN 978-90-79393-11-4
- Museum "Artist's Book". (Exhibition catalogue. Erarta. Saint Petersburg. Auth. articles: M. Pogarsky, M. Karasik, E. Klimova, Yu. Samodurov. SPb. 2011. 200 pp., col. ill. P. 38. (in Russian)
