= Tatyana Danilyants =

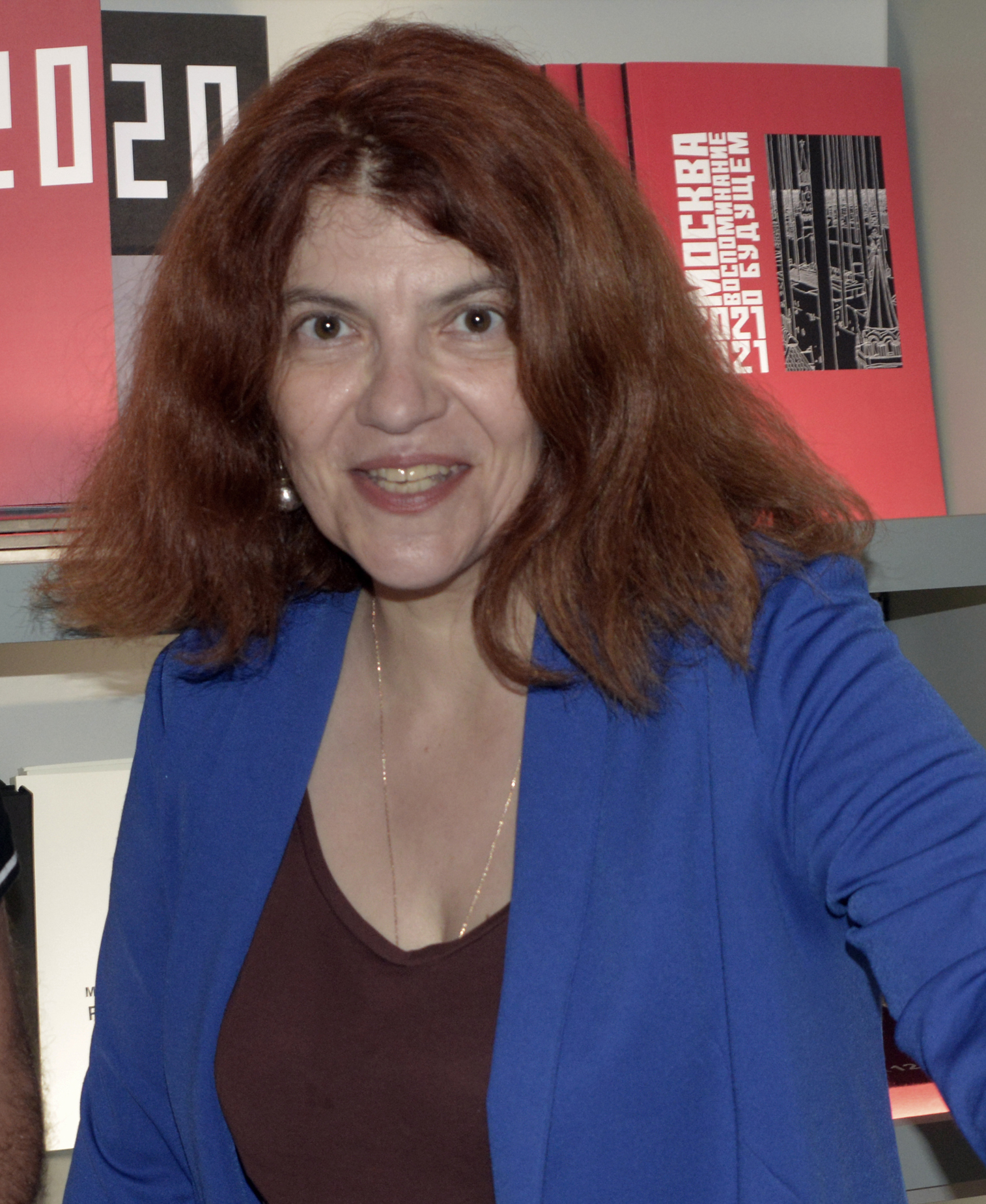
Tatyana Danilyants

Tatyana Sergeevna Danilyants (Russian: Татья́на Серге́евна Данилья́нц, IPA: [tɐˈtʲjanə sʲɪrˈɡʲe(j)ɪvnə dənʲɪˈlʲjants]; born 1971) is a Russian film director, photographer and poet.

She is of Armenian descent. She studied in Moscow, then at the Peggy Guggenheim Collection in Venice, Italy. In 1997 she attended courses by Andrzej Wajda.

Her films include U, Фрески снов ("Frescoes of Dreams"), Сад, который скрыт ("The Hidden Garden") and others, and her poetic books Венецианское ("Venetian [Poems]", 2005) and Белое ("White [Poems]", 2006). She was awarded the Italian Nosside poetry prize in 2008. In 2011 she exhibited her project Anima Russa ("Russian Soul"), consisting of photos and glass sculptures, at the contemporary art gallery of Venice Projects, in Venice.
