= Klänge =

1912 book by the Russian expressionist artist Wassily Kandinsky

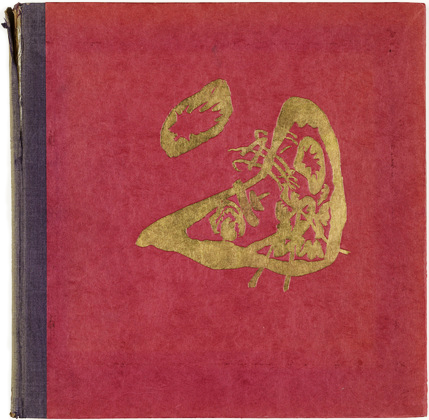
Klänge, Wassily Kandinsky, 1912

Klänge (German; Sounds) is a book by the Russian expressionist artist Wassily Kandinsky. Published in an edition of 345 in Munich in late 1912, the work is a famous early example of an artist's book, containing both poems and woodcuts by the artist, forming two parallel strands, each involving a loose progression. One of three seminal books that Kandinsky published between 1911 and 1912 - the other two being Concerning the Spiritual in Art and Der Blaue Reiter Almanac that he edited with Franz Marc - Klänge was to have a direct and lasting influence on Expressionism, Dada and Russian Futurism.

[Kandinsky] began writing prose-poems, composing 38 altogether between 1908 and 1912. In 1913 these were published by Piper Verlag under the title Sounds, accompanied by colour and black-and-white woodcuts. in these Dadaistic poems, Kandinsky employs a method borrowed from young children's early attempts at speech; through constant repetition and babbling words are emptied of their meaning, so that only the pure sound remains. It is Kandinsky's aim to uncover this "pure sound" of language, the sound which "sets the soul vibrating."

"We fought for painting, but painting alone will not suffice. I had the idea of a synthetic book that removed half of the old, narrow conceptions, breaking down the walls between the arts.... and finally prove that the problem of art is not a problem of form but a problem of spiritual content." Kandinsky,

== Klänge, expressionism and Zürich dada ==
An inner spread from Klänge, Wassily Kandinsky, 1912

Whilst the relationship between expressionism and dada are complex, one critic has compared them to two twins fighting, 'like Tweedledee and Tweedledum', there are numerous links between the two movements. In Berlin, key dadaists such as Raoul Hausmann, George Grosz and Kurt Schwitters all started their careers as Expressionists, whilst in Switzerland, two of the founders of Dada, Hugo Ball and Hans Arp had formulated a number of key concepts embodied by Zürich Dada, such as an affinity to abstract art and a belief in theatre 'bursting forth from the roots of all dramatic life' - in Munich as part of the group centred on Kandinsky at the time that Klänge was published.

Both Arp and Ball had been involved with Kandinsky's group Der Blaue Reiter before the First World War; Arp contributed to the first almanac and exhibited work in the second group exhibition, whilst Ball edited a second almanac with Kandinsky - Das Neue Theater (Almanac of New Theatre) - that was only abandoned due to the outbreak of World War I. A number of poems from Klänge were read out during performances at the Zürich Dada nightclub the Cabaret Voltaire, and two of these were included in the magazine of the same name, published 15 May 1916.

Hans Arp was so enamoured of his copy, that later in his life he would allow no-one except himself and his wife (Sophie Taeuber-Arp) to read it.

"Kandinsky has undertaken the rarest spiritual experiments in his poems. Out of 'pure existence' he has conjured beauties never previously heard in this world. In these poems, sequences of words and sentences surface in a way that has never happened before... Kandinsky (..) confronts the reader with a dying and transforming image, a dying and transforming phrase, a dying and self-transforming dream. In these poems we experience the cycle, the waxing and waning, the transformation of this world. Kandinsky's poems reveal the emptiness of appearances and of reason." Hans Arp on Klänge

== One of the poems ==
=== Seeing ===
Blue, Blue got up, got up and fell.
Sharp, Thin whistled and shoved, but didn't get through.
From every corner came a humming.
FatBrown got stuck - it seemed for all eternity.
———————————It seemed. It seemed.
You must open your arms wider.
————————————Wider. Wider.
And you must cover your face with red cloth.
And maybe it hasn't shifted yet at all: it's just that you've shifted.
White leap after white leap.
And after this white leap another white leap.
And in this white leap a white leap. In every white leap a white leap.
But that's not good at all, that you don't see the gloom: in the gloom is
——— where it is.
That's where everything begins. . . . . . . . . . . . . . . . . . . . .
With a. . . . . . . . . . . . . . . . . . . . . . Crash. . . . . . . . . . . . . .

1912
