= Aleksandr Kamensky =

Russian art critic and art historian

Aleksandr Kamensky

Aleksandr Abramovich Kamensky (Александр Абрамович Каменский) (1922–1992) was a Soviet art critic and art historian.

In mid-1950s he launched attacks on the art establishment formed during the Stalin era, blaming it for the domination of Stalin's cult of personality and proliferation of mediocre works. He argued that works of art must be judged not only by their ideological correctness and optimism but also by their artistic merits, relying on the expertise of the "genuine" artists, rather than on the dogmas of bureaucratic organizations in arts.

He wrote a number of monographs and articles about prominent artists such as Marc Chagall, Nathan Altman, and Martiros Saryan.

== Selected bibliography ==
- Konenkov (1962)
- Vernisages (1974)
- Nathan Altman (1978)
- Knightly Feat: A Book About The Sculpture of Anna Golubkina (1978) (reprinted as Anna Golubkina, Her Personality, And Age in 1990)
- Etudes on the Artists of Armenia (Erevan, 1979)
- Martiros Sarian (1987)
- Chagall: The Russian Years 1907-1922 (1988–1989)
- Romantic Montage (1989)
- The World of Art Movement in Early 20th Century Russia (with Vsevolod Nikolayevich Petrov)
- Oleg Tselkov (1992)
- Marc Chagall, An Artist From Russia (unabridged version of Chagall: The Russian Years published posthumously)
