= Posturbanism Art Project =

Art project by Alexey Parygin

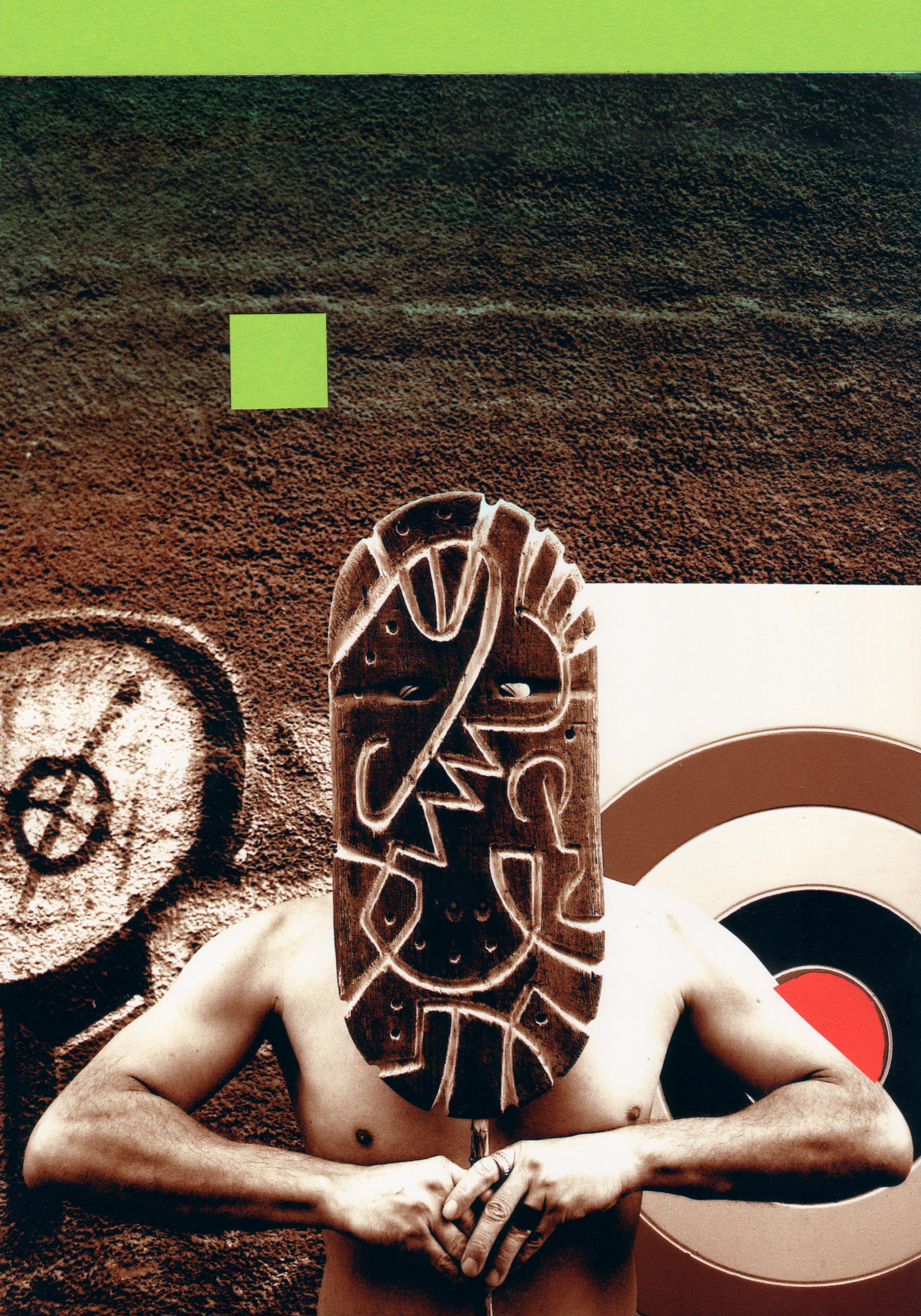
- Artist: Alexey Parygin
- Year: 2000-2022
- Medium: mixed media

Posturbanism Art Project (Russian: Прое́кт Постурбани́зм, romanized: Proyékt Posturbanízm) is an conceptual project and art movement articulated and developed by the artist Alexey Parygin, which gave impetus to the formation of the social and philosophical utopian theory of Posturbanism.

== History ==
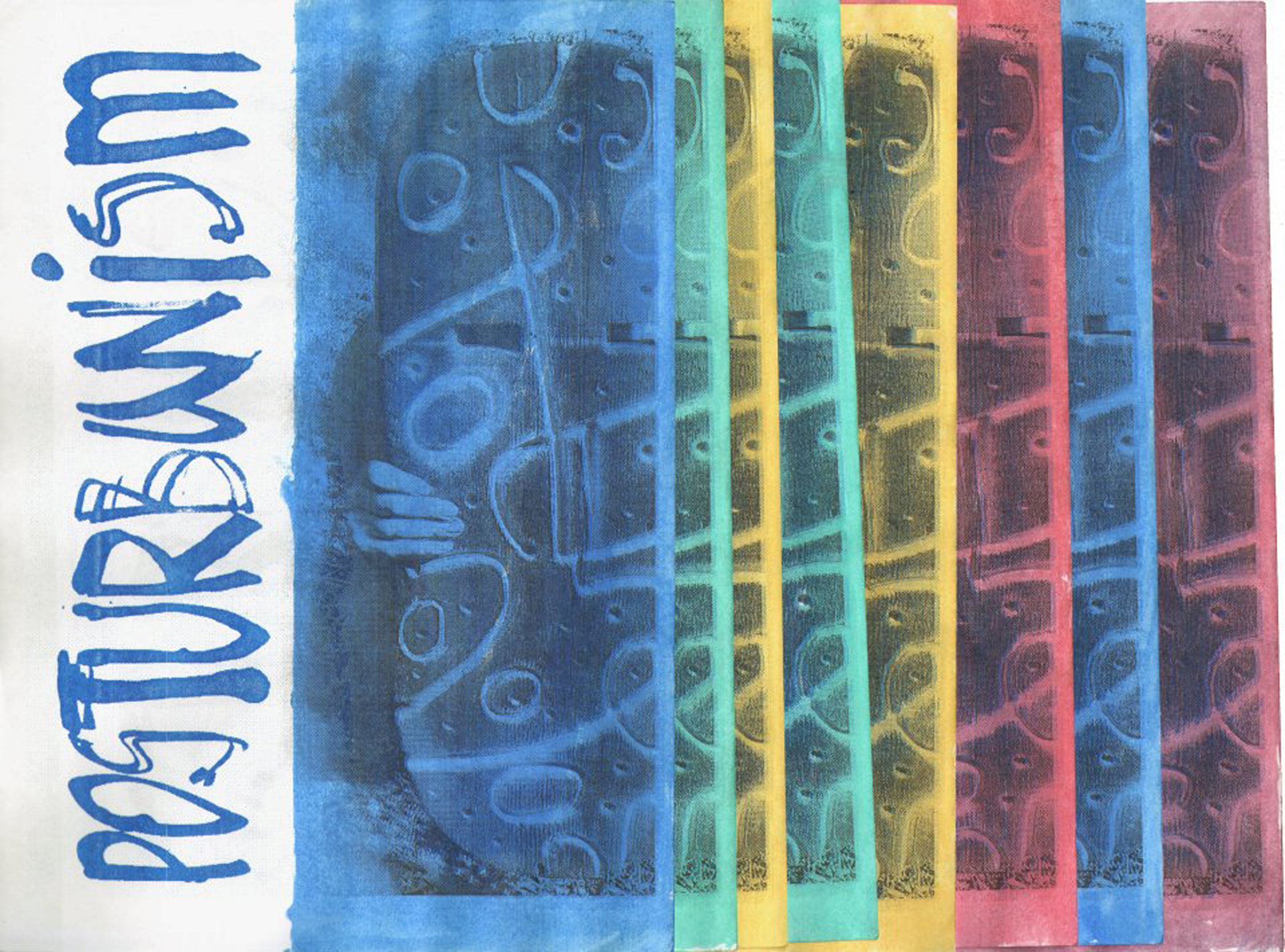
Posturbanism Flyers. 2011

Posturbanism Art Project is the artist's third philosophical manifesto, a continuation of previous big works: Contemplation of Money (1996–2000), Art in the Forest (2000–2005), Art is a Business (2000–2015).

Since 2000, Parygin has been developing the utopian concept of the form of art after the death of art—PostUrbanism. The term posturbanism was publicly introduced by the artist in a manifesto published in the fall of 2010.

In a 2018 article, The Idea and the Manifesto (French: Idée et Manifeste), published in French in art brut magazine Revue Trakt, Alexey Parygin outlined the main theses of the concept. Later, he wrote and published a number of texts clarifying the author's philosophy, where he outlined the conceptual components and visual markers of his idea.

Two groups of wooden objects—Masks and Signs—formed the material basis of the performances.

Masks are the main element of the performances Fire, Water, Earth held in a number of countries: Russia, Finland, Poland, Croatia, Montenegro, Tunisia, etc. The man with the mask is a counterpoint to the culture-nature opposition. The artist, working with the nude body, installs himself (or a model) in natural and urban environments, acting as a marker of the zone of conflict between the natural and the artificial.

== Key ideas ==
A marker of post-urban tendencies in contemporary society, to a certain extent, is the ever-increasing interest in archaic practices of clan-tribal identification: tattoos, scarification, piercing, various types of body deformation, implantation and branding. Modern subcultures are no longer limited solely to slang, graffiti, or image. This social vector is not a random and temporary phenomenon. Rather, on the contrary, human nature, the archetypal nature compressed by artificial boundaries, seeks a way out.

The totem signs were made as self-sufficient sculptural objects, modules of mobile installations. The compositions are a plastic improvisation. Their structure, like the engraving itself, is generally borrowed from nature, reminiscent of the cunning moves of woodworm beetles on the surface of trees.

Appealing to the language of proto-art as a tool most adequate to the program tasks, the project enters into a resonant dialogue-conflict with modern society, its ideologies, ideals, and mythology.

== Exhibitions ==
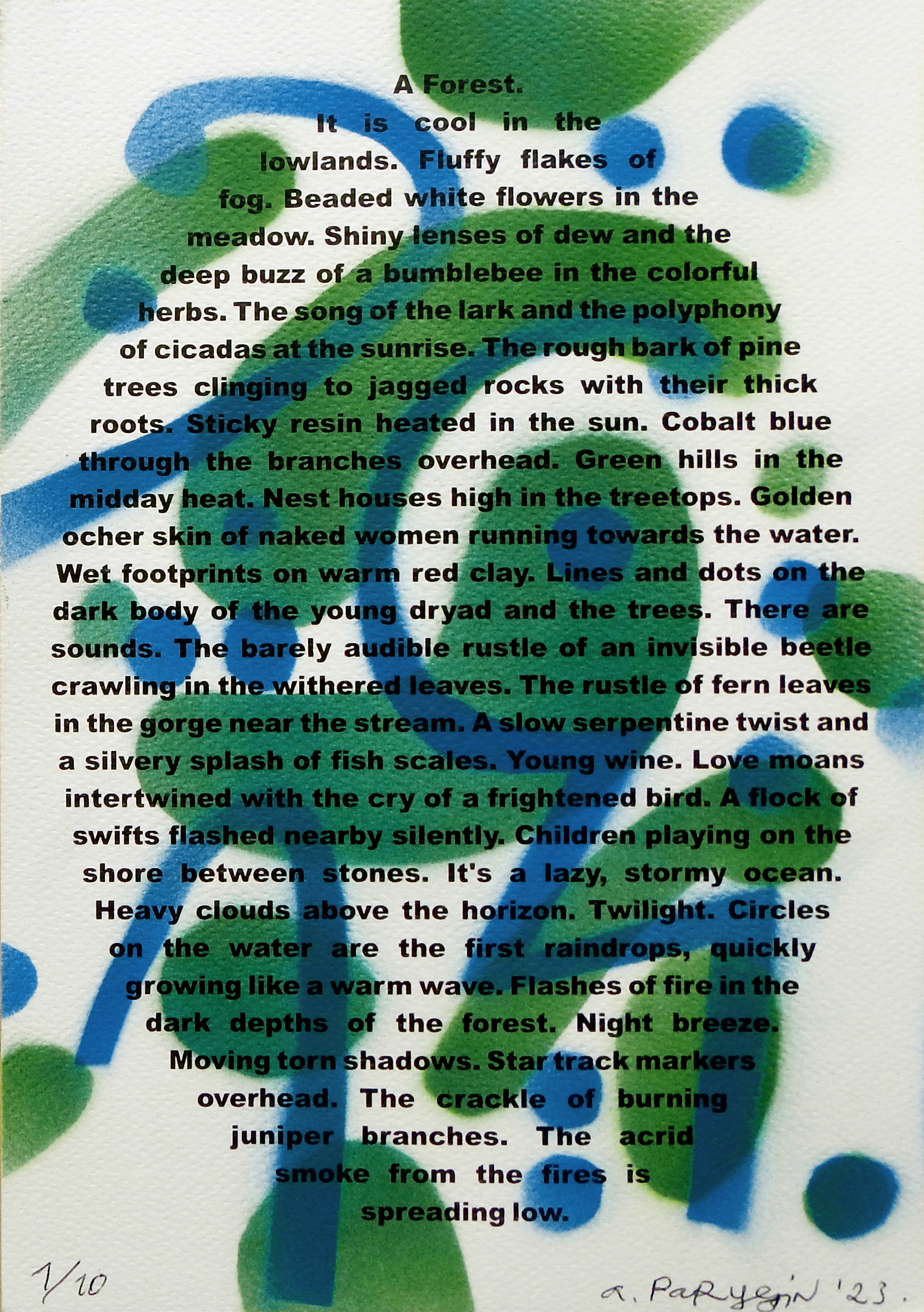
Posturban Poem. Mixed media. 2023

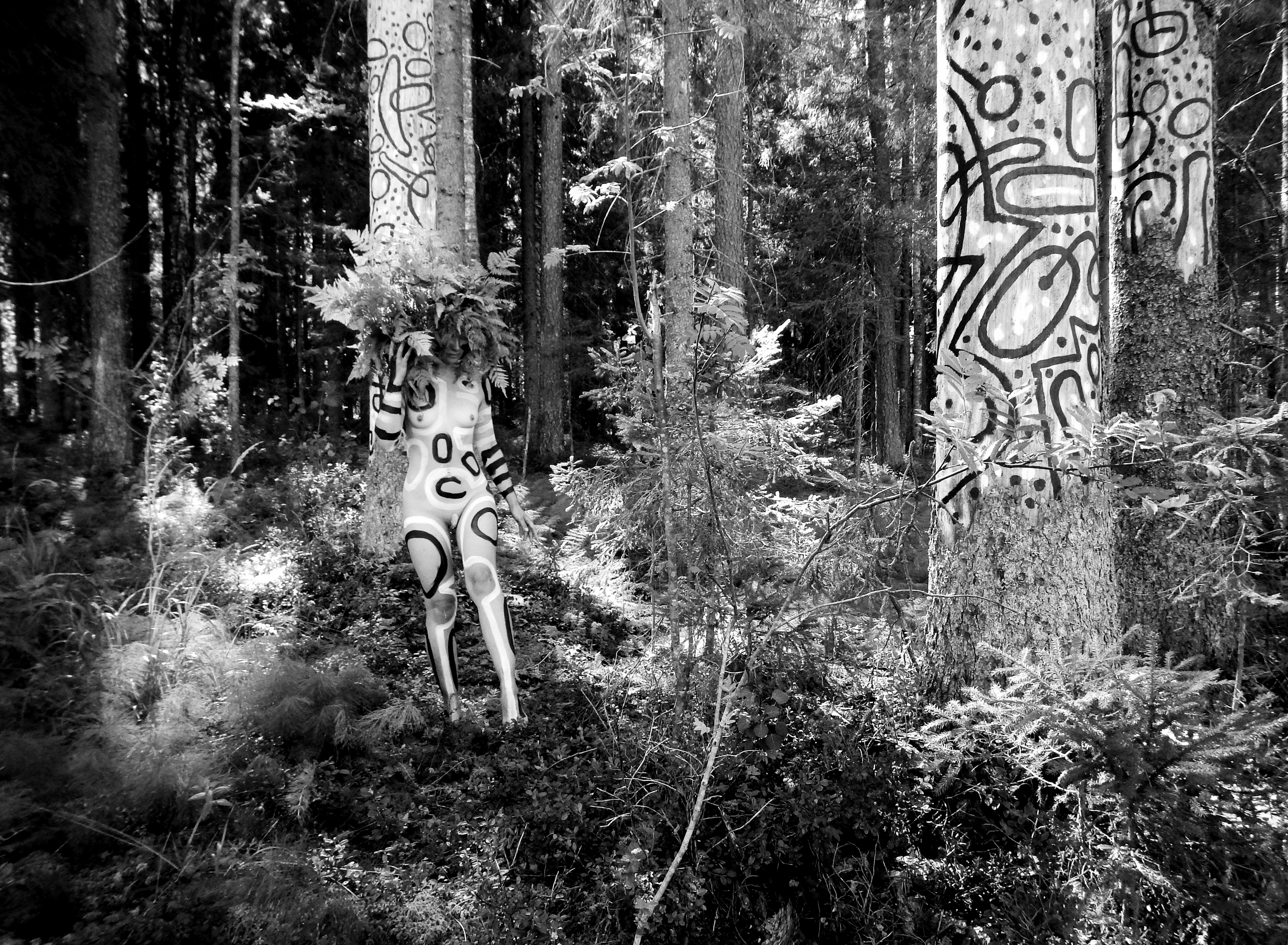
PosturbanForest/ The Forest Art Project. Performance. Karelian Isthmus. 2023

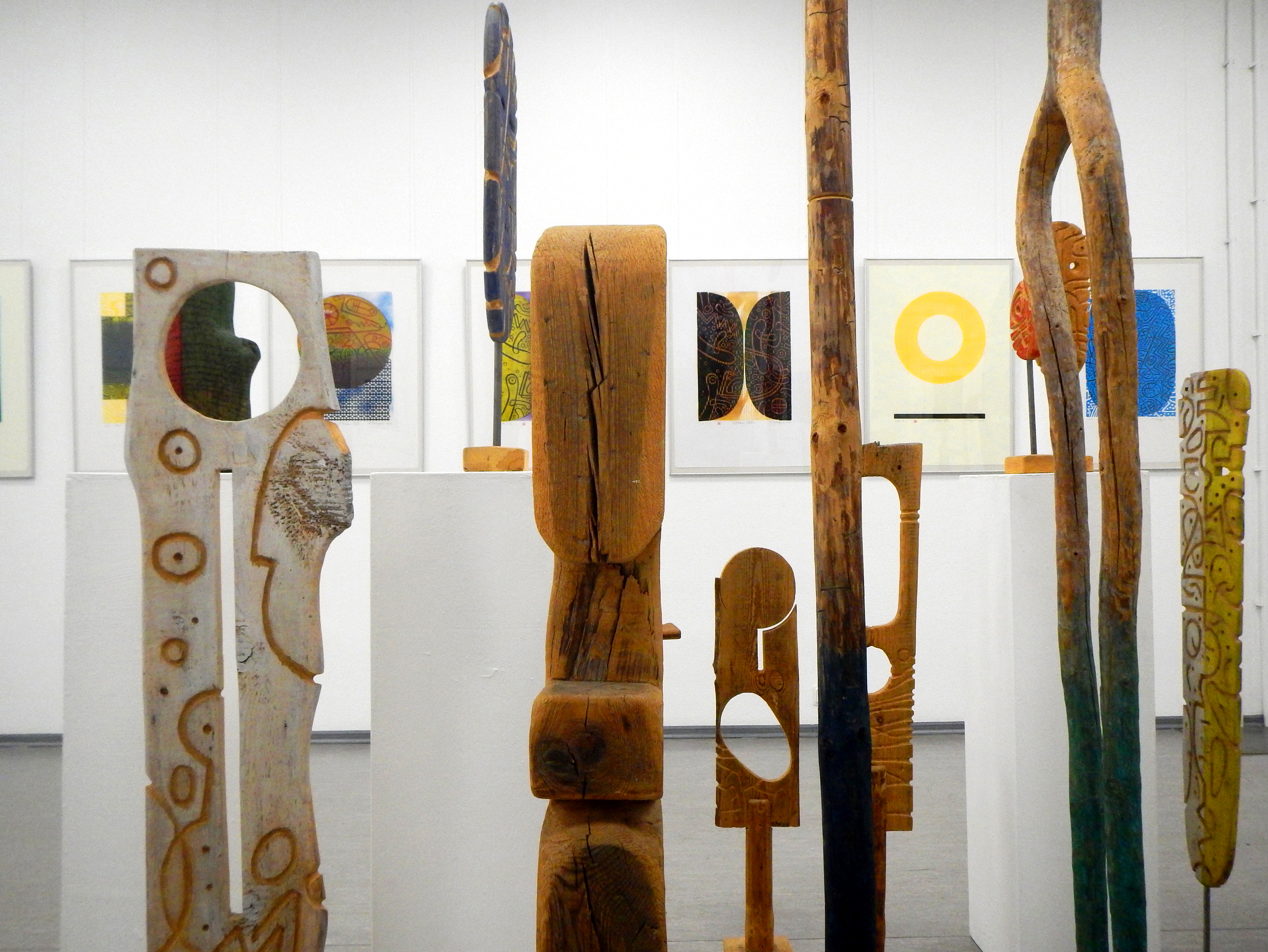
Posturbanism Back to the Future. Solo exhibition. 2023

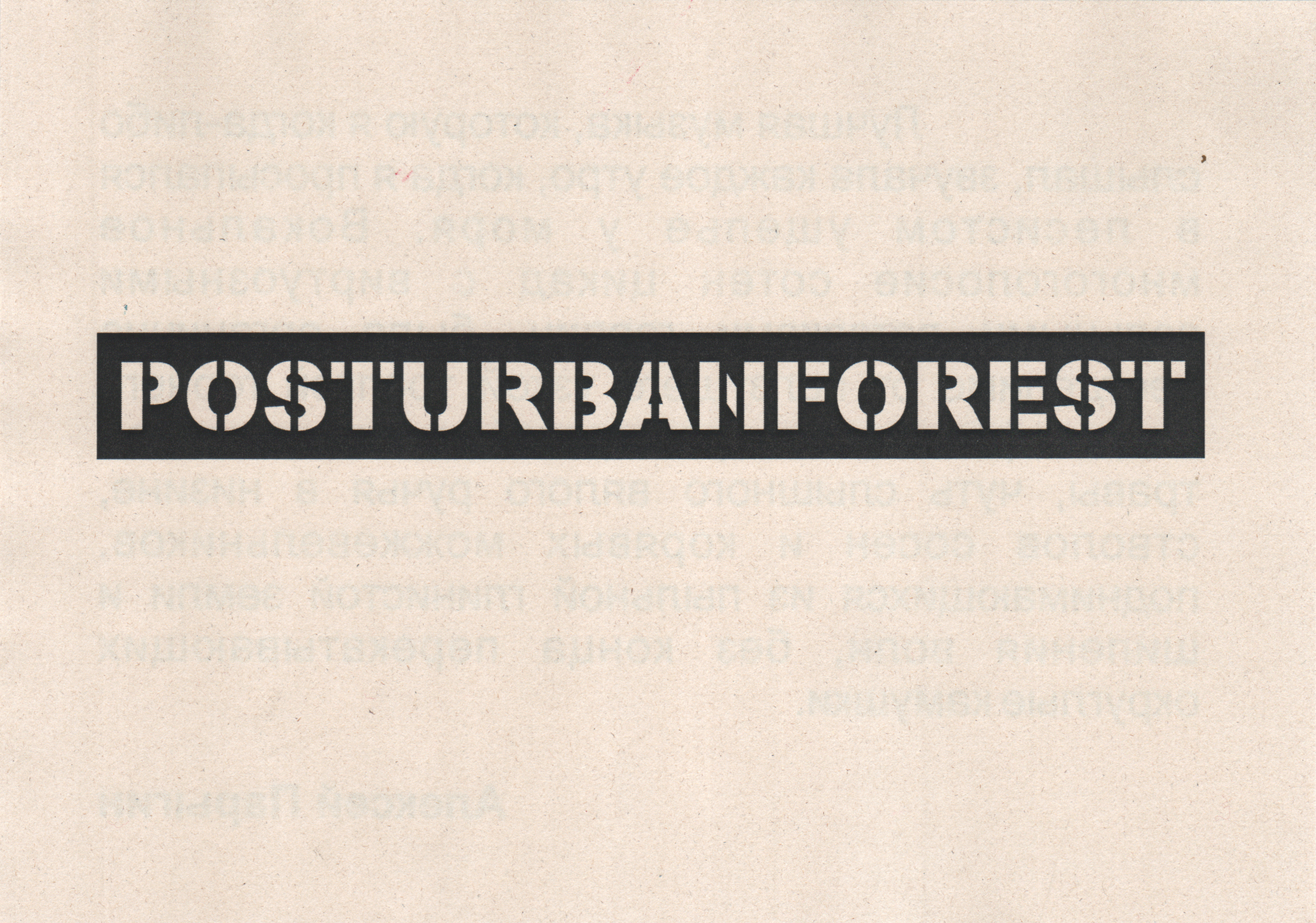
PostUrbanForest. Flyer. 2022

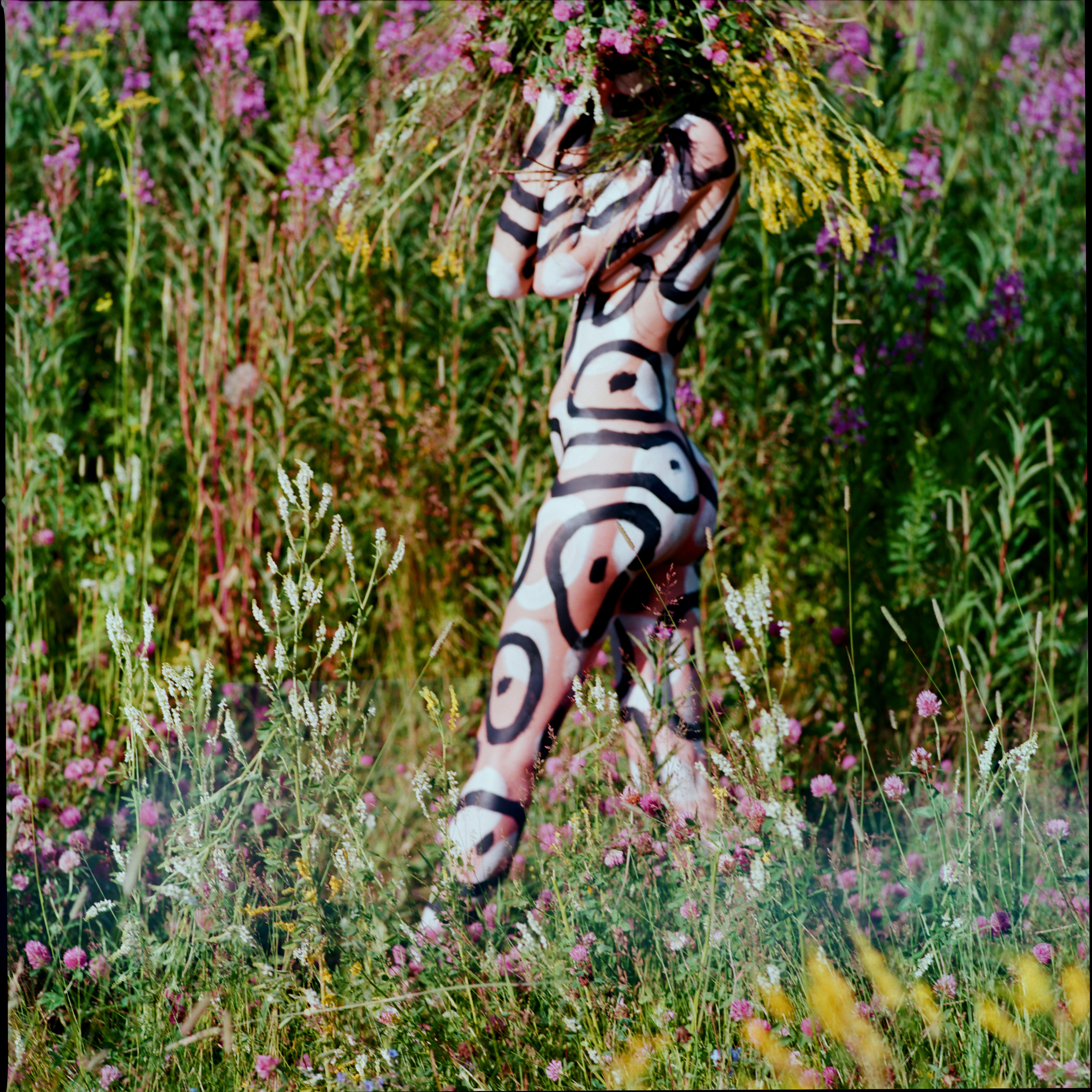
The Posturbanism Nature. Performance. Karelian Isthmus. July 26, 2017

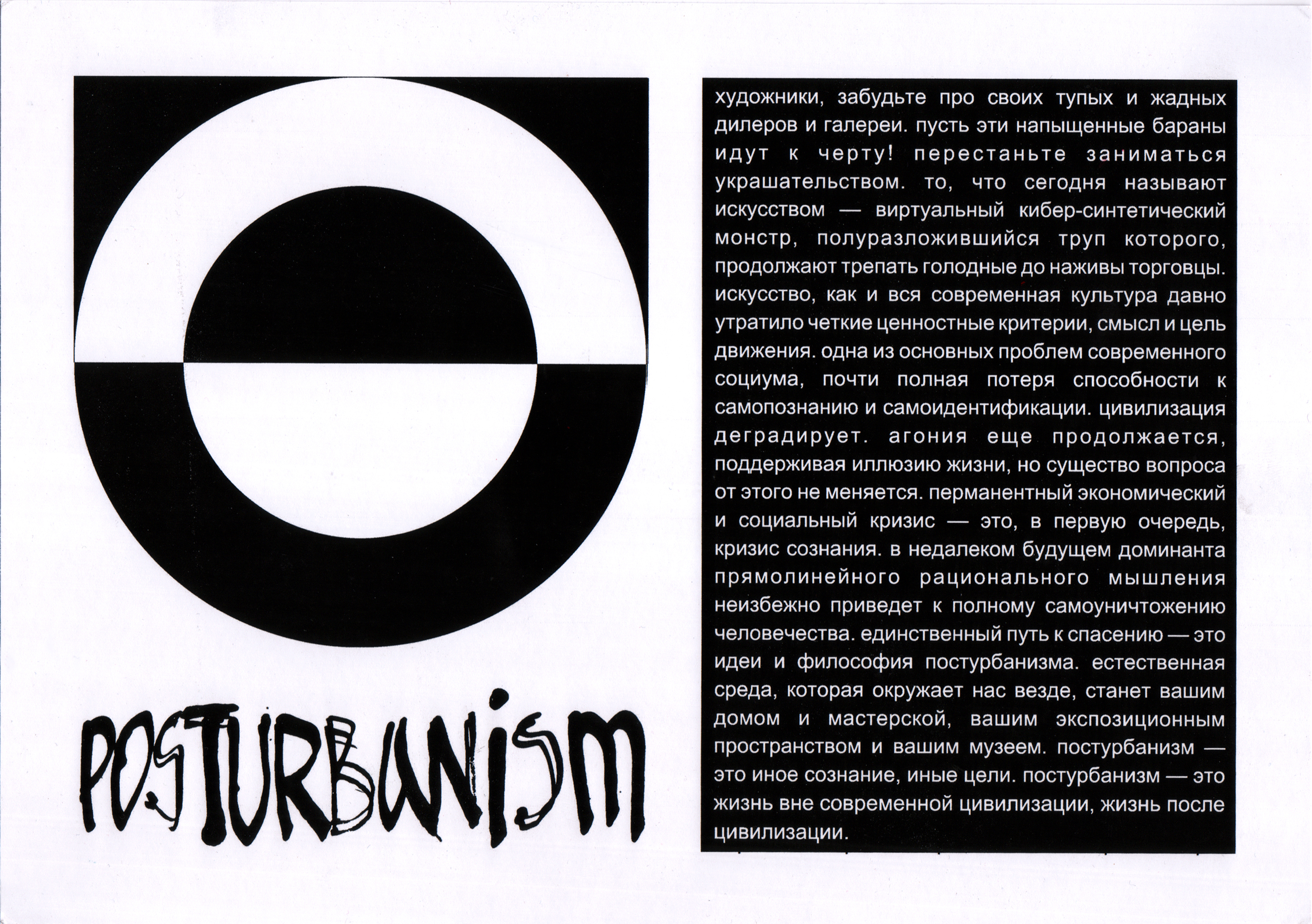
Posturbanism/ Manifesto. Flyer 2012

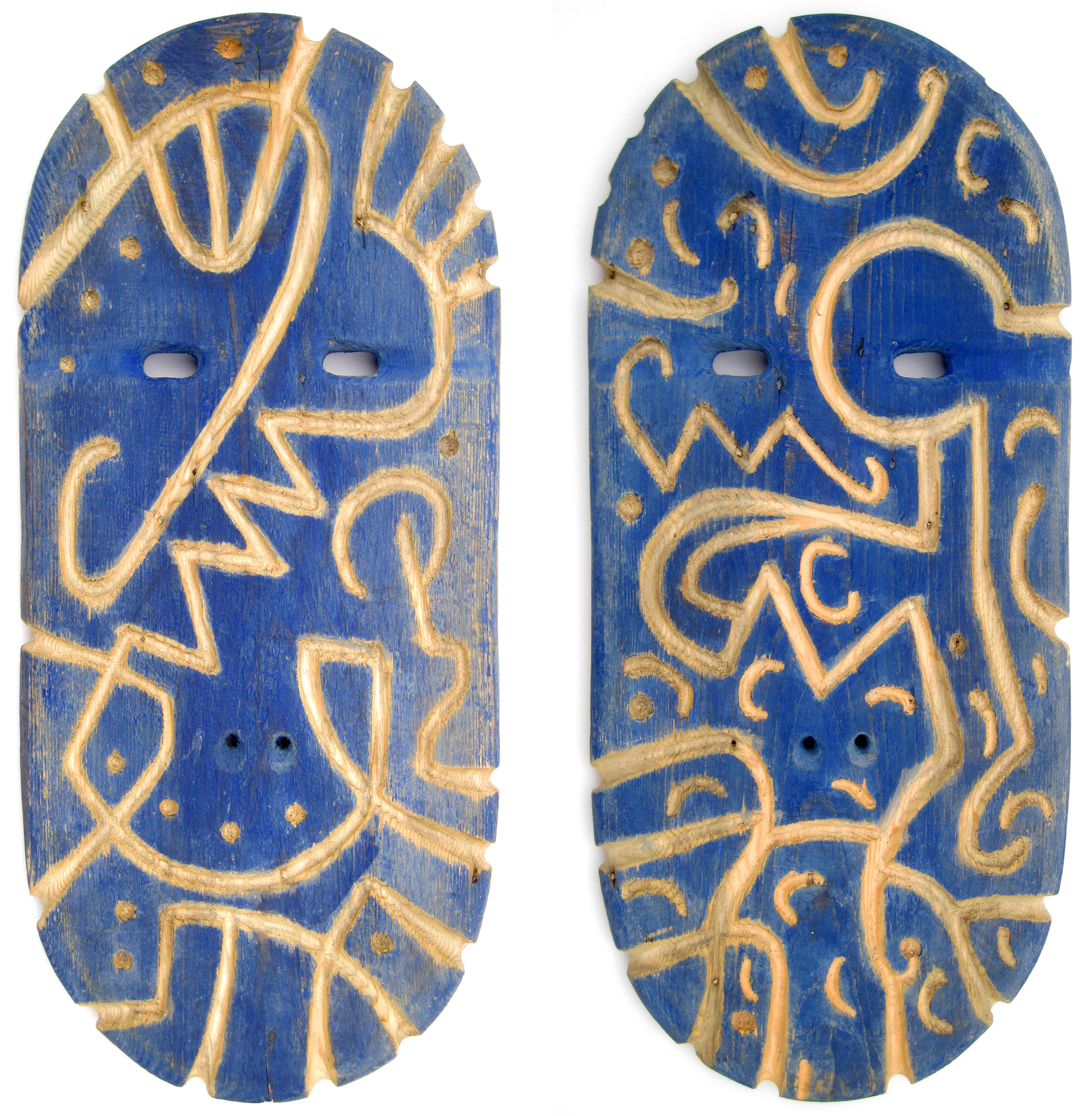
The Blue Mask. Wood, toning, engraving, 52 × 23 × 2.5 cm. 2010

- Alexey Parygin/ PostUrbanism-Northwest.—Alvar Aalto Library. Vyborg. July 1—31, 2025.
- Posturbanism: Back to the Future. Alexey Parygin. Engravings, art objects, collection.—Book Graphics Library. St. Petersburg. March 16—April 16, 2023.
- Four squared.—Museum of Nonconformist Art. Art Center Pushkinskaya 10. St. Petersburg. June 25—August 28, 2022.
- Mashkerad.—Alexander Shumov Gallery. Moscow. May 13—June 13, 2021.
- Color on paper.—The Great Hall of the Saint Petersburg Stieglitz State Academy of Art and Design. St. Petersburg. April 12—26, 2021.
- Sopromat.—Museum of the avant-garde on Shabolovka. Moscow. February 18—March 29, 2020.
- Graphics Festival-UNI Graphica 2019.—Krasnodar Regional Art Museum named after F. A. Kovalenko. Krasnodar. September 12—October 13, 2019.
- Quatrième biennale internationale de poésie visuelle d’Ille sur Tet Catalogne nord.—Ille-sur-Têt. France. June 4–16, 2019.
- Artisterium XII. Annual International Contemporary Art Exhibition and Art Events.—David Kakabadze Fine Art Gallery. Kutaisi, Tbilisi. Georgia. June 11–30, 2019.
- SPb Subjective factor. St. Petersburg: Saint Petersburg Union of Artists. January 29—February 3, 2019.
- Dualism / Third Baltic Biennale of Book Art—2018.—St. Petersburg Creative Union of Artists (IFA). St. Petersburg. December 3–14, 2018.
- Biennale New ideas for the city-VIII.—New Exhibition Hall of the State Museum of Urban Sculpture. St. Petersburg. October 15—November 28, 2018.
- „17. INTERBIFEP“ Mezinárodní bienále festivalu portrétu.—Mezinárodní portrétní galerie.Tuzla. Bosnia and Herzegovina. September 17—November 2, 2018.
- Made in Japan.—St. Petersburg Creative Union of Artists (IFA). St. Petersburg. June 14–28, 2018.
- Lines and dots.—Art Center Pushkinskaya 10, Gallery "Door". St. Petersburg.—2018.
- Personajes y otros retratos.—Galería Santa Thekl Atelier. Guatemala. July 5—August 31, 2018.
- 20th Beijing Art Expo.—China International Exhibition Center. Beijing. China. August 31—September 3, 2017.
- Posturbanism / Human.—Nevsky 20 (rotunda), St. Petersburg.—2014.
- Pro print.—Nevsky 20 (rotunda), St. Petersburg. 1—18 March 2014.
- Posturbanism / Blow-Up.—Art Center Pushkinskaya 10, Gallery "Door". St. Petersburg. January 12—February 3, 2013.
- Petersburg 2011.—Central Exhibition Hall Manege. St. Petersburg. 6—26 January 2012.
- Art in the Forest (a series of installations and performances in the natural environment).—Karelian Isthmus.—2010.

== Interview ==
- Алексей Парыгин. Постурбанизм: знаки в пространстве идей.—Interview with Elena Grigoryants // Авансцена. 2023 (11), December, No. 3, 4.—pp. 148–155. Circulation–2000 copies. ISSN 2712-7982 ISBN 978-5-907685-39-0
- Возвращение к истокам. Lana Konokotina. NTV—St. Petersburg. "Today—St. Petersburg". March 16, 2023 19:30. (Rus)
- „Россия докатилась до новой этики“: художник Парыгин назвал жалобы на „обнажёнку“ в Эрмитаже декларацией варварства. Interview with artist Alexey Parygin. Rosbalt.—2021, April 8. 19:05.
- Любой мегаполис — это всегда отчасти Вавилон. Interview with artist Alexey Parygin. Rosbalt. — 2020, October 22.
- Новые идеи для города-VIII. Interview with the curators of the exhibition—Anna Kovalevskaya and artist-curator and exhibitor—Alexey Parygin. Radio Petersburg. Transfer "Meetings in Italian St.". 2018, 25 October. Thu. 19.07-19.40.

== Public lectures ==
- ‘Posturbanism: yesterday, today, tomorrow‘. Library of book graphics. Saint Petersburg. 2023, April 1. 5-6.30 p.m. (As part of a personal exhibition).
- ‘Post Urbanism as the Concept of the Future‘. David Kakabadze Kutaisi Fine Art Gallery. Kutaisi. 2019, June 15, Saturday. 3-4 p.m. (As part of the art festival “Artisterium XII”.

== Bibliography ==
=== Articles ===
- Parygin A. B. Постурбанизм — терминологический аспект. — St. Petersburg art notebooks, # 75, St. Petersburg: AIS, 2023. — P. 175—178. ISBN 978-5-906442-40-6 (RUS)
- Severyukhin D. Ya. Постурбанизм или архаика будущего. — St. Petersburg art notebooks, # 67, St. Petersburg: AIS, 2021. — P. 63–65. ISBN 978-5-906442-31-4 (RUS)
- Parygin A. B. Постурбанизм как гипотеза. — St. Petersburg art notebooks, # 68, St. Petersburg: AIS, 2022. — P. 255–259. ISBN 978-5-906442-32-1 (RUS)
- Parygin A. B. Постурбанизм — точка невозврата. — St. Petersburg. — 2021.
- Parygin A. B., Ratkyavichyute K. Постурбанизм как неофутуризм. — St. Petersburg art notebooks, # 58, St. Petersburg: AIS, 2020. — P. 103–104. ISBN 978-5-906442-22-2 (RUS)
- Parygin A. B. Постурбанизм как концепция будущего // St. Petersburg art notebooks, # 53, St. Petersburg: AIS, 2019. — P. 236–238. (RUS)
- Paryguine А. Idée et Manifeste [Posturbanisme] // Revue Trakt — Nu. 6; Juin 2018. — Paris. — pp. 26–28. ISSN 2558-3522
- Parygin A. B. Линии и точки. Press release (flyer) for the exhibition February 24 — March 18, 2018. — St. Petersburg. — 2018. — 1 s. (RUS)
- Zamyatin D. N. Постурбанизм, сопространственность, искусство: имажинальноонтологический поворот / XI Иконниковские чтения (материалы научной конференции). 2017. — P. 114–140. (RUS)
- Grigoryants E. I. «Постурбанизм» Алексея Парыгина. — St. Petersburg art notebooks, # 34., St. Petersburg: AIS, 2015. — P. 66–69. (RUS)
- Grigoryants E. I. Искусство постурбанизма // Bulletin of St. Petersburg State University of Technology and Design. — 2015. — # 4, St. Petersburg: SPb GUTD, 2015. — P. 61–64, col. illus. (RUS)
- Parygin A. B. Постурбанизм/ Человек. Exhibition booklet. — St. Petersburg. — 2014. (RUS)
- Parygin A. B. Posturbanism / Blow-Up. Flyer for the exhibition. January 12 — February 3, 2013. — St. Petersburg: Pushkinskaya 10. — 2013. — 1 s. (RUS)
- Parygin A. B. Манифест постурбанизма (Flyer). — СПб. — 2010. — 1 s. (RUS)

=== Artist's book ===
- Alexey Parygin Posturban. Saint Petersburg, 2016.
- Alexey Parygin PostUrbanism Fire. Saint Petersburg, 2015.
- Alexey Parygin Posturbanism. Saint Petersburg, 2012.

=== Exhibition catalogues ===
- Posturbanism: Back to the Future. Alexey Parygin. Engravings, art objects, collection. Authors of the articles: Konokotina L., Kononikhin N. St. Petersburg: BKG.—2023.—24 pp.
- Imago Mundi/ Beyond the Black square. Contemporary Artists from St. Petersburg. Texts: Luciano Benetton, Liliana Malta, Gleb Ershov.—Treviso: Antiga Edizioni, 2021.—480 pp.—P. 308–309. (English, Russian, Italian) ISBN 978-88-8435-135-7
- Сопромат/ Group project album. Auth. Comp.: Mathyssen K. Moscow; N. Novgorod: Express.—2021.—128 p. pp. 48–49, 74.
- City as Artist's subjectivity. Artist's book project. Catalog. Authors of the articles: Parygin A.B., Markov T.A., Klimova E.D., Borovsky A.D., Severyukhin D.Ya., Grigoryants El., Blagodatov N.I. (Rus & En)—SPb: T. Markov Publishing house. 2020.—128 pp. ISBN 978-5-906281-32-6
- Artisterium XII. Artisterium On the Road / Catalog (7 notebooks in the cover). Tbilisi: Artisterium.—2019.
- Nuire No. 5. Quatrième biennale internationale de poésie visuelle d’Ille sur Tet Catalogne nord / Catalog. Ille-sur-Têt.— 2019.—95 pp. P. 82.
- 5ª Bienal Internacional de Gravura «Lívio Abramo» / Catalog. Araraquara/SP.—2019.—23 pp.
- СПб Субъективный фактор / Catalog. Auth. int. Art.: A. Dolgushin. SPb.—2019.—133 pp., ill. pp. 102–103.
- Third International Printmaking Biennial in Cacak / Catalog. Čačak.—2018.—105 pp., ill. P. 26.
- «17. INTERBIFEP» Mezinárodní bienále festivalu portrétu / Catalog. Tuzla: Mezinárodní portrétní galerie Tuzla.—2018.—186 pp. P. 130.
- Новые идеи для города—VIII / Exhibition catalogue. Auth. int. Art.: A. A. Kovalevskaya. St. Petersburg: GMGS, 2018.—56 pp., col. ill. P. 30.
- Дуализм. Third Baltic Book Art Biennale / Exhibition catalogue. Auth. int. Art.: I. Grinchel, Parygin A.B., Grigoryants El. St. Petersburg, 2018.—100 pp., color. ill.
- Книжное пламя / Book fire / International Project of the Miniature Artist's Book / Exhibition Catalogue. Auth. int. Art.: M. Pogarsky. Moscow: Cherry Pie.— 015.—116 pp., col. ill. P. 102.
- Про принт / Exhibition catalogue. Auth. int. Art.: V. Borisov. SPb.—2014.—24 pp., color. ill. pp. 16–17.

== Works ==
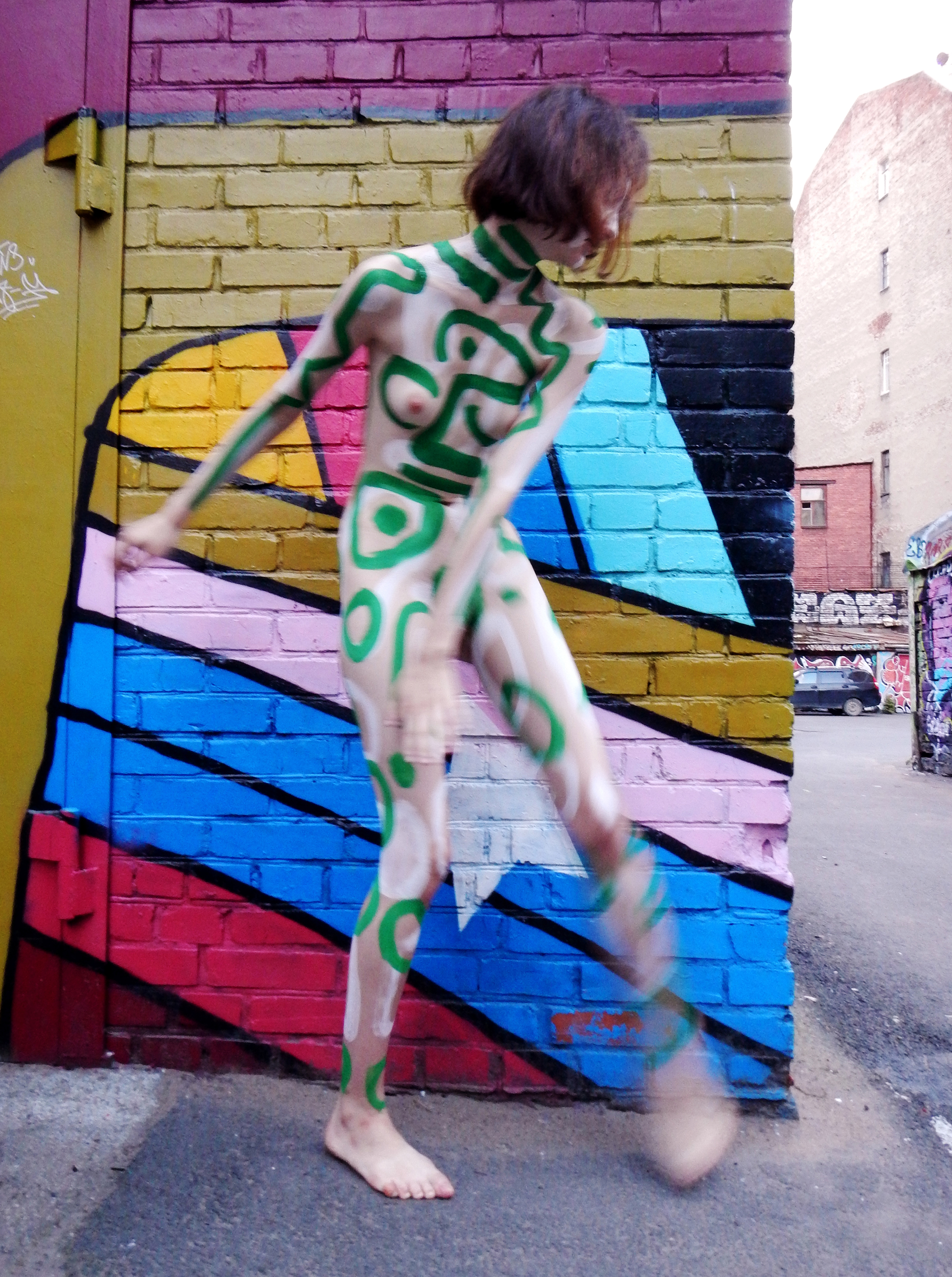

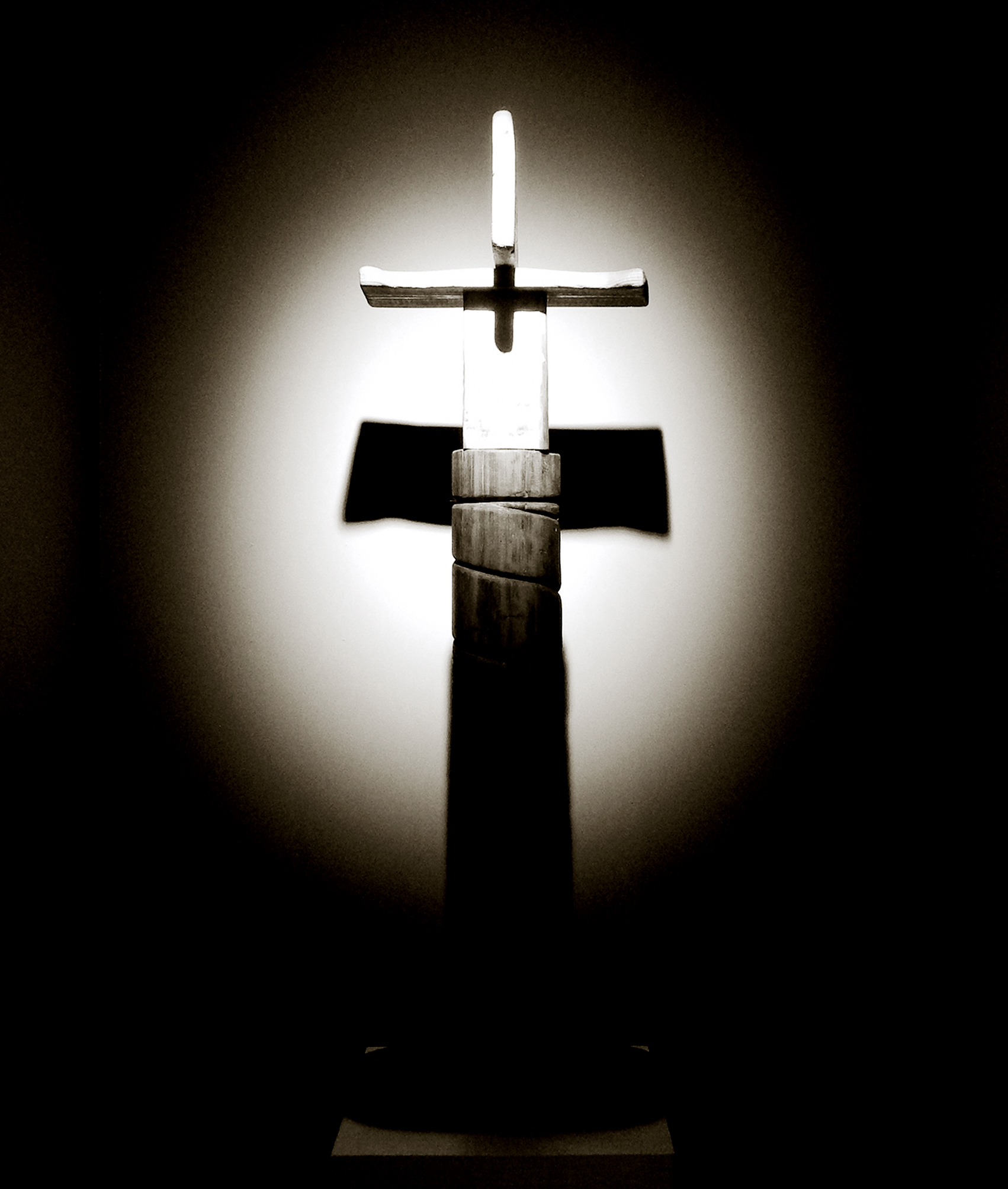

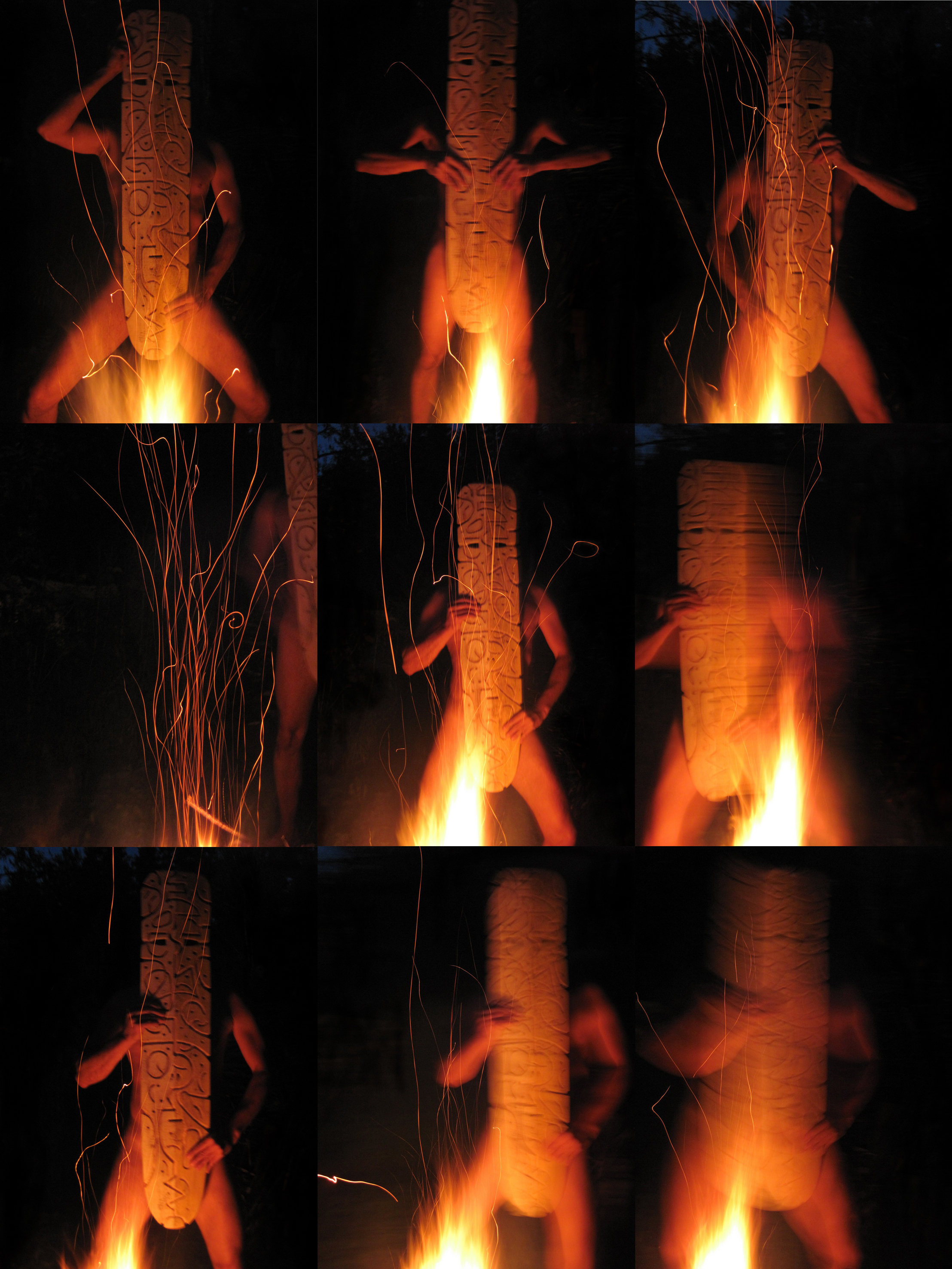

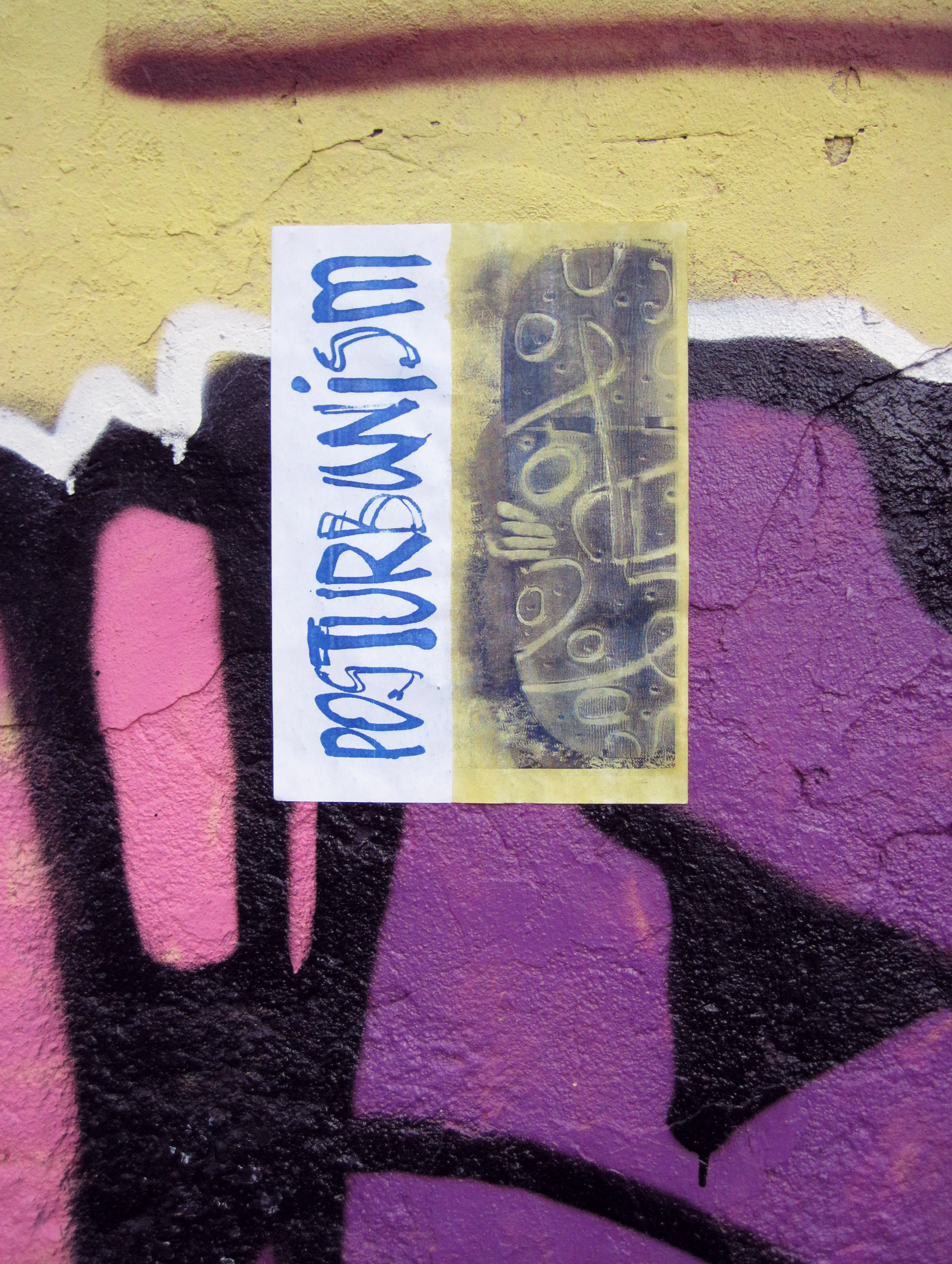

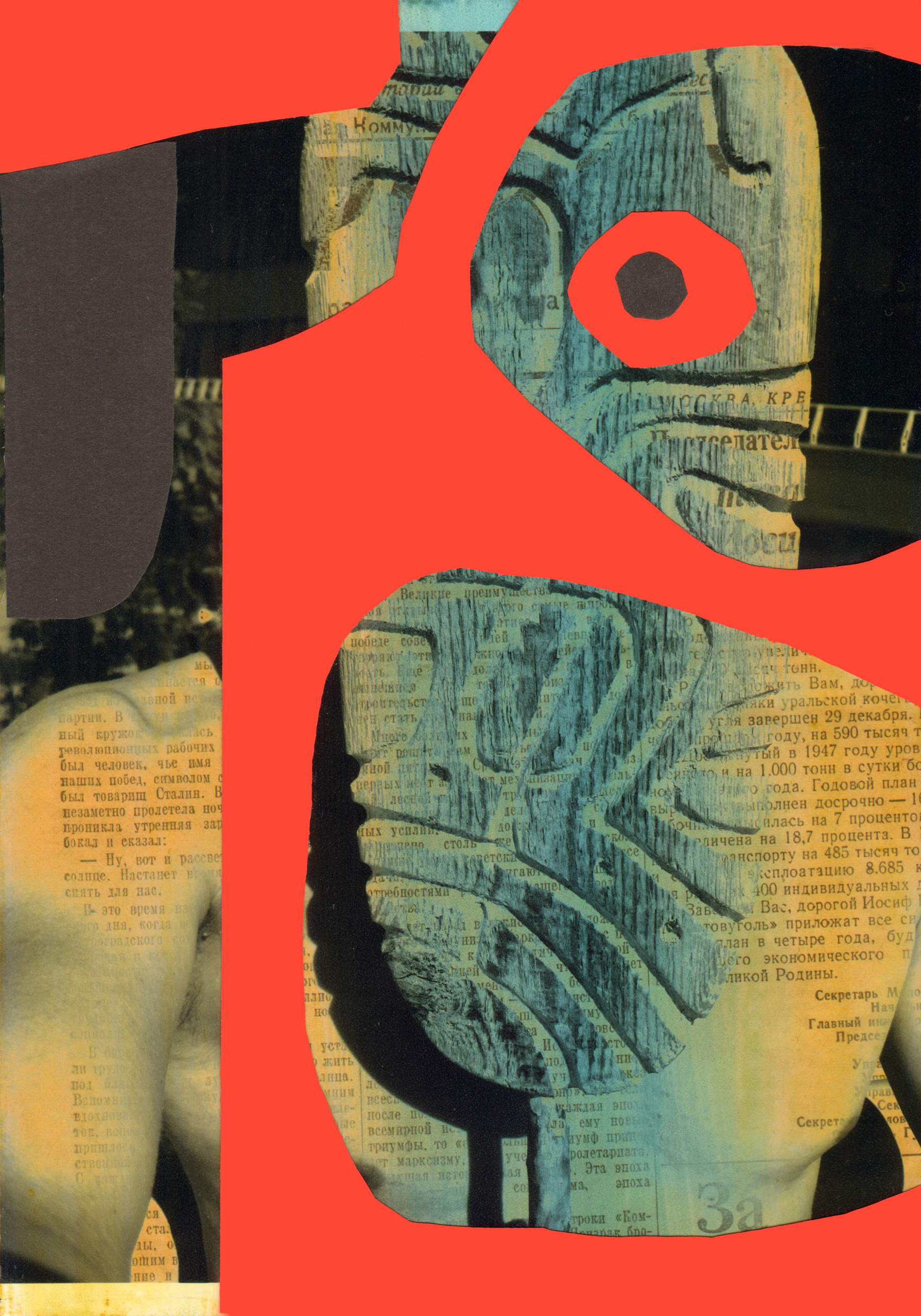
