= Contemplation of Money =

Art project by Alexey Parygin

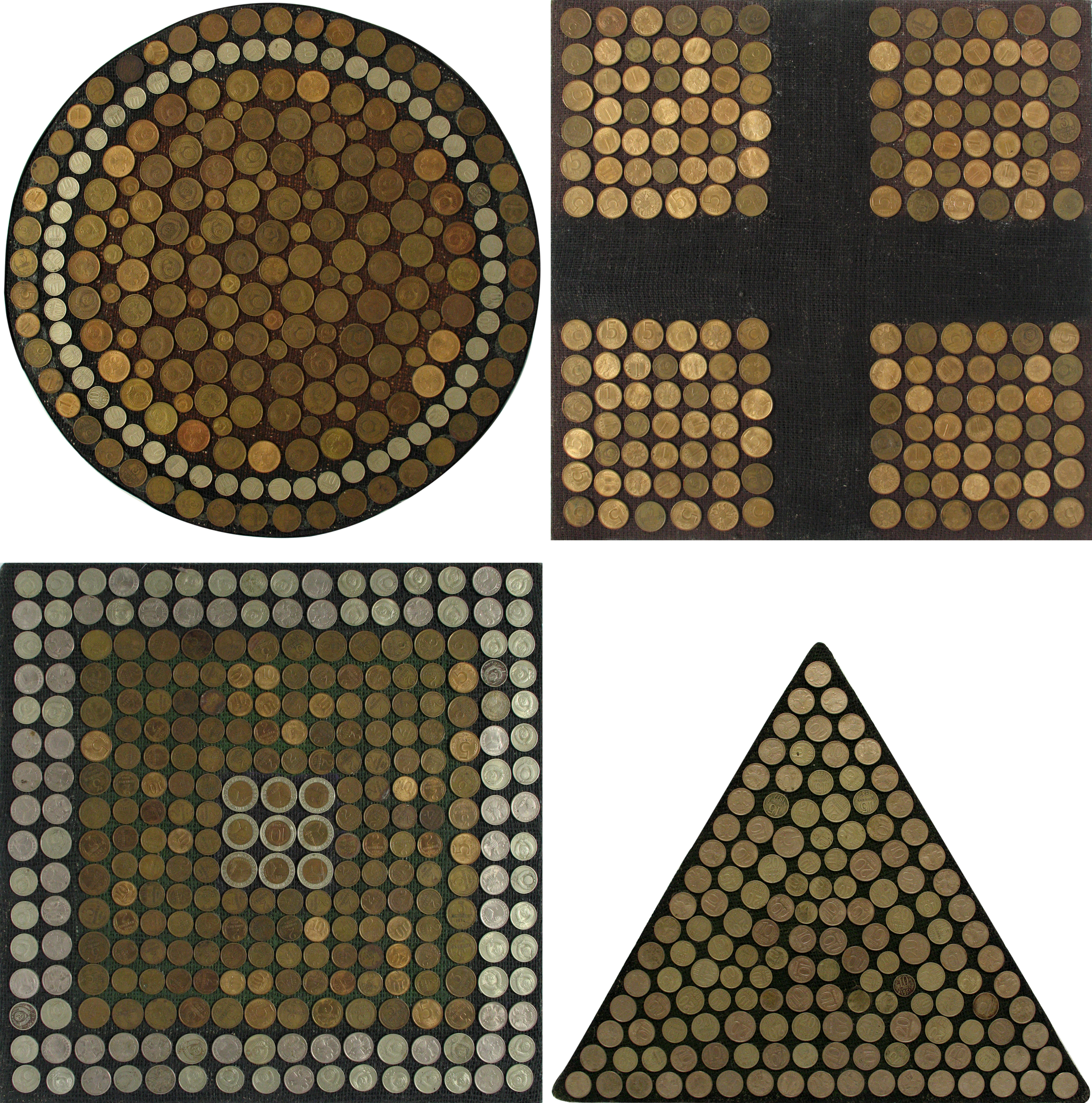
- Artist: Alexey Parygin
- Year: 1996–2000
- Medium: mixed media
- Location: St. Petersburg

Contemplation of Money (Russian: Созерца́ние де́нег, romanized: Sozertsániye déneg) is an conceptual project by the artist Alexey Parygin, realized in the second half of the 1990s, the main semantic element of which were banknotes. The basis is a group of art objects created using the coins and bills of the Bank of Russia, which were in circulation at the time.

== History ==
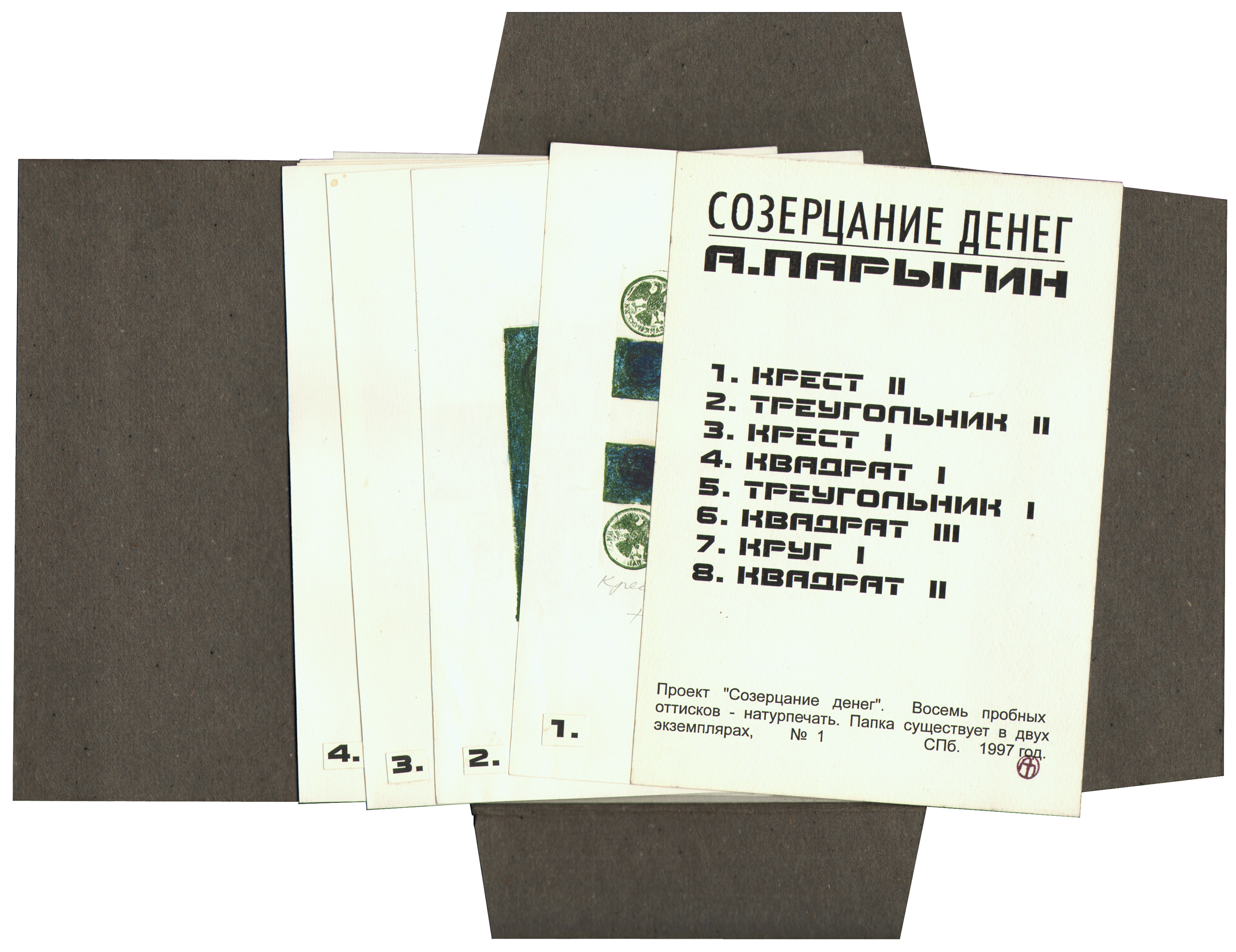
Contemplation of Money. Artist's book. 1997

The specific mass of money was steadily increasing and depreciating. Square, circle, and triangle, the simple geometric shapes chosen as the matrix for mounting the collages, were programmatically predictable and non-alternative, like ideal meditative figures. The objects were conceived as self-sufficient parts of modular structures with the possibility of variable combination on display, depending on the specific exposition task.

The association with the icon of the Russian avant-garde—Kazimir Malevich's triptych (Black Square, Black Cross, Black Circle) became a conscious component of the project. It is the same with the form of Byzantine art and old Russian icons. In this case, the plastic solution of the series of artworks is not perceived as a literal quotation or borrowing.

Contemplation of Money is an ironic homage to the Black Square, which became one of the turning points in the 20th century art history and almost immediately turned into a speculative idea and manifesto on itself. A clear signpost to indicate the conceptual vector of the project more accurately.

By means of art, the Contemplation of Money and Art is a Business projects portrayed money as a New Divine Essence.

In 2006, psychologist Kathleen Vohs conducted a series of experiments on the effects of money on human consciousness. It has been proven that the contemplation of money helps to increase confidence in one's rightness and gives optimism.

Contemplation of Money is the artist's first philosophical manifesto, which was developed in subsequent artworks: Art is a Business (2000–2015), Art in the Forest (2000–2005), Posturbanism Art Project (since 2005), City as an Artist's Subjectivity (2019–2020).

== Major work ==
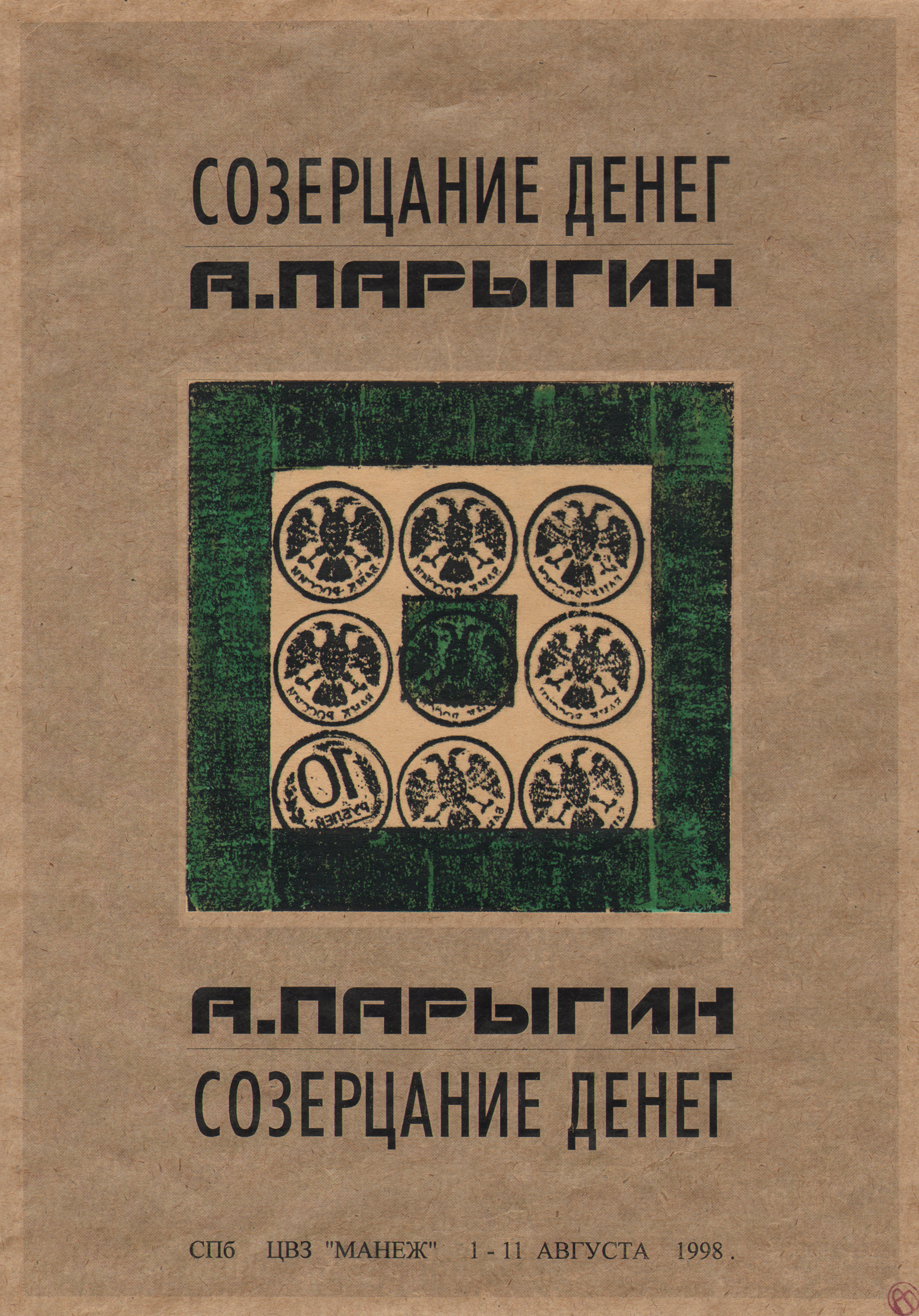
Contemplation of Money. Poster. 1998

=== Art Objects ===
- Contemplation of money (1997, burlap on a stretcher, banknotes, 1000 × 1000 × 25 mm).
- Sign—Square I (1997, burlap on a stretcher, coins, 383 × 383 × 25 mm).
- Sign—Square II (1997, burlap on a stretcher, coins, 383 × 383 × 25 mm).
- Sign—Cross (1997, burlap on a stretcher, coins, 383 × 383 × 25 mm).
- Sign—Circle (1997, burlap on a stretcher, coins, Ø 400 × 25 mm).
- Sign—Triangle (1997, burlap on a stretcher, coins, 430 × 430 × 420 × 25 mm).
- Sign—Big Square (1997, burlap on a stretcher, coins, 585 × 585 × 15 mm).
- Sign—Large Circle (1997, burlap on a stretcher, coins, Ø 585 × 15 mm).
- Sign—Big Triangle (1997, burlap on a stretcher, coins, 670 × 670 × 645 × 15 mm).
- Sign—Blue Square (1997, burlap on a stretcher, banknotes, 435 × 430 × 25 mm).
- Sign—White Cross (1997, burlap on a stretcher, banknotes, 430 × 430 × 25 mm).
- Sign—Yellow Triangle (1997, burlap on a stretcher, banknotes, 430 × 430 × 25 mm).
- Sign—Green Circle (1997, burlap on a stretcher, banknotes, 435 × 430 × 25 mm).
- Pyramid XO (1998, burlap, coins, H 300, 280 × 280 mm).

=== Artist's book ===
- Parygin A. Contemplation of Money. St. Petersburg, 1999. 21 pp.
- Parygin A. Contemplation of Money (nine sheets in a folder). St. Petersburg, 1997.

== Exhibitions ==
- The Artist's Book in Russia and the UK. Tsaritsyno Palace. Moscow. March 13—May 18, 2014; Radishchev Art Museum. August 7—September 30, 2014.
- XXVII International Congress of Ex-Libris. Central Exhibition Hall Manege. St. Petersburg. August 22–25, 1998.
- 2nd International Festival of Experimental Arts and Performance. Central Exhibition Hall Manege. St. Petersburg. August 1–11, 1998.
- Petersburg 97. Central Exhibition Hall Manege. St. Petersburg. January 9—31, 1998.

== Bibliography ==
=== Articles ===
- Parygin A. B. Деньги как искусство // Economics vs Art: 10th Annual International Conference of the Center for the Study of Economic Culture of St Petersburg State University. St. Petersburg: Asterion, 2022. 92 pp. P. 48–49. ISBN 978-5-00188-185-8 (RUS)
- Parygin A. B. Созерцание денег (авторский комментарий к проекту). St. Petersburg art notebooks, # 68, St. Petersburg: AIS, 2022. P. 260–265. ISBN 978-5-906442-32-1 (RUS)
- Parygin A. B. Искусство — это бизнес (авторский комментарий к проекту). St. Petersburg art notebooks, # 68, St. Petersburg: AIS, 2022. P. 248–254. ISBN 978-5-906442-32-1 (RUS)
- Grigoryants E. I. «Книга художника»: традиции и новации // «Искусство печатной графики: история и современность». В сб. н. статей по материалам научной конференции Четвертые казанские искусствоведческие чтения. November 19–20, 2015. Kazan: The State Museum of Fine Arts of the Republic of Tatarstan, 2015. P. 83–86, ill. (RUS)
- Blagodatov N. Art is a search, search is an art // Neva, No. 2, 2002. P. 253–255. (RUS)

=== Exhibition catalogues ===
- Книга Художника / Artists Book. Россия / United Kingdom (Catalogue of International Exhibition in the Tsaritsyno Palace). Auth. introductory article: O. Dokuchaeva, M. Pogarsky. Moscow, 2014. 64 pp., col. illus. (RUS)
- Петербург 97 (exhibition catalog). Auth. introductory article: L. Skobkina. St. Petersburg: Central Exhibition Hall Manege, 1998, illus.
- II-й Международный фестиваль экспериментальных искусств и перформанса (exhibition catalog). Auth. introductory article: L. Skobkina. St. Petersburg: Central Exhibition Hall Manege, 1998. 63 pp., illus. (RUS)
- Созерцание денег. Alexey Parygin Catalog. Auth. introductory article: Grigoryants E. I., St. Petersburg, 1998. (RUS)
