= Bellman (surname) =

Bellman is a surname. A variant of the surname is Belman. Notable people with the surname include:

- Carl Michael Bellman (1740–1795), Swedish poet and composer
- Dmitriy Bellman (born 1977), Russian artist jeweller
- Gina Bellman (born 1966), New Zealand/English actress
- Heiko Bellmann (1950–2014) German biologist, writer, zoologist and photographer
- Henrik Bellman (born 1999), Swedish footballer
- Brigadier John Bellman MC (1920-1998), British Army Officer, ADC to Queen Elizabeth II.
- Jonathan Bellman (born 1957), American musicologist
- John Belleman (died after 1557), Tutor to Edward VI
- Lois Bellman (1926–2015), All-American Girls Professional Baseball League player
- Richard E. Bellman (1920–1984), American mathematician
- Samuel H. Bellman (1906–1999), American lawyer and politician
- Veronika Bellmann (born 1960), German politician

Fictional characters:

- Beatrice Bellman, a character played by Maureen Lipman in BT commercials
