= Billman (disambiguation) =

Billman may refer to:

- Billman, person who uses a bill (weapon)
- Billman (surname)
- Billman Creek Formation, geologic formation
