= Bellman =

Bellman may refer to:

- Town crier, an officer of the court who makes public pronouncements
- Bellhop, a hotel porter
- Bellman (surname)
- Bellman (diving), a standby diver and diver's attendant
- Bellman hangar, a prefabricated, portable aircraft hangar
- Bellman's Head, a headland point in Stonehaven Bay, Scotland

== Arts ==
- The Bellman (film), a 1945 French drama film
- The Bellman (literary magazine), a 1906–1919 American periodical
- The Bellman (character), a character in the Thursday Next novels
- "Bellman", a character in Lewis Carroll's poem The Hunting of the Snark
- Bellman Prize, a literature prize awarded by the Swedish Academy
- Bellman joke, a type of Swedish joke
- Zvončari, a Croatian folk custom

== Sciences ==
- Bellman equation, a condition for optimality in dynamic programming
- Hamilton–Jacobi–Bellman equation, a condition for optimality of a control with respect to a loss function
- Bellman–Ford algorithm, a method for finding shortest paths

== See also ==
- Belman (disambiguation)
