= Art is a Business =

Art project by Alexey Parygin

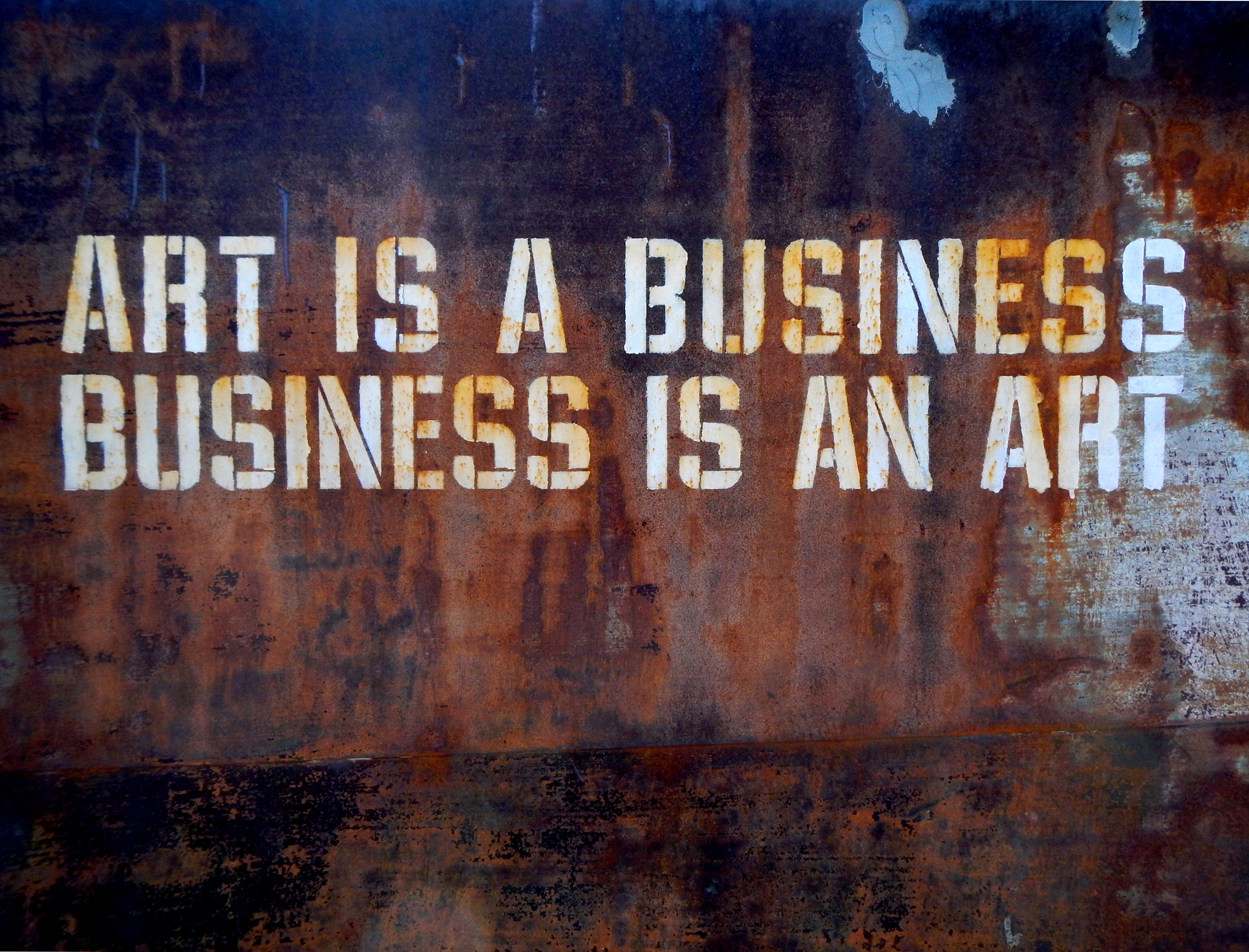
- Artist: Alexey Parygin
- Year: 2000-2016
- Medium: mixed media
- Location: Saint Petersburg

Art is a Business (Russian: Иску́сство — это́ би́знес, romanized: Iskússtvo—etó bíznes) is a conceptual project by the artist Alexey Parygin, realized in the first half of the 2000s. Art is a Business is the artist’s second philosophical manifesto, after Contemplation of Money.

== History ==
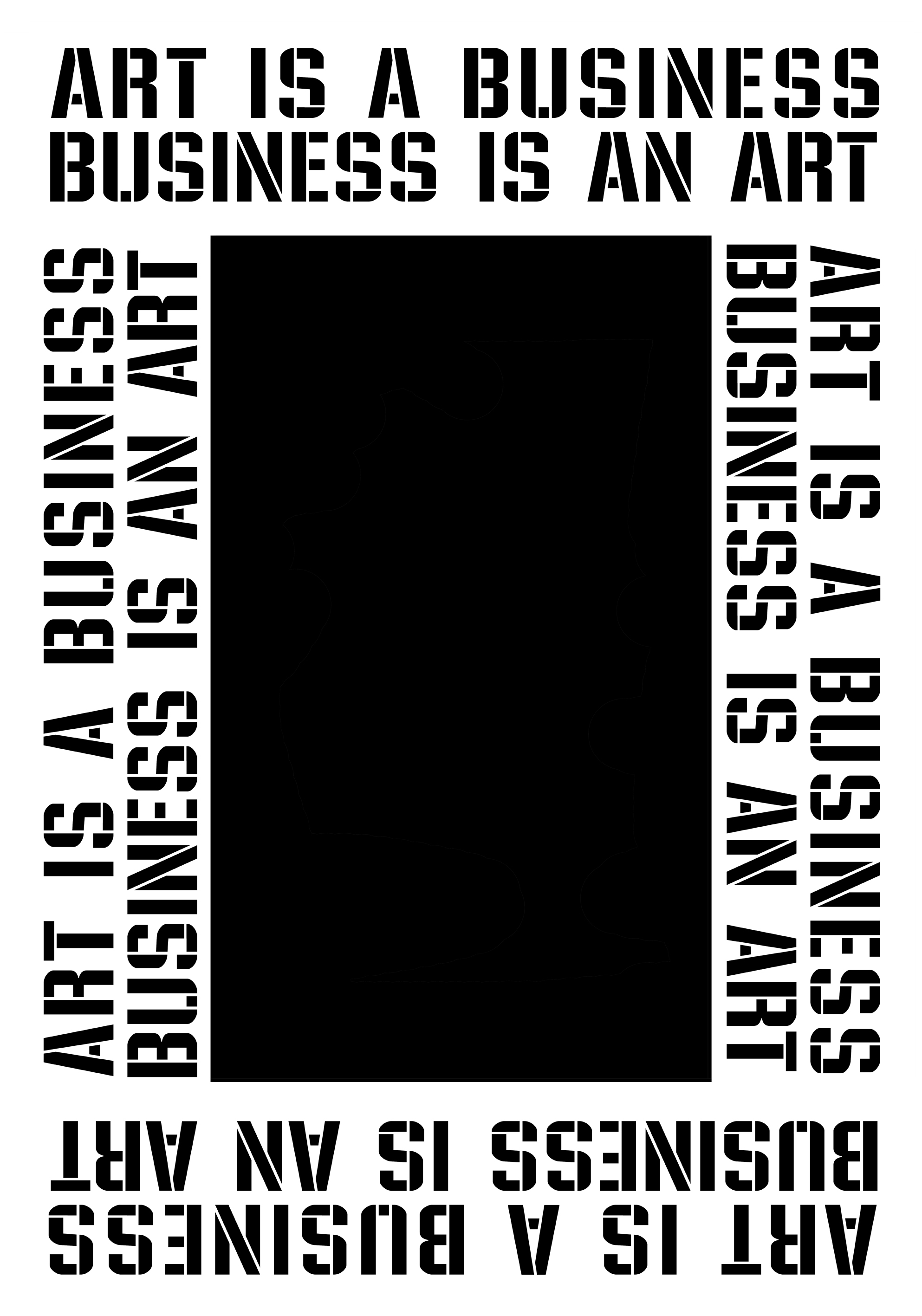
Art is a Business / Business is an Art Poster. 2016

The art project was based on the 312/20 performance publicly shown on January 21, 2001 in the performance program at the Petersburg Festival in the Manege Central Exhibition Hall (Saint Petersburg).

In the authentic version, the performance text chanted for twenty minutes in two voices (high female and low male) consisted of three hundred and twelve rhythmically repeating verses turning into a looped Dadaist mantra.

The process was designed like that: my performance partner and I were standing opposite each other at a distance of about three meters. While reading the text, with arms straight up and slightly apart (palms outward), we gradually raised our arms in a stylized gesture of a traditional intercessory prayer iconographically referring to the classical image of the Virgin Hodegetria. The incense was burning. A whitish trickle of sweet smoke was slowly stretching towards the ceiling, emphasizing the sacredness of the two-voiced hosanna repeated over and over again: Art is a Business; Business is an Art. Art is a Business; Business is an Art. Art is a Business; Business is an Art; Art is a Business; Business is an Art.... A rhythmic, monotonous sound.

This endless repetition made the reasonable formula meaningless, gradually turning it into a simple sequence of sounds, depriving it of any specific speculative sense. The verbal leitmotif changed the performance direction initially stated as an absolute given. Slogan and march were replaced with psychedelic rap. Art is business, but becoming utilitarian and flat, commercial and applicable, it, like a phoenix destroying itself with fire, is able to rise from the ashes, melt down and be reborn into something completely different, filled with new living energy.

By means of art, the Contemplation of Money and Art is a Business projects portrayed money as a New Divine Essence.

== Major work ==
- Art is a Business/ Business ist Kunst. 2015, Five compositions, 150 X 120 cm (each), canvas on stretcher, acrylic, mixed media.
- 312/20 Performance. 2001.

== Works ==
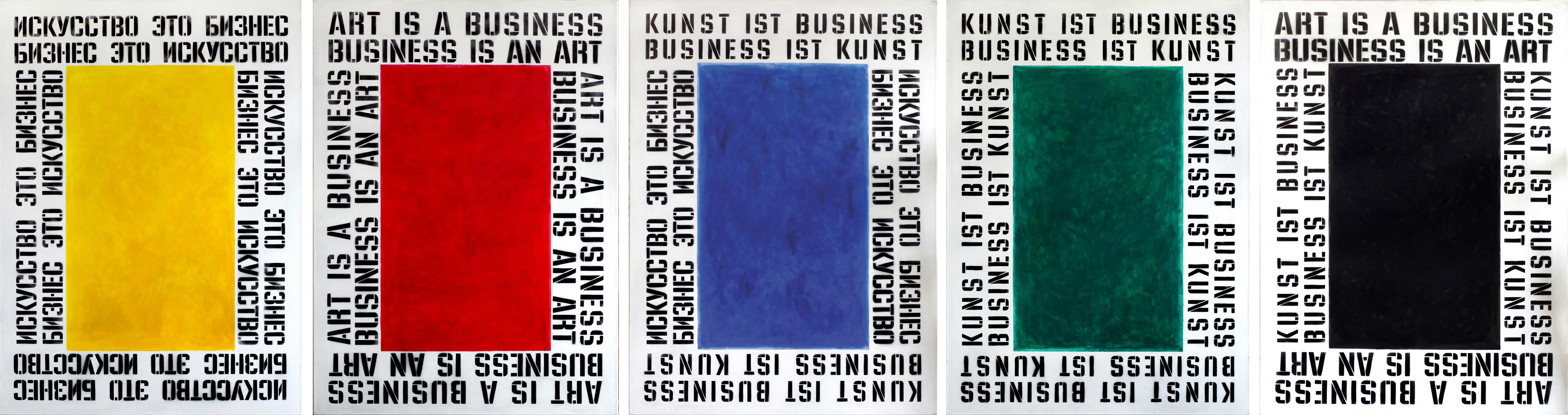

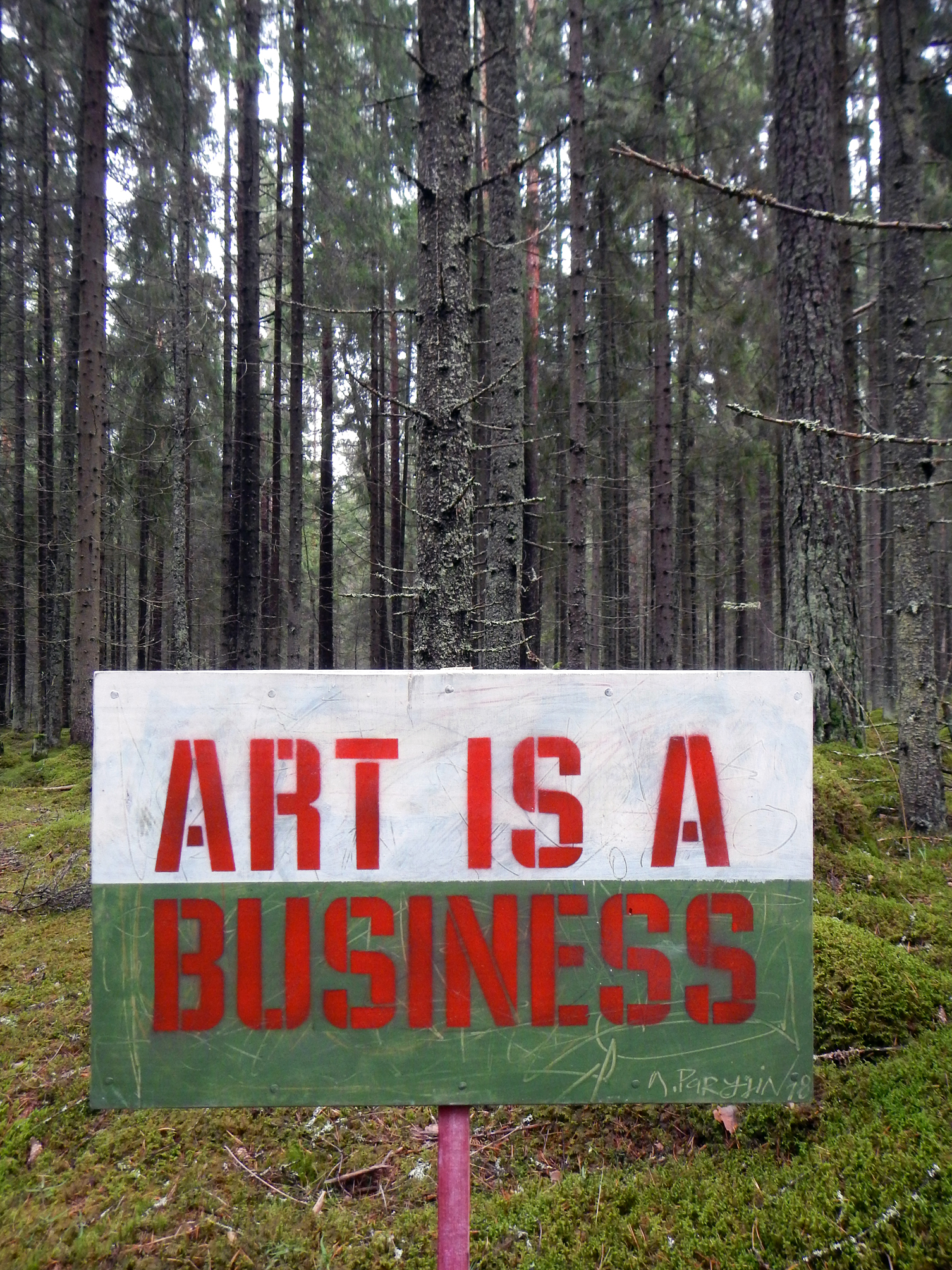

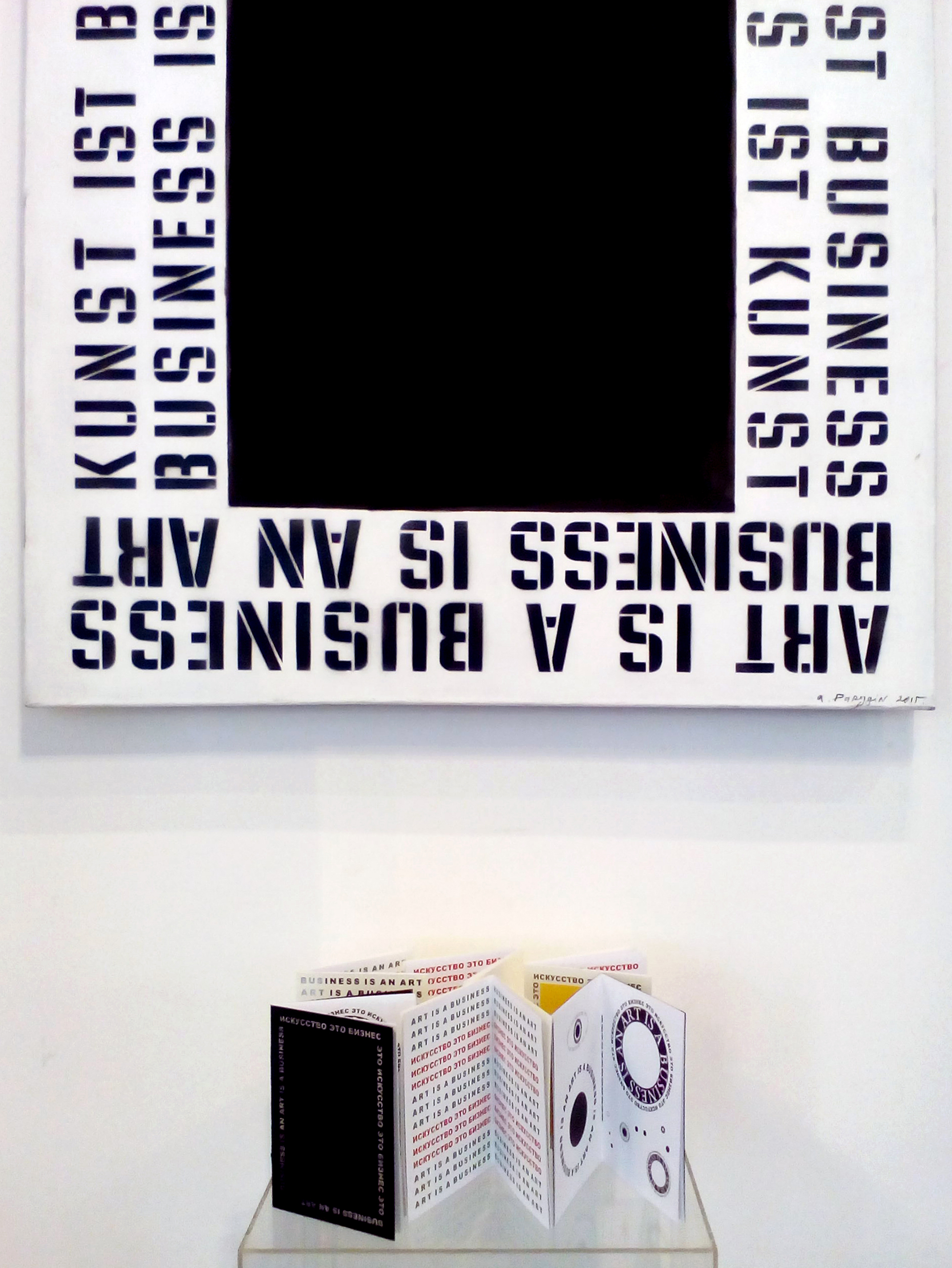

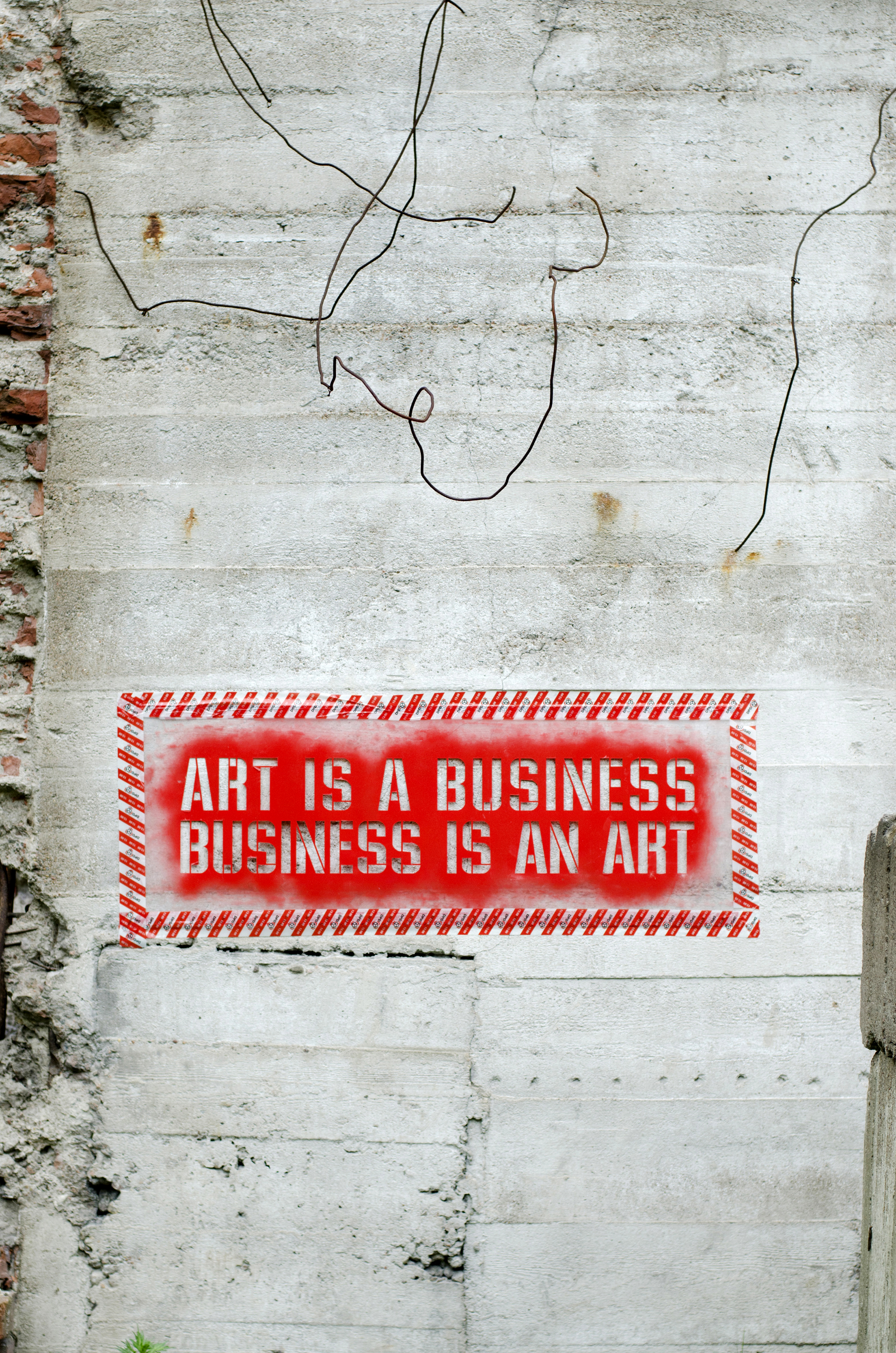

=== Artist's book ===
- Alexey Parygin Solar System Art.—St. Petersburg, 2015.— 2 pp. Circulation—8 copies numbered and signed by the author.
- Alexey Parygin Искусство это Бизнес / Business is an Art.—St. Petersburg, 2015.—12 pp. Circulation—6 copies numbered and signed by the author.
- Alexey Parygin ИББИ.—St. Petersburg, 2015.—12 pp. Circulation—6 copies numbered and signed by the author.
- Alexey Parygin Искусство это бизнес. Бизнес это искусство.—St. Petersburg, 2001.—6 pp. Circulation — 50 copies numbered and signed by the author.
- Alexey Parygin 312/20 (Искусство это бизнес. Бизнес это искусство).—St. Petersburg, 2000.—12 pp. Circulation—25 copies numbered and signed by the author.

Separate copies of the artists' books are in the following collections: Van Abbemuseum (Eindhoven), State Museum of V.V. Mayakovsky (Moscow), Russian State Library (Moscow), Russian State Art Library (Moscow), Latvian National Museum of Art (Riga), Anna Akhmatova Literary and Memorial Museum (Saint Petersburg), Scientific Library of the Russian Academy of Arts (Saint Petersburg), Artist's Book Museum (Moscow).

== Books ==
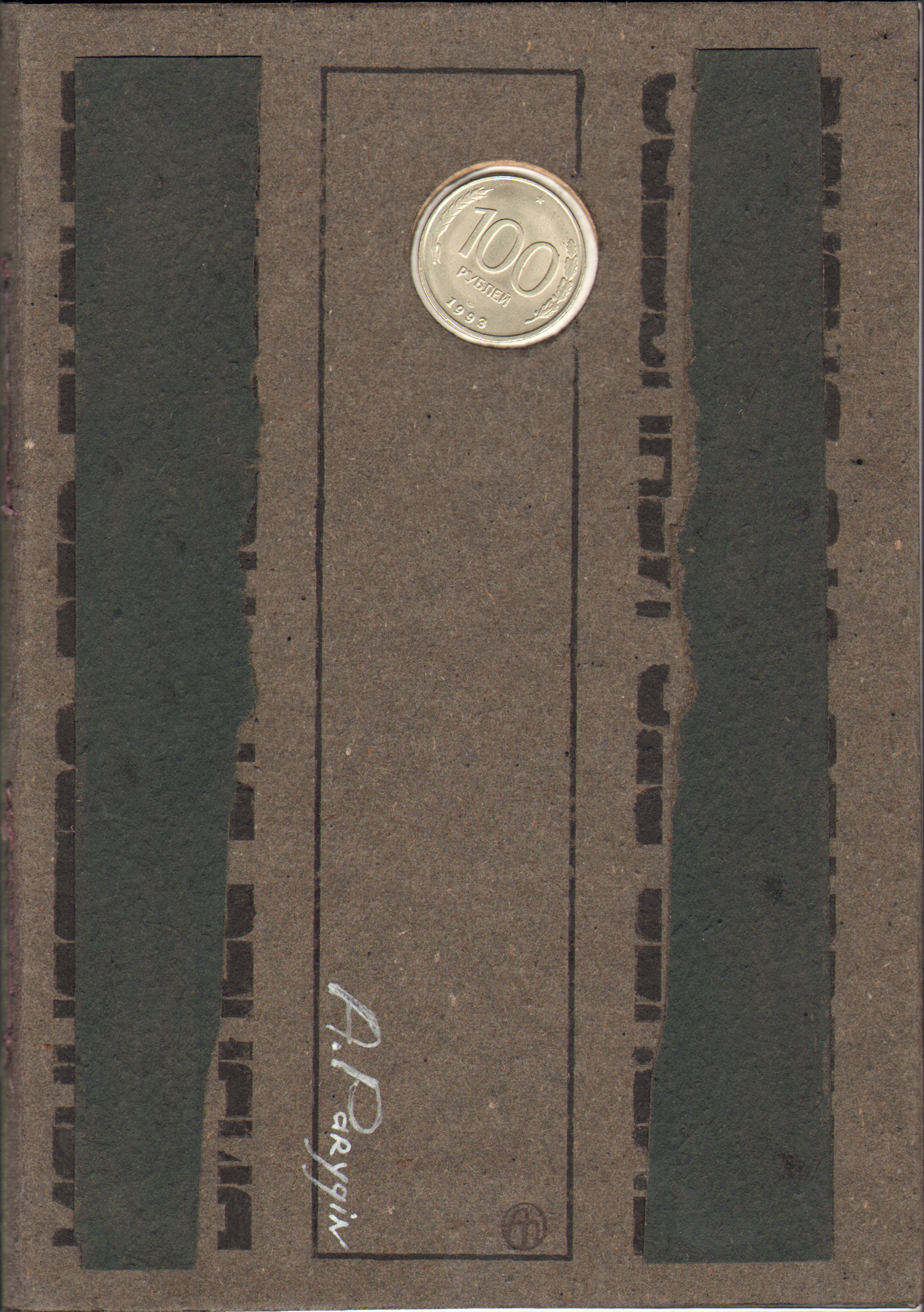

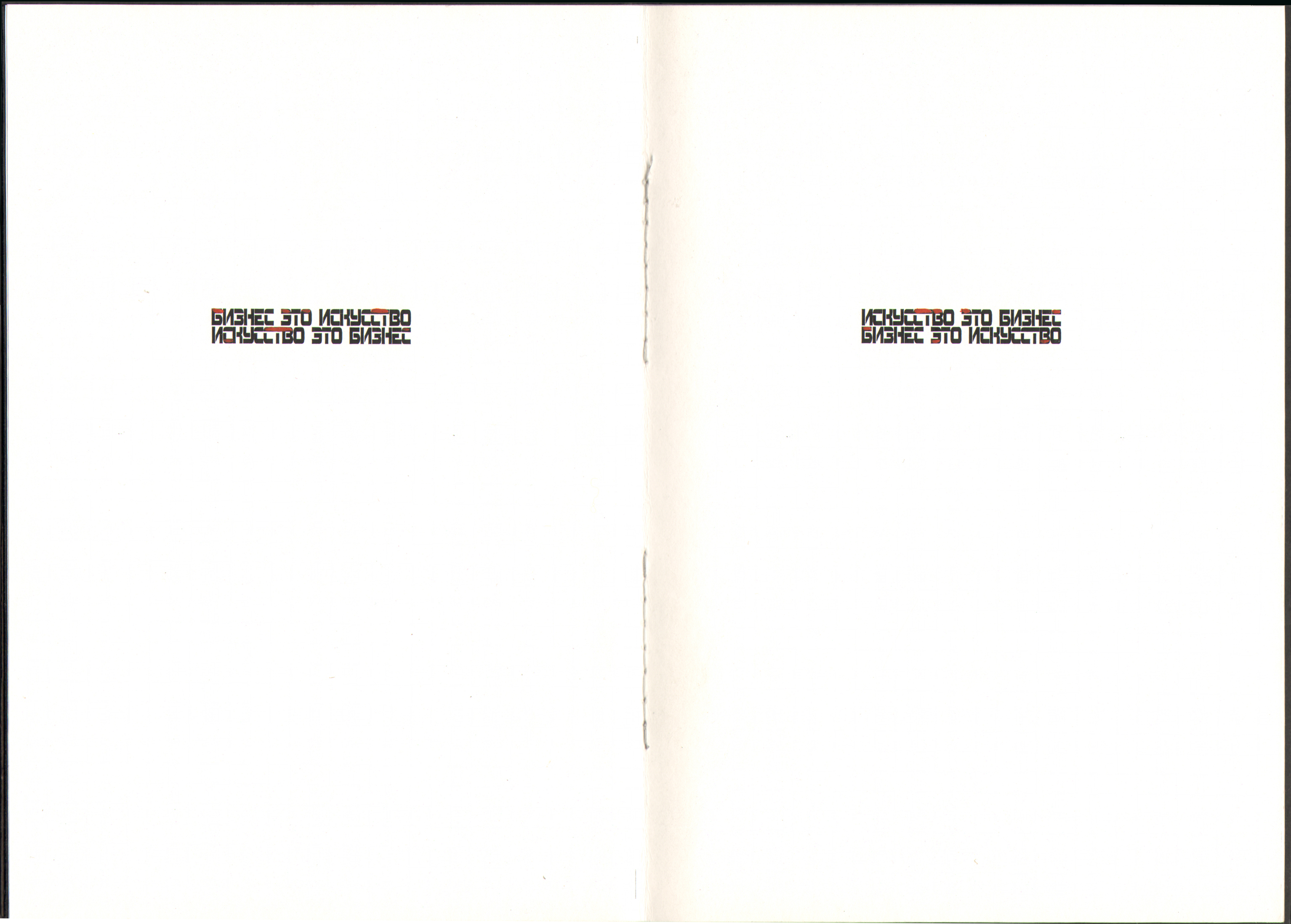

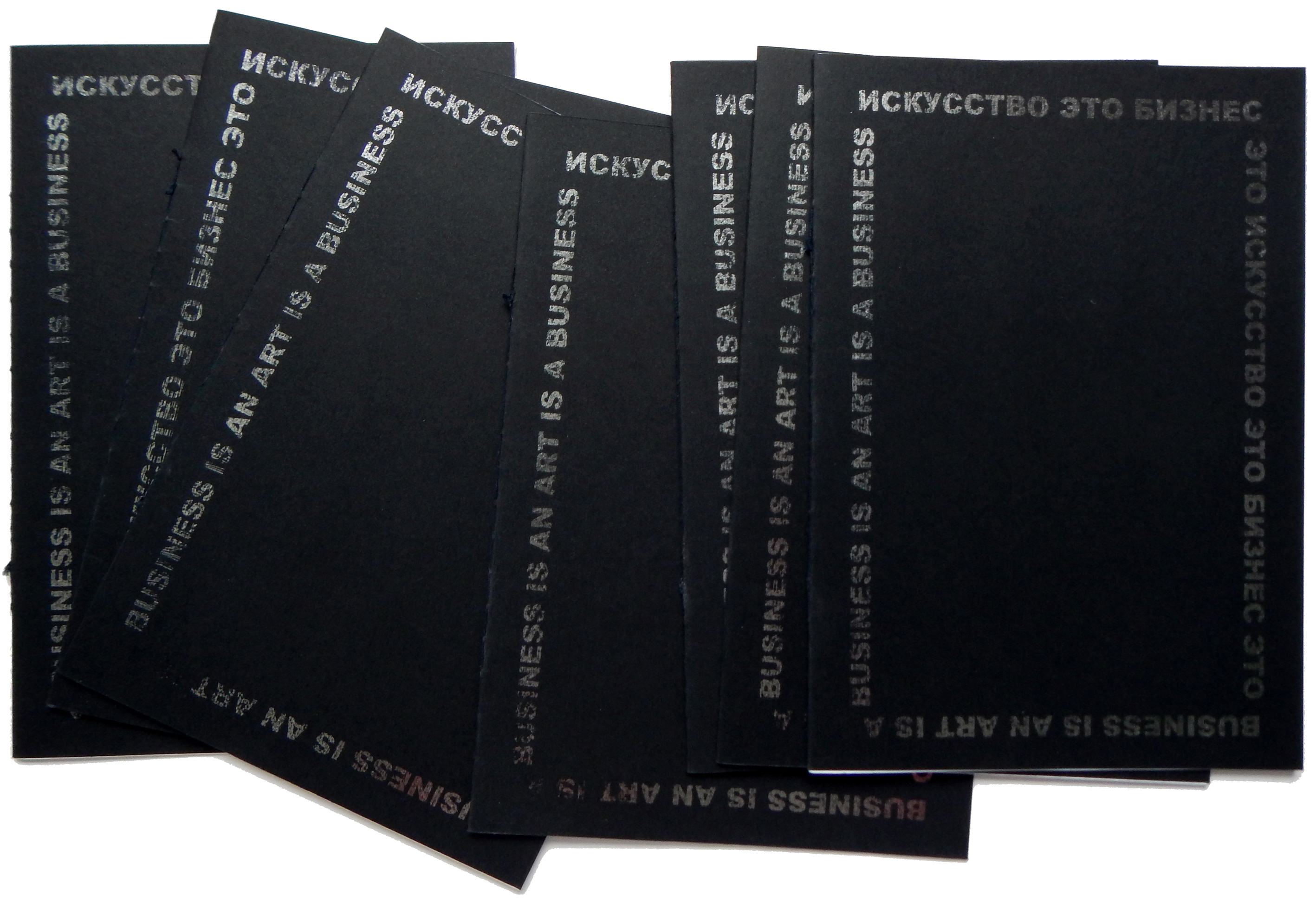

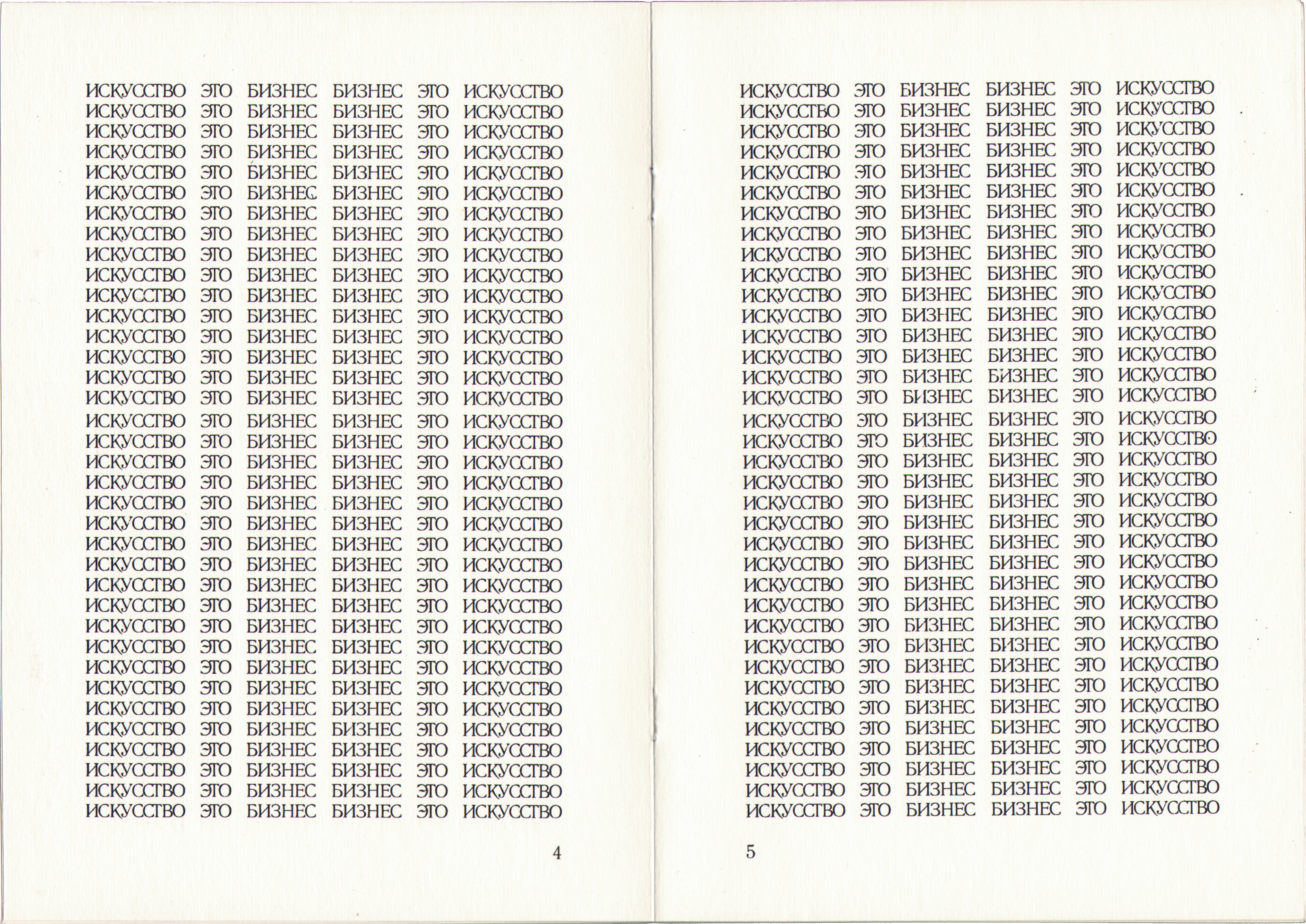

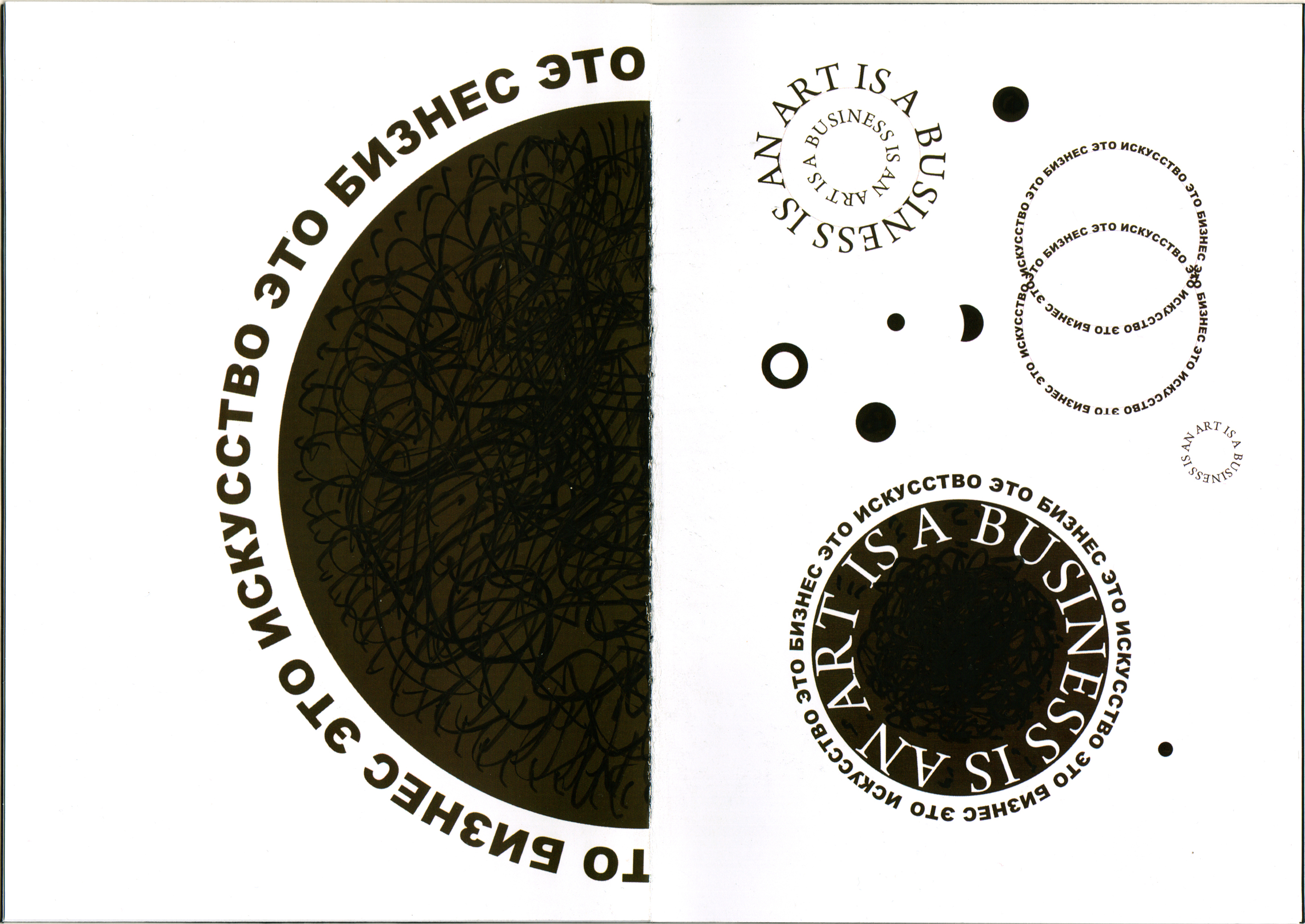

== Exhibitions ==
- Искусство/Бизнес.—Space on Malaya Posadskaya. Institute of Human Philosophy of the Herzen University. — St. Petersburg. September 12—October 22, 2022.
- Современный миф — Персональный миф / Вторая Балтийская биеннале искусства книги.—Anna Akhmatova Literary and Memorial Museum. St. Petersburg. August 10—September 4, 2016.
- Искусство это бизнес / Бизнес это искусство.—Nevsky 20 (rotunda).—St. Petersburg. June 17—July 17, 2015.
- 2-я Независимая международная биеннале графики. St. Petersburg: Manege Central Exhibition Hall. June 25—July 19, 2004.
- Петербург 2000. St. Petersburg: Manege Central Exhibition Hall. January 8—28, 2001.
- Искусство — это бизнес. St. Petersburg: Manege Central Exhibition Hall. 2000.

== Bibliography ==
=== Articles ===
- Parygin A. B. Искусство это бизнес-проект // Economics vs Art: 10th Annual International Conference of the Center for the Study of Economic Culture of St Petersburg State University. — St. Petersburg: Asterion, 2022. — 92 p. — P. 49-51. ISBN 978-5-00188-185-8 (RUS)
- Parygin A. B. Искусство — это бизнес (авторский комментарий к проекту). — St. Petersburg art notebooks, # 68, St. Petersburg: AIS, 2022. — P. 248-254. ISBN 978-5-906442-32-1 (RUS)
- Grigoryants E. I. «Книга художника»: традиции и новации // «Искусство печатной графики: история и современность». В сб. н. статей по материалам научной конференции Четвертые казанские искусствоведческие чтения. November 19–20, 2015. — Kazan: The State Museum of Fine Arts of the Republic of Tatarstan, 2015. — P. 83-86, ill. (RUS)
- Parygin A. B. Искусство это бизнес Бизнес это искусство/ Exhibition booklet. — St. Petersburg. — 2015.
- Blagodatov N. Art is a search, search is an art // St. Petersburg: Neva, No. 2, 2002. — P. 253—255. (RUS)

=== Exhibition catalogues ===
- Parygin A. B. Искусство это бизнес / Бизнес это искусство (exhibition booklet). — St. Petersburg. — 2015. (RUS)
- Бойс, Йозеф Бойс — мой Бойс (exhibition catalog). Auth. introductory article: I. Vvedensky. Rostov-on-Don, 2014. — 60 p., color. ill. — P. 20-21. (RUS)
- Kunst ist Geschäft / Die Verwandlung. 25 Jahre russische Künstlerbücher 1989-2013. LS collection Van Abbemuseum (exhibition catalog). Auth. introductory article: Antje Theise, Klara Erdei, Diana Franssen. Eindhoven, 2013. — 120 p., color. ill. — P. 64-65. ISBN 978-90-79393-11-4
- Петербург 2000. Auth. introductory article: L. Skobkina. St. Petersburg: Manege Central Exhibition Hall. — 2001. — 63 p., ill. (RUS)
