= Dmitry Bellman =

Russian artist-jeweler

Dmitriy Bellman
- Born: Dmitriy Bellman; June 22, 1977 (age 49)
- Education: The State Academy of Fine Arts, Tbilisi
- Known for: Jewelry, design
- Website: www.dmitriybellman.com

Dmitriy Vladimirovich Bellman (Russian: Дмитрий Владимирович Бельман; born in 1977) is a Georgian jeweler craftsman.

Bellman was born in Tbilisi to an engineer and a teacher. When he was 6 years old, he started to attend the Pioneer's Palace. He is a graduate of the State Academy of Fine Arts, Tbilisi, Georgia (1999).

Bellman moved to Moscow, Russia in 2002. In the same year he won his first award in Saint Petersburg. There in 2004, he became the finalist of the International Competition of Young Jewelry Designers. And in 2005, in the Saint Petersburg Manege he won the Gold Medal, the First Degree Diploma and the High Jewelry Art Diploma at the X International Competition of Jewelry and Glyptic Art.

In 2008 and 2009, Bellman has received three awards for significant personal contribution to the national culture and art development: the Gold Medal, the Merit Medal and a Diploma. He was also awarded the title of an academician.

In 2018, his "Microcosm" collection was awarded the Grand Prix at the Russian Diamond Line contest - for innovations in granulation, harmonious design and virtuoso performance.

In 2019, Bellman has won the Modern World in Jewellery Art Works receiving the First Prize of the Gokhran competition.

He is a member of the Creative Union of Russian Artists and an academician of the International Academy of Creative Endeavors.

== Awards ==
- The First Degree Diploma, "The Perfection of Classics" nomination for the "Sunny" ring. VII International Competition of Jewelry and Glyptic Art "The Jewelry Olympus", Saint Petersburg, 2002.
- The Finalist of the International Competition of Young Jewelry Designers "The Image and the Form", Saint Petersburg, 2004.
- The Gold Medal and the First Degree Diploma, "The Classics" nomination and the High Jewellery Art Diploma for the "Sunny" and the "For the Joy of Soul" pendants. X International Competition of Jewelry and Glyptic Art "The Jewelry Olympus", Saint Petersburg, 2005.
- The Gold Medal for the contribution to the national culture from the Creative Union of Russian Artists, 2008.
- An Art Development Merit Medal at the First International Art Salon "Way of Unity", Moscow, 2009.
- A Diploma for the Great Personal Contribution to the Art Development, the First International Art Salon "Way of Unity", Moscow, 2009.
- Grand Prix at the Russian Diamond Line for the "Microcosm" collection, Moscow, 2018.
- The First Prize of the Gokhran Competition "The Modern World in Jewellery Art Works", Moscow, 2019.
- A Carl Faberge International Award for the historical contribution to the development of modern jewellery art, Moscow, 2022.
