= Billman (surname) =

Billman is an English and Swedish surname, a variant of the German Toponymic surname Billmann or Bellman, a name denoting a dweller by the Bille River near Hamburg. Notable people with the surname include:

- George Billman (born 1954), American physiologist
- John Billman (1919–2012), American football player
- Mark Billman (1905–1933), American racecar driver
- Torsten Billman (1909–1989), Swedish artist

== See also ==
- Willi Billmann (1911–2001), German footballer
