= Jean Belmain =

French scholar

Jean Belmain, also known as John Belmain or John Belleman (died after 1557) was a French Huguenot scholar who served as a French-language teacher to future English monarchs King Edward VI and Queen Elizabeth I at the court of their father, Henry VIII.

A zealous Calvinist, Jean Belmain was a refugee from the persecution of Protestants in France. He was rewarded for his services, and may well have had a major role in forming Edward's Protestant views.

Belmain began his teaching duties in 1546 and also completed a French-language translation of the prose devotion Lamentacions of a Sinner written by Henry's last queen Catherine Parr, in which his most noticeable adaptation was to add exclamations.

The British Museum contains a manuscript translation into French of the second Prayer-book of Edward VI, written by Belmain, with a dedicatory epistle to his former pupil. This preface is dated 18 April 1553 from the royal palace of Sheen. In the same collection of manuscripts there is also to be found a translation of Basil the Great's letter to St. Gregory on the solitary life. This work Belmain, in a somewhat curious preface, dedicates to the Lady Elizabeth, with the assurance that it is rendered from the original Greek. This introductory letter contains a rather sharp attack on the phonetic principle of French orthography then coming into vogue, though its author seems perfectly willing to adopt a well-considered reformed method of spelling; and indeed he pronounces his intention of writing a treatise on the subject. There does not seem to be any means of ascertaining the date of this translation, but it is probably earlier than the French version of the Prayer-book.

Jean Belmain was armigerous. On 20 November 1552 he was granted arms by Sir Gilbert Dethick as: Azure a chevron Argent engrailed ermine between three bezants Or on each bezant a demi lion rampant Gules. Crest: A griffin's head Or between two wings Azure bezanty.
