= Belman =

Belman may refer to:

- Belman, Karkal, a small town in Karkala, Udupi, Karnataka, India

== People ==
Belman is also a surname.

- Jamie Belman (born 1985), English actor
- José Belman, Spanish football goalkeeper

== See also ==
- Bellman (disambiguation)
