= Saint Petersburg Manege =

Former riding hall in Saint Petersburg

Coordinates: 59.9340°N 30.3024°E

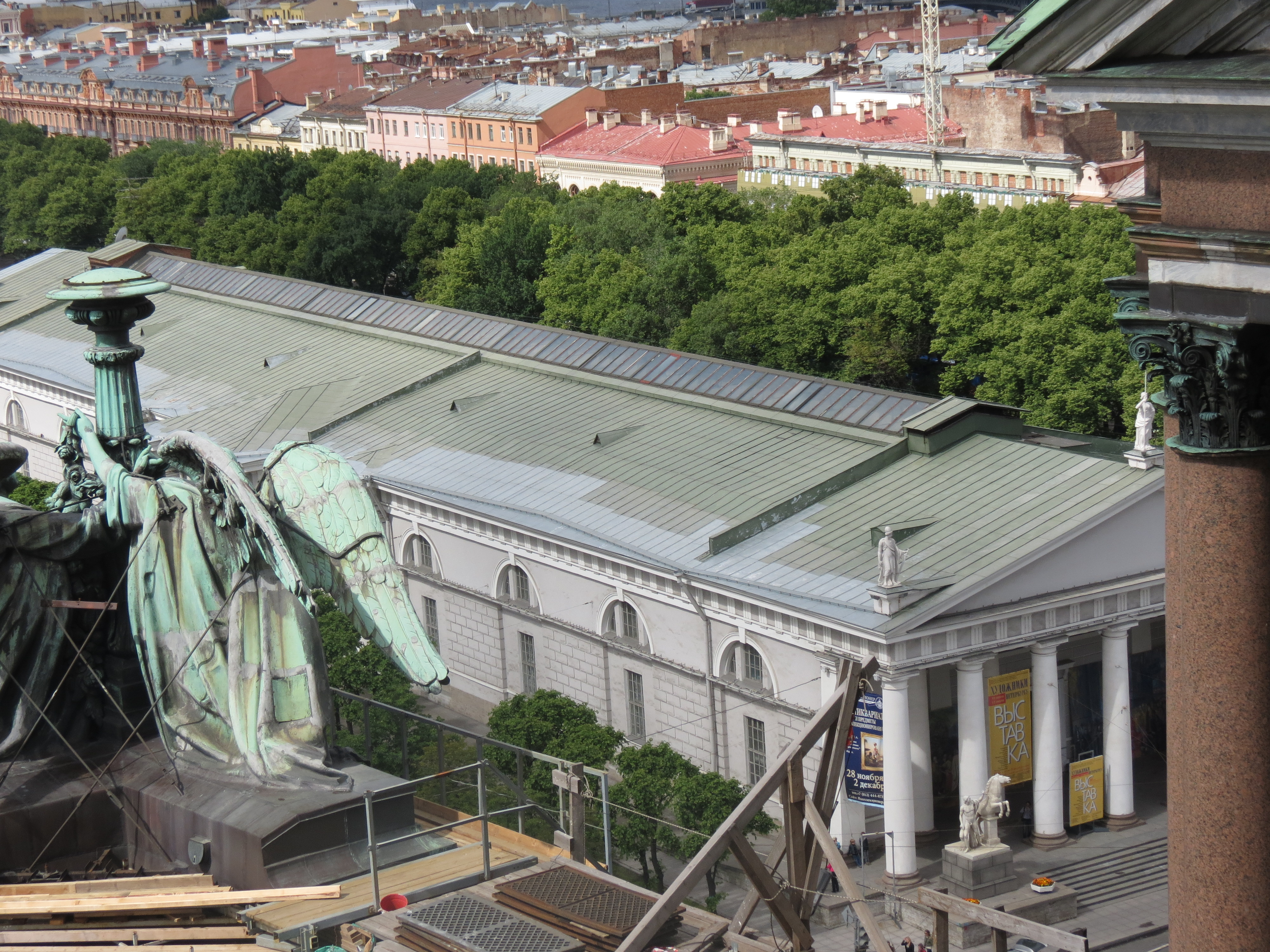
As seen from the upper colonnade of St. Isaac's Cathedral

The Manege is a former riding hall for the Imperial Horse Guards fronting on Saint Isaac's Square in Saint Petersburg, Russia. It was built in 1804–07 to Quarenghi's austere Greek Revival design, one of his last commissions. It replaced a disused canal connecting the Admiralty to the naval warehouses. The Horse Guards Boulevard takes its name from the building.

The Manege is a low, rectangular block with arched openings and lunettes. According to the Companion Guide, "it mimics a 5th-century BC Athenian temple with a portico of eight Doric columns bearing a pediment and bas reliefs". The marble statues of the Dioscuri standing beside their horses were patterned by sculptor Paolo Triscornia after the Fontana dei Dioscuri in Rome.

After the Russian Revolution the riding academy was rebuilt to accommodate a NKVD garage. A second floor was added to the building in 1931. Since the latest reconstruction campaign (dating to the late 1970s), the Saint Petersburg Manege has housed the city's main exhibition hall.
