= Dmitry Kawarga =

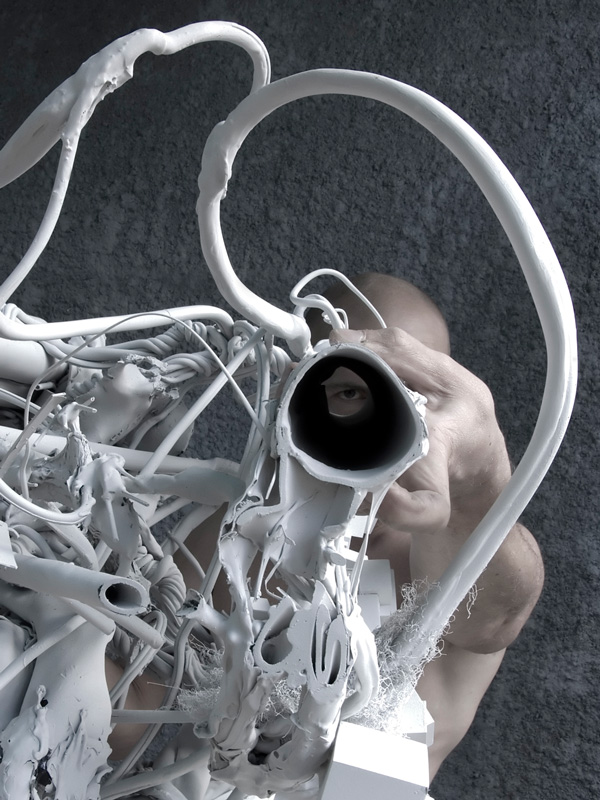
- Photo-Kawarga
- Born: Moscow, Russia
- Known for: Contemporary art
- Style: Multimedia works, sculpture, interactive installation, kinetik art
- Movement: Biomorphic Radical
- Awards: Honorary Mention, Prix Ars Electronica, The winner of the competition "Monument", The project of the monuments to Boris Yeltsin., Laureate of The Kuryokhin Art Award (Best public Art) Laureate of The Zverev Art Prize (third prize)
- Website: Official website

Dmitry Kawarga (Russian: Дмитрий Викторович Каварга) born in Moscow, Russia is a Russian artist. Kawarga began working in his own style of "biomorphism" striving to create a synthesis of science, art and technology. His art is featured in numerous museums and is part of the permanent collection of Erarta, Russia's largest private museum of contemporary art located in Saint Petersburg.

== Style ==
Kawarga began his career as a painter and got his original art form among Moscow non-conformists. The flat surfaces gained more and more pronounced facture, and became ever more monumental; forms started to emerge in the manner of reliefs, and finally turned into sculptures.

Currently, he works with a wide range of polymers that serve as the material of large-scale landscape sculptures as miniature detailed compositions.

A big cycle of his works called Science Art, because in addition to the monumental sculptures and elaborate reliefs, he also produces kinetic and interactive installations, complete with biofeedback devices and robots.

His work synthesizes science, art and technology, and he often involves engineers and programmers in the creative process.

His style has been variously described as "biomorphism" or "biogenic art," while his insistence on the end of anthropocentrism has caused others to call him a practitioner of "post-human" art.

Member of a large group project in the format of the artist's book A City as an Artist's Subjectivity (2019–2020).

== Permanent collections ==
- Hermitage Museum. Hermitage Academic Library/ Rare Books and Manuscripts Sector. (St. Petersburg).
- KAWARGA-SKETE Gonginichy, Podporozhsky district, Leningrad region
- ARCHSTOYANIE, Nikola-Lenivets, Dzerzhinsky District, Kaluga region, Russia
- The Museum of Academician I.P. Pavlov in Koltushi
- Signet Bank
- LA Collection’ Air, Luzern, Suisse
- Sergey Kuryokhin Art Center, St Petersburg
- ART4.RU Contemporary Art Museum, Moscow
- Erarta museum of contemporary art, St Petersburg
- Museum of Ecology and Local History, Muravlenko, Russia
- Museum Center of Krasnoyarsk, Krasnoyarsk, Russia

== Gallery ==
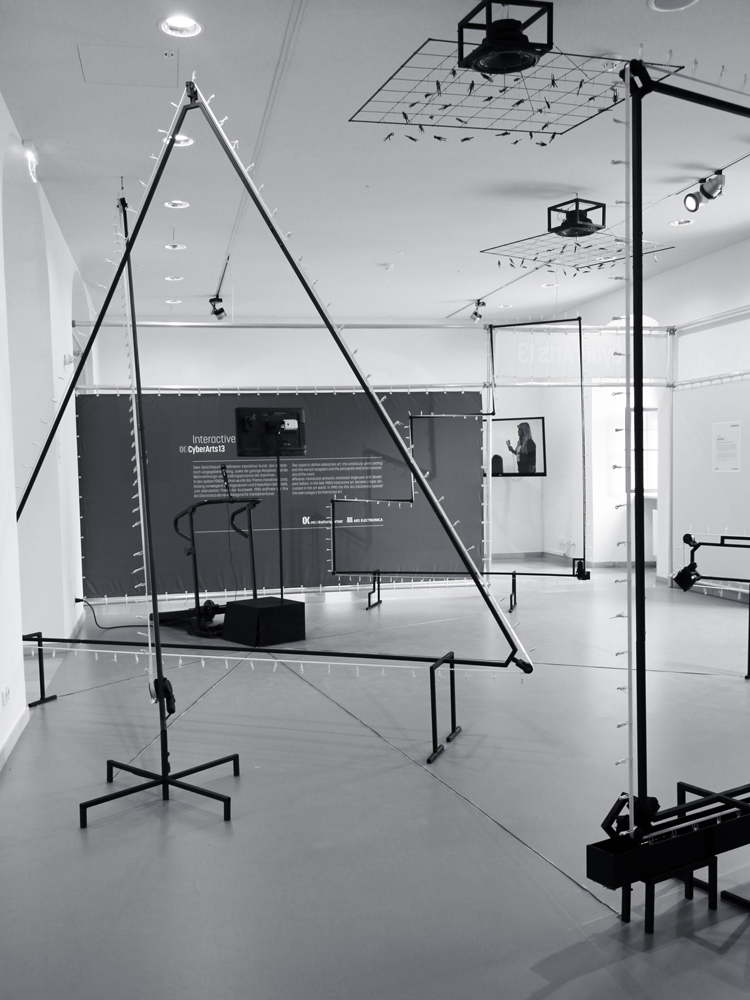
Down with Wrestlers with Systems and Mental Nonadapters! 2011

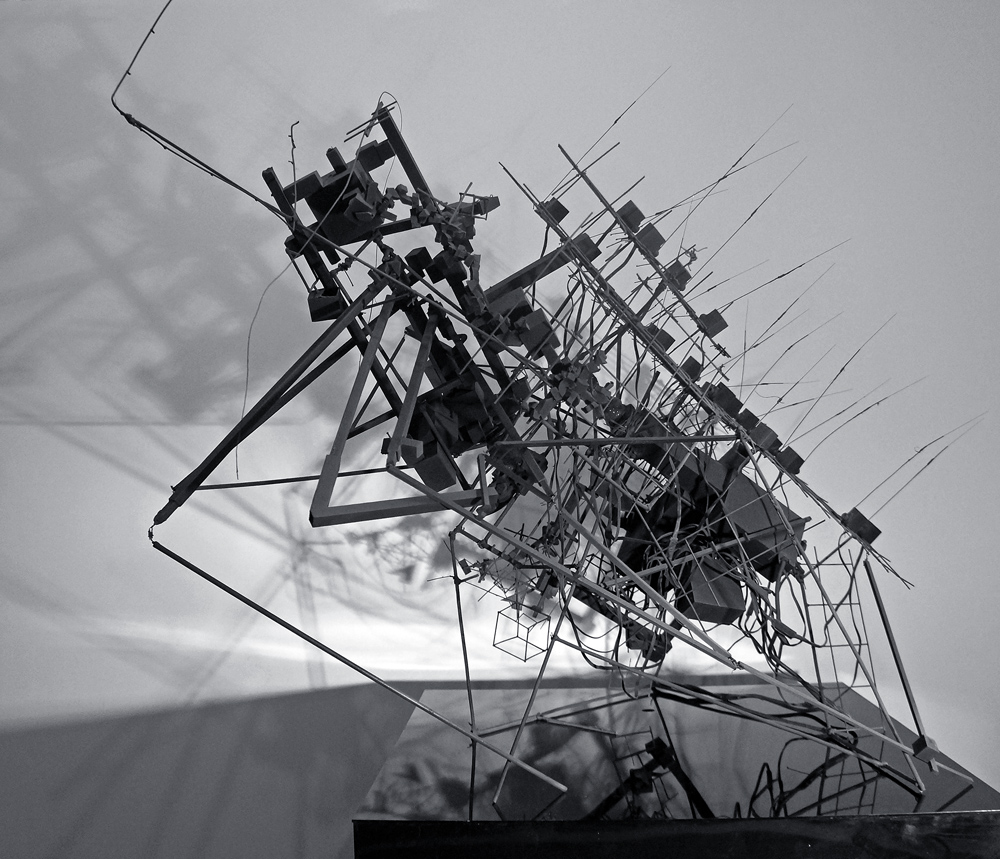
Complexity Observer 2014

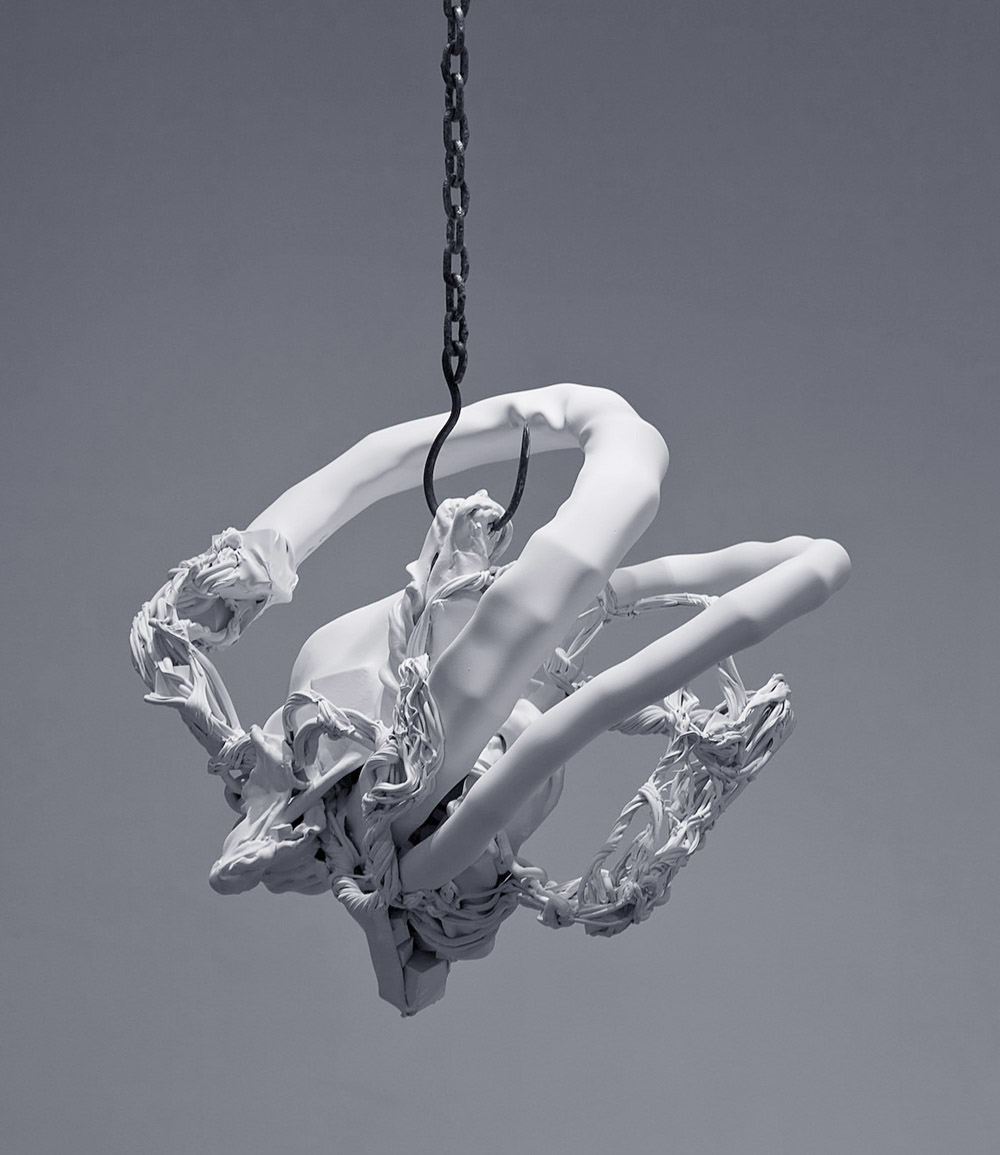
Form-560 2009

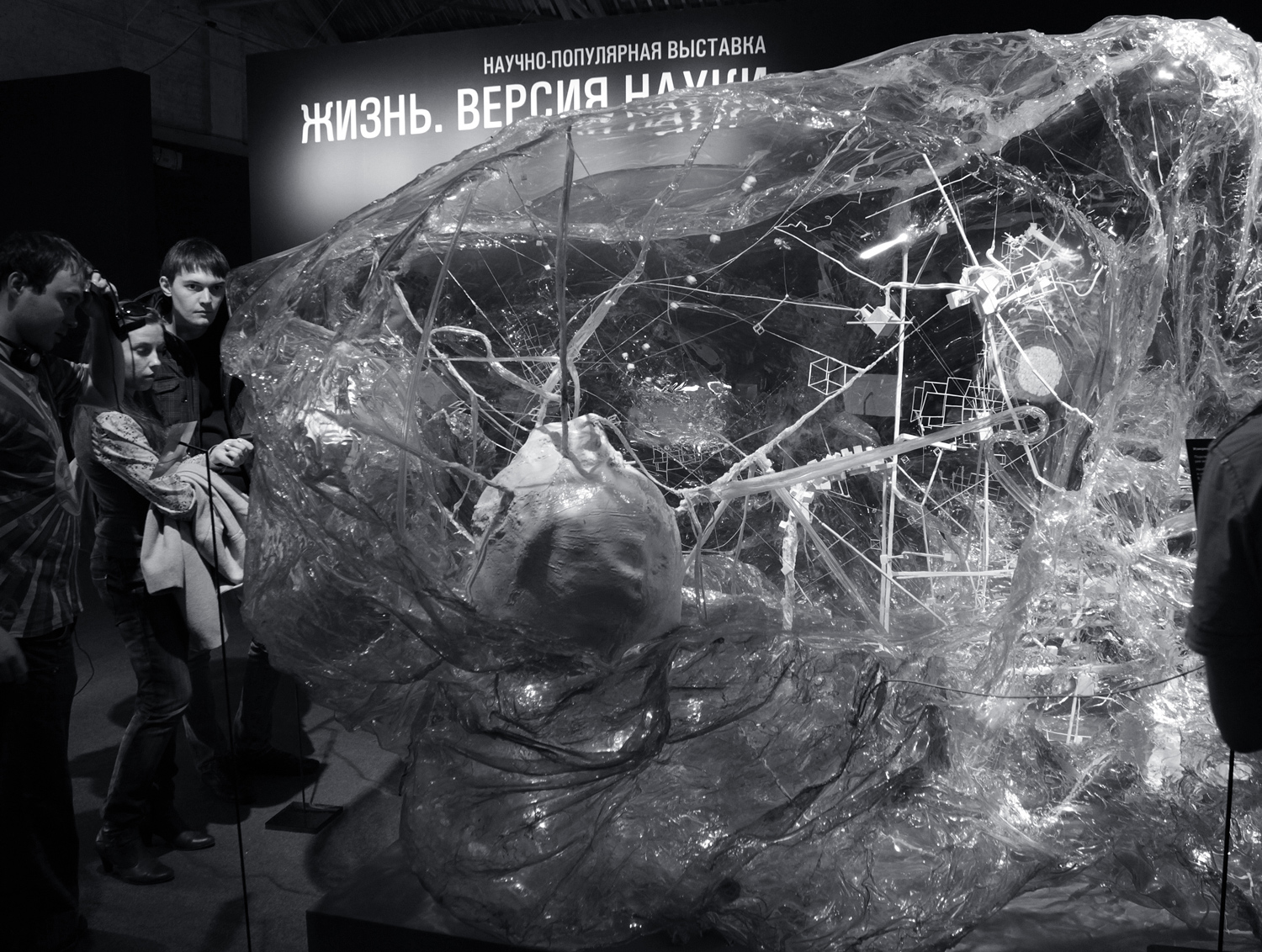
Model of biometric reflexions 2011

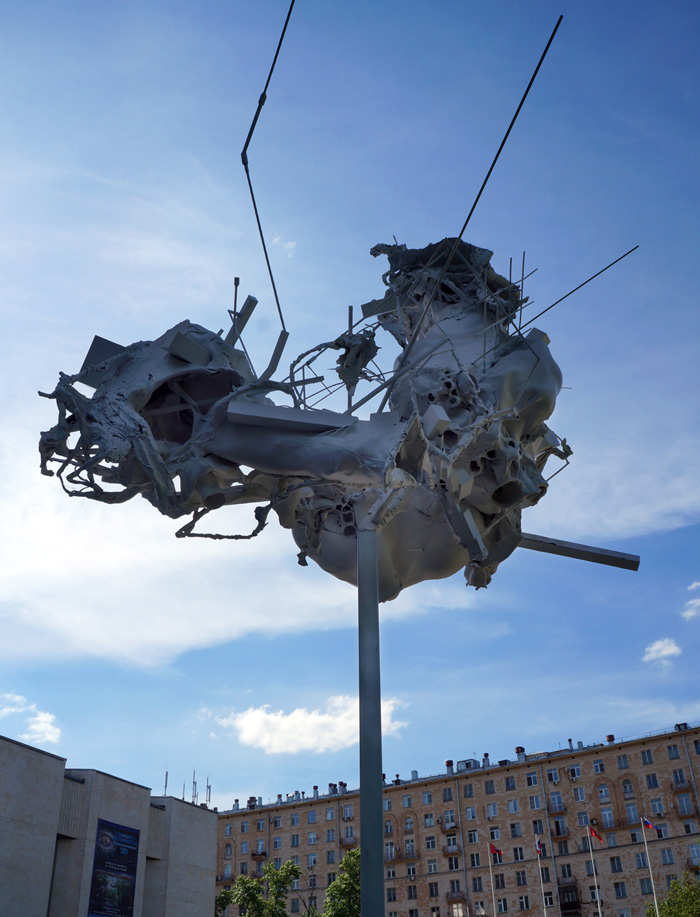
The inhabited sculptures 2013

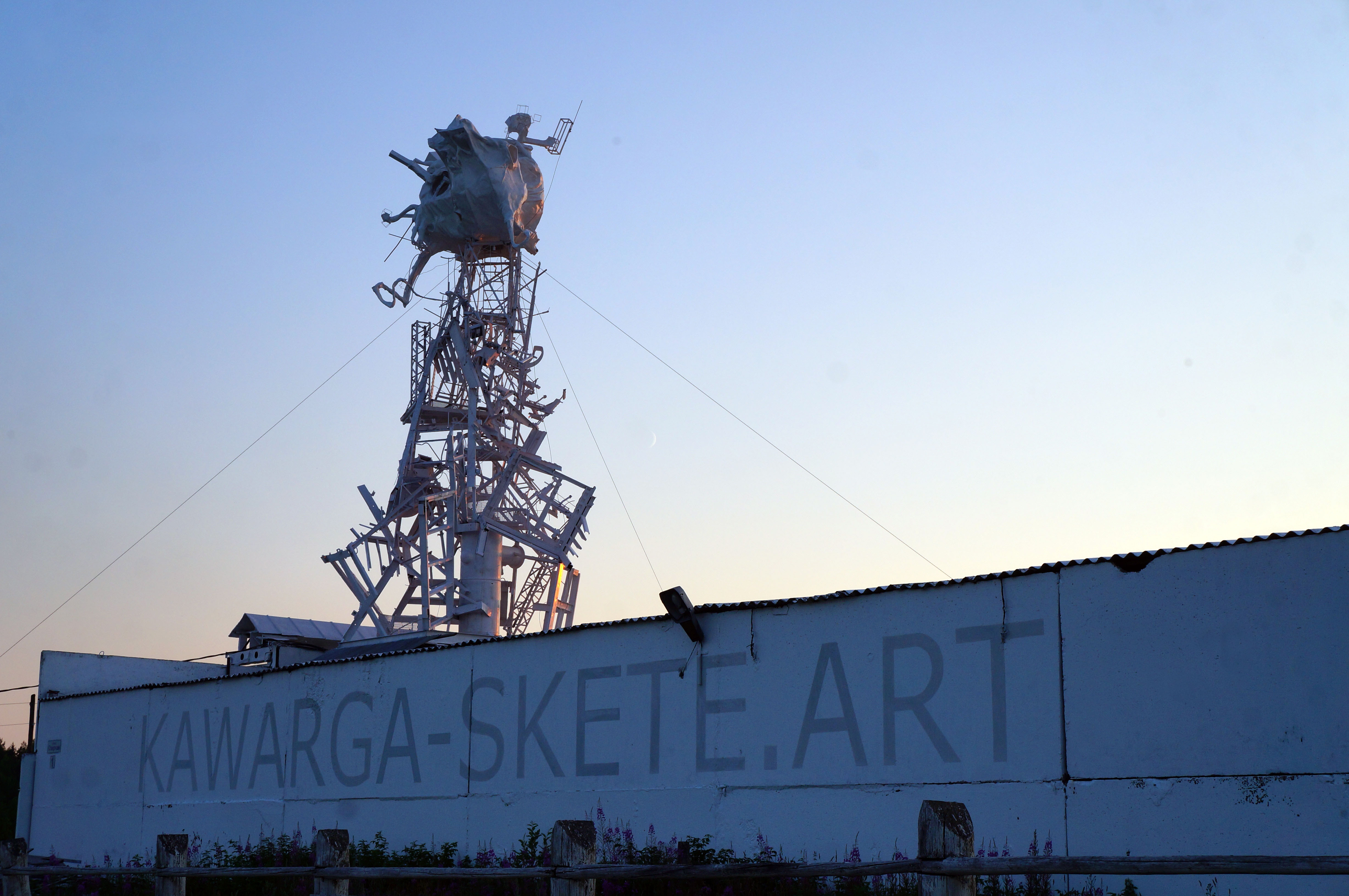
KAWARGA-SKETE 2017

== Press ==
- Virtual Art Center this TALK with Dmitry kawarga.
- Signet Bank - Interview with Artist Dmitry Kawarga
- Russian maecenas - His Own Little Piece of the Planet
- Project Baltia

== Exhibitions ==
Kawarga has been a participant of international exhibitions and festivals of contemporary art, including Lexus Hybrid Art, Ars Electronica and Electronic Language International Festival, Cyfest etc.

=== Solo exhibitions ===
- 2020 - «Transport substance», The Moscow Transport Museum
- 2020 - «The Athletes of Neofuturism», Art-Space KazanMall
- 2020 - «The front wall was removed», Gallery of contemporary art «BizOn», Kazan
- 2019 - «Norilsk's Substance», BAZIS, CENTRUL DE INTERES, Cluj-Napoca, Romania
- 2019 - «Museum's line», Saint Petersburg
- 2019 - «Anthropocentrism Toxicosis», Ferenczy Museum Center, Szentendre, Hungary
- 2018 - «Skins of Conceptual Constructions», ELECTROMUSEUM, Moscow
- 2018 - «Polymeric Offside», MUZEON - Fallen Monument Park, Moscow
- 2014 - "Biomorphic dust", Saint Peterburg, RU
- 2014 - "...at the deep end black fishes", The ex-cinema-theatre "Udarnik", Moscow, RU
- 2012 - "Kawarga. Apocalypse 21.12", Pop/off/art Gallery, Moscow Contemporary Art Center Winzavod, Moscow, RU
- 2012 - "Paleo-Geo-Morphologies", Barbarian-art Gallery, Zurich, SW
- 2010 - "Topography of creative evolution", GridchinHall, Moscow Area, RU
- 2010 - "Ouroboros" Gallery Brissot Art Contemporain, Paris, FR
- 2009 - "Biostructures" Barbarian-art gallery, Zurich, SW
- 2009 - "Coming into the theme" gallery pop/off/art, Moscow, RU
- 2007-2008 - "Trepanation of the Thought-forms" gallery pop/off/art, RU
- 2007 - "Photocompressing" Business house "Mohovaja, 7", Moscow, RU
- 2005 - "Biomorphic radicalism in the destructive synthesis" gallery "Sam Brook", Moscow, RU
- 2003 - "Retrospective Cut" Natural Science University, Moscow, RU
- 2002 - "Project 2x10" Callery A-3, RU
- 2001 - Science-n-Art Project in cooperation with Honored Inventor of Russia V.Beshekov
- 1999 - "Saturated Landscape" Staraja Basmannja St. 21, Moscow, RU
- 1998 - "Immersion into the Summer" in Moscow branch of The World Bank, RU
- 1997 - "I'm bored with everyone and I'm tired." in Beljaevo Gallery, Moscow, RU
- 1994 - Murals in Theatre "Perovskaja St.", Moscow, Ru
- 1993 - Kashirka Gallery, Moscow, RU

=== Group exhibitions ===
2021

- Zverev Art Prize. Exhibition of the Nominees, CCA Winzavod
- Pavlov's substance, The new anthropology and pavlov school, A permanent exhibition in Koltushi, Leningrad region

2020

- CosMoscow International Contemporary Atr Fair, Gostiny Dvor, Moscow
- «The city as subjectivity», State Museum of Urban Sculpture, St. Petersburg

2019

- THIS IS NOT A BOOK: Dmitry Volkov Collection. MMOMA
- «Plastic mass», The State Russian Museum / The Marble Palace
- «THE LOOKOUT», Contemporary Art Fest, Fort Konstantin

2018

- Breakthrough, Cultural Foundation Ekaterina
- Innovation as an Artistic Technique, Hermitage
- The RUSSIAN ART & ANTIQUE FAIR

2017

- Yearning for the Sky, Special project of Moscow Biennale
- Pieter Bruegel. Inverted world, Design center ARTPLAY, Moscow
- Exhibition of works by longlisted artists of The Kuryokhin Award, St. Petersburg
- Direct encounter, Solyanka VPA, Moscow

2016

- Martyr, Agency ArtRu, Moscow
- Contemporary Russia, The State Central Museum of Contemporary History of Russia
- Every evening before sleep, Solyanka VPA, Moscow
- Cosmoscow International Contemporary Art Fair, International Contemporary Atr Fair, Gostiny Dvor
- «Quantum Entanglement 2.0», Arsenal, Kremlin, Nizhny Novgorod
- "Archstoyanie", 11th international festival of landscape objects. Nikola-Lenivets, Dzerzhinsky District, Kaluga region, Russia.

2015

- "Orient Express", the special project of 6th Moscow Biennale, Centre MARS
- "Nadezhda – The Hope", the special project of 6th Moscow Biennale
- "Urals Transcendental", the special project of 6th Moscow Biennale, ArtPlay
- "Waxworks Exhibition", Palace of Culture Bauman Moscow State Technical University, Moscow
- "Promise of landscape", Perm Museum of Contemporary Art

2014

- "Quantum Entanglement", Laboratoria Art&Science Space and FutureEverything, Moscow
- Electronic Language International Festival, São Paulo, Brazil, (catalog)
- "Zoo-Zoo", State Darwin Museum, Moscow, (catalog)

2013

- Kandinsky Prize, The Udarnik Cinema, Moscow, (catalog)
- Open Innovations (Forum and Technology Show), Crocus Expo IEC, Moscow, (catalog)
- "Contemporary art in the Traditional Museum", The Saint Petersburg city museum festival, (catalog)
- "Total Recall – The Evolution of memory", Arselectronica, Austria, Linz, (catalog)
- "Frontier", Science-Art-Lab, Moscow
- "Goszakaz" /A Governmental Order/, Moscow Contemporary Art Center Winzavod & Pechersky Gallery
- The show of the pretenders on Sergey Kuryokhin Modern Art Award in nomination The Best Art Projects, (catalog)

2012

- "Resonant Matter", Russian Museum, Marble Palace
- "Way. Road.", Gallery ph_Manometr, ArtPlay, Moscow
- "Lexus Hybrid Art", ArtPlay, Moscow

2011

- "Free spaces", the special project of 4 Moscow Biennale, Agensy ArtRu, Moscow, (catalog)
- "Pro-Contra", International Symposium, the special project of 4 Moscow Biennale, ArtPlay, (catalog)
- "Rewriting Worlds: Dada Moscow", the special project of 4 Moscow Biennale, ArtPlay
- "ArtFocus for Technologies: Charm&Challenge", Ural forum of Industry&Innovations "INNOPROM 2011" Ekaterinburg
- "The Life. The science version", Moscow Contemporary Art Center Winzavod, Moscow, (catalog)
- "New sculpture, Chaos and Structure", New Museum, Saint Petersburg, (catalog)
- "Distortions of the Earth", Agency ArtRu, Moscow, (catalog)

2010

- Kandinsky Prize, Central House of Artists, Moscow, (catalog)
- "Club 21 - Remaking the scene", One Marylebone, the special project of Frieze Art Fair London, England, (catalog)
- "A New Formalism", Museum of a City sculpture, Saint Petersburg, (catalog)
- "Reality metamorphoses, or Games with Time", Zverev's centre of contemporary art, Moscow
- "0,5" Jubilee exhibition, gallery pop/off/art, Moscow, (catalog)

2009

- "New sculpture, Chaos and Structure", Coluyanka gallery, Moscow
- "Good News" Orel Art Gallery, London, England, (catalog)
- "Art Moscow" 13 th International Art Fair, pop/off/art gallery
- "Night of museums" Tretyakov Gallery, Moscow
- "Evolution of a dream", State Darwin Museum
- EUROP'ART'09 Grand-Saconnex Geneva, Switzerland

2008

- "Atlantis" gallery A3, Moscow
- "Invasion : Evasion" Baibakov art projects, (catalog)
- "Cyberfest" Youth Educational Centre of Hermitage Museum, Saint Petersburg
- "Power of Water" Russian Museum, Saint Petersburg, (catalog)
- "Tunguska meteorite", 100-years of falling, Krasnoyarsk
- "Art About Mortality", in memory N. Konstantinova, Rostov on Don, (catalog)
- "Sleeping district", gallery ArtMarin

2007

- Competition on the project a monument to Boris Yeltsin
- - 7th Krasnoyarsk Biennial 2007
- Work is exhibited at a show-window of a museum ART4.RU Contemporary Art Museum

1988 - 2005

- Art Manezh 2005, Moscow
- "World of War" Museum Of Decorative Art, Moscow 2003
- The Size Does Matter" Central House of Artists, Moscow 2003
- "Object and Thing" Museum Of Decorative Art, Moscow 2001
- "Action Initiation" Art Laboratory Dominanta, Moscow, 1997
- "Bleeding of Spring" Malaja Gruzinskaja, Moscow, 1997
- Art Manezh 1996, Moscow
- "Fun-Art" Central House of Artists, Moscow, 1994
- Group "Hummer" Manezh, Moscow, 1992
- "Golden Brush" Central House of Artists, Moscow, 1992
- - Malaja Gruzinskaja in Manezh, Moscow, 1991
- "Space and Spirit", Central House of Artists, Moscow, 1991 (catalog)
- Group "Hummer" Central House of Artists, Moscow, 1988
- In Memory of Pjatnitzkogo Malaja Gruzinskaja, Moscow, 1988
- "Labyrinth" Palace of Youth, Moscow, 1988
