= Alexander Kots =

Alexander Kots may refer to:

- Aleksandr Kots (1880–1964), Russian zoologist
- Alexander Kots (journalist) (born 1978), Russian journalist
