= Milka (dog) =

Dog owned by Joseph Stalin

Milka was a red female Cocker Spaniel dog owned by Joseph Stalin. She was given to Stalin by Wilhelmina of the Netherlands as a gift for his 70th birthday. Stalin gave Milka to his son Vasily Stalin as he was too old to care for it. She eventually outlived Stalin by 8 years. Milka birthed a litter of 22 puppies. Her grandchild Dondon became a prestigious Soviet champion.

After her death, Milka was taxidermied and is now displayed at the State Darwin Museum.

== See also ==
- List of individual dogs
