= Maxim Zhestkov =

Digital artist

- Максим Жестков
- Born: September 20, 1985 (age 40); Ulyanovsk
- Years active: 2005—current
- Movement: Digital art
- Website: https://zhestkov.studio/

Maxim Zhestkov is a London-based digital artist and designer. His significant style includes using spheres as a universal medium that represents blocks in complex structures, such as 'emotions, behaviors, thought processes, relationships, life, planets and the universe.'

== Early life and education ==
Born and raised in Ulyanovsk, Maxim got into digital illustration and video games as a child. He studied architecture and graphic design at Ulyanovsk State University.

== Work ==
As a designer, Zhestkov worked on commissions for Google, Ford, Microsoft, Adobe, MTV, Nokia, Adidas, UEFA, BMW.

In his art practice, he aims to 'create a universal visual language that combines design, architecture, and computer graphics.' Using realistic digital simulations that are based on real-world physics, Zhestkov explores algorithms made by nature and humanity.

In his work, the artist imagines different scenarios of the future, such as computing devices integrated into architecture in his film Computations or artificial intelligence controlling its own evolution in Artificial Organisms. Another theme present in his oeuvre is the examination of natural forces and patterns.

Working with the medium of Virtual reality, Zhestkov created project Modules that became a VR Awards 2023 Finalist as VR Experience of the Year.

== Screenings and exhibitions ==
- LUX: Poetic Resolution, 2023
- Nassima Landau, 2022
- Kunsthalle Zurich, 2022
- Unit London, 2021
- Contemporary Istanbul, 2021
- Cosmoscow, 2021
- Hermitage Museum, 2019
- Aranya Art Center, 2019
- Chi K11 Art Museum, 2019
- Ars Electronica Festival, 2018
