= Ladygin =

Ladygin (Russian: Ладыгин) is a Russian masculine surname, its feminine counterpart is Ladygina. Notable people with the surname include:

- Kirill Ladygin (born 1978), Russian auto racing driver
- Nadezhda Ladygina-Kohts (1889–1963), Russian zoopsychologist
