= Lorenz's blind snake =

Conservation status
- Data Deficient (IUCN 3.1)

Scientific classification
- Kingdom: Animalia
- Phylum: Chordata
- Class: Reptilia
- Order: Squamata
- Suborder: Serpentes
- Family: Typhlopidae
- Genus: Ramphotyphlops
- Species: R. lorenzi

Binomial name
- Ramphotyphlops lorenzi (F. Werner, 1909)

Synonyms
- Typhlops lorenzi F. Werner, 1909; Ramphotyphlops lorenzi — McDiarmid, Campbell & Touré, 1999

Species of snake

Lorenz's blind snake (Ramphotyphlops lorenzi), also known commonly as Lorenz's worm snake, is a species of snake in the family Typhlopidae. The species is native to Maritime Southeast Asia.

== Etymology ==
The specific name, lorenzi, is in honor of German ornithologist Theodore K. Lorenz.

== Geographic range ==
R. lorenzi is found in Indonesia (Borneo).

== Behavior ==
R. lorenzi is terrestrial and fossorial.

== Reproduction ==
R. lorenzi is oviparous.
