= Nadezhda Ladygina-Kohts =

Russian ethologist and psychologist

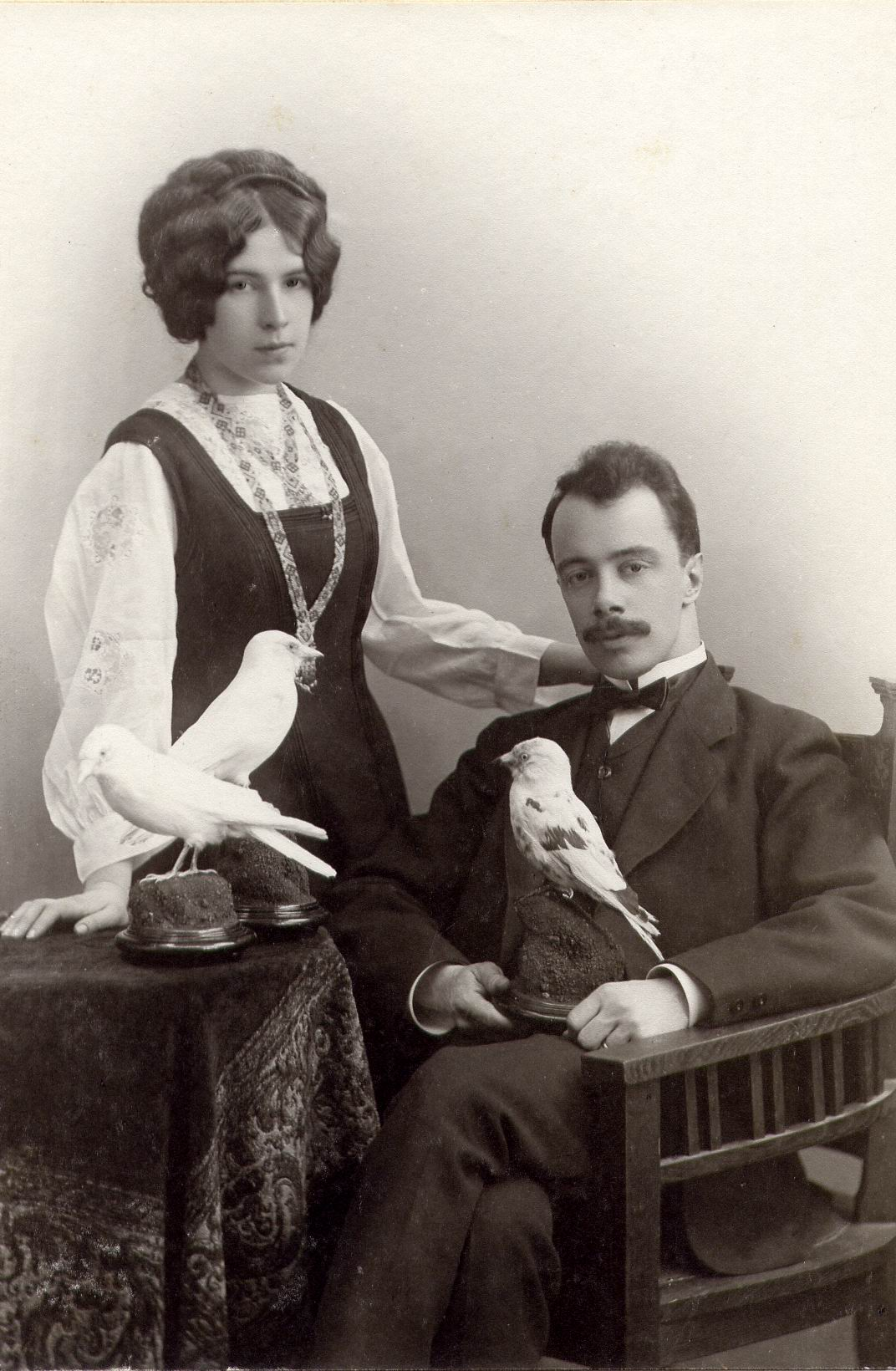
- Born: May 18, 1889; Penza, Russia
- Died: September 3, 1963 (aged 74); Moscow
- Scientific career
- Fields: Ethology, Animal cognition
- Workplaces: Darwin Museum in Moscow, Institute of Philosophy of the Soviet Academy of Sciences

Nadezhda Nikolaevna Ladygina-Kohts (Надежда Николаевна Ладыгина-Котс; May 18, 1889 – September 3, 1963) was a Russian zoopsychologist and comparative psychologist best known for her work comparing human and chimpanzee behavior, emotion, and cognition. She is the author of several books on ape and monkey behavior and served as the co-director of the first natural history museum in Russia.

== Early life and education ==
Ladygina was born in Penza, Russia on May 18, 1889. Her father was a music teacher and her mother did not have any formal education. After attending gymnasium, she was a student at the Moscow Higher Women's Courses/Moscow Advanced Courses for Women from 1913 until 1916. It was here that she met and married Alexander F. Kohts who taught biology. During her studies she founded the Psychological Laboratory of the Darwin Museum. She finished and received her degree in the biological sciences, with a concentration in comparative psychology, at Moscow University in 1917.

== Career ==
Koht's primarily studied animal behavior and how it compared to that of humans. She served as the co-director of the Darwin Museum in Moscow and studied a variety of animals such as parrots, dogs, monkeys, and apes throughout her career.

=== Moscow's State Darwin Museum ===
The Darwin Museum, founded by A.F. Kohts with assistance from Nadia Kohts, was the first and only museum of natural history in Russia. It was derived from A.F. Kohts' teaching museum which was begun in 1907 at the Women's Higher Courses Institute of Moscow University. A.F. Kohts was trained as a taxidermist, and had collected specimens from several expeditions including to southern Siberia, and was greatly inspired by Charles Darwin's works. Therefore, the museum served as the foundation of his private collection of zoological taxidermy and scientific literature. The museum was arranged in an artistic manner, so as to display the works in a creative and informative way, but without too much textual information. The displays included staged taxidermy, paintings and drawings of plants, animals, and their habitats, reconstructive illustrations and sculpture representing prehistoric flora and fauna, and depictions of the lives of evolutionary theorists such as Charles Darwin himself. A.F. Kohts believed that this museum should depict natural history as an "exciting visual experience" for visitors in order to spark and stimulate visitors' imaginations while he also offered guided lecture tours to the public. A.F. Kohts taught courses for women at the Moscow University, lecturing on Darwin's work and supplementing them with visual aids from his collection.

Nadia Kohts primarily worked at and served as the co-director of the Darwin Museum in Moscow. She began as a student at the Moscow Higher Women's Courses and founded the Psychological Laboratory at the Darwin Museum. Kohts and her husband were both greatly interested in and based their work on Darwin's theory evolution. So, while her husband managed the museum, Kohts carried on psychological and comparative experiments, exploring the similarities and differences between human and animal behavior and intelligence. Her experiments are still regarded today as important and informative in the field of comparative and evolutionary psychology.

Because of the political climate in Russia, the Kohts' had to take certain precautions to protect themselves and their work. Russian geneticist Trofim Lysenko, who was a strong proponent of the inheritance of acquired traits and opponent to Mendelian genetics, had earned support of Soviet leader Joseph Stalin. Under Lysenko, Soviet scientists who refused to renounce Mendelian genetics had been dismissed, sent to labor camps, or even sentenced to death. Consequently, Nadia and her husband hid their literature and research documents among the taxidermy collection in the museum basement and strategically placed a large statue of Jean Baptiste Lamarck at the museum entrance.

=== Academic colleagues ===
Nadia Kohts' spent years corresponding with prominent psychologists of the time. One such colleague was Robert Yerkes, a comparative psychologist and ape researcher from Pennsylvania. Yerkes and his daughter visited and stayed with Kohts in Moscow in 1929 to discuss her ongoing project comparing chimpanzee and human toddler behavior. Yerkes and Kohts carried on correspondence and advised each other on their respective work until 1942, In 1930, Kohts had a bust of Yerkes made to place in the Darwin Museum, along with a copy she sent to Yerkes back in the US. Yerkes dedicated pages of his published works to Kohts and her research achievements.

In January 1960, Kohts received a letter from notable American psychologist Harry F. Harlow. This letter, in which Harlow describes his admiration and following of Kohts' work, sparked a correspondence that lasted two years. Harlow and Kohts exchanged reprints of their works during this time, and he had an employee at his lab translate her documents from Russian to English. After reading her published and ongoing research, Harlow admitted to Kohts that he had not given her enough credit for her work before, and that the field owed a great debt to her scientific accomplishments.

=== Institute of Philosophy of the Soviet Academy of the Sciences ===
In 1945 Kohts became a senior research assistant at the Institute of Philosophy of the Soviet Academy of the Sciences. Here she continued her research and advised students of psychology and animal behavior. Her students studied topics ranging from the behavior of beavers, the influence of man on animal behavior, and the preparation of animals for space flight.^{8}

== Contributions ==
=== Infant Chimpanzee and Human Child: A Comparative Study ===
Koht's major contribution to the field of psychology is her 1935 publication Infant Chimpanzee and Human Child. The book is a point by point comparison of chimpanzee and human emotion and intelligence. Kohts describes in unprecedented detail the expressions, emotions, and behaviors of a young chimpanzee named Joni and her own son, Roody.

Kohts began the study when she acquired a young chimpanzee, Joni, from Moscow animal traders in 1913. Estimates of Joni's age ranged from 3 to 7 years old, but he was likely even younger. After about 2.5 years of study with Kohts, Joni died from pneumonia and was aged at about 4 years old. Kohts documented Joni's emotions and the behaviors, facial movements, body postures, gestures, and vocalizations that accompanied each one. Among the emotions she documents are: general excitability (related to worry, sorry, or anger), joy (laughter, smiling, and playfulness), sadness (crying), and playing behaviors (running, jumping, play with animals and people, pulling objects, climbing, watching objects, familiarization with objects, etc.).

Nine years after the death of Joni, Kohts gave birth to her son, Roody in 1925. She then documented the similarities and differences between the two species for each emotion and/or behavior. The final product was first published in 1935. It was not until 2002 that it was translated into English. The research within it is often described as being far ahead of its time and a classic that belongs on the bookshelf of any student of primate behavior and cognition.

=== Match-to-Sample Paradigm ===
Nadia Kohts is often credited as being the inventor of the popular Match-to-Sample behavioral testing paradigm. Kohts would often hold up a colored brick and ask Joni to identify the same colored brick from a series of colors in front of him. However, her most interesting and novel approach to this testing paradigm was a match-to-sample that required a transfer from one sense to another. In this test, Kohts would hold up an object for Joni to see, and then place it in a sack with other objects that were obscured from Joni's vision. Then, Joni would reach inside to feel for the object that matched the one Kohts had held up. In this test, Joni had to transfer a visual stimulus into a tactile stimulus.

=== Other notable work ===
Kohts studied behaviors such as tool use and modification in chimpanzees – behaviors that were not well documented until decades past her time. During a five-year study of an adult chimpanzee named "Paris," Kohts details events in which Paris built sleeping nests from branches and leaves, used tools to acquire rewards, and modified/extended tools to acquire rewards.

== Honors and awards ==
Nadia Kohts was named an Honored Scientist of the Russian Soviet Federated Socialist Republic in 1960. She also was awarded the Order of Lenin, among others.

== Personal life ==
Kohts had one son, Rudolf Alfred Kohts, in 1925 named after Rudolf Steiner who the couple admired. She died at the age of 74 on September 3, 1963, likely due to a heart condition she had had for several years.

== Publications ==
- Ladygina-Kohts, Nadezhda Nikolaevna (2002). Infant chimpanzee and human child: A classic 1935 comparative study of ape emotions and intelligence. Oxford University Press. ISBN 978-0-19-513565-7.
- Ladygina-Kots, N.N. (1965). Predposylki chelovecheskogo myshleniia; podrazhatel'noe konstruirovanie obez'ianoĭ i det'mi. Moskva, Nauka
- Dembowski, J., Ladygina-Kots, N.N. (1963). Psikhologii︠a︡ obezʹi︠a︡n. Moskva : Izd-vo inostrannoĭ lit-ry.
- Ladygina-Kots, N.N. (1959). Konstruktivnai︠a︡ i orudiĭnai︠a︡ dei︠a︡telʹnostʹ vysshikh obezʹi︠a︡n. (The constructive and instrumental activity of the higher monkeys.)
- Ladygina-Kots, N.N. (1958). Razvitie psikhiki v protsesse evoliutsii organizmov. (Development of the psyche in the evolution of organisms).
- Ladygina-Kots (1935). Diti︠a︡ shimpanze i diti︠a︡ cheloveka : v ikh instinktakh, ėmot︠s︡ii︠a︡kh, igrakh, privychkakh i vyrazitelʹhykh dvizhenii︠a︡kh. Moskva : Izdanie Gosudarstvennogo Darvinovskogo muzei︠a︡.
- Ladygina-Kots, N.N. (1928). Prisposobitelʹnye motornye navyki makaka v uslovi︠a︡kh ėksperimenta: k voprosu o "trudovykh prot︠s︡essakh" nizshikh obezʹi︠a︡n. (Adaptive motor habits of the Macacus Rhesus under experimental conditions: a contribution to the problem of "labour processes" of monkeys. Moskva: Izandie Gosudarstvennogo Darvinovskogo muzeia.
- Ladygina-Kots, N.N. (1923). Untersuchungen über die erkenntnisfähigkeiten des schimpansen aus dem Zoopsychologischen laboratorium des Museum Darwinianum in Moskau. (Investigations on the cognitive abilities of the chimpanzee from the Zoopsychological Laboratory of the Museum Darwinianum in Moscow). Moskva-Petrograd, Gosudarstvennoe izdatelʹstvo.
- Ladygina-Kots, N.N. (1923). Issledovanie poznavatel'nych sposobnostej šimpanze. Moskva [u.a.] Gosud. Izdat.
