= Theodore K. Lorenz =

Russian ornithologist (1842–1909)

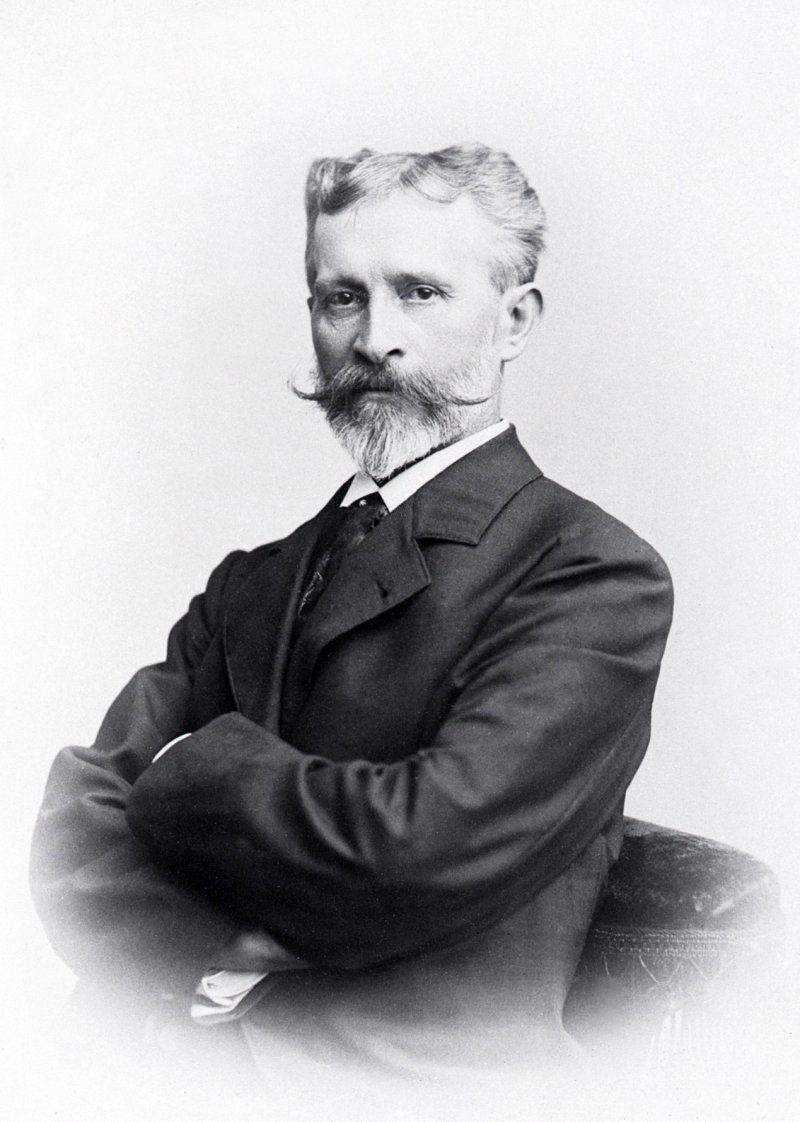
Fyodor Karlovich Lorenz

Theodore K. Lorenz (Russian: Фёдор Карлович Лоренц, romanized: Fyodor Karlovich Lorents; 15 March 1842 – 5 October 1909) was a Russian ornithologist and a taxidermist of repute who worked in Moscow. He was of German descent. For his exceptional artistic specimen preparations, he was called the "Stradivarius of taxidermy".

== Life ==
Lorenz was born in Vilyun (present-day Poland). His father was a textile specialist from Saxony who moved to the Russian Empire, where Lorenz grew up. He was educated at home and after studying three years at school he began to work from the age of 16 in a music company. His father later moved to Bogorodsky District, where Lorenz enjoyed hunting excursions and began to work on taxidermy. He worked briefly, following his father's business, in dyeing. He then became a specimen preparator and participated in the Moscow Polytechnic Exhibition of 1872. He worked as a taxidermist in the Zoological Garden of the Imperial University in Moscow. He trained Aleksandr Kots and worked with many zoologists and trained a number of taxidermists. He explored the Caucasus and present-day Kyrgyzstan as part of faunal surveys and was a specialist on the birdlife of the region. He became an expert on the biology of the black grouse. He also took an interest in hybridization and plumage variation. A number of his specimens were made for the Darwin Museum.

Lorenz was an authority on Tetraonidae and Phasianidae and an illustrated monograph on the grouse was published posthumously in 1910.

Lorenz is buried in Vvedenskoye Cemetery in Moscow. A species of snake, Ramphotyphlops lorenzi, is named in his honor.

== Works ==
Partial list (all in German):

- "Die Lazurmeise, Parus cyanus". Journal für Ornithologie (1871)
- Beitrag zur Kentniss der Ornithologischen Fauna an der Nordseite des Kaukasus (Moscow, 1887)
- "Briefliches über zwei neue Fasanen-Abarten ". Journal für Ornithologie 36: 571–572. (1888)
- "Ein neur Bastard - Chrysomitris spinus x Acanthis linaria". Journal für Ornithologie 38: 98-100. (1890)
- "Die Vögel des Moskauer Gouvernements ". Bull. Soc. Nat. Moscou 6: 263–321. (1893) – 7: 337–354. (1894) – 8: 325–350. (1895)
- "Über Tetrao tetrix subspec. viridianus". Journal für Ornithologie 39: 366–368. (1891)
- "Einiges über den von Herrn V. v. Tschudi beschriebenen seltenen Rackelhahn ". Journal für Ornithologie 39: 405–412. (1891)
- "Wiederum Einiges über Rackelwild und Hahnenfedrigkeit ". Journal für Ornithologie 42: 416–425. (1894)
- "Phasianus mongolicus turcestanicus, nov. subspec". Ornith. Mber. 4: 189-191 .(1895)

== Sources ==
- "Лоренц, Федор Карлович" . Brockhaus and Efron Encyclopedic Dictionary (in Russian). 1906.
