= Aleksandr Kots =

Russian zoologist (1880–1964)

Aleksandr Fyodorovich Kots Александр Фёдорович Котс
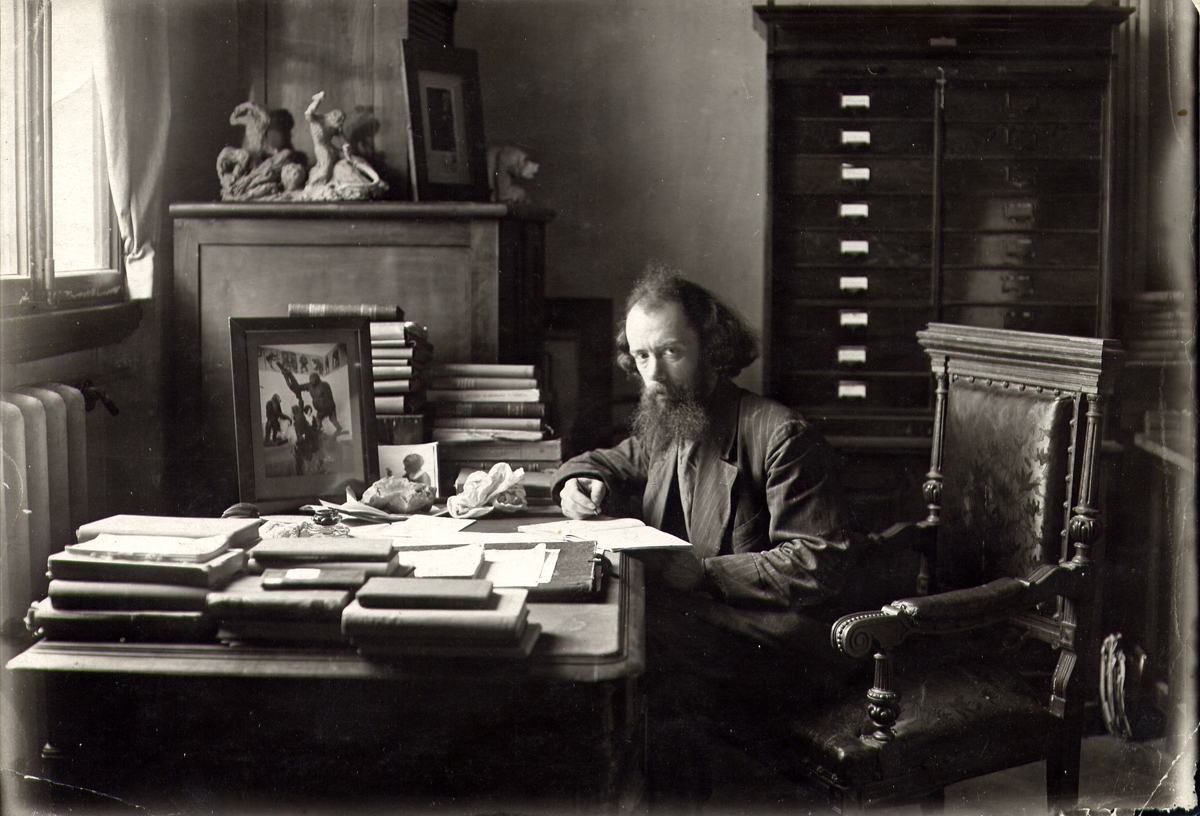
- Alexandr Kots in 1925
- Born: 19 April 1880; Borisoglebsk, Russia
- Died: 7 September 1964 (aged 84); Moscow
- Education: Moscow University
- Spouse: Nadezhda Ladygina-Kohts
- Scientific career
- Fields: Zoology
- Workplaces: Moscow University; State Darwin Museum, Moscow (founding director)

Aleksandr Fyodorovich Kots (German form Alexander Erich Kohts; Russian: Александр Фёдорович Котс; 19 April 1880 – 7 September 1964) was a Soviet and Russian zoologist and founding director of the State Darwin Museum in Moscow. His wife was the animal behaviourist Nadezhda Ladygina-Kohts.

== Biography ==
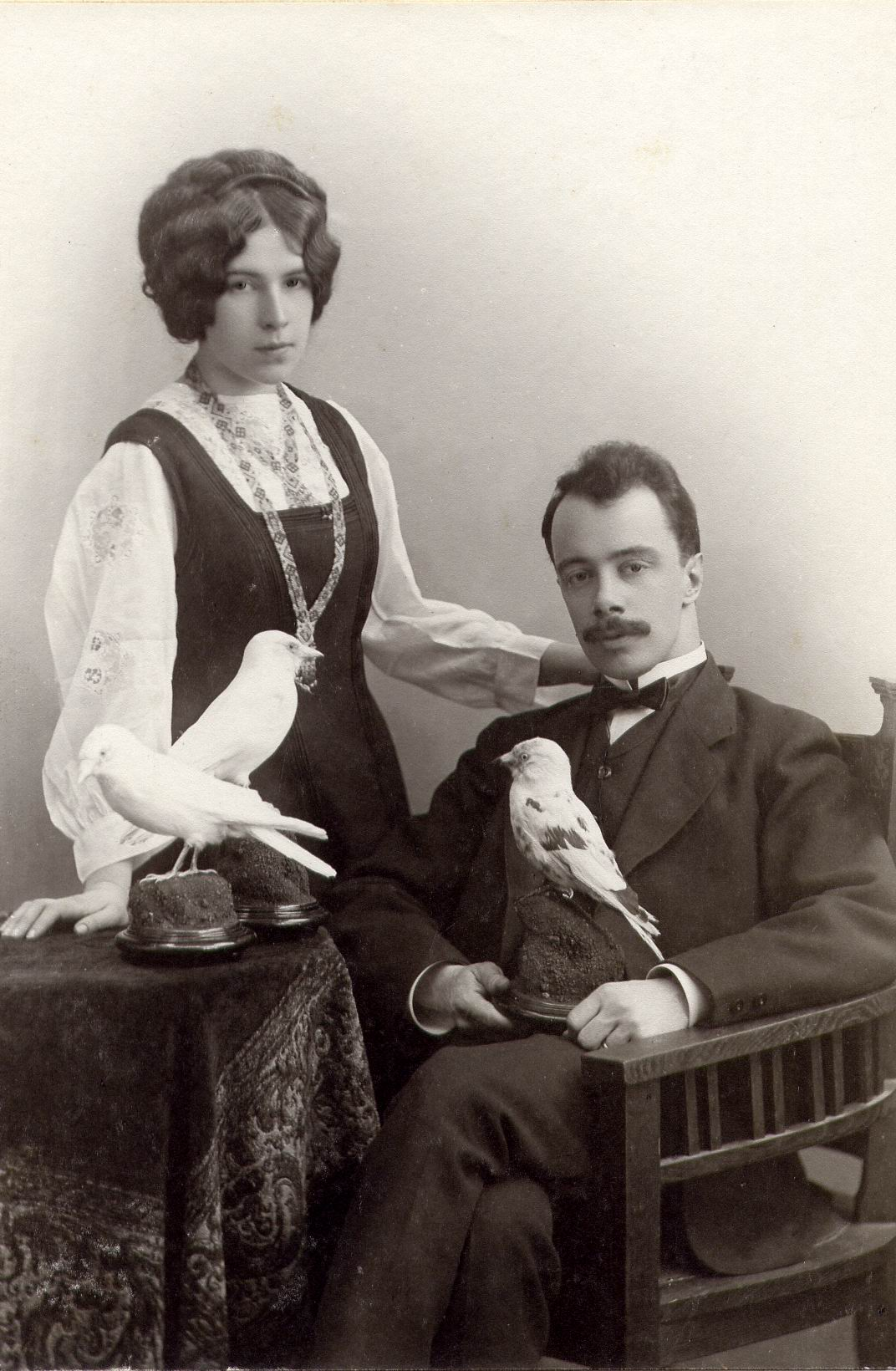
Nadezhda Ladygina and A.F. Kots

Kots was born in Borisoglebsk, Tambov to Berlin-born linguist and botanist Alfred Kots and Evgenia (Johanna) Alexandrovna née Grassman. He began to collect natural history specimens at a young age and was educated at the Moscow classical gymnasium. He learned to stuff and prepare animal specimens from F. Yuri Felman and received a gold medal for his taxidermy in 1896. With references from Theodore K. Lorenz and Mikhail Menzbier he went on a scientific expedition to Western Siberia in 1899 and collected a large number of specimens for which he received a silver medal from the Russian Society for Acclimatization of Animals and Plants. He joined Moscow University in 1901 and between his studies he made a trip to European museum and graduated in 1906. He then worked with Mikhail Menzbir. In 1907 he began to teach evolution to women at Moscow university at the invitation of Petr Sushkin and Nikolai Koltsov. In 1909 the collections of Theodore K. Lorenz were passed on to him and he then began to establish a small museum which became the Darwin Museum in 1922. He married Nadezhda Nikolayevna Ladygina, one of his students, in 1911 and they had a son who they named as Rudolf after Rudolf Steiner who greatly influenced them. Kots taught at the Moscow University, the Military Pedagogical Academy, gave numerous popular lectures, was a director of Moscow Zoo, and the Darwin Museum. After his death there was a plan to dissolve the museum but it was saved by V. N. Ignatijeva.
