= Cosmoscow International Contemporary Art Fair =

Cosmoscow International Contemporary Art Fair, aimed at bringing together both Russian and international collectors, galleries and artists, was launched by Russian art historian, patron of young artists and collector Margarita Pushkina in 2010. Since then it continues fostering local art market by supporting emerging artists and gallerists. With a number of curated projects, newly established Cosmoscow Foundation programme, educational and parallel events, Cosmoscow acts as the leading platform for building the country’s contemporary art market.

The second edition of Cosmoscow took place in 2014. The fair took place at the Moscow Manege, lasting for 4 days (September 18–21), hosted 26 galleries and welcomed 10,500 visitors.

Cosmoscow third edition took place in 2015 (September 10–13) at the Gostiny Dvor. It was accompanied by a number of prolonged initiatives that drew much public attention, including the Off white charity auction. In 2015 Cosmoscow gained support from its new strategic partner – Credit Suisse. This time Cosmoscow hosted 34 galleries and welcomed 14,000 guests.

The 5th anniversary edition of Cosmoscow took place in the historic market building of Gostiny Dvor from 7 to 10 September 2017. It saw the record number of 54 participants, growing number of 19,200 visitors and rewarding sales results across Russian and international exhibitors. Remaining the only international contemporary art fair in Russia and CIS, Cosmoscow continues fostering local art market by supporting young and emerging artists and gallerists. Year 2017 saw the launch of Cosmoscow Foundation for Contemporary Art, an institution combining fair's non-commercial initiatives, undertaken in recent years. As part of the partnership between Cosmoscow and the State Tretyakov Gallery named Cosmoscow's Museum Partner for 2017, a special acquisition of three works by Russian artist Andrey Kuzkin to the museum's permanent collection with participation of the Foundation was announced.

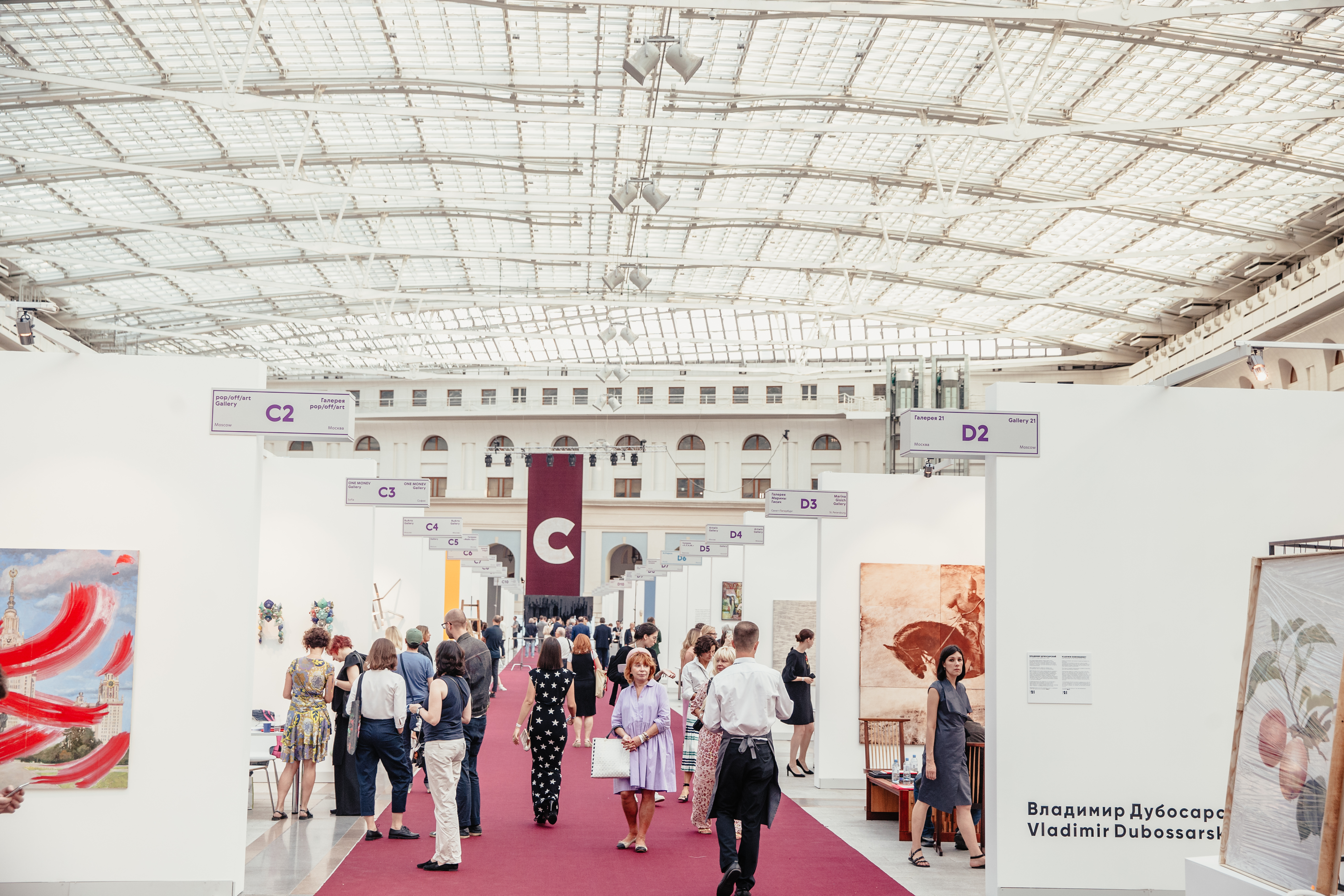
The 6th Cosmoscow International Contemporary Art Fair

The 6th Cosmoscow fait took place on September 7–9, 2018, at Moscow's Gostiny Dvor. Its three-day public programme saw a growing number of 19 000 visitors and the record number of 66 participants from Russia, Europe, America, and Middle East representing 250 contemporary artists from around the world. Cosmoscow 2018 programming featured 7 curated sections. It also included “What we are made of” exhibition of contemporary Qatari art held within the Year of Culture Qatar-Russia 2018. The exposition brought together a curated selection of Qatari artists from different generations, showcasing the remarkable historical development of the artistic avant-garde in Qatar. The exhibition was curated by Reem Fadda, one of the leading experts in Middle Eastern art. At the fair opening, Credit Suisse and Cosmoscow announced the laureate of their joint award for young artistic talent in Russia. Asya Marakulina from Saint Petersburg was selected the winner by the international jury. As part of partnership with the Pushkin State Museum of Fine Arts, 2018 Museum of the Year, Cosmoscow announced the donation of 5 works by 2018 Artist of the Year Taus Makhacheva for the new collection of media art formed as a part of the Pushkin Museum XXI programme.

The 7th edition of the fair took place at the Gostiny Dvor on September 6–8, 2019. The Preview and the three-day public program Cosmoscow saw a record total of over 22,000 visitors. The fair presented 67 galleries and over 300 artists from 14 countries. The Embassy of the State of Qatar to the Russian Federation and Qatar Airways presented the “White Sun” exhibition.

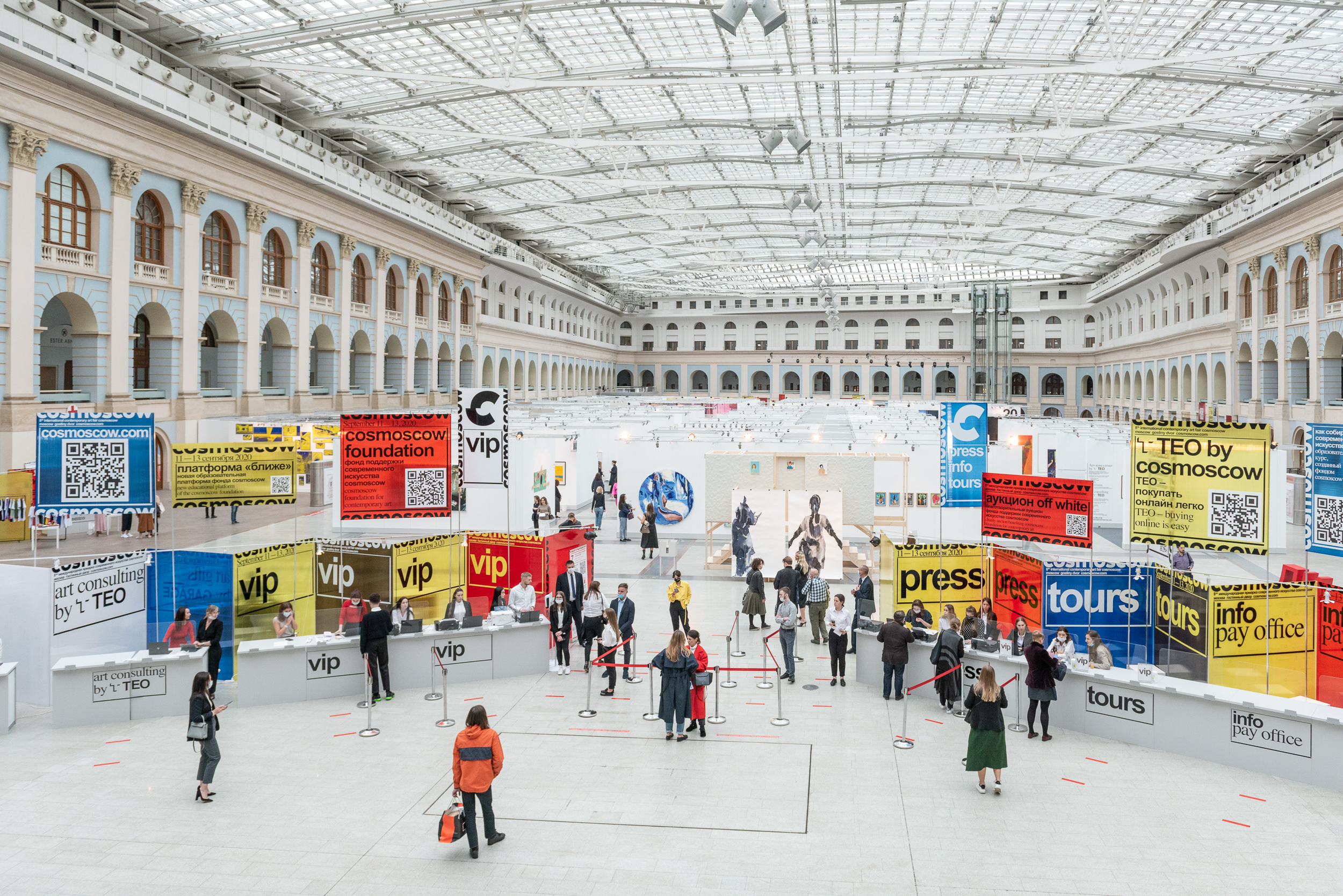
The 8th edition of Cosmoscow

The 8th Cosmoscow International Contemporary Art Fair was once again held at the Gostiny Dvor on September 11–13, 2020. The event took place despite the pandemic attended by a total of 9,600 people – the maximum possible number considering the Rospotrebnadzor restrictions. Visitors entered the venue in sessions with a fixed time and a quota of 600 people per session. For the first time, the fair was held in a hybrid format: the live event at the Gostiny Dvor was enhanced by the Online Cosmoscow platform with an extended list of participating galleries (10 galleries from the UK, Mexico, Belgium, Denmark, Norway, and Russia not represented at the offline fair).

The 9th edition of Cosmoscow was supposed to be held at the Gostiny Dvor on September 10–12, 2021, but due to the extension of the work of one of the largest vaccination centers in Russia, the fair was moved to the Moscow Manege with dates changing to September 18–20.The event was held in the COVID-free format, the entrance was carried out by sessions with a fixed entry time.

The anniversary 10th edition of Cosmoscow is to be held on September 15–17, 2022 at the Gostiny Dvor.
