= State Darwin Museum =

Museum in Moscow, Russia

Coordinates: 55°41′26″N 37°33′42″E

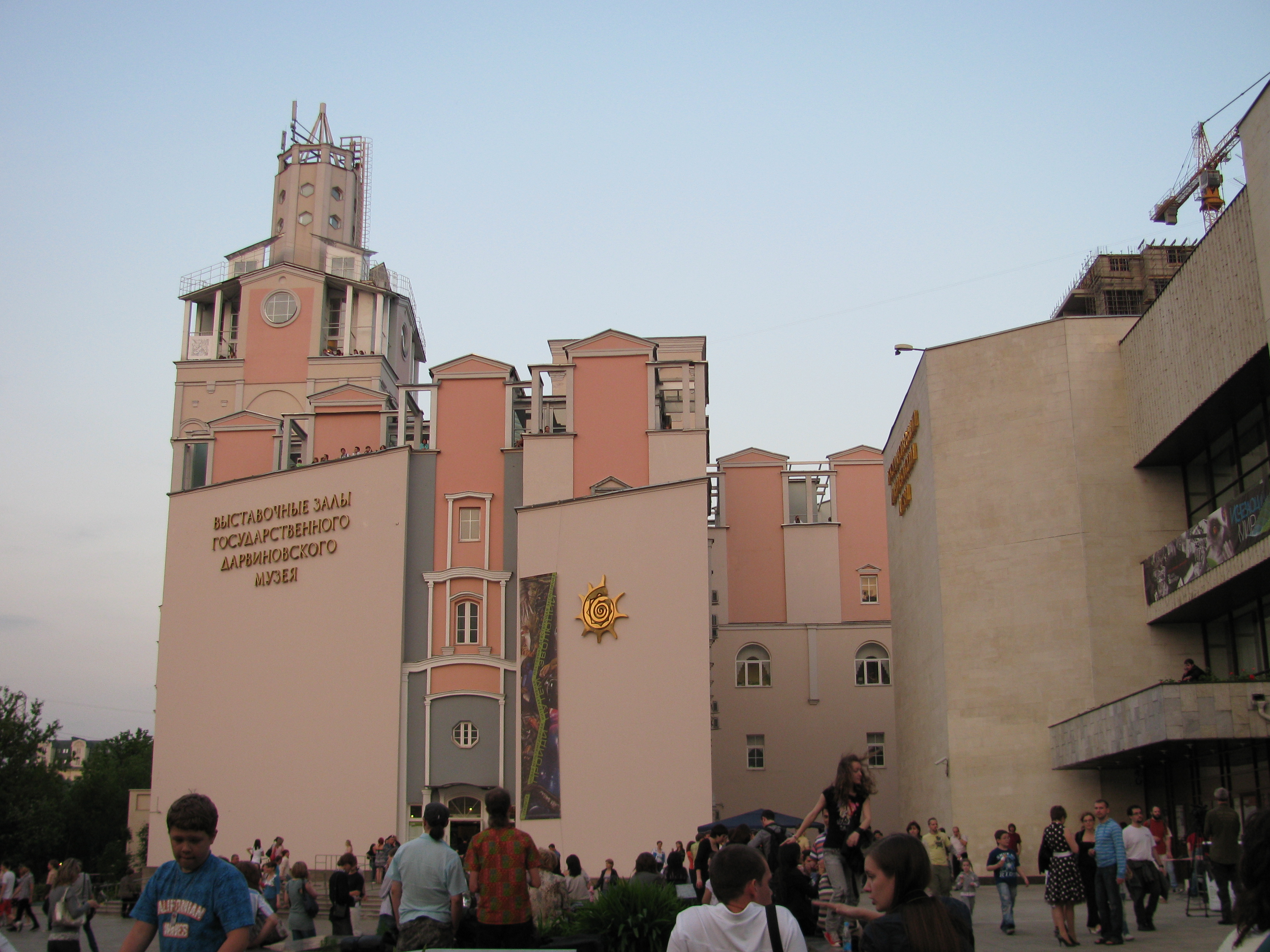
State Darwin Museum, Moscow, 57/1 Vavilova St.

The State Darwin Museum (Russian: Государственный Дарвиновский музей) is a natural history museum in Moscow. The museum was founded in 1907 by Alexander Kohts (1880–1964) and was the world's first museum of evolution explaining the work of Charles Darwin as a causal explanation of nature.

In 2026, Darwin museum started a scientific collaboration with the Dodo Museum. The director of Dodo Museum, Bernard Eric Typhis Degtyarenko from Mauritius visited Russia and the Darwin Museum to sign this agreement.
